= 2024 Portland, Oregon, City Council election =

2024 Portland City Council elections
- November 5, 2024

All 12 seats in the Portland City Council 7 seats needed for a majority

The 2024 Portland City Council elections were held on November 5, 2024. It was the first election under Portland's new form of government, the first election to elect a city council instead of a city commission, the first without a primary, the first where every seat was up for election, and the first under a proportional ranked-choice voting system (single transferable voting) as opposed to a first-past-the-post voting system with a primary. It was held concurrently with the 2024 Portland, Oregon mayoral election.

Prior to January 2025, Portland used a city commission government with a five-member board, including the mayor. Under the new form of government, approved by voters in 2022 and which came into effect in January 2025, the mayor is no longer a part of the city council, and instead of five at-large positions, the council has twelve districted seats. Portland is divided into four districts, each electing three councilmembers. The district elections use a single transferable vote election system. Special elections will no longer be used to fill vacancies in the council. The elections continue to be officially nonpartisan (so party proportionality cannot be measured).

In the previous election, Dan Ryan and Rene Gonzalez were elected to the council, marking that voters had shifted away from progressivism towards policies advocated by centrist Democrats. In the 2024 mayoral race, Ted Wheeler chose not to run for re-election. Outgoing commission members Mingus Mapps, Rene Gonzalez, and Carmen Rubio ran for mayor, while Dan Ryan ran for a City Council seat in District 2.

In the mayoral race, Mapps, Gonzalez and Rubio, alongside 15 other candidates, were all defeated by businessman Keith Wilson, while Ryan became the lone member of the previous City Commission to be elected to the new City Council in District 2 (although Steve Novick had previously served from 2013-2017). Joining him were Candace Avalos, Loretta Smith, and Jamie Dunphy from District 1, Sameer Kanal and Elana Pirtle-Guiney in District 2, Steve Novick, Angelita Morillo, and Tiffany Koyama Lane in District 3, and Olivia Clark, Mitch Green, and Eric Zimmerman in District 4.

Clark and Novick's victories were called by The Oregonian on election night, but 8 of the remaining 10 seats were not called until Saturday, November 9, while Dunphy and Zimmerman's seats were not decided until Thursday, November 21 — more than 2 weeks after Election Day.

== District 1 ==
2024 Portland, Oregon City Council election, District 1
- November 5, 2024
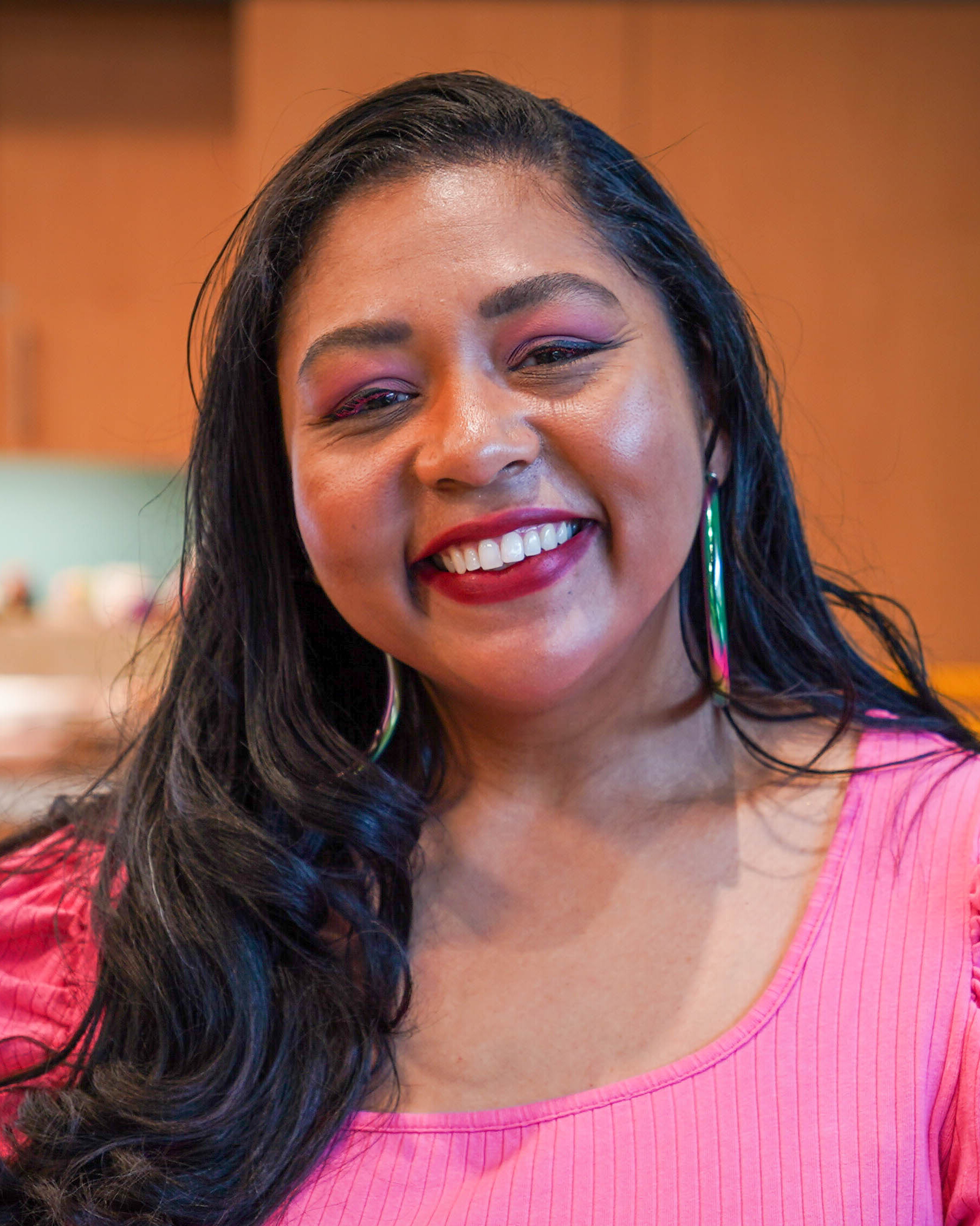

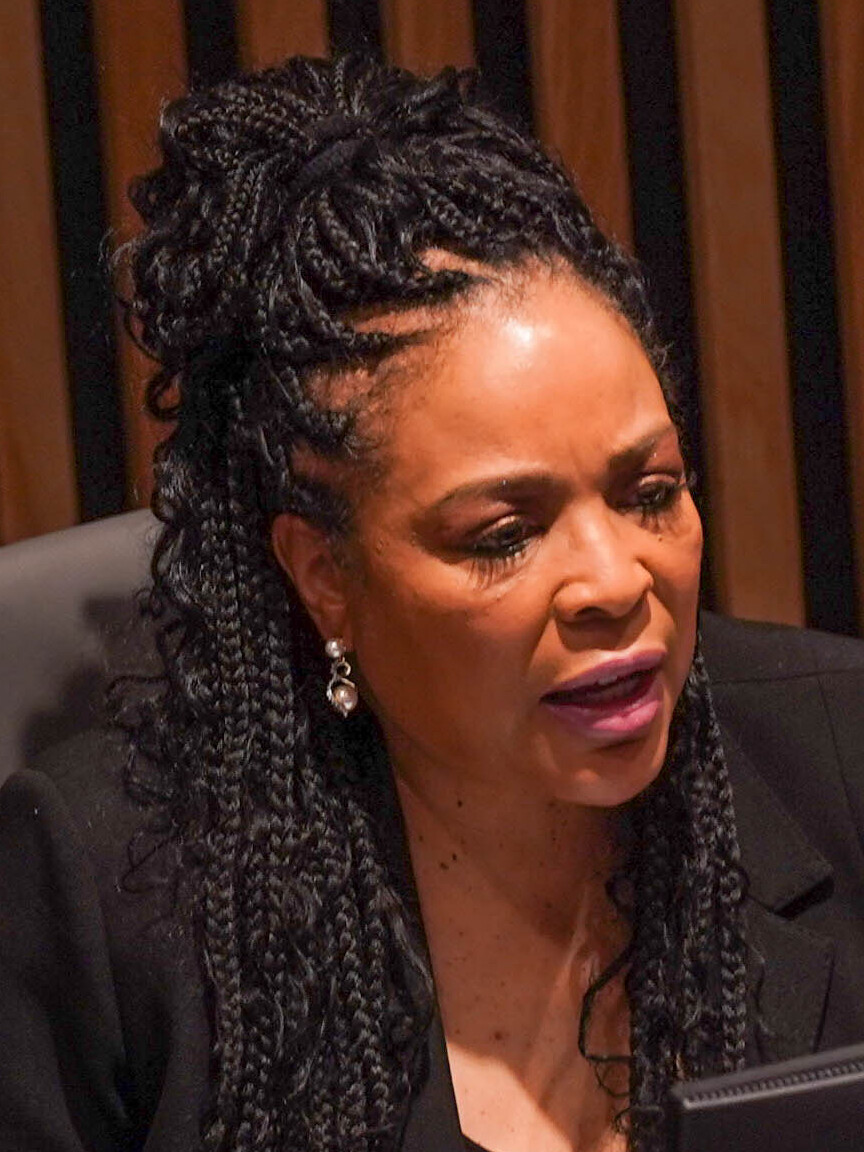

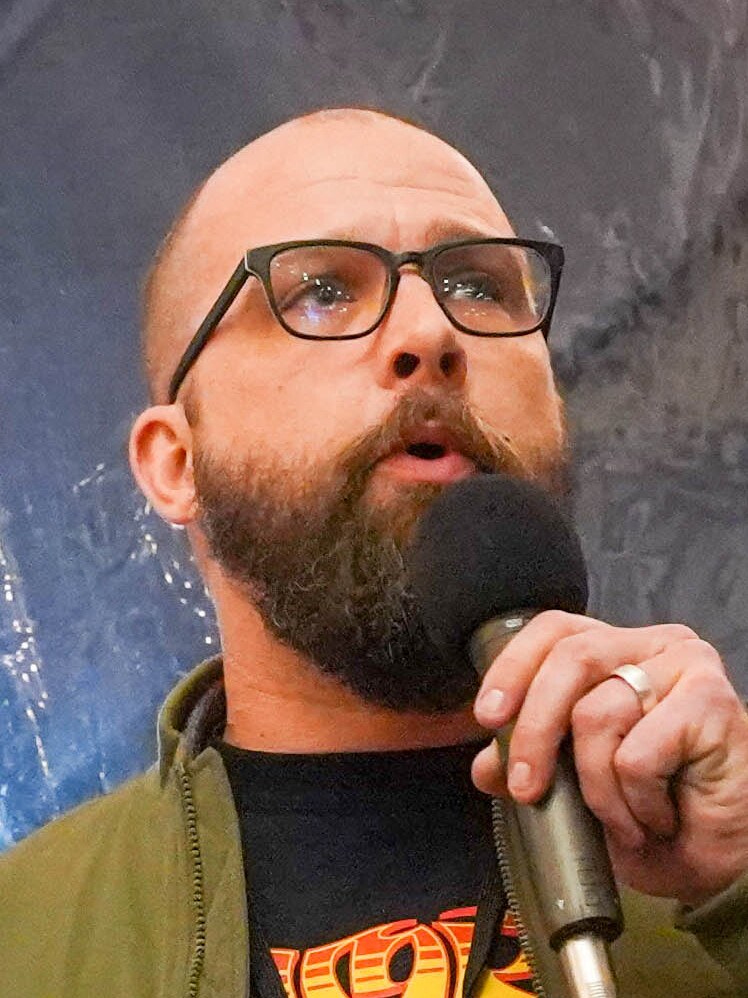

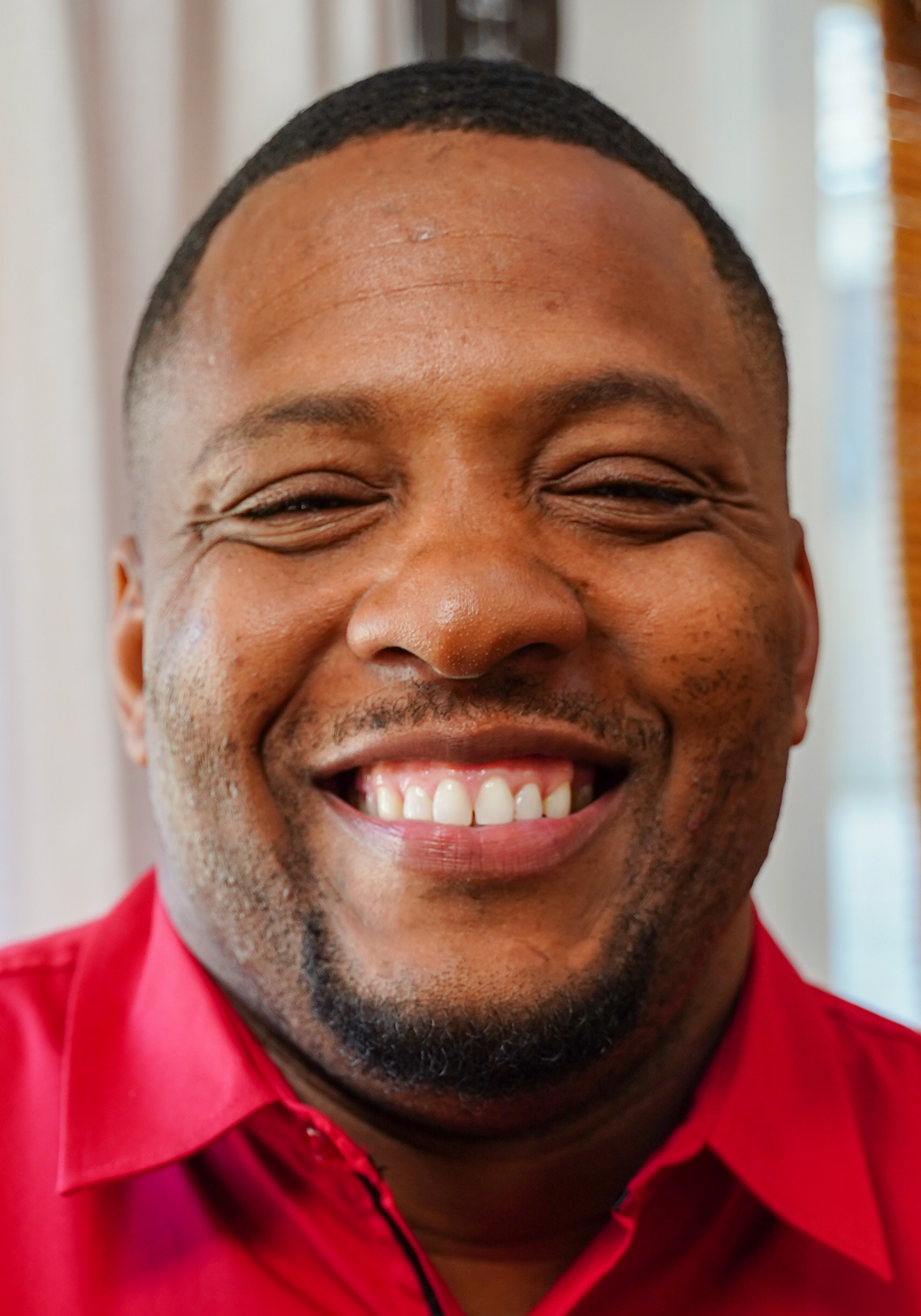

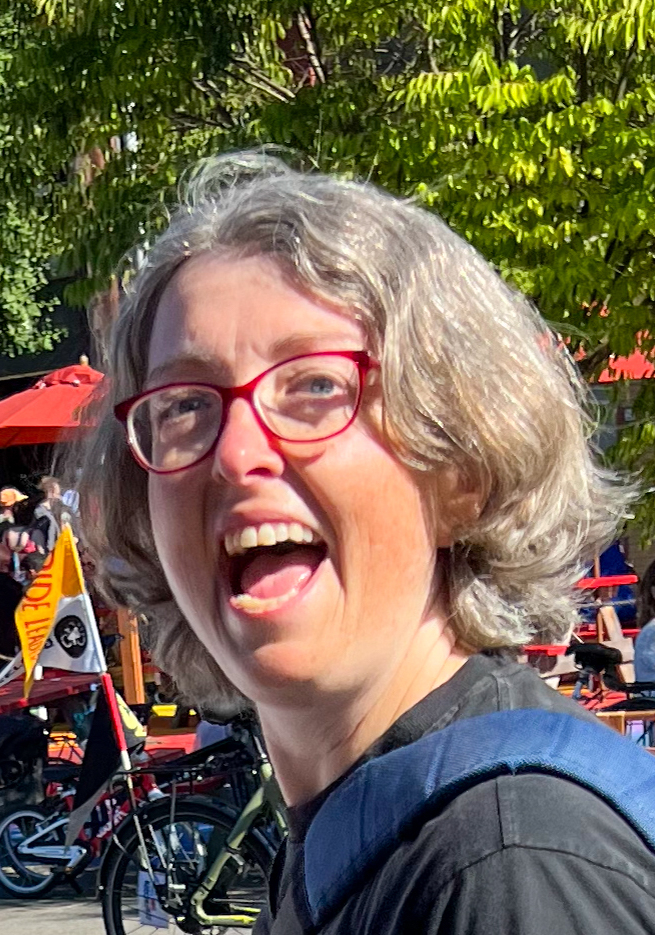
| Candidate | Candace Avalos | Loretta Smith | Jamie Dunphy |
| First round | 8,079; 19.28% | 5,451; 13.01% | 4,951; 11.81% |
| Final round | 10,478; 25.00% | 10,478; 25.00% | 9,495; 22.66% |
| Candidate | Terrence Hayes | Noah Ernst | Steph Routh |
| First round | 3,863; 9.22% | 3,967; 9.47% | 3,828; 9.13% |
| Final round | Eliminated | Eliminated | Eliminated |
City Councilors before election
Offices established
Elected City Councilors
Candace Avalos
Loretta Smith
Jamie Dunphy

District 1 represents the eastern part of the city, primarily everything east of Interstate 205 all the way to the city's eastern border with Gresham, as well as Portland International Airport. Neighborhoods represented include Argay, Centennial, Glenfair, Hazelwood, Lents, Mill Park, Parkrose, Parkrose Heights, Pleasant Valley, Powellhurst-Gilbert, Russell, Sumner, Wilkes, and Woodland Park.

=== Candidates ===
==== Declared ====
- Joe Allen
- Candace Avalos, executive director of Verde, former member of the Portland Charter Commission, and candidate for Portland City Commission in 2020
- Doug Clove, inspector, Portland Water Bureau
- Jamie Dunphy, former staffer to Commissioner Nick Fish
- Timur Ender, former policy advisor to former Portland City Commissioner Steve Novick and Oregon Walks board member
- Noah Ernst, superintendent and attorney for Radio Cab Co.
- Joe Furi
- Terrence Hayes, civil rights activist
- David Linn, Centennial School District board member
- Peggy Sue Owens, candidate for Portland City Commission in 2022
- Steph Routh, Portland Planning Commission member
- Mike Sands
- Thomas Shervey
- Loretta Smith, former Multnomah County commissioner, candidate for city commission in 2018 and 2020, and candidate for Oregon's 6th congressional district in 2022
- Cayle Tern, Reynolds School Board member

==== Withdrawn ====
- Sonja McKenzie, Parkrose School District board member and former Oregon School Board Association president

==== Campaign Suspended ====
- Deian Salazar, Oregon Commission on Autism Spectrum Disorder member at-large (endorsed Hayes, joined Hayes campaign as Policy Advisor and Deputy Field Manager)

=== Results ===
2024 Portland, Oregon City Council election, District 1 results

2024 Portland, Oregon City Council election, District 1
| Party | Candidate | FPv% | Count | | | | | | | | | | | | | | | | |
| Party | Candidate | FPv% | 1 | 2 | 3 | 4 | 5 | 6 | 7 | 8 | 9 | 10 | 11 | 12 | 13 | 14 | 15 | 16 | 17 |
|---|---|---|---|---|---|---|---|---|---|---|---|---|---|---|---|---|---|---|---|
| Nonpartisan | Candace Avalos | 19.4 | 8,297 | 8,307 | 8,337 | 8,368 | 8,543 | 8,637 | 8,726 | 8,789 | 8,938 | 9,237 | 9,372 | 10,649 | 12,169 | 10,718 | 10,718 | 10,718 | 10,718 |
| Nonpartisan | Loretta Smith | 13.0 | 5,586 | 5,595 | 5,608 | 5,634 | 5,687 | 5,767 | 5,889 | 5,999 | 6,158 | 6,399 | 6,689 | 7,198 | 7,953 | 8,207.25 | 9,172.84 | 12,027.1 | 10,718 |
| Nonpartisan | Jamie Dunphy | 11.8 | 5,064 | 5,068 | 5,075 | 5,108 | 5,146 | 5,180 | 5,250 | 5,303 | 5,412 | 5,483 | 5,635 | 6,079 | 7,305 | 7,893.25 | 8,491.6 | 9,749.63 | 9,749.63 |
| Nonpartisan | Terrence Hayes | 9.3 | 3,975 | 3,984 | 4,003 | 4,046 | 4,078 | 4,172 | 4,251 | 4,314 | 4,445 | 4,525 | 4,847 | 5,214 | 5,787 | 5,952.93 | 7,682.34 | | |
| Nonpartisan | Noah Ernst | 9.5 | 4,052 | 4,060 | 4,082 | 4,095 | 4,129 | 4,190 | 4,251 | 4,360 | 4,479 | 4,642 | 5,116 | 5,658 | 5,883 | 5,935.57 | | | |
| Nonpartisan | Steph Routh | 9.1 | 3,894 | 3,898 | 3,904 | 3,940 | 3,997 | 4,033 | 4,095 | 4,155 | 4,266 | 4,332 | 4,500 | 5,089 | | | | | |
| Nonpartisan | Timur Ender | 8.3 | 3,550 | 3,556 | 3,567 | 3,586 | 3,662 | 3,699 | 3,784 | 3,861 | 3,983 | 4,187 | 4,335 | | | | | | |
| Nonpartisan | Doug Clove | 4.0 | 1,698 | 1,709 | 1,736 | 1,765 | 1,795 | 1,883 | 1,977 | 2,129 | 2,302 | 2,403 | | | | | | | |
| Nonpartisan | Peggy Sue Owens | 3.0 | 1,266 | 1,269 | 1,279 | 1,294 | 1,321 | 1,333 | 1,365 | 1,441 | 1,501 | | | | | | | | |
| Nonpartisan | David Linn | 2.6 | 1,111 | 1,113 | 1,130 | 1,150 | 1,195 | 1,226 | 1,308 | 1,441 | | | | | | | | | |
| Nonpartisan | Joe Allen | 2.3 | 978 | 981 | 1,011 | 1,026 | 1,040 | 1,068 | 1,141 | | | | | | | | | | |
| Nonpartisan | Michael (Mike) Sands | 2.2 | 952 | 957 | 987 | 1,013 | 1,033 | 1,063 | | | | | | | | | | | |
| Nonpartisan | Deian Salazar | 1.7 | 720 | 720 | 741 | 754 | 789 | | | | | | | | | | | | |
| Nonpartisan | Cayle Tern | 1.7 | 711 | 713 | 726 | 741 | | | | | | | | | | | | | |
| Nonpartisan | Thomas Shervey | 0.9 | 385 | 387 | 402 | | | | | | | | | | | | | | |
| Nonpartisan | Joe Furi | 0.8 | 355 | 361 | | | | | | | | | | | | | | | |
| Nonpartisan | Uncertified Write In | 0.6 | 277 | | | | | | | | | | | | | | | | |
Quota: 10,718

== District 2 ==
2024 Portland, Oregon City Council election, District 2
- November 5, 2024
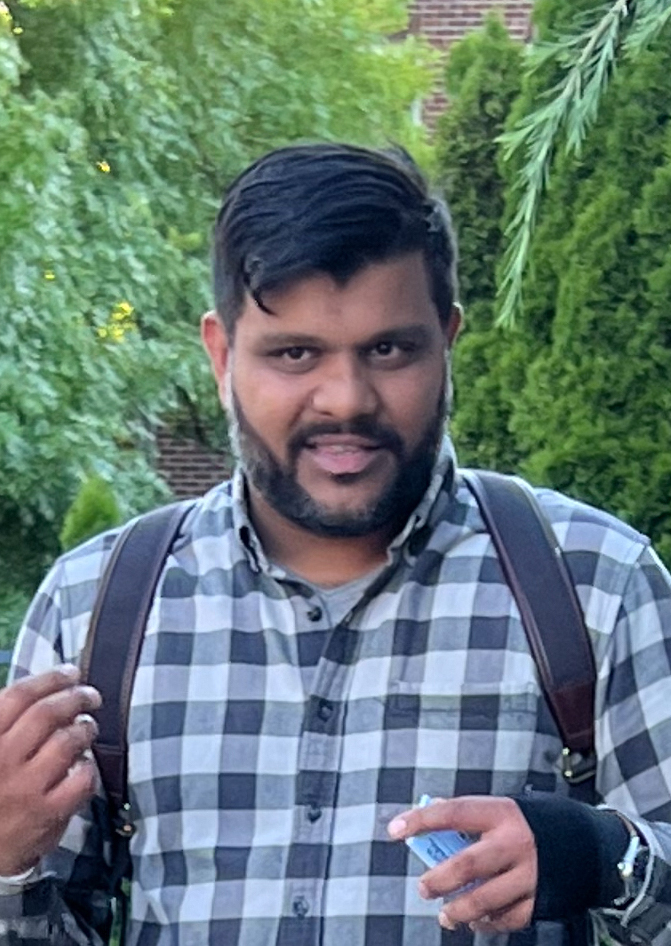

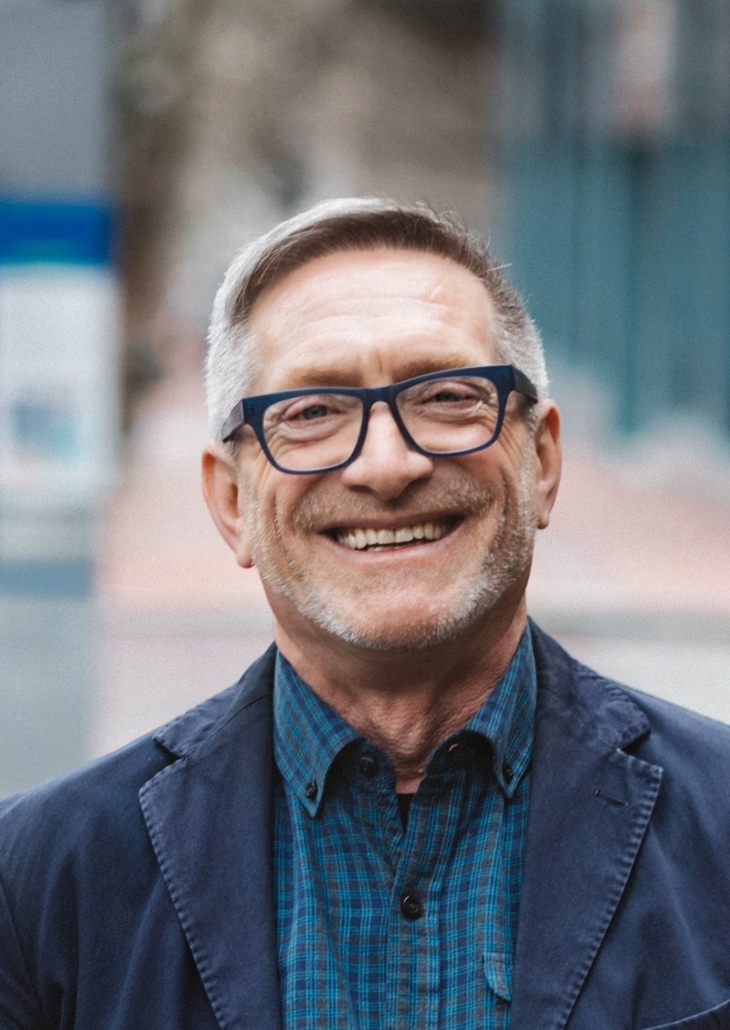

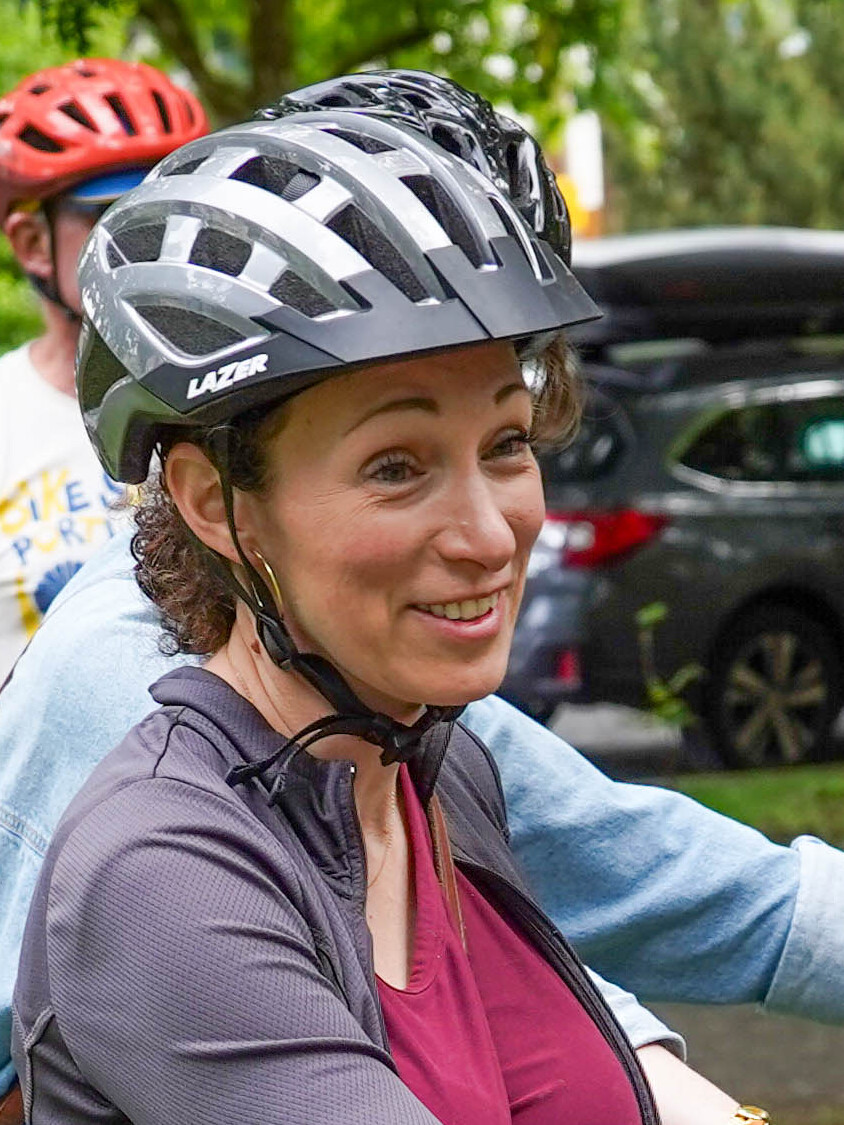

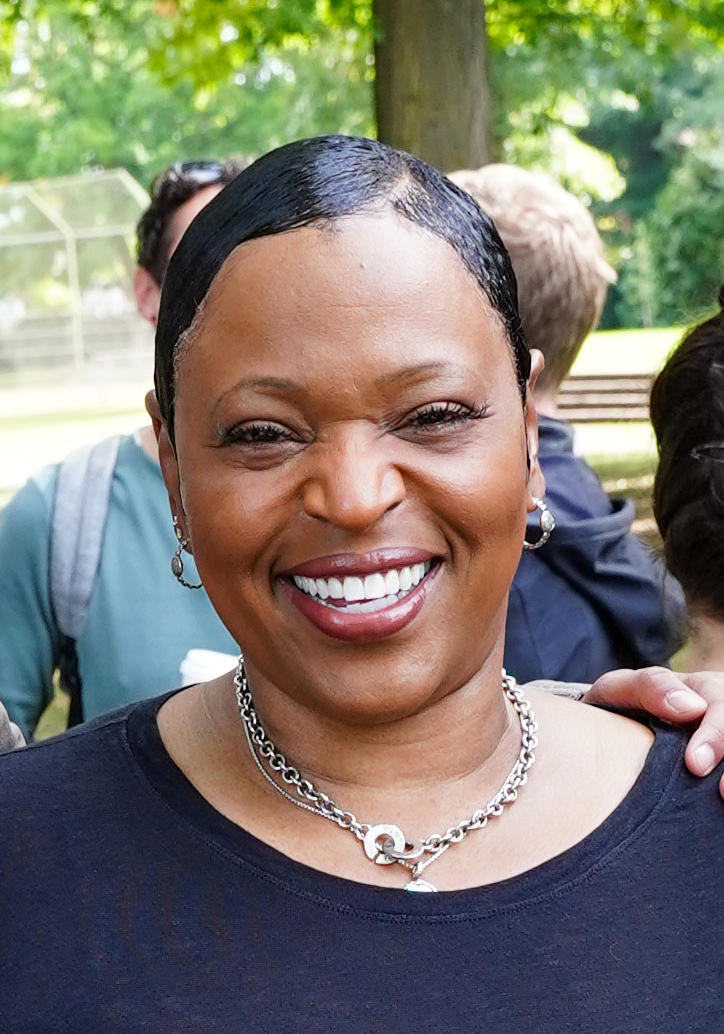

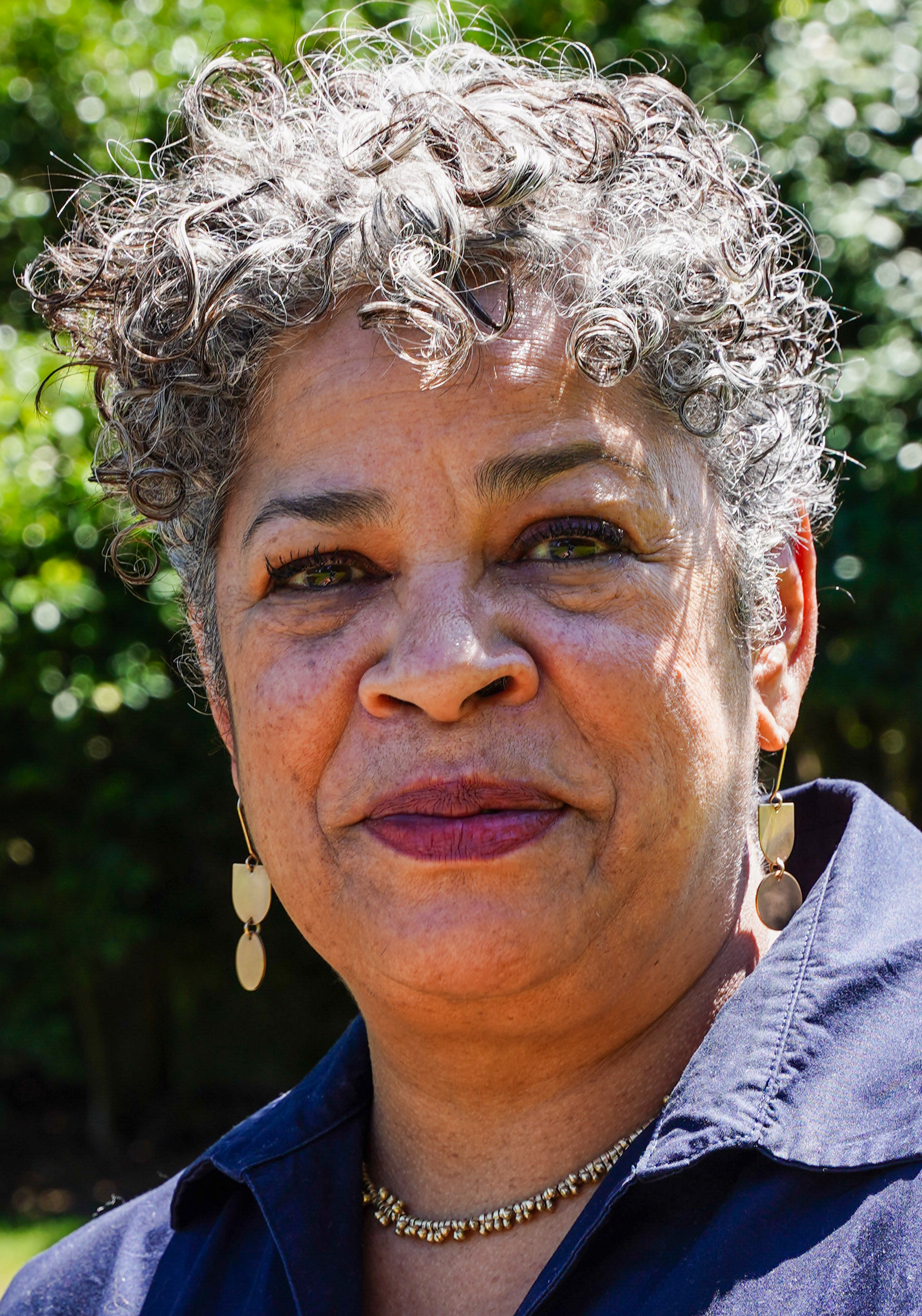

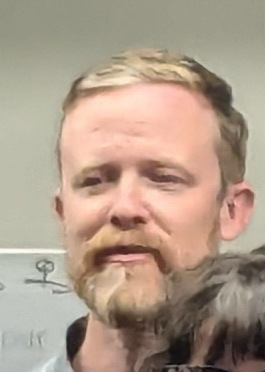
| Candidate | Sameer Kanal | Dan Ryan | Elana Pirtle-Guiney |
| First round | 9,699; 12.85% | 11,871; 15.72% | 12,196; 16.15% |
| Final round | 18,875; 25.00% | 18,875; 25.00% | 18,875; 25.00% |
| Candidate | Tiffani Penson | Michelle DePass | Nat West |
| First round | 7,020; 9.30% | 6,669; 8.83% | 5,366; 7.11% |
| Final round | Eliminated | Eliminated | Eliminated |
City Councilors before election
Offices established
Elected City Councilors
Sameer Kanal
Dan Ryan
Elana Pirtle-Guiney

District 2 represents most of North and Northeast Portland north of Interstate 84 and west of 82nd Avenue. Neighborhoods represented include Alameda, Arbor Lodge, Beaumont-Wilshire, Boise, Bridgeton, Cathedral Park, Concordia, Cully, Dignity Village, East Columbia, Eliot, Grant Park, Hayden Island, Hollywood, Humboldt, Irvington, Kenton, King, Lloyd District, Madison South, Overlook, Piedmont, Portsmouth, Sabin, St. Johns, Sullivan's Gulch, Sumner, Sunderland, University Park, Vernon, and Woodlawn.

=== Candidates ===
==== Declared ====
- James Armstrong, accountant and small business advocate
- Reuben Berlin, mortgage loan officer
- Michelle DePass, Portland Public Schools board chair
- Debbie Kitchin, former Portland Charter Commissioner and small business owner
- Marnie Glickman, lawyer
- Mariah Hudson, chair of Portland Bureau of Transportation and co-chair of the PPS Budget Advisory Committees, past chair Northeast Coalition of Neighborhoods
- Sameer Kanal, inclusive policy manager for the City of Portland
- Debbie Kitchin, Portland Charter commission member and small business owner
- Mike Marshall, nonprofit director
- Will Mespelt, property manager
- Christopher Olson, nonprofit communications specialist
- Jennifer Park, nonprofit program director
- Tiffani Penson, Manager of People and Culture for the City of Portland
- Antonio Jamal PettyJohnBlue
- Elana Pirtle-Guiney, labor advocate and policy expert for Governor Kate Brown
- Dan Ryan, Portland City Commissioner
- Sam Sachs, founder of No Hate Zone
- Bob Simril, business advisor
- Laura Streib, nonprofit executive director
- Jonathan Tasini, union activist, Democratic Party strategist, and former candidate for US Senate in New York in 2006
- Liz Taylor
- Nat West, former owner of Reverend Nat's Hard Cider and TriMet bus driver
- Nabil Zaghloul, Director for social service programs at Multnomah County

==== Withdrawn ====
- Joseph Emerson
- Brooklyn Sherman, school district employee (endorsed Armstrong)
- Marc Koller, Independent Party candidate for Oregon's 3rd congressional district in 2018
- Alan Blake
- David Burnell, substance abuse counselor
- John Middleton, Vice President of the Board of Community Warehouse

==== Declined ====
- Sam Adams, former mayor of Portland (Running for Multnomah County Commission)

=== Results ===
2024 Portland, Oregon City Council election, District 2 results

2024 Portland, Oregon City Council election, District 2
| Party | Candidate | FPv% | Count | | | | | | | | | | | | | | | | | | | | | | |
| Party | Candidate | FPv% | 1 | 2 | 3 | 4 | 5 | 6 | 7 | 8 | 9 | 10 | 11 | 12 | 13 | 14 | 15 | 16 | 17 | 18 | 19 | 20 | 21 | 22 | 23 |
|---|---|---|---|---|---|---|---|---|---|---|---|---|---|---|---|---|---|---|---|---|---|---|---|---|---|
| Nonpartisan | Dan Ryan | 15.6 | 12,047 | 12,061 | 12,066 | 12,088 | 12,117 | 12,171 | 12,235 | 12,353 | 12,469 | 12,512 | 12,639 | 12,687 | 12,990 | 13,362 | 14,089 | 15,120 | 15,501 | 15,880 | 16,491 | 17,710 | 17,765.3 | 21,238.8 | 19,290 |
| Nonpartisan | Elana Pirtle-Guiney | 16.1 | 12,447 | 12,452 | 12,458 | 12,471 | 12,502 | 12,514 | 12,571 | 12,593 | 12,644 | 12,772 | 12,870 | 12,979 | 13,181 | 13,398 | 13,694 | 13,859 | 14,786 | 15,358 | 16,663 | 18,135 | 18,445.5 | 21,573.2 | 19,290 |
| Nonpartisan | Sameer Kanal | 12.9 | 9,924 | 9,929 | 9,945 | 9,958 | 9,980 | 10,024 | 10,070 | 10,091 | 10,188 | 10,373 | 10,503 | 10,892 | 10,983 | 11,132 | 11,277 | 11,452 | 12,355 | 14,260 | 17,540 | 20,366 | 19,290 | 19,290 | 19,290 |
| Nonpartisan | Tiffani Penson | 9.4 | 7,218 | 7,224 | 7,237 | 7,251 | 7,341 | 7,391 | 7,449 | 7,497 | 7,589 | 7,694 | 7,854 | 7,960 | 8,132 | 8,334 | 8,784 | 9,261 | 9,645 | 10,384 | 11,831 | 13,319 | 13,532.4 | | |
| Nonpartisan | Nat West | 7.1 | 5,462 | 5,466 | 5,480 | 5,494 | 5,519 | 5,560 | 5,634 | 5,674 | 5,719 | 5,856 | 6,008 | 6,187 | 6,368 | 6,572 | 6,777 | 7,036 | 7,598 | 8,460 | 9,231 | | | | |
| Nonpartisan | Michelle DePass | 8.9 | 6,838 | 6,847 | 6,863 | 6,877 | 6,908 | 6,928 | 6,988 | 6,998 | 7,058 | 7,110 | 7,184 | 7,226 | 7,341 | 7,420 | 7,576 | 7,698 | 7,994 | 8,293 | | | | | |
| Nonpartisan | Marnie Glickman | 5.2 | 3,997 | 3,998 | 4,004 | 4,011 | 4,029 | 4,052 | 4,080 | 4,089 | 4,131 | 4,210 | 4,394 | 4,544 | 4,584 | 4,695 | 4,839 | 4,953 | 5,326 | | | | | | |
| Nonpartisan | Jonathan Tasini | 4.4 | 3,404 | 3,408 | 3,415 | 3,431 | 3,446 | 3,461 | 3,502 | 3,533 | 3,562 | 3,633 | 3,663 | 3,864 | 3,918 | 4,101 | 4,241 | 4,369 | | | | | | | |
| Nonpartisan | Bob Simril | 3.3 | 2,520 | 2,523 | 2,531 | 2,563 | 2,580 | 2,623 | 2,642 | 2,750 | 2,813 | 2,839 | 2,884 | 2,909 | 3,071 | 3,269 | 3,607 | | | | | | | | |
| Nonpartisan | Mariah Hudson | 3.0 | 2,287 | 2,287 | 2,296 | 2,317 | 2,356 | 2,396 | 2,444 | 2,512 | 2,580 | 2,640 | 2,709 | 2,738 | 2,919 | 3,092 | | | | | | | | | |
| Nonpartisan | Michael (Mike) Marshall | 2.1 | 1,646 | 1,647 | 1,654 | 1,669 | 1,688 | 1,718 | 1,731 | 1,804 | 1,830 | 1,884 | 1,920 | 1,993 | 2,161 | | | | | | | | | | |
| Nonpartisan | James Armstrong | 1.9 | 1,476 | 1,480 | 1,488 | 1,497 | 1,520 | 1,600 | 1,689 | 1,763 | 1,783 | 1,815 | 1,887 | 1,959 | | | | | | | | | | | |
| Nonpartisan | Chris Olson | 1.6 | 1,233 | 1,234 | 1,238 | 1,247 | 1,269 | 1,290 | 1,296 | 1,311 | 1,322 | 1,461 | 1,532 | | | | | | | | | | | | |
| Nonpartisan | Debbie Kitchin | 1.6 | 1,228 | 1,233 | 1,238 | 1,245 | 1,265 | 1,290 | 1,309 | 1,338 | 1,361 | 1,403 | | | | | | | | | | | | | |
| Nonpartisan | Jennifer Park | 1.4 | 1,114 | 1,117 | 1,126 | 1,137 | 1,174 | 1,180 | 1,214 | 1,224 | 1,241 | | | | | | | | | | | | | | |
| Nonpartisan | Nabil Zaghloul | 1.1 | 834 | 835 | 849 | 856 | 872 | 883 | 897 | 909 | | | | | | | | | | | | | | | |
| Nonpartisan | Will Mespelt | 1.0 | 759 | 762 | 765 | 779 | 789 | 840 | 856 | | | | | | | | | | | | | | | | |
| Nonpartisan | Laura Streib | 0.9 | 707 | 708 | 711 | 716 | 755 | 767 | | | | | | | | | | | | | | | | | |
| Nonpartisan | Reuben Berlin | 0.9 | 656 | 659 | 665 | 673 | 676 | | | | | | | | | | | | | | | | | | |
| Nonpartisan | Liz Taylor | 0.8 | 628 | 630 | 646 | 651 | | | | | | | | | | | | | | | | | | | |
| Nonpartisan | Sam Sachs | 0.4 | 304 | 305 | 311 | | | | | | | | | | | | | | | | | | | | |
| Nonpartisan | Antonio Jamal PettyJohnBlue | 0.3 | 217 | 219 | | | | | | | | | | | | | | | | | | | | | |
| Nonpartisan | Uncertified Write In | 0.3 | 211 | | | | | | | | | | | | | | | | | | | | | | |
Quota: 19,290

== District 3 ==
2024 Portland, Oregon City Council election, District 3
- November 5, 2024
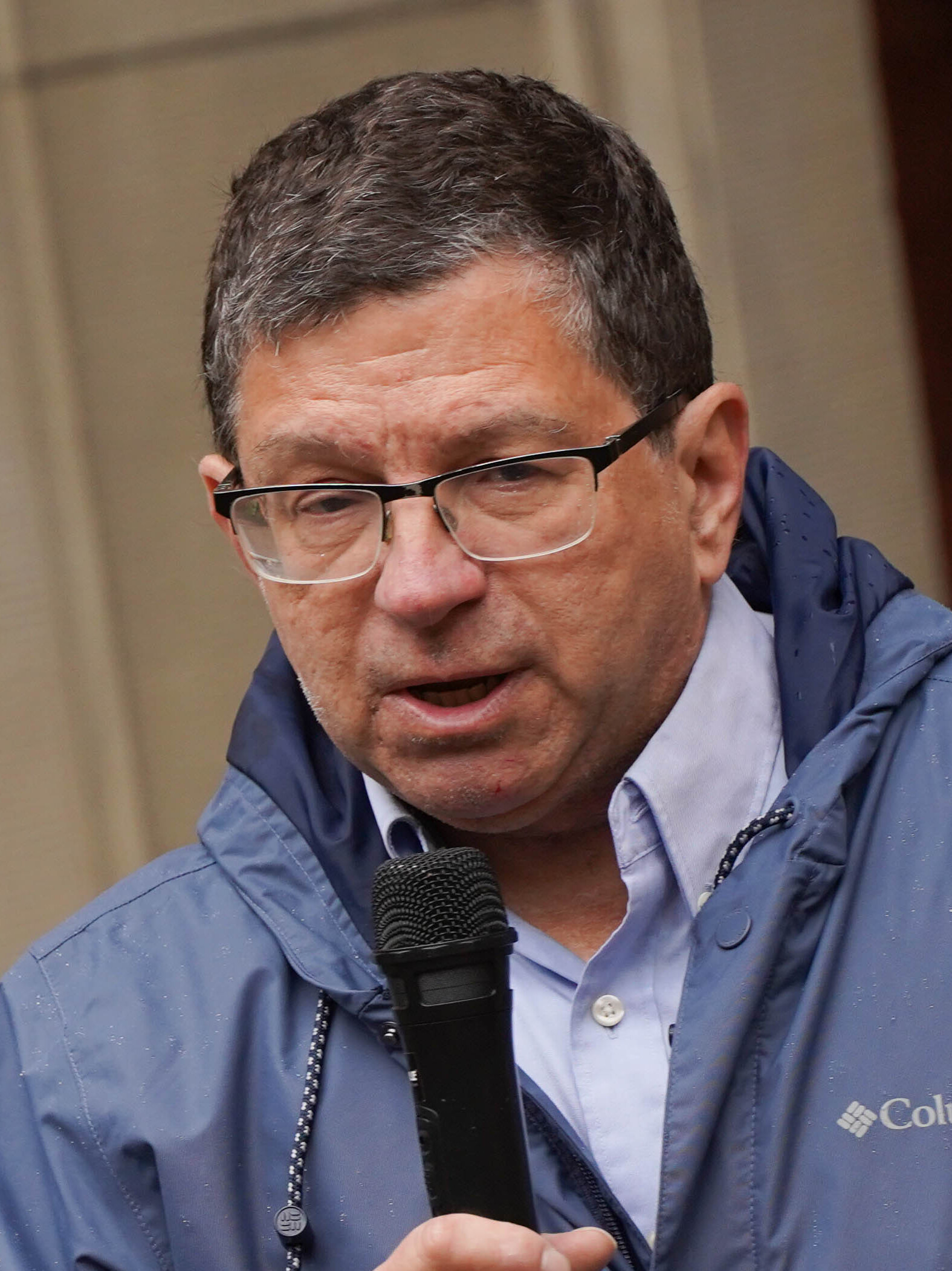

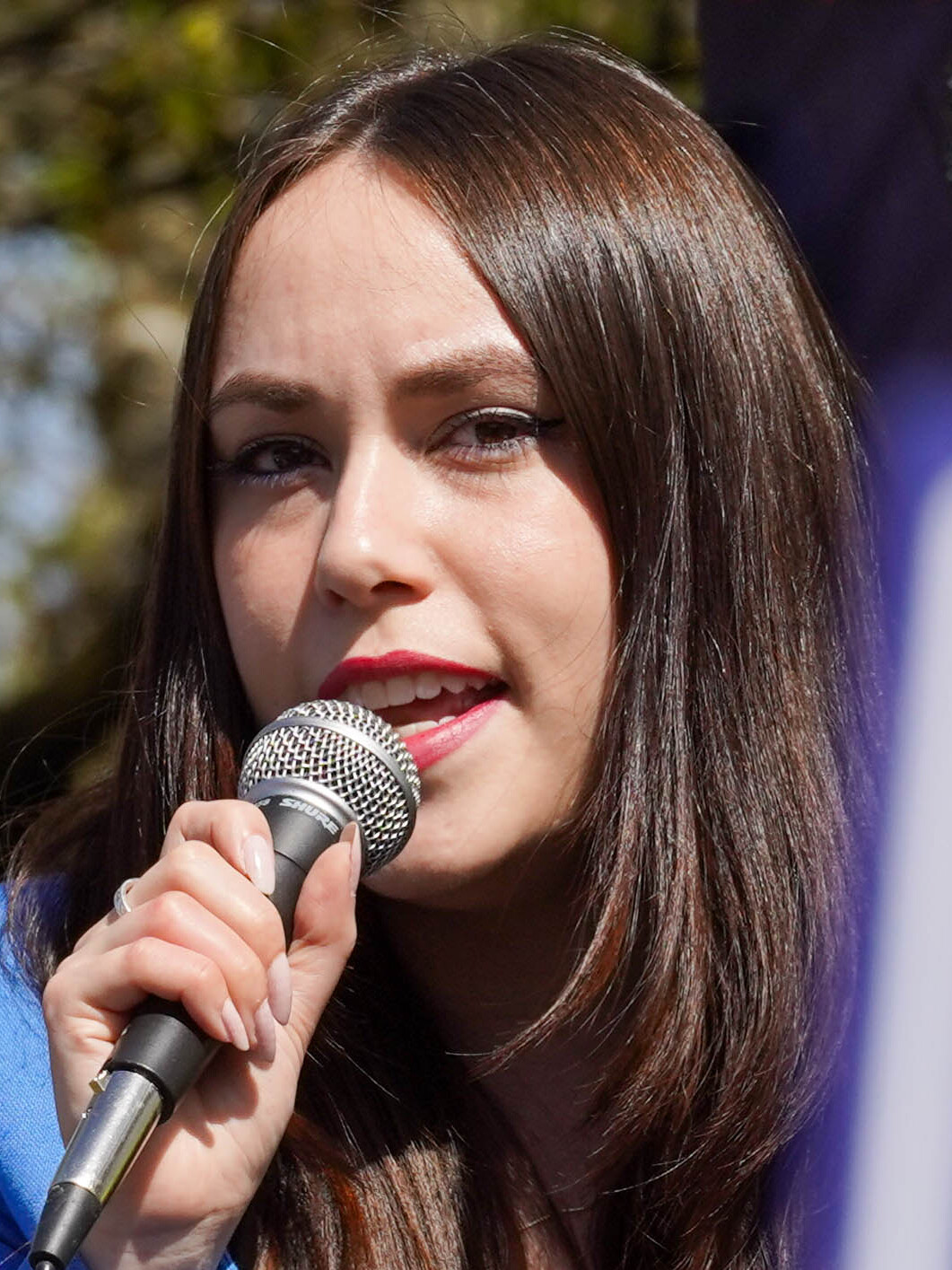

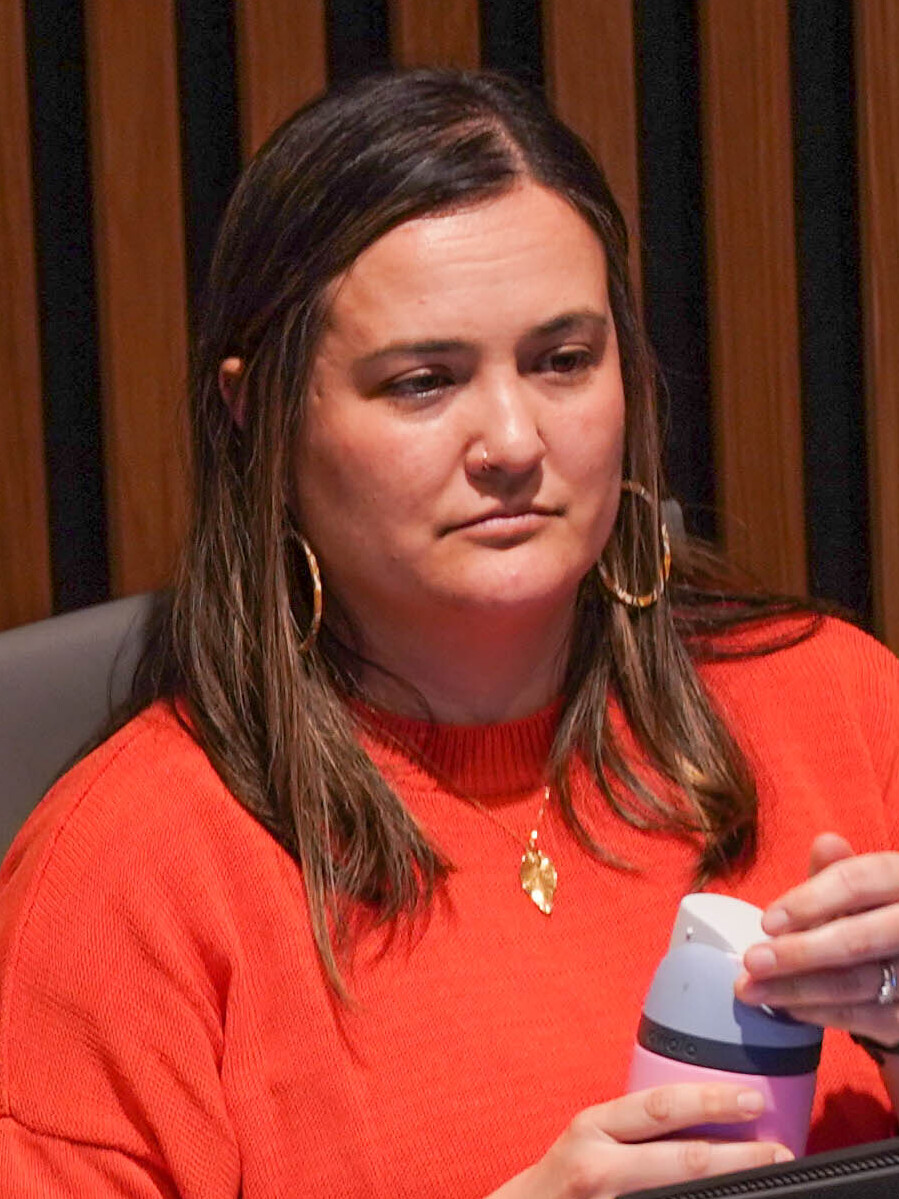

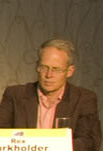

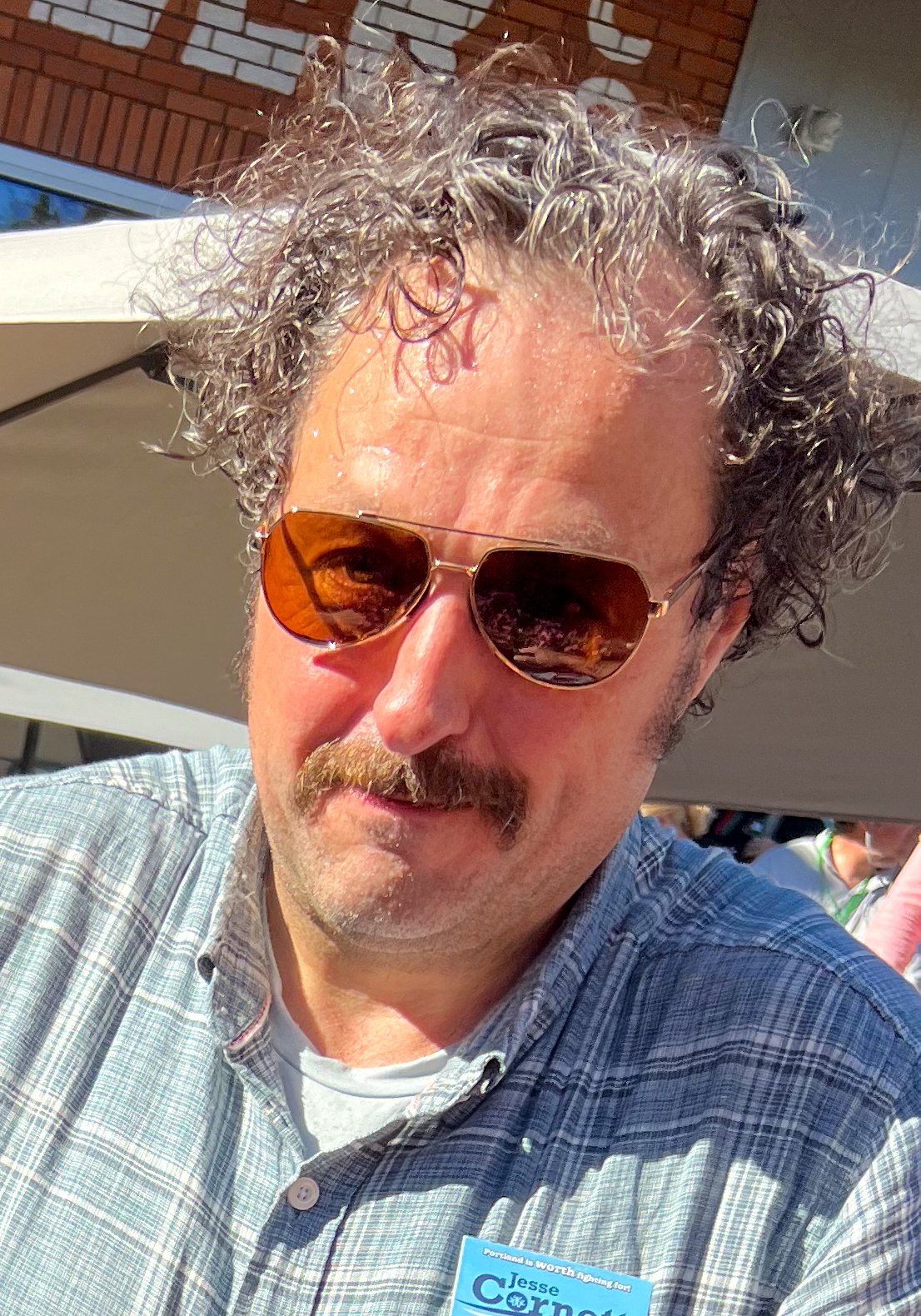
| Candidate | Steve Novick | Angelita Morillo | Tiffany Koyama Lane |
| First round | 20,098; 24.30% | 15,992; 19.33% | 15,945; 19.28% |
| Final round | 20,680; 25.00% | 20,680; 25.00% | 20,680; 25.00% |
| Candidate | Kezia Wanner | Rex Burkholder | Jesse Cornett |
| First round | 5,212; 6.30% | 3,869; 4.68% | 3,778; 4.57% |
| Final round | Eliminated | Eliminated | Eliminated |
City Councilors before election
Offices established
Elected City Councilors
Steve Novick
Angelita Morillo
Tiffany Koyama Lane

District 3 represents most of Southeast Portland south of Interstate 84 and west of Interstate 205, as well as a small sliver of Northeast Portland east of 47th Avenue and south of Prescott Avenue. Neighborhoods represented include Brentwood-Darlington, Brooklyn, Buckman, Creston-Kenilworth, Foster-Powell, Hosford-Abernethy (includes Ladd's Addition), Kerns, Laurelhurst, Madison South, Montavilla, Mt. Scott-Arleta, Mt. Tabor, North Tabor, Richmond, Rose City Park, Roseway, South Tabor, Sunnyside, and Woodstock.

=== Candidates ===
==== Declared ====
- Matt Anderson, high school teacher and U.S. Air Force veteran
- Sandeep Bali, pharmacist and candidate for city commission in 2022
- Melodie Bierwagen
- Christopher Brummer
- Rex Burkholder, founder, Bicycle Transportation Alliance and former Metro Council member
- Brian Conley, journalist
- Jesse Cornett, Bernie Sanders 2020 presidential campaign staffer and candidate for city council in 2010
- Daniel DeMelo, software engineer and chair of the Portland Joint Office of Homeless Services Community Budget Advisory Committee
- Chris Flanary, Portland Housing Bureau employee
- Dan Gilk
- Theo Hathaway Saner
- Clifford Higgins
- Kelly Janes (KJ)
- Harrison Kass
- Phillippe Knab
- Tiffany Koyama Lane, teacher at Alameda Elementary School and Portland Association of Teachers leader
- Kenneth Landgraver III
- Angelita Morillo, policy advocate at Partners for a Hunger-Free Oregon, member of the Portland Rental Services Commission, and social media influencer
- Steve Novick, former Portland City Commissioner
- Ahlam Osman, small business owner and environmental activist
- Cristal Azul Otero, social worker
- Terry Parker
- Heart Free Pham
- John Sweeney
- Kezia Wanner, Oregon Department of Emergency Management business & compliance director
- Luke Zak, political organizer and destination management professional

==== Campaign Suspended ====
- Jaclyn Smith-Moore, web developer

==== Potential ====
- Rachel Clark, small business manager and daughter of former mayor Bud Clark

==== Withdrawn ====
- Mu-Yin Chen, musician and motivational speaker
- Robin Ye, chief of staff to state representative Khanh Pham and former Portland Charter Commissioner

==== Failed to qualify ====
- Tony Morse, substance abuse nonprofit executive (running in District 4)

=== Results ===
District 3 results

2024 Portland, Oregon City Council election, District 3 results
| Party | Candidate | FPv% | Count | | | | | | | | | | | | | | | | | | | | | | | | | | | | | |
| Party | Candidate | FPv% | 1 | 2 | 3 | 4 | 5 | 6 | 7 | 8 | 9 | 10 | 11 | 12 | 13 | 14 | 15 | 16 | 17 | 18 | 19 | 20 | 21 | 22 | 23 | 24 | 25 | 26 | 27 | 28 | 29 | 30 |
|---|---|---|---|---|---|---|---|---|---|---|---|---|---|---|---|---|---|---|---|---|---|---|---|---|---|---|---|---|---|---|---|---|
| Nonpartisan | Steve Novick | 24.2 | 20,457 | 20,468 | 20,479 | 20,500 | 20,508 | 20,518 | 20,539 | 20,553 | 20,566 | 20,590 | 20,620 | 20,668 | 20,698 | 20,735 | 20,789 | 20,844 | 20,873 | 20,936 | 21,015 | 21,141 | 21,129 | 21,129 | 21,129 | 21,129 | 21,129 | 21,129 | 21,129 | 21,129 | 21,129 | 21,129 |
| Nonpartisan | Angelita Morillo | 19.4 | 16,399 | 16,411 | 16,415 | 16,424 | 16,440 | 16,482 | 16,512 | 16,547 | 16,554 | 16,568 | 16,589 | 16,607 | 16,616 | 16,696 | 16,799 | 16,869 | 17,098 | 17,168 | 17,262 | 17,725 | 17,726.3 | 17,863.3 | 18,388.4 | 18,631.4 | 18,849.4 | 19,246.7 | 19,380.8 | 20,589 | 22,312.7 | 21,129 |
| Nonpartisan | Tiffany Koyama Lane | 19.3 | 16,320 | 16,326 | 16,333 | 16,338 | 16,348 | 16,369 | 16,387 | 16,406 | 16,424 | 16,429 | 16,449 | 16,484 | 16,494 | 16,545 | 16,624 | 16,690 | 16,818 | 16,879 | 17,036 | 17,406 | 17,407 | 17,623 | 17,884.1 | 18,114.1 | 18,308.1 | 18,677.3 | 18,910.3 | 20,108.5 | 21,670.8 | 21,129 |
| Nonpartisan | Kezia Wanner | 6.3 | 5,313 | 5,314 | 5,317 | 5,319 | 5,329 | 5,337 | 5,340 | 5,349 | 5,353 | 5,369 | 5,374 | 5,397 | 5,425 | 5,448 | 5,466 | 5,485 | 5,505 | 5,558 | 5,696 | 5,714 | 5,715.05 | 5,907.06 | 6,031.09 | 6,330.11 | 6,808.14 | 7,023.22 | 8,808.29 | 9,634.56 | 10,523.8 | 10,669.2 |
| Nonpartisan | Rex Burkholder | 4.7 | 3,951 | 3,958 | 3,968 | 3,974 | 3,986 | 3,988 | 3,995 | 4,006 | 4,008 | 4,016 | 4,031 | 4,048 | 4,064 | 4,093 | 4,135 | 4,160 | 4,191 | 4,279 | 4,374 | 4,443 | 4,443.96 | 4,634.99 | 4,781.09 | 4,949.1 | 5,126.11 | 5,621.76 | 5,890.79 | 6,812.1 | | |
| Nonpartisan | Jesse Cornett | 4.6 | 3,860 | 3,863 | 3,872 | 3,875 | 3,885 | 3,890 | 3,905 | 3,915 | 3,916 | 3,919 | 3,927 | 3,940 | 3,955 | 4,014 | 4,052 | 4,077 | 4,099 | 4,146 | 4,195 | 4,326 | 4,326.96 | 4,448.98 | 4,539.03 | 4,834.06 | 4,976.07 | 5,217.26 | 5,440.28 | | | |
| Nonpartisan | Harrison Kass | 3.3 | 2,786 | 2,791 | 2,794 | 2,800 | 2,814 | 2,814 | 2,818 | 2,822 | 2,823 | 2,831 | 2,836 | 2,853 | 2,897 | 2,912 | 2,929 | 2,941 | 2,949 | 3,007 | 3,083 | 3,105 | 3,105.19 | 3,183.2 | 3,215.2 | 3,471.22 | 3,809.22 | 3,966.24 | | | | |
| Nonpartisan | Philippe Knab | 1.8 | 1,551 | 1,553 | 1,555 | 1,558 | 1,562 | 1,565 | 1,569 | 1,576 | 1,578 | 1,580 | 1,587 | 1,608 | 1,616 | 1,657 | 1,660 | 1,670 | 1,689 | 1,732 | 1,765 | 1,803 | 1,806.05 | 1,928.08 | 2,293.34 | 2,380.36 | 2,476.36 | | | | | |
| Nonpartisan | Sandeep Bali | 1.7 | 1,408 | 1,409 | 1,413 | 1,416 | 1,423 | 1,424 | 1,427 | 1,430 | 1,432 | 1,441 | 1,449 | 1,474 | 1,512 | 1,522 | 1,537 | 1,583 | 1,622 | 1,716 | 1,871 | 1,906 | 1,906.08 | 2,017.09 | 2,114.09 | 2,229.1 | | | | | | |
| Nonpartisan | Daniel DeMelo | 1.9 | 1,571 | 1,573 | 1,574 | 1,575 | 1,582 | 1,584 | 1,594 | 1,603 | 1,609 | 1,620 | 1,624 | 1,642 | 1,661 | 1,683 | 1,743 | 1,765 | 1,787 | 1,822 | 1,883 | 1,950 | 1,950.19 | 2,061.2 | 2,111.21 | | | | | | | |
| Nonpartisan | Cristal Azul Otero | 1.7 | 1,405 | 1,405 | 1,407 | 1,407 | 1,413 | 1,425 | 1,433 | 1,446 | 1,449 | 1,453 | 1,465 | 1,477 | 1,487 | 1,505 | 1,522 | 1,555 | 1,624 | 1,657 | 1,736 | 1,809 | 1,809.63 | 1,906.64 | | | | | | | | |
| Nonpartisan | Jonathan (Jon) Walker | 1.6 | 1,322 | 1,324 | 1,327 | 1,338 | 1,343 | 1,345 | 1,356 | 1,360 | 1,364 | 1,369 | 1,374 | 1,394 | 1,425 | 1,447 | 1,462 | 1,487 | 1,497 | 1,541 | 1,609 | 1,665 | 1,665.18 | | | | | | | | | |
| Nonpartisan | Chris Flanary | 1.5 | 1,242 | 1,248 | 1,253 | 1,258 | 1,267 | 1,273 | 1,287 | 1,300 | 1,302 | 1,317 | 1,327 | 1,337 | 1,345 | 1,396 | 1,450 | 1,471 | 1,525 | 1,559 | 1,608 | | | | | | | | | | | |
| Nonpartisan | Melodie Beirwagen | 1.3 | 1,132 | 1,133 | 1,138 | 1,140 | 1,145 | 1,156 | 1,160 | 1,171 | 1,176 | 1,183 | 1,196 | 1,209 | 1,252 | 1,266 | 1,275 | 1,304 | 1,326 | 1,396 | | | | | | | | | | | | |
| Nonpartisan | Matthew (Matt) Anderson | 0.9 | 755 | 756 | 769 | 774 | 783 | 789 | 790 | 796 | 796 | 805 | 817 | 827 | 854 | 878 | 893 | 924 | 964 | | | | | | | | | | | | | |
| Nonpartisan | Ahlam K Osman | 0.8 | 709 | 716 | 717 | 718 | 719 | 725 | 733 | 745 | 746 | 749 | 761 | 767 | 772 | 784 | 794 | 827 | | | | | | | | | | | | | | |
| Nonpartisan | Heart Free Pham | 0.6 | 546 | 548 | 557 | 561 | 567 | 573 | 578 | 584 | 589 | 598 | 606 | 612 | 632 | 649 | 661 | | | | | | | | | | | | | | | |
| Nonpartisan | Luke Zak | 0.6 | 548 | 551 | 556 | 559 | 564 | 570 | 585 | 594 | 595 | 601 | 603 | 612 | 616 | 633 | | | | | | | | | | | | | | | | |
| Nonpartisan | Brian Conley | 0.6 | 506 | 507 | 516 | 525 | 534 | 539 | 547 | 552 | 554 | 566 | 575 | 581 | 598 | | | | | | | | | | | | | | | | | |
| Nonpartisan | Terry Parker | 0.4 | 375 | 377 | 390 | 400 | 403 | 412 | 413 | 418 | 418 | 435 | 444 | 458 | | | | | | | | | | | | | | | | | | |
| Nonpartisan | Dan Gilk | 0.4 | 330 | 331 | 337 | 344 | 344 | 347 | 348 | 351 | 355 | 358 | 372 | | | | | | | | | | | | | | | | | | | |
| Nonpartisan | Christopher Brummer | 0.3 | 263 | 264 | 264 | 269 | 271 | 272 | 274 | 278 | 279 | 284 | | | | | | | | | | | | | | | | | | | | |
| Nonpartisan | John Sweeney | 0.3 | 236 | 239 | 247 | 251 | 254 | 257 | 260 | 266 | 271 | | | | | | | | | | | | | | | | | | | | | |
| Nonpartisan | Uncertified Write In | 0.3 | 248 | 249 | 249 | 249 | 250 | 250 | 250 | 251 | | | | | | | | | | | | | | | | | | | | | | |
| Nonpartisan | Kelly Janes (KJ) | 0.3 | 225 | 226 | 230 | 236 | 237 | 245 | 248 | | | | | | | | | | | | | | | | | | | | | | | |
| Nonpartisan | Theo Hathaway Saner | 0.3 | 219 | 220 | 225 | 225 | 230 | 233 | | | | | | | | | | | | | | | | | | | | | | | | |
| Nonpartisan | Jaclyn Smith-Moore | 0.2 | 194 | 198 | 198 | 200 | 203 | | | | | | | | | | | | | | | | | | | | | | | | | |
| Nonpartisan | Patrick Hilton | 0.2 | 194 | 198 | 199 | 200 | | | | | | | | | | | | | | | | | | | | | | | | | | |
| Nonpartisan | David O'Connor | 0.2 | 174 | 176 | 177 | | | | | | | | | | | | | | | | | | | | | | | | | | | |
| Nonpartisan | Kenneth (Kent) R Landgraver III | 0.2 | 172 | 174 | | | | | | | | | | | | | | | | | | | | | | | | | | | | |
| Nonpartisan | Clifford Higgins | 0.1 | 104 | | | | | | | | | | | | | | | | | | | | | | | | | | | | | |
Quota: 21,129

== District 4 ==
2024 Portland, Oregon City Council election, District 4
- November 5, 2024
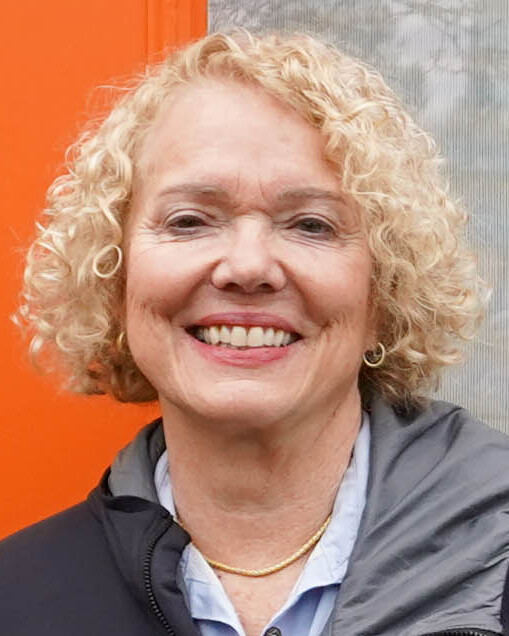

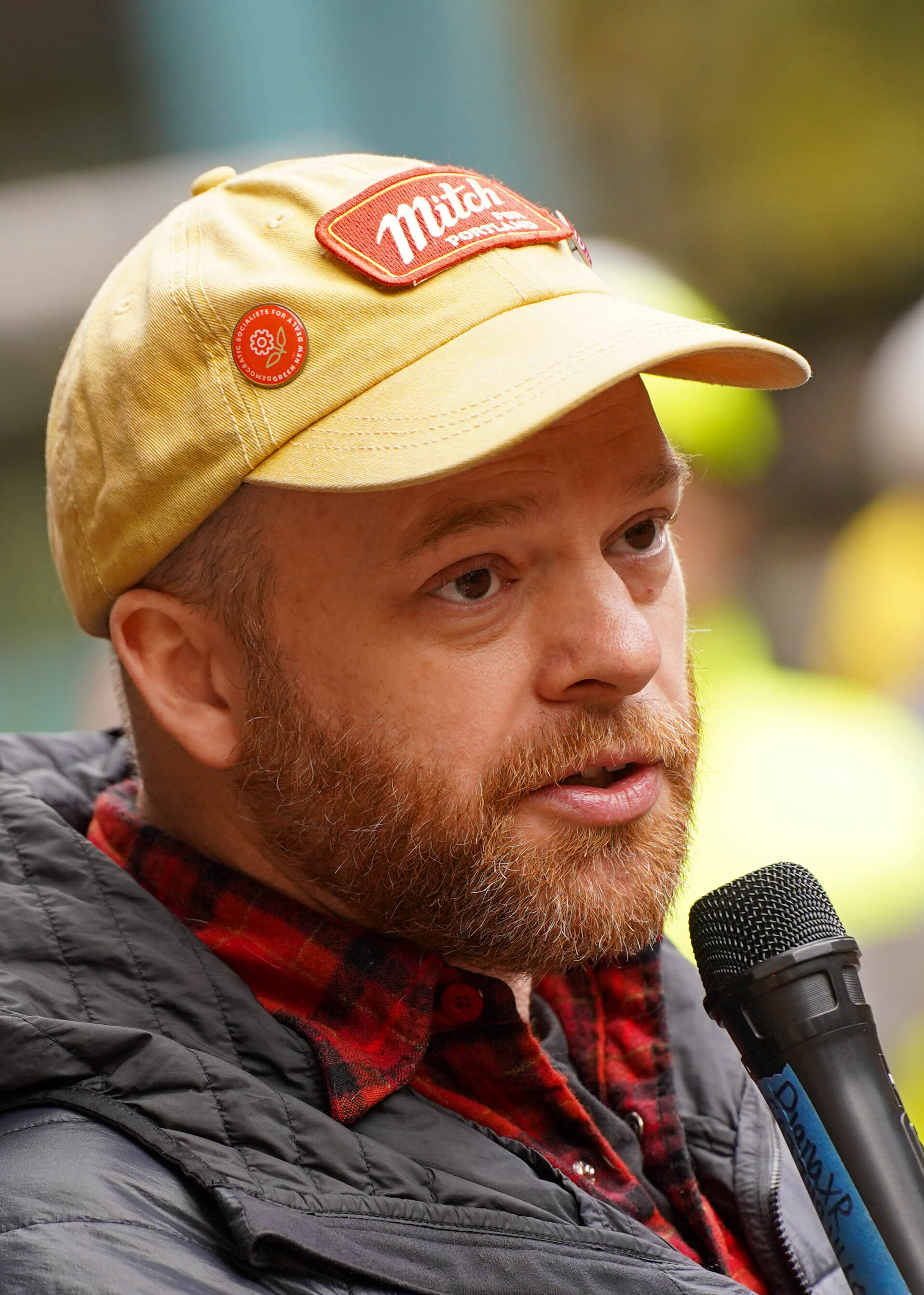

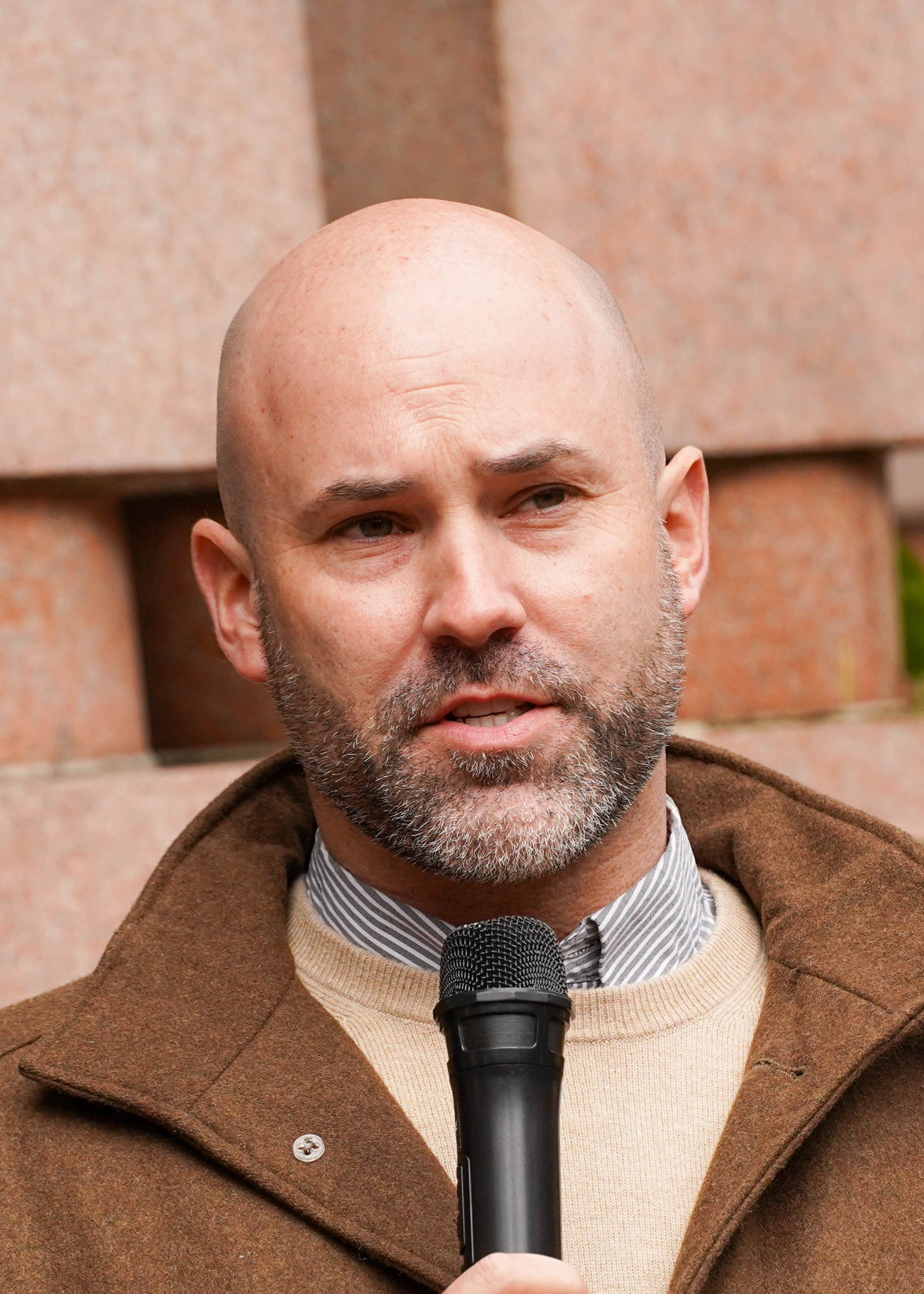

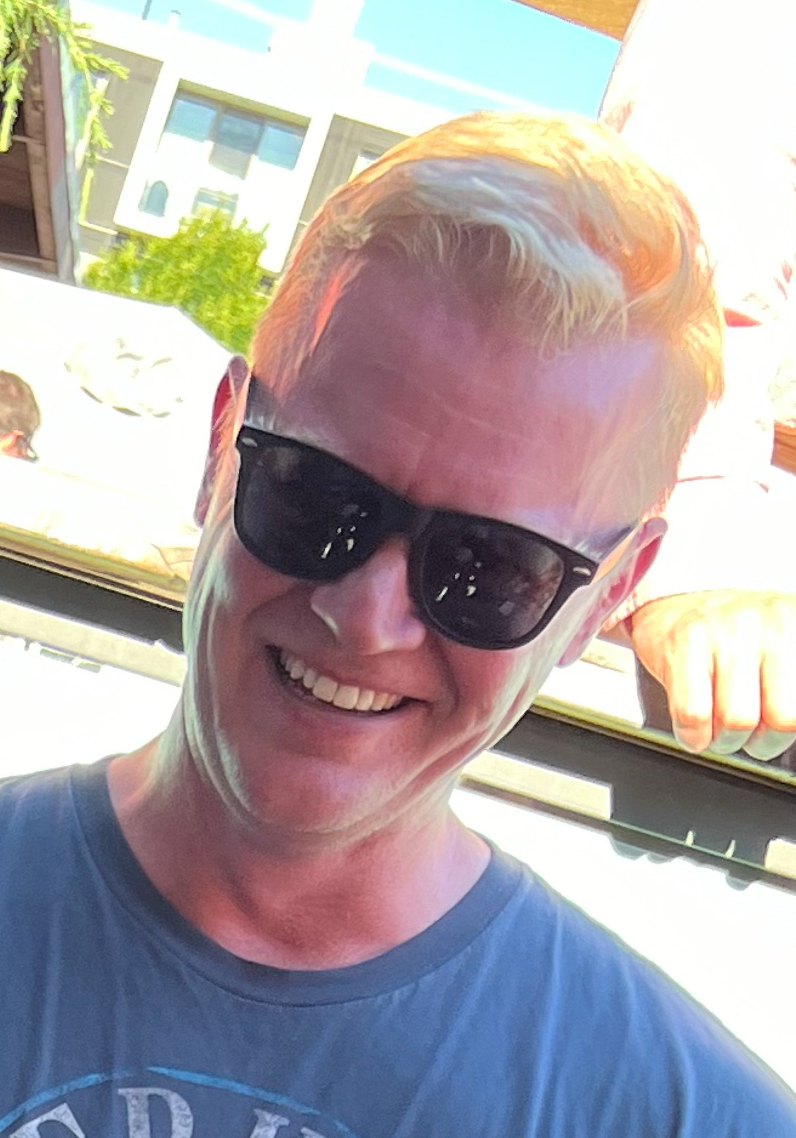

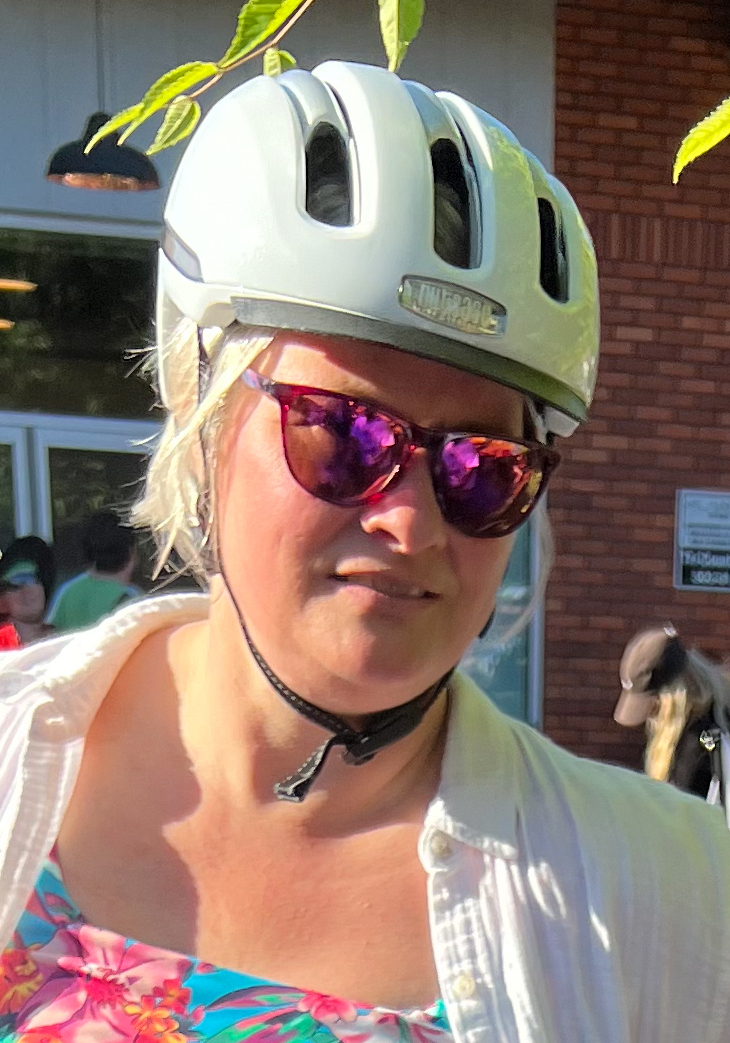

| Candidate | Olivia Clark | Mitch Green | Eric Zimmerman |
| First round | 18,642; 25.02% | 10,006; 13.43% | 7,809; 10.48% |
| Final round | 18,628; 25.00% | 18,628; 25.00% | 18,628; 25.00% |
| Candidate | Eli Arnold | Sarah Silkie | Chad Lykins |
| First round | 7,936; 10.65% | 4,297; 5.77% | 4,654; 6.25% |
| Final round | Eliminated | Eliminated | Eliminated |
City Councilors before election
Offices established
Elected City Councilors
Olivia Clark
Mitch Green
Eric Zimmerman

District 4 represents all of Portland west of the Willamette River (its Northwest, Southwest, and South sextants) as well as the Eastmoreland, Reed, and Sellwood-Moreland neighborhoods in southeast Portland. Neighborhoods represented include Arlington Heights, Arnold Creek, Ashcreek, Bridlemile (includes Glencullen), Collins View, Crestwood, Downtown, Eastmoreland, Far Southwest, Forest Park, Goose Hollow, Hayhurst (includes Vermont Hills), Hillsdale, Hillside, Homestead, Linnton, Maplewood, Markham, Marshall Park, Multnomah (includes Multnomah Village), Northwest District (includes Uptown, Nob Hill, Alphabet Historic District), Northwest Heights, Northwest Industrial, Old Town Chinatown, Pearl District, Reed, Sellwood-Moreland, South Burlingame, South Portland (includes Corbett, Fulton, Lair Hill, Terwilliger, and the Johns Landing and South Waterfront developments), Southwest Hills, Sylvan-Highlands, and West Portland Park (includes Capitol Hill).

This district's election was notable for having the only change in the winner due to transfers performed under the single transferable vote system. (However in other elections where party labels are used, election results under STV are easily seen to vary widely from what they were under FPTP or block voting, and this is seen in the first count even before any transfers, due to each voter having just one vote in a multi-winner contest. Relatively seldom do transfers change the candidates in winning positions.)

Eli Arnold captured the third-most first preferences in the first round of tabulation, leading Eric Zimmerman by just over 100 votes. However, Zimmerman received enough transfers (due voters' second- through sixth-place rankings on ballots that were transferred from eliminated candidates) to surpass Arnold's final vote total by just under 800 votes in further rounds of tabulation, and beat him out to the district's third seat.

=== Candidates ===
==== Declared ====
- Joe Alfone
- Eli Arnold, police officer with the Portland Police Bureau
- Bob Callahan
- Patrick Cashman
- Olivia Clark, former legislative director of the city of Salem, Oregon
- Raquel Coyote
- Michael DiNapoli, event technician
- Kelly Doyle
- Brandon Farley, videographer and conservative activist
- Lisa Freeman
- John Goldsmith
- Kevin Goldsmith
- Mitch Green, economist at Bonneville Power Administration
- Chris Henry, trucker and perennial candidate
- Ben Hufford
- Chad Lykins, executive director of Rose City Chess
- Tony Morse, substance abuse nonprofit executive
- Lee Odell
- Stan Penkin, Pearl District Neighborhood Association President
- L. Christopher Regis
- Moses Ross, political consultant and chair of the Multnomah Neighborhood Association
- Tony Schwartz
- Sarah Silkie, Portland Water Bureau engineer
- Ciatta Thompson
- John Toran, dispensary owner
- Michael Trimble
- Andra Vltavín
- Bob Weinstein, former mayor of Ketchikan, Alaska
- Eric Zimmerman, chief of staff to Julia Brim-Edwards

==== Withdrawn ====
- Chomba Kaluba
- Jeremy Beausoleil Smith

==== Declined ====
- Vadim Mozyrsky, administrative law judge and candidate for city commission in 2022 (running for Multnomah County Commission)

=== Results ===
2024 Portland, Oregon City Council election, District 4 results

2024 Portland, Oregon City Council election, District 4
| Party | Candidate | FPv% | Count | | | | | | | | | | | | | | | | | | | | | | | | | | | | | | | |
| Party | Candidate | FPv% | 1 | 2 | 3 | 4 | 5 | 6 | 7 | 8 | 9 | 10 | 11 | 12 | 13 | 14 | 15 | 16 | 17 | 18 | 19 | 20 | 21 | 22 | 23 | 24 | 25 | 26 | 27 | 28 | 29 | 30 | 31 | Count 32 |
|---|---|---|---|---|---|---|---|---|---|---|---|---|---|---|---|---|---|---|---|---|---|---|---|---|---|---|---|---|---|---|---|---|---|---|
| Nonpartisan | Olivia Clark | 24.9 | 19,138 | 19,140 | 19,151 | 19,157 | 19,160 | 19,165 | 19,182 | 19,180 | 19,180 | 19,180 | 19,180 | 19,180 | 19,180 | 19,180 | 19,180 | 19,180 | 19,180 | 19,180 | 19,180 | 19,180 | 19,180 | 19,180 | 19,180 | 19,180 | 19,180 | 19,180 | 19,180 | 19,180 | 19,180 | 19,180 | 19,180 | 19,180 |
| Nonpartisan | Mitch Green | 13.5 | 10,387 | 10,388 | 10,389 | 10,404 | 10,410 | 10,412 | 10,419 | 10,419.1 | 10,424.1 | 10,442.1 | 10,461.1 | 10,487.1 | 10,544.1 | 10,556.1 | 10,588.1 | 10,628.1 | 10,676.1 | 10,728.1 | 10,803.1 | 10,881.1 | 10,991.1 | 11,187.1 | 11,639.1 | 11,751.1 | 12,019.1 | 12,816.1 | 14,412.2 | 16,700.2 | 20,153.3 | 19,180 | 19,180 | 19,180 |
| Nonpartisan | Eric Zimmerman | 10.4 | 8,005 | 8,005 | 8,013 | 8,015 | 8,035 | 8,059 | 8,065 | 8,065.93 | 8,072.93 | 8,085.93 | 8,091.93 | 8,102.93 | 8,107.93 | 8,120.93 | 8,149.93 | 8,171.93 | 8,231.94 | 8,329.94 | 8,492.94 | 8,722.95 | 8,809.95 | 8,938.95 | 8,973.95 | 9,403.96 | 10,156 | 11,052 | 11,507 | 12,344 | 13,656.1 | 13,773.2 | 20,232.2 | 19,180 |
| Nonpartisan | Eli Arnold | 10.6 | 8,123 | 8,123 | 8,124 | 8,132 | 8,146 | 8,180 | 8,188 | 8,188.19 | 8,194.19 | 8,203.19 | 8,220.19 | 8,237.19 | 8,245.19 | 8,252.19 | 8,263.19 | 8,289.19 | 8,319.19 | 8,482.2 | 8,666.2 | 8,863.21 | 8,913.21 | 9,177.21 | 9,217.21 | 9,632.21 | 9,921.22 | 11,178.2 | 11,478.3 | 12,085.3 | 12,810.3 | 12,899.5 | | |
| Nonpartisan | Sarah Silkie | 5.8 | 4,415 | 4,417 | 4,424 | 4,425 | 4,428 | 4,431 | 4,460 | 4,460.18 | 4,467.18 | 4,489.18 | 4,499.18 | 4,509.18 | 4,535.18 | 4,581.18 | 4,617.18 | 4,682.19 | 4,770.19 | 4,846.19 | 4,906.19 | 4,975.19 | 5,152.19 | 5,280.2 | 5,599.2 | 5,779.2 | 5,989.21 | 6,366.22 | 7,698.26 | 9,318.28 | | | | |
| Nonpartisan | Chad Lykins | 6.2 | 4,757 | 4,757 | 4,766 | 4,769 | 4,769 | 4,771 | 4,780 | 4,780.07 | 4,784.07 | 4,799.07 | 4,814.07 | 4,825.07 | 4,844.07 | 4,847.07 | 4,867.07 | 4,905.07 | 4,966.07 | 5,009.07 | 5,080.07 | 5,138.07 | 5,236.07 | 5,319.07 | 5,473.07 | 5,599.08 | 5,946.08 | 6,241.09 | 7,038.1 | | | | | |
| Nonpartisan | Lisa Freeman | 4.9 | 3,749 | 3,749 | 3,752 | 3,754 | 3,758 | 3,763 | 3,782 | 3,782.1 | 3,787.1 | 3,814.1 | 3,843.1 | 3,852.1 | 3,884.1 | 3,929.1 | 3,990.11 | 4,074.11 | 4,132.11 | 4,238.11 | 4,307.11 | 4,369.11 | 4,645.12 | 4,742.12 | 5,073.12 | 5,175.12 | 5,370.12 | 5,673.13 | | | | | | |
| Nonpartisan | Bob Weinstein | 5.1 | 3,891 | 3,892 | 3,899 | 3,900 | 3,901 | 3,903 | 3,910 | 3,910.07 | 3,918.07 | 3,930.07 | 3,937.07 | 3,958.07 | 3,964.07 | 3,974.07 | 3,994.07 | 4,019.07 | 4,064.07 | 4,116.07 | 4,191.07 | 4,357.07 | 4,397.07 | 4,530.08 | 4,617.08 | 4,856.08 | 4,978.08 | | | | | | | |
| Nonpartisan | Tony Morse | 2.6 | 2,004 | 2,004 | 2,009 | 2,013 | 2,015 | 2,019 | 2,020 | 2,020.05 | 2,022.05 | 2,031.05 | 2,042.05 | 2,055.05 | 2,065.05 | 2,066.05 | 2,076.05 | 2,091.05 | 2,113.05 | 2,159.05 | 2,209.05 | 2,270.05 | 2,330.05 | 2,434.05 | 2,539.05 | 2,659.06 | | | | | | | | |
| Nonpartisan | Ben Hufford | 2.2 | 1,694 | 1,694 | 1,698 | 1,698 | 1,700 | 1,705 | 1,706 | 1,706.04 | 1,709.04 | 1,711.04 | 1,714.04 | 1,718.04 | 1,730.04 | 1,733.04 | 1,741.04 | 1,750.04 | 1,767.04 | 1,832.04 | 1,909.04 | 1,966.04 | 2,023.04 | 2,089.04 | 2,107.04 | | | | | | | | | |
| Nonpartisan | Andra Vltavin | 1.8 | 1,355 | 1,355 | 1,356 | 1,359 | 1,360 | 1,360 | 1,365 | 1,365 | 1,369 | 1,388 | 1,404 | 1,408 | 1,441 | 1,466 | 1,473 | 1,535.01 | 1,555.01 | 1,564.01 | 1,593.01 | 1,604.01 | 1,738.01 | 1,803.01 | | | | | | | | | | |
| Nonpartisan | Kevin Goldsmith | 1.9 | 1,432 | 1,432 | 1,435 | 1,445 | 1,445 | 1,446 | 1,454 | 1,454.01 | 1,459.01 | 1,465.01 | 1,468.01 | 1,528.01 | 1,531.01 | 1,542.01 | 1,554.01 | 1,564.01 | 1,588.01 | 1,627.01 | 1,663.01 | 1,696.01 | 1,731.01 | | | | | | | | | | | |
| Nonpartisan | Chloe Mason | 1.3 | 979 | 980 | 984 | 988 | 990 | 993 | 1,001 | 1,001.01 | 1,004.01 | 1,011.01 | 1,020.01 | 1,029.01 | 1,046.01 | 1,091.01 | 1,105.01 | 1,189.01 | 1,212.01 | 1,241.01 | 1,338.02 | 1,352.02 | | | | | | | | | | | | |
| Nonpartisan | Stanley Penkin | 1.4 | 1,092 | 1,092 | 1,094 | 1,096 | 1,097 | 1,103 | 1,105 | 1,105.03 | 1,105.03 | 1,112.03 | 1,119.03 | 1,135.03 | 1,143.03 | 1,147.03 | 1,153.03 | 1,171.03 | 1,188.03 | 1,218.03 | 1,249.03 | | | | | | | | | | | | | |
| Nonpartisan | John Toran | 1.4 | 1,052 | 1,053 | 1,056 | 1,060 | 1,062 | 1,071 | 1,073 | 1,073.02 | 1,074.02 | 1,078.02 | 1,083.02 | 1,088.02 | 1,097.02 | 1,103.02 | 1,108.02 | 1,148.02 | 1,172.02 | 1,212.02 | | | | | | | | | | | | | | |
| Nonpartisan | Bob Callahan | 1.2 | 888 | 890 | 895 | 897 | 908 | 914 | 917 | 917.016 | 921.016 | 923.016 | 939.016 | 951.017 | 958.017 | 971.017 | 985.017 | 993.017 | 1,008.02 | | | | | | | | | | | | | | | |
| Nonpartisan | Moses Ross | 0.8 | 578 | 582 | 586 | 587 | 590 | 593 | 598 | 598.009 | 603.009 | 605.009 | 608.009 | 610.009 | 631.009 | 644.009 | 657.009 | 671.009 | | | | | | | | | | | | | | | | |
| Nonpartisan | Ciatta R Thompson | 0.7 | 531 | 531 | 532 | 535 | 537 | 544 | 547 | 547.006 | 548.006 | 559.006 | 567.006 | 570.006 | 579.006 | 592.007 | 602.007 | | | | | | | | | | | | | | | | | |
| Nonpartisan | Mike DiNapoli | 0.4 | 315 | 315 | 316 | 318 | 320 | 323 | 327 | 327.005 | 328.005 | 334.005 | 363.005 | 366.005 | 379.005 | 386.005 | | | | | | | | | | | | | | | | | | |
| Nonpartisan | Raquel Coyote | 0.4 | 317 | 319 | 319 | 319 | 322 | 325 | 329 | 329.003 | 333.003 | 338.003 | 344.003 | 355.003 | 361.003 | | | | | | | | | | | | | | | | | | | |
| Nonpartisan | Chris Henry | 0.4 | 301 | 302 | 303 | 304 | 304 | 305 | 309 | 309.002 | 310.002 | 323.003 | 333.003 | 341.003 | | | | | | | | | | | | | | | | | | | | |
| Nonpartisan | John J Goldsmith | 0.4 | 313 | 313 | 316 | 323 | 323 | 324 | 324 | 324.001 | 327.001 | 328.001 | 333.001 | | | | | | | | | | | | | | | | | | | | | |
| Nonpartisan | Joseph (Joe) Alfone | 0.3 | 257 | 257 | 258 | 260 | 263 | 265 | 268 | 268.003 | 270.003 | 272.003 | | | | | | | | | | | | | | | | | | | | | | |
| Nonpartisan | Michael Trimble | 0.3 | 230 | 230 | 230 | 230 | 231 | 234 | 237 | 237.002 | 237.002 | | | | | | | | | | | | | | | | | | | | | | | |
| Nonpartisan | Uncertified Write In | 0.3 | 232 | 232 | 232 | 233 | 233 | 233 | 233 | 233.001 | | | | | | | | | | | | | | | | | | | | | | | | |
| Nonpartisan | Kelly Doyle | 0.2 | 190 | 190 | 191 | 191 | 193 | 196 | | | | | | | | | | | | | | | | | | | | | | | | | | |
| Nonpartisan | Brandon Farley | 0.2 | 168 | 168 | 168 | 169 | 171 | | | | | | | | | | | | | | | | | | | | | | | | | | | |
| Nonpartisan | Patrick Cashman | 0.1 | 101 | 102 | 103 | 104 | | | | | | | | | | | | | | | | | | | | | | | | | | | | |
| Nonpartisan | Lee Odell | 0.1 | 100 | 101 | 102 | | | | | | | | | | | | | | | | | | | | | | | | | | | | | |
| Nonpartisan | Tony Schwartz | 0.1 | 100 | 100 | | | | | | | | | | | | | | | | | | | | | | | | | | | | | | |
| Nonpartisan | L Christopher Regis | 0.0 | 23 | | | | | | | | | | | | | | | | | | | | | | | | | | | | | | | |
Quota: 19,180

== See also ==
- 2024 Oregon elections
- 2024 Portland, Oregon Auditor election
- 2024 Portland, Oregon municipal elections
- 2024 Portland, Oregon, mayoral election
