= Portland's 1st City Council district (Oregon) =

City electoral district in Oregon, US

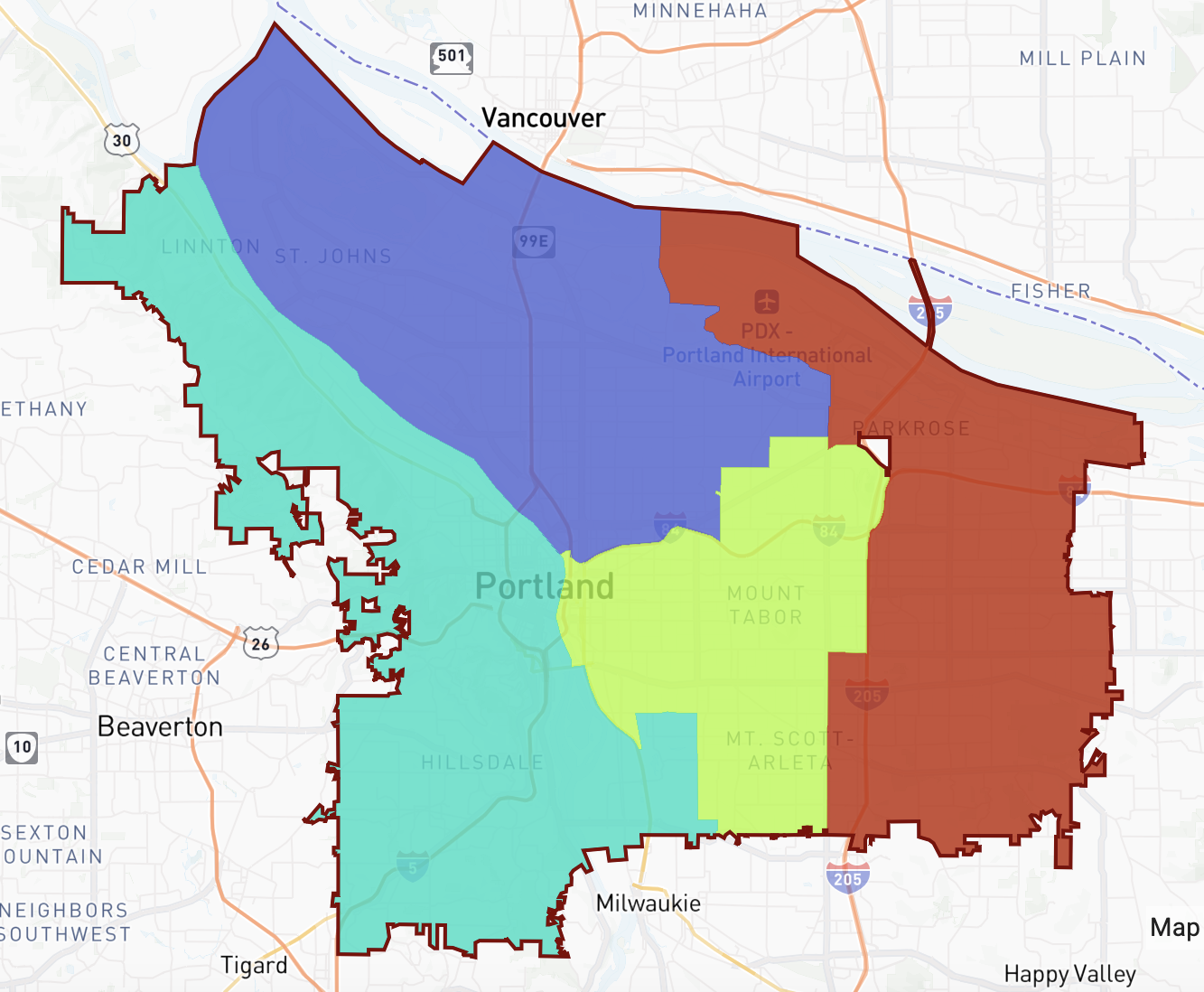
- The four districts electing members to Portland City Council. District 1 is shown in red.

Government
  - Type: Mayor-council government
  - Body: Portland City Council (Oregon)

Population (2023)
  - Total: 159,498

Demographics
  - White: 52.6%
  - Hispanic: 16.0%
  - Asian: 14.4%
  - Black: 8.4%
  - Native Hawaiian & Pacific Islander: 6.1%
  - American Indian: 1.2%

Registration
  - Democratic: 39%
  - Republican: 14%
  - Non-affiliated voters (NAVs): 41%
  - Other party: 6%

Portland's 1st City Council district is one of four multi-member districts electing three people to Portland City Council in Portland, Oregon. The district is located in the eastern part of the city and comprises primarily of parts of the city east of Interstate 205 all the way to the city's eastern border with Gresham, as well as Portland International Airport.

The district contains the neighborhoods of Argay, Centennial, Glenfair, Hazelwood, Lents, Mill Park, Parkrose, Parkrose Heights, Pleasant Valley, Powellhurst-Gilbert, Russell, Sumner, Wilkes, and Woodland Park.

District 1 is currently represented on Portland City Council by Candace Avalos, Loretta Smith, and Jamie Dunphy. They were elected to four-year terms in 2024.

== Election results ==
=== 2024 ===
2024 Portland, Oregon City Council election, District 1 results

2024 Portland, Oregon City Council election, District 1
Party	Candidate	FPv%	Count																
Party	Candidate	FPv%	1	2	3	4	5	6	7	8	9	10	11	12	13	14	15	16	17
Nonpartisan	Candace Avalos	19.4	8,297	8,307	8,337	8,368	8,543	8,637	8,726	8,789	8,938	9,237	9,372	10,649	12,169	10,718	10,718	10,718	10,718
Nonpartisan	Loretta Smith	13.0	5,586	5,595	5,608	5,634	5,687	5,767	5,889	5,999	6,158	6,399	6,689	7,198	7,953	8,207.25	9,172.84	12,027.1	10,718
Nonpartisan	Jamie Dunphy	11.8	5,064	5,068	5,075	5,108	5,146	5,180	5,250	5,303	5,412	5,483	5,635	6,079	7,305	7,893.25	8,491.6	9,749.63	9,749.63
Nonpartisan	Terrence Hayes	9.3	3,975	3,984	4,003	4,046	4,078	4,172	4,251	4,314	4,445	4,525	4,847	5,214	5,787	5,952.93	7,682.34		
Nonpartisan	Noah Ernst	9.5	4,052	4,060	4,082	4,095	4,129	4,190	4,251	4,360	4,479	4,642	5,116	5,658	5,883	5,935.57			
Nonpartisan	Steph Routh	9.1	3,894	3,898	3,904	3,940	3,997	4,033	4,095	4,155	4,266	4,332	4,500	5,089					
Nonpartisan	Timur Ender	8.3	3,550	3,556	3,567	3,586	3,662	3,699	3,784	3,861	3,983	4,187	4,335						
Nonpartisan	Doug Clove	4.0	1,698	1,709	1,736	1,765	1,795	1,883	1,977	2,129	2,302	2,403							
Nonpartisan	Peggy Sue Owens	3.0	1,266	1,269	1,279	1,294	1,321	1,333	1,365	1,441	1,501								
Nonpartisan	David Linn	2.6	1,111	1,113	1,130	1,150	1,195	1,226	1,308	1,441									
Nonpartisan	Joe Allen	2.3	978	981	1,011	1,026	1,040	1,068	1,141										
Nonpartisan	Michael (Mike) Sands	2.2	952	957	987	1,013	1,033	1,063											
Nonpartisan	Deian Salazar	1.7	720	720	741	754	789												
Nonpartisan	Cayle Tern	1.7	711	713	726	741													
Nonpartisan	Thomas Shervey	0.9	385	387	402														
Nonpartisan	Joe Furi	0.8	355	361															
Nonpartisan	Uncertified Write In	0.6	277																
Quota: 10,718
