= Eli Arnold =

- Eli Arnold at Bike Happy Hour in 2024
- Education: Oregon Department of Public Safety Standards and Training United States Army Intelligence Center Portland State University
- Occupation: Police officer
- Website: eliforportland.com

Eli Arnold is a police officer with the Portland Police Bureau. He was a candidate for Portland City Council in District 4 in the 2024 and 2026 elections.

== Career ==
After moving to Portland in 2001, Arnold joined the Army. He served in various roles including electronics repair, intelligence analyst, and Black Hawk pilot.

When Arnold returned to Portland in 2015, he was "looking for something community oriented to do" and initially applied to lead the city's community garden program. He later applied to be a background investigator at the police department, and someone suggested he become an officer instead.

== 2024 city council campaign ==
In his first campaign, Arnold "ran largely on a law-and-order platform, vowing to support the Police Bureau and take a harder stance on enforcing camping laws."

On Election Day, Arnold received more first-place votes than Eric Zimmerman, but came in 4th after ranked-choice tabulation. Zimmerman assumed office alongside Mitch Green and Olivia Clark.

== 2026 city council campaign ==
In November 2025, Arnold announced that he would run for Portland City Council District 4 once again. He sought to move away from his previous campaign's public safety focus and appeal to more left-leaning voters. This included an emphasis on his support for climate programs and fareless transit.

According to a Portland Mercury article published in October 2026, Arnold "reported using force 59 times since PPB hired him in May 2017." That placed him among the officer with the most uses of force in that period. He reported the greatest number of uses of force of any officer in 2021. "Arnold disproportionately used force against homeless Portlanders and Black Portlanders."

== Other political activity ==
In 2025, Arnold founded the non-profit Partnership for Progress together with Vadim Mozyrsky. The organization has "pushed against policies brought by progressive councilors, advocated for homeless camp sweeps, spoken out against the Preschool For All tax on high-income earners, and advocated for increased funding for police." Partnership for Progress was the largest contributor to Go Portland Go, which endorsed Arnold's 2026 campaign.
