= Mitch Green (politician) =

American economist and politician

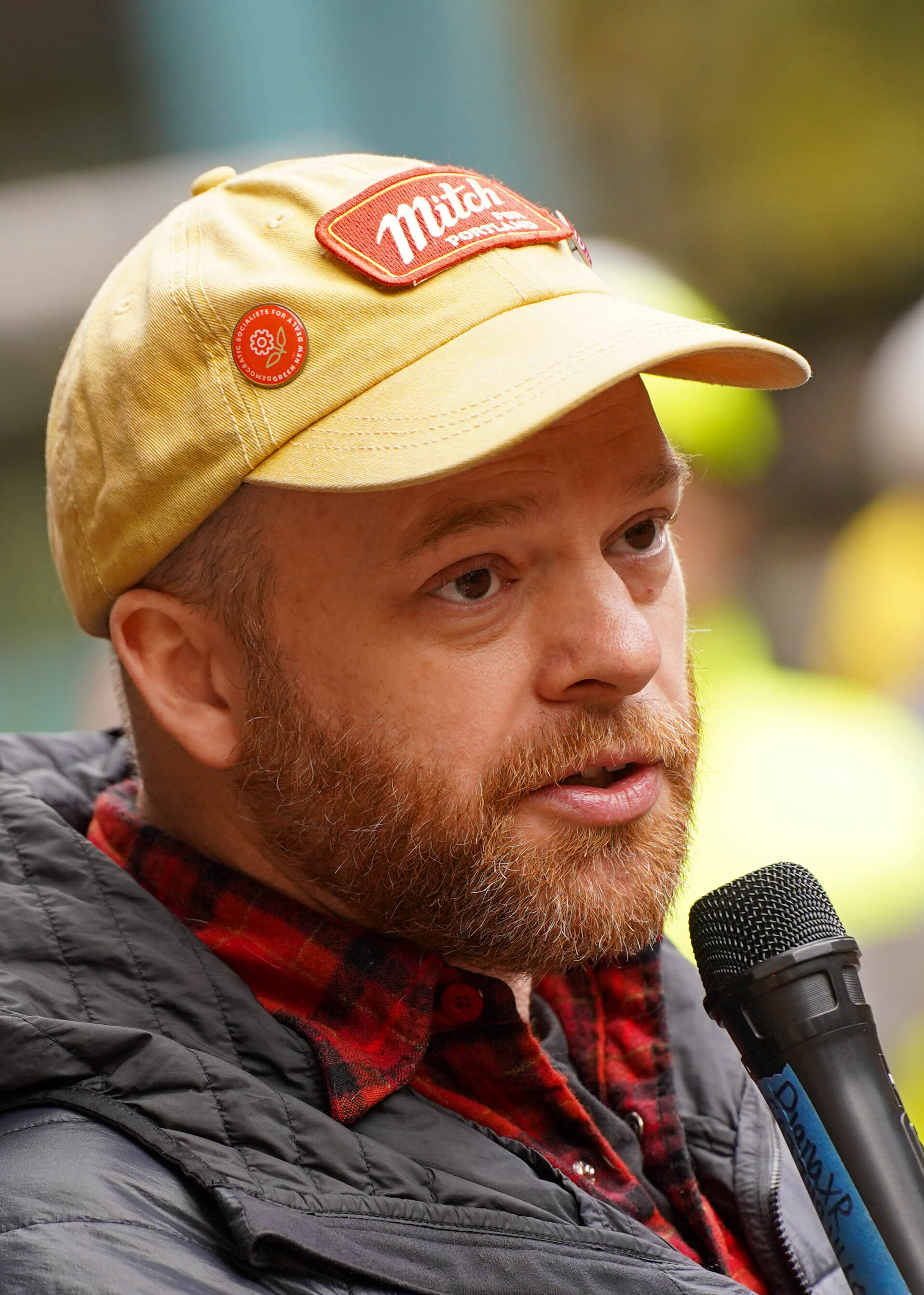
- Green in 2024

Member of the Portland City Council from District 4
- Incumbent
- Assumed office January 1, 2025 Serving with Olivia Clark and Eric Zimmerman
- Preceded by: office established

Personal details
- Born: 1982 (age 43–44)
- Party: Democratic
- Education: Portland State University; University of Missouri-Kansas City

Mitch Green is an economist who was elected to Portland City Council in 2024, representing District 4. Green is one of the twelve inaugural members of Portland's new expanded city council after switching from a city commission government to a mayor–council government. Green is running for re-election in 2026 and had received more than $162,000 from Portland's Small Donor Election program by September because of contributions by more than 1,600 Portland residents.

== Early life ==
Green grew up in Portland as well as Vancouver, Washington. He was the first member of his family to attend college.

== Career ==
Green spent over a decade as a senior risk analyst specializing in energy economics for the Bonneville Power Administration. Before that, he has spent time as a professor of economics at his alma mater, Portland State University, as well as Franklin & Marshall College in Lancaster, Pennsylvania.

Green has been a member of the Portland chapter of the Democratic Socialists of America since 2018, and was endorsed by the chapter in the 2024 and 2026 City Council elections. He says he joined because, "I saw DSA was out in the streets, showing up at the things I cared a lot about.”

=== Portland City Council ===
In January 2025, Green developed and cosponsored a resolution that was adopted by Portland City Council which directed city staff and the mayor to investigate Zenith Energy's land use review for development in the Willamette River's protected areas. The subsequent investigation found no violations of state or federal laws or city codes by Zenith.

In April 2025, Green introduced a resolution with Councilor Loretta Smith that directed the Portland Bureau of Transportation to research and propose new ways to add and improve sidewalks in treacherous areas in Portland's districts 1 and 4 (the most eastern and western parts of the city, respectively). The proposal passed 11-1.

Also in April 2025, Green introduced a resolution with Councilor Candace Avalos that directed the city administrator to study social housing and submit a report on the housing model to the council by the end of March of the next year. Green said, "This resolution finally puts Portland on a path to address the root causes of housing unaffordability and homelessness [...] Portland is in a housing crisis that demands bold solutions and systems change. We have been responding as a reaction to the scarcity of affordable housing in this city for a long time. The intention of this resolution is to empower the Portland Housing Bureau to unlock its expertise and have the explicit direction to go out and study new ways of doing housing production, in particular social housing." The resolution was passed unanimously by the council. Green, along with Councilor Avalos and Councilor Jamie Dunphy, took a trip to Vienna, Austria in September 2025 to learn about the impact of social housing in the city from experts, residents, and government officials.

During the 2025 city budget cycle, Green proposed an amendment that set aside $2.2 million dollars of unspent police funds to be used by all public safety bureaus, including police, with council approval. Green characterized his amendment as creating additional funding for all types of public safety services the city offers, saying it is an "opportunity for more than just police to come to the table." The amendment was incorporated into the budget after an 11-1 vote.

In August 2025, Green helped coordinate the relocation of The Cottonwood School of Civics and Science in Southwest Portland which was located near the Portland United States Immigration and Customs Enforcement facility, the epicenter of escalated protests in summer 2025. Chemical gases and other munitions had impacted the school and its students at the end of the school year, and within a month and half, Green's office helped facilitate collaboration between city departments, multiple schools, and volunteers that allowed the school to fully relocate before students returned in the fall. Green himself assisted with setting up the school. In November 2025, Green and Councilor Angelita Morillo introduced a land use fee targeting the impact ICE detention facilities had had on the city of Portland, which passed in a 9-2 vote.

In October 2025, Green introduced a successful amendment to Councilor Loretta Smith's resolution asking the city administrator to commission studies into racial and gendered disparities in contracting and workforce participation. Green's amendment, alongside another introduced by Councilor Dan Ryan, ensured that the studies would specifically gather data related to whether the Regional Workforce Equity Agreement had been effective. This agreement commits regional governments near Portland to use union, and by extension a greater number of female and minority, workers on public construction projects, and was perceived as under threat by President Donald Trump's 2025 executive order pledging to end all race- and sex-based preferences.

In December 2025, Green filed a resolution requesting the City Council use its oversight authority to investigate $21 million of Housing Bureau funds that had gone unspent and unreported during the budget process. The resolution passed and required the city administrator to release public records related to the discrepancy. Subsequently, additional funds were discovered and the total of unspent funds rose to $106 million. In April 2026, Green introduced a policy package called "Keep Portland Housed" which was passed by the City Council as part of a spring budget adjustment. The plan directs city funds towards both short term and long term housing solutions, including emergency rent assistance, eviction defense, and permanent publicly-owned affordable housing. Green said that the package was the first step in bringing social housing to Portland, saying "Starting today, the City of Portland will begin to acquire existing properties and convert them into permanently affordable, off-market housing. We also created a revolving loan fund that can support future social housing development. This is only the beginning. We have a lot more work ahead of us. But make no mistake, social housing in Portland has begun."

During the 2026 city budget cycle, Green proposed a "chop from the top" strategy that would eliminate 20% of administrative positions, primarily senior management, in the city government to save money, programs, and lower level city jobs that were primarily union represented. The budget that was ultimately adopted eliminated 140 city jobs across city bureaus, including 42 non-police public safety specialist positions that Green's plan sought to maintain. Green remained committed to saving these city jobs and worked with four other progressive block councilors to reintroduce the failed budget amendment as an ordinance. On July 22, 2026, the "Save Our Services" ordinance introduced by the progressive block councilors failed, but an alternative ordinance dubbed "Risk Reduction" that restored 30 of the eliminated public safety jobs as well as some funding for police training was passed by the City Council 10-2.

== Personal life ==
While he was a student at Portland State University Green purchased a hot dog cart on Ebay for $1,200, but hit roadblocks in opening a business which he planned to call "Green Weenies." He credits this early experience for his enthusiasm for removing bureaucratic barriers faced by small businesses.

Green is married.

In August 2026, Portland Fire and Rescue responded to a call about debris being burned in the backyard of Green's Southwest Portland home. Green was found to be burning a brush pile in his own backyard, flouting the debris burn ban that was in force.

In September 2026, Posts made in 2020 and 2021 from Green's X/Twitter account which was deleted in 2022, were resurfaced. Green's comments were made in response to police violence towards protestors at the George Floyd protests in Portland, Green professed his "pure hatred for the Portland police," defended and promoted rioting, and mocked business owners seeking help from the city. In response to reporting about the tweets, Green said, "I would not characterize the police today that way [...] I know some police officers now because I’m a city councilor. I have met some police officers who I think genuinely care about our city. [...] I do want a world where we abolish the police, that’s what I’m actively trying to build." The Portland Police Association, the union representing officers at Portland Police Bureau called for Green's resignation in response to his comments.

== See also ==
- List of people from Portland, Oregon
