= Jamie Dunphy =

American politician

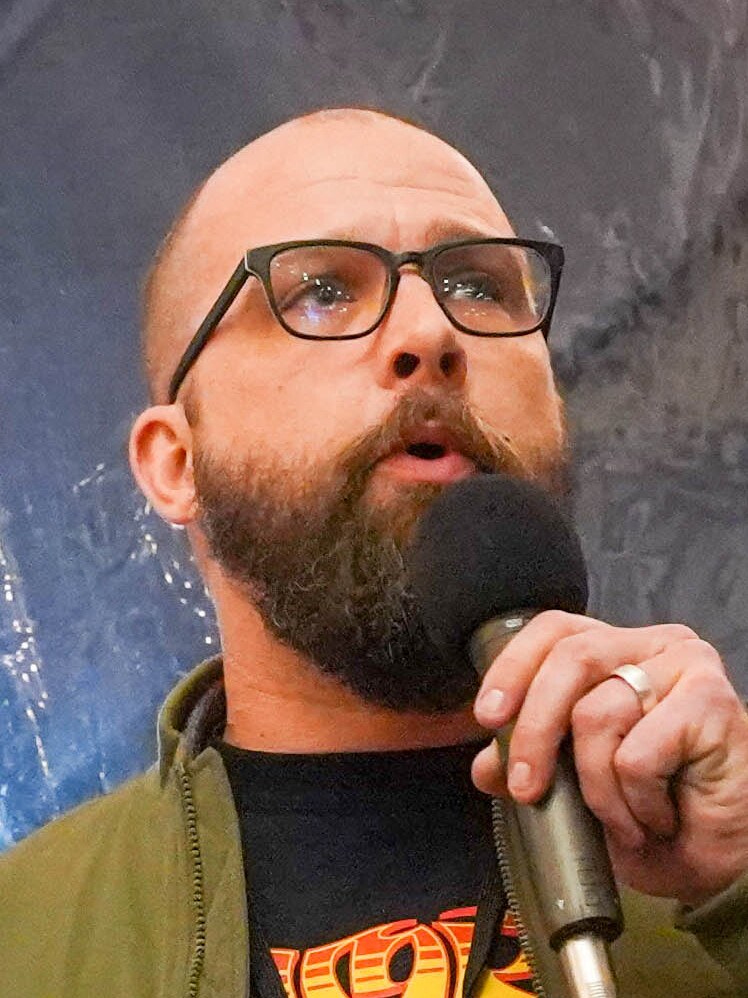
- Dunphy in 2024

President of the Portland City Council
- Incumbent
- Assumed office January 14, 2026
- Vice President: Olivia Clark
- Preceded by: Elana Pirtle-Guiney

Member of the Portland City Council from District 1
- Incumbent
- Assumed office January 1, 2025 Serving with Candace Avalos and Loretta Smith
- Preceded by: office established

Personal details
- Born: 1984 or 1985 (age 41–42)
- Party: Democratic
- Education: Grant High School; Portland State University (B.S.)

Jamie Dunphy is a policy director who was elected to Portland City Council in 2024 in District 1, along with Candace Avalos and Loretta Smith. Dunphy is one of the twelve inaugural members of Portland's new expanded city council after switching from a city commission government to a mayor–council government. Due to the close nature of his race, Dunphy (along with Eric Zimmerman from District 4) was one of the last two confirmed winners of the election.

On January 14, 2026, Dunphy was elected president of the Portland City Council.

== Education ==
Dunphy graduated from Grant High School. He attended Portland Community College before earning a Bachelor of Science degree in political science from Portland State University.

== Career ==
Dunphy has worked in policy and government relations with former Portland City Commissioner Nick Fish, US Senator Jeff Merkley (D-Oregon), and the American Cancer Society Cancer Action Network.

On January 14, 2026, Dunphy was elected president of the Portland City Council as a compromise candidate following 13 rounds of voting. Dunphy had not sought the position and previously called it "the worst job in politics", but stated he was willing to serve if it was "the only way out of an entrenched 6-6 stalemate" during the final round of voting.

== Personal life ==
Dunphy lives in Portland's Parkrose neighborhood. He has two Nubian goats called Chidi and Eleanor.

== See also ==
- List of Portland State University alumni
