= Eric Zimmerman (politician) =

American politician

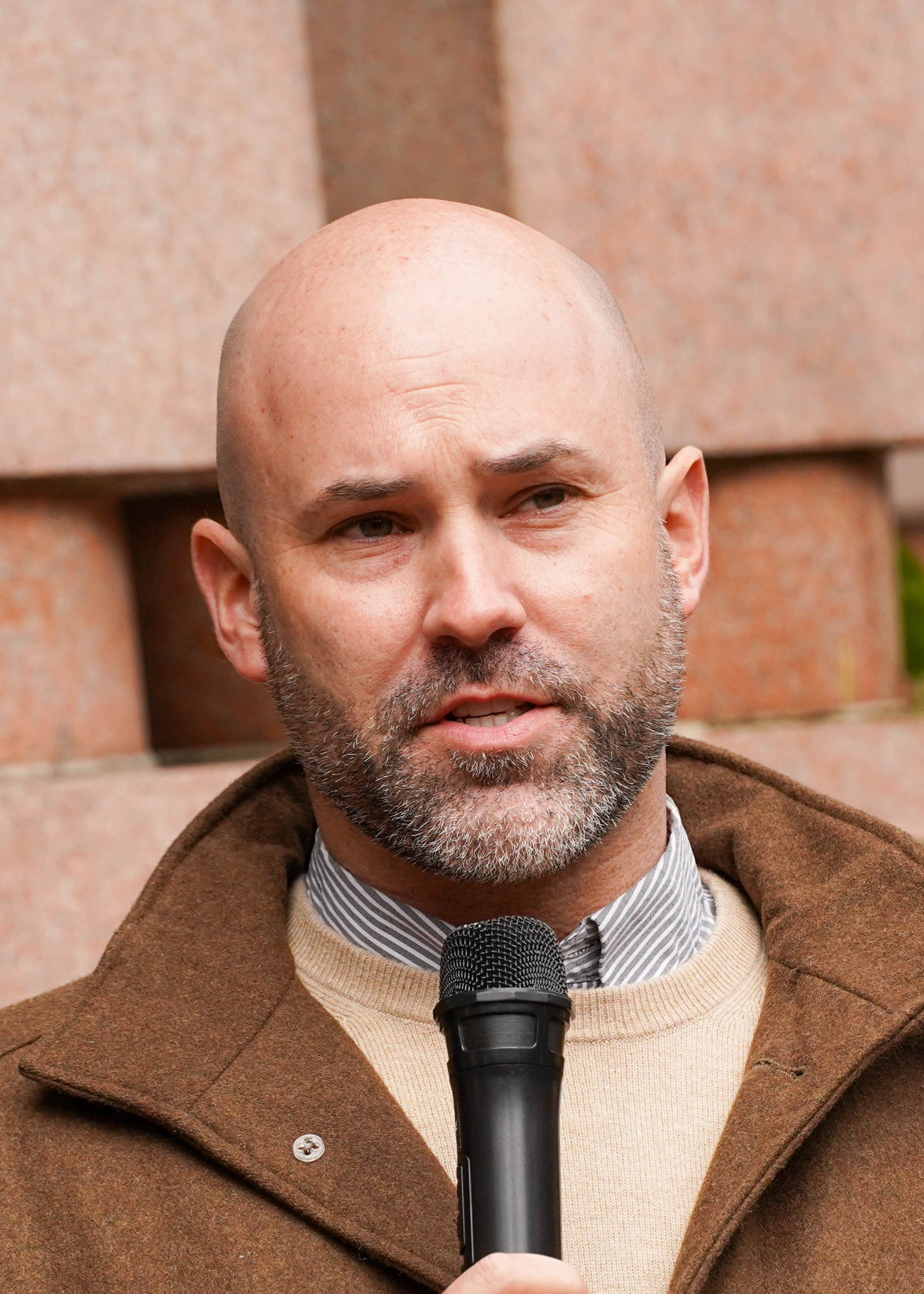
- Zimmerman in 2024

Member of the Portland City Council from District 4
- Incumbent
- Assumed office January 1, 2025 Serving with Mitch Green and Olivia Clark
- Preceded by: office established

Personal details
- Party: Democratic
- Education: University of Portland (B.S., M.B.A.)
- Military career
- Allegiance: United States
- Branch: United States Army: Oregon Army National Guard
- Service years: 2003–present
- Rank: Lieutenant Colonel
- Unit: 41st Infantry Brigade
- Conflicts: Iraq War: Operation Iraqi Freedom

Eric Zimmerman is an American politician who was elected to Portland City Council in 2024 in District 4, along with Olivia Clark and Mitch Green. Zimmerman is one of the twelve inaugural members of Portland's new expanded city council after switching from a city commission government to a mayor–council government. Due to the close nature of his race, Zimmerman (along with Jamie Dunphy from District 1) was one of the last two confirmed winners of the election.

== Early life ==
Zimmerman was born in Portland, Oregon, and raised in the metropolitan area. He attended the University of Portland. He earned a Bachelor of Science degree and a Master of Business Administration degree.

== Career ==
Zimmerman has been the chief of staff to Multnomah County Commissioner Julia Brim-Edwards. He is also a U.S. Army veteran who served in Iraq. He has also served in the Oregon Army National Guard.

== Personal life ==
Zimmerman is gay.

== See also ==
- List of LGBTQ politicians in the United States
- List of people from Portland, Oregon
  - List of LGBTQ people from Portland, Oregon
- List of University of Portland alumni
