= Olivia Clark (politician) =

American politician

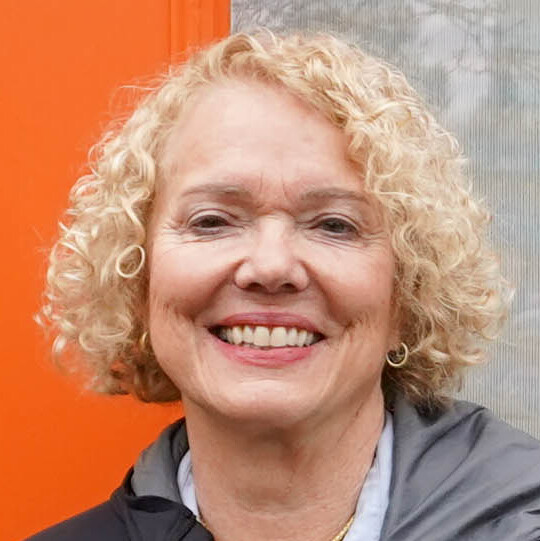
- Clark in 2024

Vice President of the Portland City Council
- Incumbent
- Assumed office January 14, 2026
- President: Jamie Dunphy
- Preceded by: Tiffany Koyama Lane

Member of the Portland City Council from District 4
- Incumbent
- Assumed office January 1, 2025 Serving with Mitch Green and Eric Zimmerman
- Preceded by: office established

Personal details
- Party: Democratic
- Education: University of Redlands (B.A.); University of Oregon (M.A.)

Olivia Clark is a retired policy director who was elected to Portland City Council from District 4 in 2024, along with Mitch Green and Eric Zimmerman. Clark is one of the twelve inaugural members of Portland's new expanded city council after switching from a city commission government to a mayor–council government.

== Early life and education ==
Clark was raised in California. She earned a Bachelor of Arts degree in sociology from the University of Redlands and a Masters of Arts degree in the same field from the University of Oregon.

== Career ==
Clark was a legislative director for Governor John Kitzhaber and has worked for TriMet.

Clark ran for Portland City Council in the newly formed District 4. She was the only candidate in any district to pass the 25% threshold for election in the first round of voting.

On January 2, 2025, Clark ran for president of the new City Council, but upon failing to win a majority of votes, she withdrew her candidacy, throwing her support behind eventual winner Elana Pirtle-Guiney, who was nominated after a deadlocked vote as a compromise candidate. She was elected vice president for the following council term on January 14, 2026.

== See also ==
- List of people from Portland, Oregon
- List of University of Oregon alumni
