= Candace Avalos =

American nonprofit executive and politician

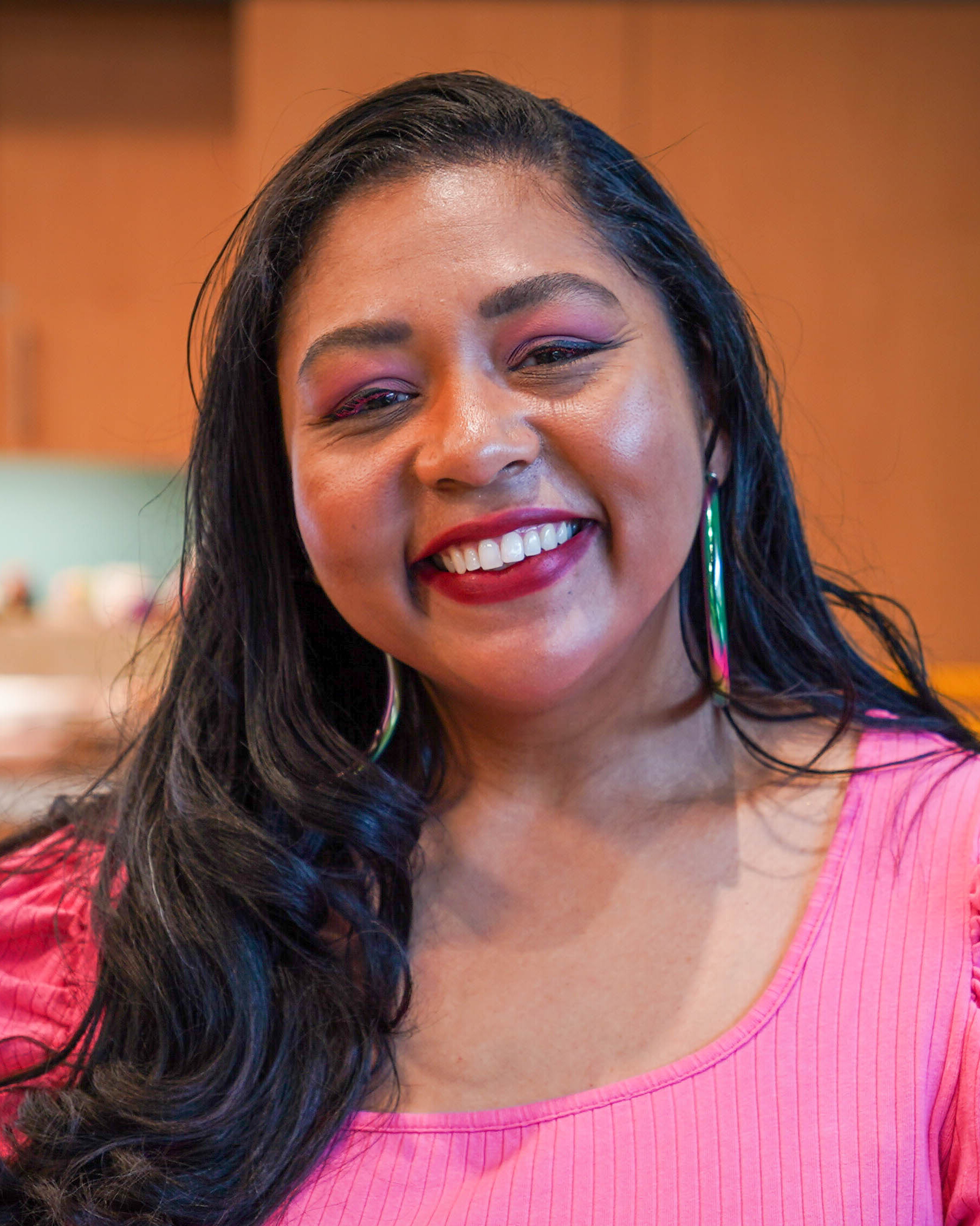
- Avalos in 2025

Member of the Portland City Council from District 1
- Incumbent
- Assumed office January 1, 2025 Serving with Loretta Smith and Jamie Dunphy
- Preceded by: office established

Personal details
- Party: Democratic
- Education: James Madison University (BA, MEd)

Candace Avalos is an American nonprofit executive and politician who is a member of Portland City Council from District 1 after being elected along with Loretta Smith and Jamie Dunphy in the 2024 election. Avalos is one of the twelve inaugural members of Portland's new expanded city council after switching from a city commission government to a mayor–council government.

== Early life and education ==
Avalos was born to African American and Guatemalan parents and identifies as "Blacktina." Avalos earned her Master's degree in education from James Madison University.

== Career ==
Avalos was the executive director of the environmental nonprofit organization Verde prior to joining city council, and is a co-founder of the Black Millennial Movement.

=== Portland City Council ===
Avalos initially ran for the Portland City Commission in the 2020 election, announcing her run in August 2019. She was defeated by Carmen Rubio in the primary, receiving only 8.9 percent of the vote compared to Rubio's 67.6 percent.

In September 2023, Avalos announced her run for the newly expanded city council in the 2024 election, running in District 1, which represents East Portland. Avalos was endorsed by former Governor Kate Brown, Multnomah County Chair Jessica Vega Pederson, and the Service Employees International Union, along with her former opponent Rubio. Avalos led the race in the initial round, receiving 19 percent of the first place vote against 16 other candidates. Local news agencies quickly called the race for Avalos.

On January 2, 2025, Avalos ran for the presidency of the new City Council, but was defeated by Elana Pirtle-Guiney after ten rounds of voting.

== Personal life ==
Avalos lives in Mill Park.

== See also ==
- List of James Madison University alumni
- List of people from Portland, Oregon
