= Parkrose, Portland, Oregon =

Parkrose
- Neighborhood
- Location in Portland
- Coordinates: 45°33′26″N 122°32′51″WPDF map
- Country: United States
- State: Oregon
- City: Portland

Government
  - Association: Parkrose Neighborhood Association
  - Coalition: East Portland Neighborhood Office

Area
  - Total: 1.85 sq mi (4.80 km^{2})

Population (2000)
  - Total: 6,049
  - Density: 3,260/sq mi (1,260/km^{2})

Housing
  - No. of households: 2095
  - Occupancy rate: 93% occupied
  - Owner-occupied: 1030 households (49%)
  - Renting: 1065 households (51%)
  - Avg. household size: 2.89 persons

Parkrose is a neighborhood in the Northeast section of Portland, Oregon. It is bordered by Sumner to the west, the Columbia River to the north, Argay to the east, and Parkrose Heights and the city of Maywood Park to the south. Sandy Boulevard crosses the neighborhood, with a primarily industrial area prevailing to the north and primarily residential area to the south.

There is a Parkrose/Sumner Transit Center, which is served by the Red Line of TriMet's MAX Light Rail. A bridge at the transit center spans Interstate 205. C-Tran serves the transit center and travels into Washington. There is also a Parkrose School District.

== History ==
The Parkrose plat was filed October 5, 1911. A branch post office of Portland was established there in 1921.

Parkrose was a small farming and residential suburb of Portland until the 1920s. The Oregon Journal noted on May 23, 1925, "Parkrose is a primary commuting center... It is one of the most progressive and promising commuting districts on the eastern border of the city."

Parkrose was annexed by Portland, and the community was enumerated as a "Census-designated place" in 1980, when the community recorded a population of 21,108.

Columbia Pioneer Cemetery, established in 1877, exists at NE 99th Avenue and Sandy Boulevard.

A public history project, Parkrose Community Archive, was created by Parkrose alumna Jada Krening in 2024 as a collaborative effort to document the history of Parkrose.

== Community ==
In July 2018, community members painted a street mural in the shape of a compass at the intersections of NE 109th and Skidmore. An annual event, Taste of Parkrose, is held in the summer.

Senn's Dairy Park, at approximately one acre, is the only city park in the neighborhood.

== See also ==
- Portland Immigrant Statue
