= Parkrose Heights, Portland, Oregon =

Parkrose Heights
- Neighborhood
- Location within Portland, Oregon
- Coordinates: 45°32′22″N 122°32′56″W
- Country: United States
- State: Oregon
- City: Portland

Government
  - Association: Parkrose Heights Association of Neighbors
  - Coalition: East Portland Neighborhood Office

Area
  - Total: 0.97 sq mi (2.52 km^{2})

Population (2000)
  - Total: 6,093
  - Density: 6,260/sq mi (2,420/km^{2})

Housing
  - No. of households: 2332
  - Occupancy rate: 95% occupied
  - Owner-occupied: 1453 households (62%)
  - Renting: 879 households (38%)
  - Avg. household size: 2.61 persons

Parkrose Heights is a neighborhood in the Northeast section of Portland, Oregon. It's part of the Parkrose School District and Sacramento Elementary School falls within its boundaries.

Neighborhood parks include Gateway Discovery Park, Knott City Park, and Merrifield Park.

"Basic Earthquake Emergency Communication Nodes" are locations in Portland where people can go to access emergency communications services if telephone service is down after an earthquake, or to report severe damage or injury. Knott City Park is Parkrose Heights's designated Basic Earthquake Emergency Communication Node.

Parkrose Heights is served by TriMet bus lines 23 and 77. The Gateway Transit Center is also nearby.

Parts of the neighborhood falls within the Gateway Business District and Prosper Portland's Gateway Regional Center Urban Renewal Area. The neighborhood is covered by the Argay-Parkrose Neighborhood Emergency Team for earthquake preparedness.

Parkrose Heights is bordered by Woodland Park and Madison South to the west, Maywood Park to the northwest, Parkrose to the north, Argay Terrace to the northeast, Russell to the east, and Hazelwood to the south.
