= Woodland Park, Portland, Oregon =

Woodland Park
- Neighborhood
- Location in Portland
- Coordinates: 45°32′06″N 122°33′36″W
- Country: United States
- State: Oregon
- City: Portland

Government
  - Association: Woodland Park Neighborhood Association
  - Coalition: East Portland Neighborhood Office

Area
  - Total: 0.050 sq mi (0.13 km^{2})

Population (2000)
  - Total: 302
  - Density: 6,000/sq mi (2,300/km^{2})

Housing
  - No. of households: 110
  - Occupancy rate: 97% occupied
  - Owner-occupied: 89 households (81%)
  - Renting: 21 households (19%)
  - Avg. household size: 2.75 persons

Woodland Park is an exclusively residential neighborhood in the Northeast section of Portland, Oregon. It borders Madison South on the west (beyond the I-84 and I-205 freeways), Parkrose Heights on the north and east, and Hazelwood on the south. It is roughly between NE 99th and 102nd, and NE Halsey and NE Tillamook.

Woodland Park has no schools, parks, or businesses. It has the smallest area of Portland's 95 officially recognized neighborhoods.
