= Sumner, Portland, Oregon =

Sumner
- Neighborhood
- Location in Portland
- Coordinates: 45°33′32″N 122°34′44″W
- Country: United States
- State: Oregon
- City: Portland

Government
  - Association: Sumner Association of Neighbors
  - Coalition: Central Northeast Neighbors, Inc.

Area
  - Total: 0.37 sq mi (0.96 km^{2})

Population (1996)
  - Total: 1,932
  - Density: 5,200/sq mi (2,000/km^{2})

Housing
  - No. of households: 876
  - Owner-occupied: 632 households (72%)
  - Renting: 244 households (28%)
- Note: Area and demographic figures are 1996 data from Sumner and from Cully-Sumner overlap area.

Sumner is a neighborhood in the Northeast section of Portland, Oregon, including the portion of the city of Maywood Park west of Interstate 205. The area includes Portland International Airport at its northern extreme but there are no residences surrounding it. Also the area north of Columbia Blvd. is industrial and commercial, though it does contain a few hotels.
