= Argay, Portland, Oregon =

Argay
- Neighborhood
- Interactive map of Argay
- Coordinates: 45°33′17″N 122°31′16″W
- Country: United States
- State: Oregon
- City: Portland

Government
  - Association: Argay Neighborhood Association
  - Coalition: East Portland Neighborhood Office

Area
  - Total: 2.07 sq mi (5.4 km^{2})

Population (2020)
  - Total: 6,285
  - Density: 3,036/sq mi (1,172/km^{2})

Housing
  - No. of households: 2390
  - Occupancy rate: 94.8% occupied
  - Owner-occupied: 1395 households (58%)
  - Renting: 1007 households (42%)
  - Avg. household size: 2.5 persons

Argay, also known as Argay Terrace, is a neighborhood in the Northeast section of Portland, Oregon, United States. Argay is bounded by the Columbia River on the north, NE 122nd Ave on the west, Interstate 84 on the south, and NE 148th Ave on the east.

Originally conceived of by Art Simonson and Gerhardt (Gay) Stavney (the “Ar” and “Gay” of Argay) as a "move-up" suburban family neighborhood alternative to Portland's congested inner-city, Argay Terrace built out as planned with larger homes on large lots spread out over the gently sloping terrain that gave the area an open feeling. It is the largest tract of midcentury development in East Portland, and its homes reflect that style, with mixes of one-story ranches, split-entry, split-level, and some modern two-story colonials.

The neighborhood is the location of Argay Park and Luuwit View Park.

== History & design ==
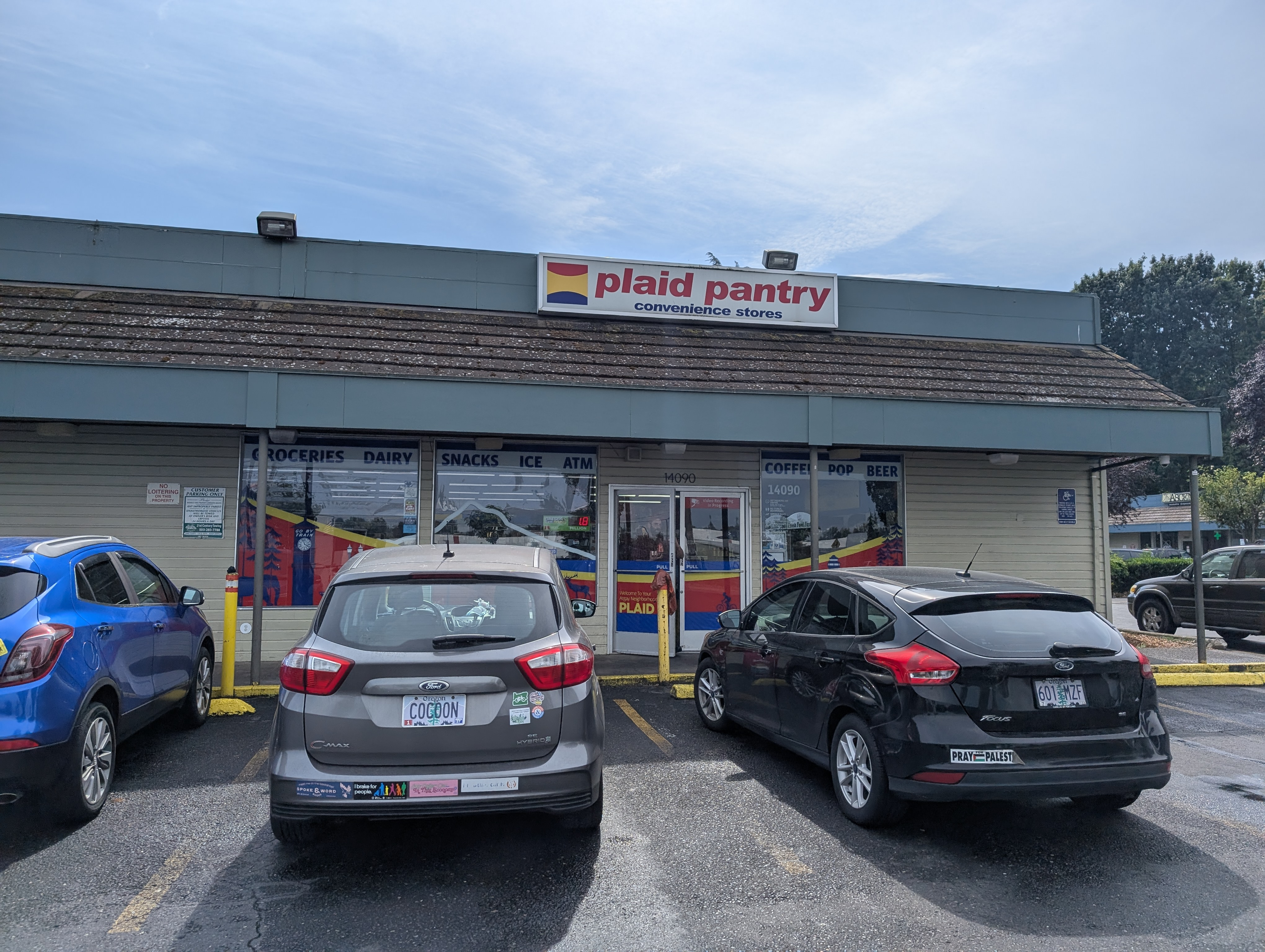
Plaid Pantry store in Argay

Argay was established in 1957 by Art Simonson and Gerhardt (Gay) Stavney and was planned around the peak of the automobile's popularity, which made it so new developments could spread out more. It was planned for larger homes on larger lots, with cul-de-sacs and wide streets that curve into loops. The streets do not directly connect with Portland's street grid and were designed with more limited access to the neighborhood from arterials.

Argay features more condominiums and apartments around the edge of the single-family area of the neighborhood as well as part of an industrial area towards the Columbia River.

== Demographics ==
In 2020, 6,285 people lived in Argay, a 5% increase from 5,997 in 2010, which was a 4% increase from 5,788 in 2000.

In 2020, 57% of people identified as white, 15.2% as Black or African American, 14.3% as Hispanic or Latino, 11.8% as Asian, 3.6% as American Indian or Alaska Native, 1.8% as Native Hawaiian or Pacific Islander, and 12.1% as some other race. 14.3% identified as Hispanic or Latino. The median household income was listed at $62,000 and tree cover was 13%.
