= 2026 Portland, Oregon, City Council election =

2026 Portland City Council elections
- November 3, 2026

6 of the 12 seats in the Portland City Council 7 seats needed for a majority
Party	Moderates (Note: City council races in Portland are formally nonpartisan, but moderate and progressive caucuses have formed.)	Peacock (Note: City council races in Portland are formally nonpartisan. "Peacock" stands for P-cauc, or progressive caucus, which includes both DSA and Progressive.)
Current seats	6	6
Seats needed	▲1	▲1
Seats up	3	3
Incumbent President of the Council
Jamie Dunphy
Moderates

The 2026 Portland, Oregon City Council elections were held on November 3, 2026, to elect 6 members of the Portland City Council. This was the second election under the new city council form of government adopted following Portland's 2022 charter reform and the second to use ranked-choice voting.

In the previous election, all 12 members of the new city council were elected for the first time. Council members in District 1 and District 2 were elected to 4-year terms, while members in District 3 and District 4 were elected to 2-year terms, expiring at the end of 2026. All members elected in 2026 will serve 4-year terms, creating a staggered schedule where half of the city council is up for election every 2 years.

== District 3 ==
District 3 represents most of Southeast Portland south of Interstate 84 and west of Interstate 205, as well as a small sliver of Northeast Portland east of 47th Avenue and south of Prescott Avenue. Neighborhoods represented include Brentwood-Darlington, Brooklyn, Buckman, Creston-Kenilworth, Foster-Powell, Hosford-Abernethy (includes Ladd's Addition), Kerns, Laurelhurst, Madison South, Montavilla, Mt. Scott-Arleta, Mt. Tabor, North Tabor, Richmond, Rose City Park, Roseway, South Tabor, Sunnyside, and Woodstock.

=== Candidates ===
==== Certified ====
- Tiffany Koyama Lane, incumbent city councilor
- Angelita Morillo, incumbent city councilor
- Tom Sollitt, community organizer and creative strategist
- Steve Novick, incumbent city councilor
- Esther Leon
- Kellie Torres

==== Filed paperwork but did not certify ====
- Kimberly Tucker, Behavioral Analyst
- Michael Johnson, environmental services administrator
- Tyler Frederick, financial analyst
- Nicole Tignor Zimmerman, business leader, community leader
- Joel Corcoran
- Matthias Hallett
- Dallas Brown
- Patrick Hilton
- Ali Beaudoin, Professor

Disqualified

- Brandon Mullen, leadership consultant

== District 4 ==
District 4 represents all of Portland west of the Willamette River (its Northwest, Southwest, and South sextants) as well as the Eastmoreland, Reed, and Sellwood-Moreland neighborhoods in southeast Portland. Neighborhoods represented include Arlington Heights, Arnold Creek, Ashcreek, Bridlemile (includes Glencullen), Collins View, Crestwood, Downtown, Eastmoreland, Far Southwest, Forest Park, Goose Hollow, Hayhurst (includes Vermont Hills), Hillsdale, Hillside, Homestead, Linnton, Maplewood, Markham, Marshall Park, Multnomah (includes Multnomah Village), Northwest District (includes Uptown, Nob Hill, Alphabet Historic District), Northwest Heights, Northwest Industrial, Old Town Chinatown, Pearl District, Reed, Sellwood-Moreland, South Burlingame, South Portland (includes Corbett, Fulton, Lair Hill, Terwilliger, and the Johns Landing and South Waterfront developments), Southwest Hills, Sylvan-Highlands, and West Portland Park (includes Capitol Hill).

=== Candidates ===
==== Certified ====
- Olivia Clark, incumbent city councilor
- Eric Zimmerman, incumbent city councilor
- Mitch Green, incumbent city councilor
- Jeremy Beausoleil Smith, Portland State University Capital Projects Manager, 2024 city council candidate
- Eli Arnold, Portland Police officer, 2024 city council candidate
- Jamey Evenstar, City Hall staffer
- Jayne Cronlund

==== Filed paperwork but did not certify ====
- TJ Anderson, disability student advocate
- John Goldsmith
- Ciatta Thompson, hospitality office manager
