= Portland City Council (Oregon) =

Legislative body in Portland, Oregon, US

Type
- Type: Unicameral

Leadership
- President of the Council: Jamie Dunphy since January 14, 2026
- Vice President of the Council: Olivia Clark since January 14, 2026

Structure
- Seats: 12
- Political groups: Officially nonpartisan, all city councilors are registered Democrats Majority: Peacock (Democratic Socialists of America) (4); Peacock (Progressive) (2); Minority: Moderates (6)
- Length of term: 4 years
- Salary: $133,207

Elections
- Voting system: Single transferable vote
- Last election: November 5, 2024
- Next election: November 3, 2026 (6 seats)

Meeting place
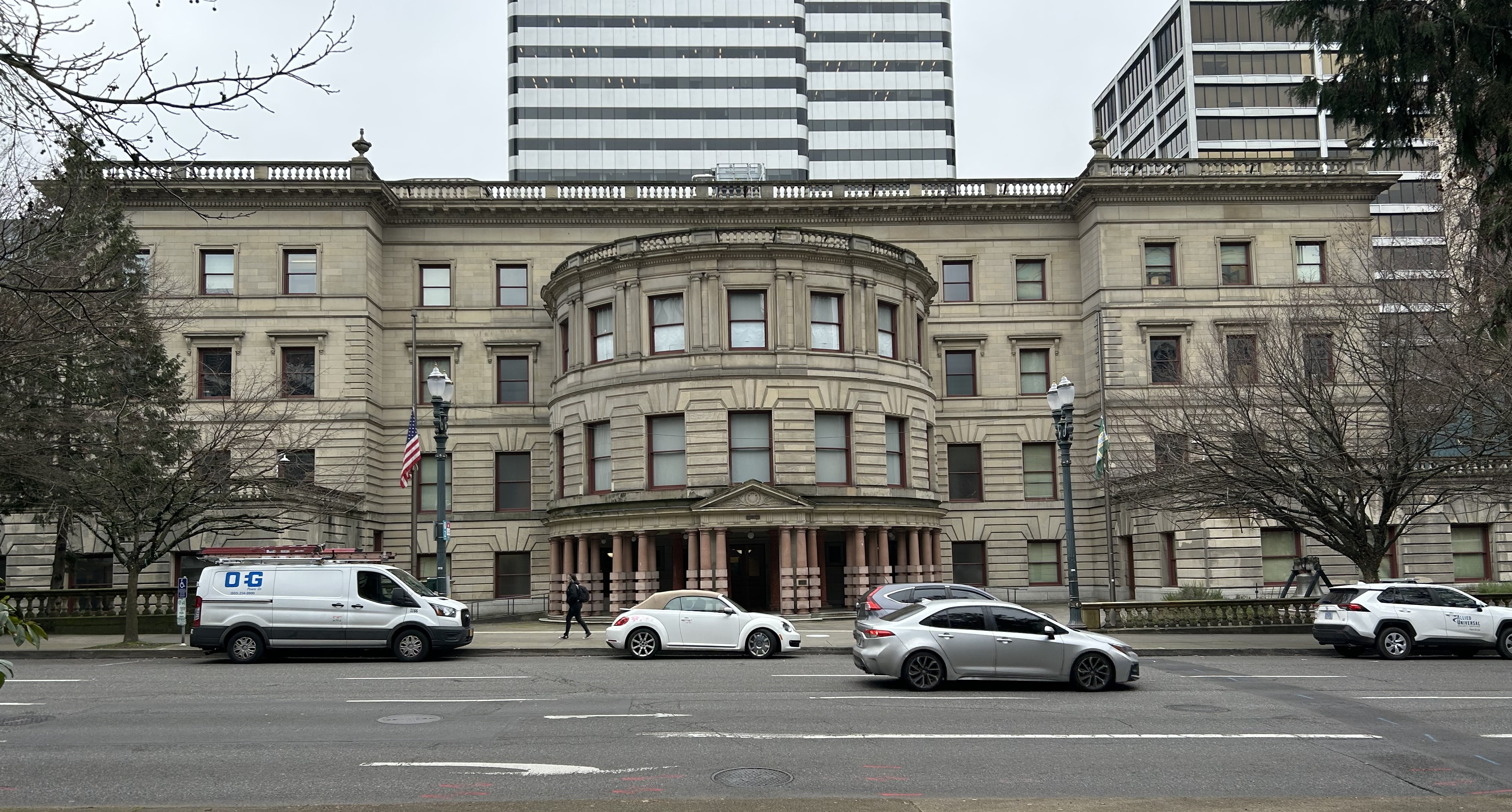
- Portland City Hall; Portland, Oregon

Website
- Portland City Council

The Portland City Council (formerly the Portland City Commission) is the legislative body of the City of Portland in Oregon and forms part of the government of the city.

In January 2025, the city of Portland switched to a mayor–council form of government from a commission form of government, with elections held the prior November. Half of the city council began full four-year terms, while the other half started initial two-year terms to establish a staggered election cycle.

There are no term-limits for city councilors and they are all officially nonpartisan, although all current members of the council are members of the Democratic Party, and four of the councilors are members of the Democratic Socialists of America (DSA). Six councilors, including the four DSA members, are part of a progressive caucus dubbed Peacock (derived from "progressive caucus", or "p-cauc"), splitting the council into two equal caucuses.

== Members ==
Note: all current members of Portland City Council are registered Democrats. Their political group indicated below refers to their caucus membership.

District	Name	Political group	Elected
1	Candace Avalos	Peacock (Progressive)	2024
1	Loretta Smith	Moderate	2024
1	Jamie Dunphy	Peacock (Progressive)	2024
2	Dan Ryan	Moderate	2020
2	Elana Pirtle-Guiney	Moderate	2024
2	Sameer Kanal	Peacock (Democratic Socialist)	2024
3	Steve Novick	Moderate	2024
3	Tiffany Koyama Lane	Peacock (Democratic Socialist)	2024
3	Angelita Morillo	Peacock (Democratic Socialist)	2024
4	Olivia Clark	Moderate	2024
4	Mitch Green	Peacock (Democratic Socialist)	2024
4	Eric Zimmerman	Moderate	2024

== Districts ==
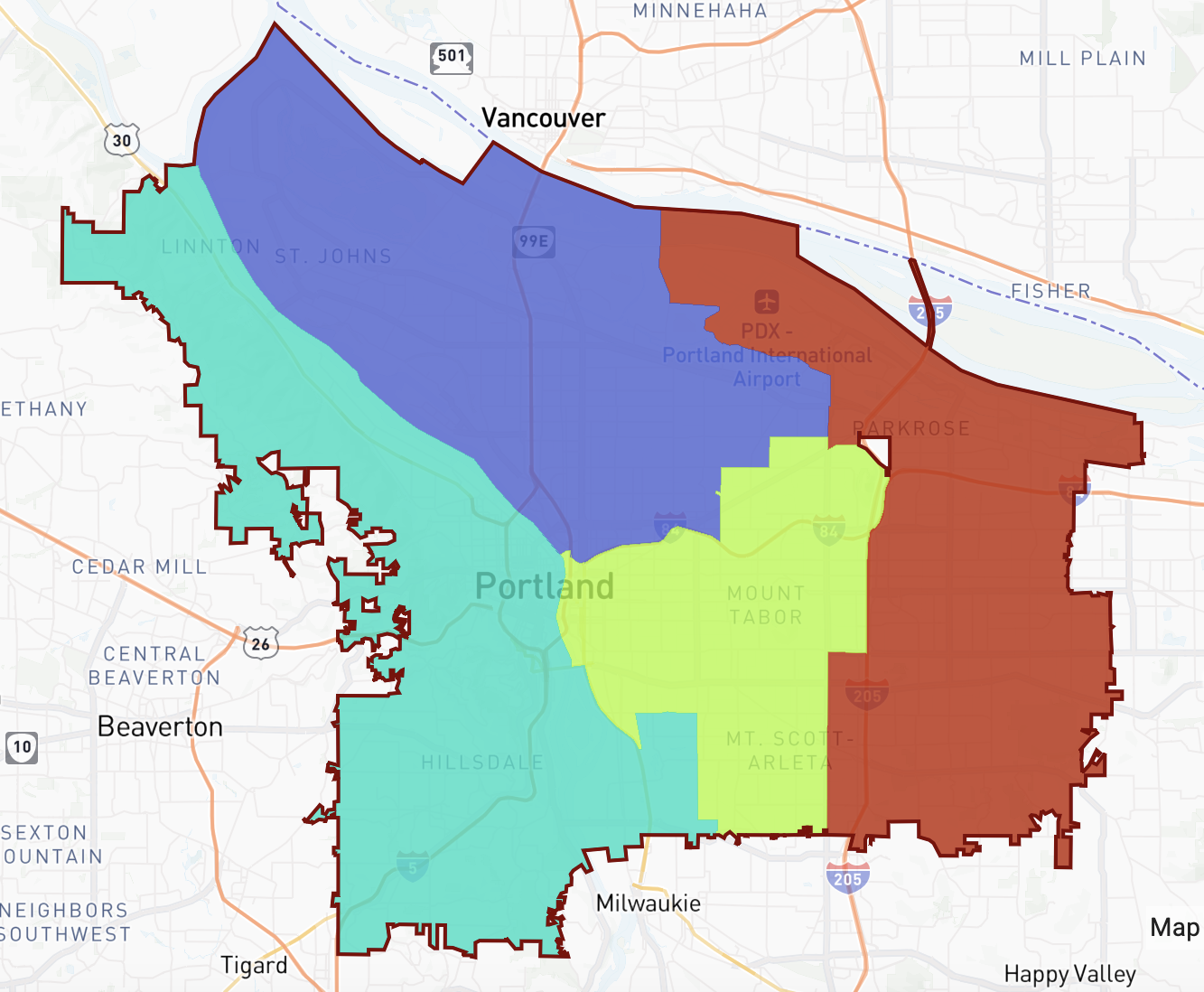
Map of Portland City Council districts as of the new council in 2025.

Since 2024, the council districts are as follows:

District	Geography and neighborhoods
1	The eastern part of the city, primarily everything east of Interstate 205 all the way to the city's eastern border with Gresham, as well as Portland International Airport. Neighborhoods: Argay, Centennial, Glenfair, Hazelwood, Lents, Mill Park, Parkrose, Parkrose Heights, Pleasant Valley, Powellhurst-Gilbert, Russell, Sumner, Wilkes, and Woodland Park.
2	Most of North and Northeast Portland north of Interstate 84 and west of 82nd Avenue. Neighborhoods: Alameda, Arbor Lodge, Beaumont-Wilshire, Boise, Bridgeton, Cathedral Park, Concordia, Cully, Dignity Village, East Columbia, Eliot, Grant Park, Hayden Island, Hollywood, Humboldt, Irvington, Kenton, King, Lloyd District, Madison South, Overlook, Piedmont, Portsmouth, Sabin, St. Johns, Sullivan's Gulch, Sumner, Sunderland, University Park, Vernon, and Woodlawn.
3	Most of Southeast Portland south of Interstate 84 and west of Interstate 205, as well as a small sliver of Northeast Portland east of 47th Avenue and south of Prescott Avenue. Neighborhoods: Brentwood-Darlington, Brooklyn, Buckman, Creston-Kenilworth, Foster-Powell, Hosford-Abernethy (includes Ladd's Addition), Kerns, Laurelhurst, Madison South, Montavilla, Mt. Scott-Arleta, Mt. Tabor, North Tabor, Richmond, Rose City Park, Roseway, South Tabor, Sunnyside, and Woodstock.
4	All of Portland west of the Willamette River (Northwest, Southwest, and South sextants) as well as a small area on the east side including three neighborhoods. Neighborhoods: Arlington Heights, Arnold Creek, Ashcreek, Bridlemile (includes Glencullen), Collins View, Crestwood, Downtown, Eastmoreland, Far Southwest, Forest Park, Goose Hollow, Hayhurst (includes Vermont Hills), Hillsdale, Hillside, Homestead, Linnton, Maplewood, Markham, Marshall Park, Multnomah (includes Multnomah Village), Northwest District (includes Uptown, Nob Hill, Alphabet Historic District), Northwest Heights, Northwest Industrial, Old Town Chinatown, Pearl District, Reed, Sellwood-Moreland, South Burlingame, South Portland (includes Corbett, Fulton, Lair Hill, Terwilliger, and the Johns Landing and South Waterfront developments), Southwest Hills, Sylvan-Highlands, and West Portland Park (includes Capitol Hill).

== History ==
The Portland Charter was the subject of much debate circa 1911–1912. Rival charters were drafted by four different groups. One of these proposed charters was unusual in that it would have used Bucklin voting to elect the mayor and implemented interactive representation of the people through the commissioner system; each commissioner's vote would have been weighted according to the number of votes he received in the election. eventually, the city council submitted an entirely different charter to the people, which was accepted. The city commission government form then came into use in 1913, with H. Russell Albee being the first mayor under the new system.

Between 1913 and 2024, Portland ran on this commission form of government, the largest city in the United States to do so. The council was composed of five members, referred to as Commissioners, which included the Mayor, each elected at-large for a term of four years. One of the Commissioners was elected to be the ceremonial President of the Council.

Commissioners were each assigned to run and oversee various city Bureaus (eg. Police, Fire, Environmental Services, Water). These assignments were occasionally switched around with the exception of the Police Bureau of which the Mayor had always been Commissioner of based on tradition.

=== 2022 Charter Reform ===
Ballot Measure 26-228 in the November 2022 election was an amendment to the city charter that moved the city away from a commission system of government. It replaced the five-person board that included the mayor with a twelve-person board plus a separate mayor. The new city councilors are elected using proportional multi-winner ranked-choice voting, with three members being elected each from four districts, instead of the standard first-past-the-post method. It also removed responsibility for direct management of city bureaus from commissioners to a city manager overseen by the mayor and confirmed by the council. Previous attempts to reform the city charter had been defeated seven times since 1913, including as recently as 2007. Portland became the most-populated city to adopt the single transferable vote to elect city council members.

The first city council elections under the new districts occurred in 2024. In preparation for transitioning management of city bureaus to a city manager, Mayor Ted Wheeler grouped city bureaus into five related service areas.

Portland had officially transitioned to a mayor-council system on January 1, 2025, and held its first meeting on the 2nd. At the first meeting of the new council, Elana Pirtle-Guiney was elected council president in a 7-to-5 vote after 10 rounds and Tiffany Koyama Lane was elected vice president unanimously.

=== 2024–present ===
After the 2024 election created the expanded city council, the council was informally separated into two factions, the moderates, and the progressive caucus which refers to itself as "Peacock." Since 2025, the factions have six members each. After a contentious nine-round vote on January 2, 2025, Elana Pirtle-Guiney, a member of the moderate faction, was elected council president in a 7-5 vote, with Peacock member Mitch Green switching his vote in the final round. Pirtle-Guiney was not an initial candidate for the role. Tiffany Koyama Lane was unanimously elected as the council's vice president.

On January 14, 2026, Jamie Dunphy was elected president for the year in a 9-3 vote after a tense 10 hour debate spanning three council meetings. Like last year, Dunphy was not an initial candidate for the role, but was selected as a compromise candidate. Olivia Clark was elected vice president in an 11-1 vote, with Loretta Smith voting against Clark.

== Presidents ==
No.	Portrait	Officeholder	Political group	Tenure start	Tenure end	Vice President	Mayor
1		Elana Pirtle-Guiney (2nd–Vernon)	Moderate	January 2, 2025	January 14, 2026	Tiffany Koyama Lane (Peacock/DSA)	Keith Wilson
2		Jamie Dunphy (1st–Parkrose)	Peacock (Progressive)	January 14, 2026	Incumbent	Olivia Clark (Moderate)	Keith Wilson

== See also ==
- Government of Portland, Oregon
- Mayor of Portland, Oregon
- History of Portland, Oregon
- City commission government
