= Portland's 4th City Council district (Oregon) =

City electoral district in Oregon, US

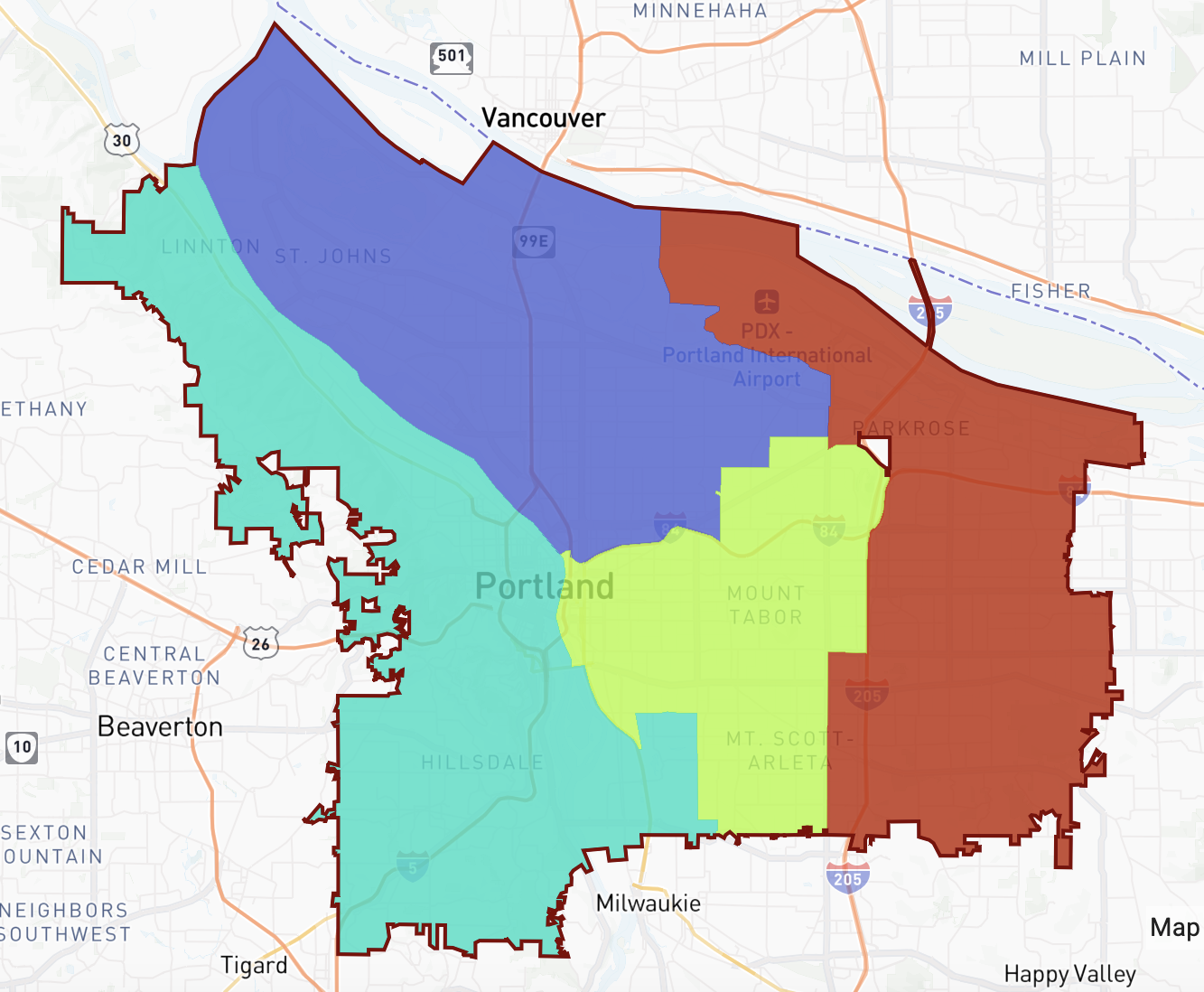
- The four districts electing members to Portland City Council. District 4 is shown in teal.

Government
  - Type: Mayor-council government
  - Body: Portland City Council (Oregon)

Population (2023)
  - Total: 164,647

Demographics
  - White: 74.8%
  - Hispanic: 7.4%
  - Asian: 6.6%
  - Black: 2.6%
  - American Indian: 0.6%
  - Native Hawaiian & Pacific Islander: 0.2%
  - Other: 0.7%
  - Two or more races: 7.1%

Registration
  - Democratic: 57%
  - Republican: 8%
  - Non-affiliated voters (NAVs): 29%
  - Other party: 5%

Portland's 4th City Council district is one of four multi-member districts electing three people to Portland City Council in Portland, Oregon. The district contains all of Portland west of the Willamette River (Northwest, Southwest, and South sextants) as well as a small area on the east side consisting of the three neighborhoods of Eastmoreland, Reed, and Sellwood-Moreland.

The district contains the neighborhoods of Arlington Heights, Arnold Creek, Ashcreek, Bridlemile (including Glencullen), Collins View, Crestwood, Downtown, Eastmoreland, Far Southwest, Forest Park, Goose Hollow, Hayhurst (including Vermont Hills), Hillsdale, Hillside, Homestead, Linnton, Maplewood, Markham, Marshall Park, Multnomah (including Multnomah Village), Northwest District (including Uptown, Nob Hill, and the Alphabet Historic District), Northwest Heights, Northwest Industrial, Old Town Chinatown, Pearl District, Reed, Sellwood-Moreland, South Burlingame, South Portland (including Corbett, Fulton, Lair Hill, Terwilliger, and the Johns Landing and South Waterfront developments), Southwest Hills, Sylvan-Highlands, West Portland Park (including Capitol Hill), and York Plan District.

District 4 is currently represented on Portland City Council by Olivia Clark, Mitch Green, and Eric Zimmerman. They were elected to two-year terms in 2024; after the 2026 election, all future terms will be four years.

Clark was the only member of City Council to have reached the 25% threshold for election in the first round of voting. Zimmerman is the only member of City Council to not place in the top 3 in the first round of ranked-choice voting tabulation in the 2024 election, placing 4th and only winning after the votes were fully tabulated.

== Election results ==
=== 2024 ===
This district's race in the 2024 Portland City Council election was notable for having the only change in the winner due to transfers performed under the single transferable vote system. Eli Arnold captured the third-most first preferences in the first round of tabulation, leading Eric Zimmerman by just over 100 votes. However, Zimmerman received enough transfers (due voters' second- through sixth-place rankings on ballots that were transferred from eliminated candidates) to surpass Arnold's final vote total by just under 800 votes in further rounds of tabulation, and beat him out to the district's third seat.

==== Results ====
2024 Portland, Oregon City Council election, District 4 results

2024 Portland, Oregon City Council election, District 4
| Party | Candidate | FPv% | Count | | | | | | | | | | | | | | | | | | | | | | | | | | | | | | | |
| Party | Candidate | FPv% | 1 | 2 | 3 | 4 | 5 | 6 | 7 | 8 | 9 | 10 | 11 | 12 | 13 | 14 | 15 | 16 | 17 | 18 | 19 | 20 | 21 | 22 | 23 | 24 | 25 | 26 | 27 | 28 | 29 | 30 | 31 | Count 32 |
|---|---|---|---|---|---|---|---|---|---|---|---|---|---|---|---|---|---|---|---|---|---|---|---|---|---|---|---|---|---|---|---|---|---|---|
| Nonpartisan | Olivia Clark | 24.9 | 19,138 | 19,140 | 19,151 | 19,157 | 19,160 | 19,165 | 19,182 | 19,180 | 19,180 | 19,180 | 19,180 | 19,180 | 19,180 | 19,180 | 19,180 | 19,180 | 19,180 | 19,180 | 19,180 | 19,180 | 19,180 | 19,180 | 19,180 | 19,180 | 19,180 | 19,180 | 19,180 | 19,180 | 19,180 | 19,180 | 19,180 | 19,180 |
| Nonpartisan | Mitch Green | 13.5 | 10,387 | 10,388 | 10,389 | 10,404 | 10,410 | 10,412 | 10,419 | 10,419.1 | 10,424.1 | 10,442.1 | 10,461.1 | 10,487.1 | 10,544.1 | 10,556.1 | 10,588.1 | 10,628.1 | 10,676.1 | 10,728.1 | 10,803.1 | 10,881.1 | 10,991.1 | 11,187.1 | 11,639.1 | 11,751.1 | 12,019.1 | 12,816.1 | 14,412.2 | 16,700.2 | 20,153.3 | 19,180 | 19,180 | 19,180 |
| Nonpartisan | Eric Zimmerman | 10.4 | 8,005 | 8,005 | 8,013 | 8,015 | 8,035 | 8,059 | 8,065 | 8,065.93 | 8,072.93 | 8,085.93 | 8,091.93 | 8,102.93 | 8,107.93 | 8,120.93 | 8,149.93 | 8,171.93 | 8,231.94 | 8,329.94 | 8,492.94 | 8,722.95 | 8,809.95 | 8,938.95 | 8,973.95 | 9,403.96 | 10,156 | 11,052 | 11,507 | 12,344 | 13,656.1 | 13,773.2 | 20,232.2 | 19,180 |
| Nonpartisan | Eli Arnold | 10.6 | 8,123 | 8,123 | 8,124 | 8,132 | 8,146 | 8,180 | 8,188 | 8,188.19 | 8,194.19 | 8,203.19 | 8,220.19 | 8,237.19 | 8,245.19 | 8,252.19 | 8,263.19 | 8,289.19 | 8,319.19 | 8,482.2 | 8,666.2 | 8,863.21 | 8,913.21 | 9,177.21 | 9,217.21 | 9,632.21 | 9,921.22 | 11,178.2 | 11,478.3 | 12,085.3 | 12,810.3 | 12,899.5 | | |
| Nonpartisan | Sarah Silkie | 5.8 | 4,415 | 4,417 | 4,424 | 4,425 | 4,428 | 4,431 | 4,460 | 4,460.18 | 4,467.18 | 4,489.18 | 4,499.18 | 4,509.18 | 4,535.18 | 4,581.18 | 4,617.18 | 4,682.19 | 4,770.19 | 4,846.19 | 4,906.19 | 4,975.19 | 5,152.19 | 5,280.2 | 5,599.2 | 5,779.2 | 5,989.21 | 6,366.22 | 7,698.26 | 9,318.28 | | | | |
| Nonpartisan | Chad Lykins | 6.2 | 4,757 | 4,757 | 4,766 | 4,769 | 4,769 | 4,771 | 4,780 | 4,780.07 | 4,784.07 | 4,799.07 | 4,814.07 | 4,825.07 | 4,844.07 | 4,847.07 | 4,867.07 | 4,905.07 | 4,966.07 | 5,009.07 | 5,080.07 | 5,138.07 | 5,236.07 | 5,319.07 | 5,473.07 | 5,599.08 | 5,946.08 | 6,241.09 | 7,038.1 | | | | | |
| Nonpartisan | Lisa Freeman | 4.9 | 3,749 | 3,749 | 3,752 | 3,754 | 3,758 | 3,763 | 3,782 | 3,782.1 | 3,787.1 | 3,814.1 | 3,843.1 | 3,852.1 | 3,884.1 | 3,929.1 | 3,990.11 | 4,074.11 | 4,132.11 | 4,238.11 | 4,307.11 | 4,369.11 | 4,645.12 | 4,742.12 | 5,073.12 | 5,175.12 | 5,370.12 | 5,673.13 | | | | | | |
| Nonpartisan | Bob Weinstein | 5.1 | 3,891 | 3,892 | 3,899 | 3,900 | 3,901 | 3,903 | 3,910 | 3,910.07 | 3,918.07 | 3,930.07 | 3,937.07 | 3,958.07 | 3,964.07 | 3,974.07 | 3,994.07 | 4,019.07 | 4,064.07 | 4,116.07 | 4,191.07 | 4,357.07 | 4,397.07 | 4,530.08 | 4,617.08 | 4,856.08 | 4,978.08 | | | | | | | |
| Nonpartisan | Tony Morse | 2.6 | 2,004 | 2,004 | 2,009 | 2,013 | 2,015 | 2,019 | 2,020 | 2,020.05 | 2,022.05 | 2,031.05 | 2,042.05 | 2,055.05 | 2,065.05 | 2,066.05 | 2,076.05 | 2,091.05 | 2,113.05 | 2,159.05 | 2,209.05 | 2,270.05 | 2,330.05 | 2,434.05 | 2,539.05 | 2,659.06 | | | | | | | | |
| Nonpartisan | Ben Hufford | 2.2 | 1,694 | 1,694 | 1,698 | 1,698 | 1,700 | 1,705 | 1,706 | 1,706.04 | 1,709.04 | 1,711.04 | 1,714.04 | 1,718.04 | 1,730.04 | 1,733.04 | 1,741.04 | 1,750.04 | 1,767.04 | 1,832.04 | 1,909.04 | 1,966.04 | 2,023.04 | 2,089.04 | 2,107.04 | | | | | | | | | |
| Nonpartisan | Andra Vltavin | 1.8 | 1,355 | 1,355 | 1,356 | 1,359 | 1,360 | 1,360 | 1,365 | 1,365 | 1,369 | 1,388 | 1,404 | 1,408 | 1,441 | 1,466 | 1,473 | 1,535.01 | 1,555.01 | 1,564.01 | 1,593.01 | 1,604.01 | 1,738.01 | 1,803.01 | | | | | | | | | | |
| Nonpartisan | Kevin Goldsmith | 1.9 | 1,432 | 1,432 | 1,435 | 1,445 | 1,445 | 1,446 | 1,454 | 1,454.01 | 1,459.01 | 1,465.01 | 1,468.01 | 1,528.01 | 1,531.01 | 1,542.01 | 1,554.01 | 1,564.01 | 1,588.01 | 1,627.01 | 1,663.01 | 1,696.01 | 1,731.01 | | | | | | | | | | | |
| Nonpartisan | Chloe Mason | 1.3 | 979 | 980 | 984 | 988 | 990 | 993 | 1,001 | 1,001.01 | 1,004.01 | 1,011.01 | 1,020.01 | 1,029.01 | 1,046.01 | 1,091.01 | 1,105.01 | 1,189.01 | 1,212.01 | 1,241.01 | 1,338.02 | 1,352.02 | | | | | | | | | | | | |
| Nonpartisan | Stanley Penkin | 1.4 | 1,092 | 1,092 | 1,094 | 1,096 | 1,097 | 1,103 | 1,105 | 1,105.03 | 1,105.03 | 1,112.03 | 1,119.03 | 1,135.03 | 1,143.03 | 1,147.03 | 1,153.03 | 1,171.03 | 1,188.03 | 1,218.03 | 1,249.03 | | | | | | | | | | | | | |
| Nonpartisan | John Toran | 1.4 | 1,052 | 1,053 | 1,056 | 1,060 | 1,062 | 1,071 | 1,073 | 1,073.02 | 1,074.02 | 1,078.02 | 1,083.02 | 1,088.02 | 1,097.02 | 1,103.02 | 1,108.02 | 1,148.02 | 1,172.02 | 1,212.02 | | | | | | | | | | | | | | |
| Nonpartisan | Bob Callahan | 1.2 | 888 | 890 | 895 | 897 | 908 | 914 | 917 | 917.016 | 921.016 | 923.016 | 939.016 | 951.017 | 958.017 | 971.017 | 985.017 | 993.017 | 1,008.02 | | | | | | | | | | | | | | | |
| Nonpartisan | Moses Ross | 0.8 | 578 | 582 | 586 | 587 | 590 | 593 | 598 | 598.009 | 603.009 | 605.009 | 608.009 | 610.009 | 631.009 | 644.009 | 657.009 | 671.009 | | | | | | | | | | | | | | | | |
| Nonpartisan | Ciatta R Thompson | 0.7 | 531 | 531 | 532 | 535 | 537 | 544 | 547 | 547.006 | 548.006 | 559.006 | 567.006 | 570.006 | 579.006 | 592.007 | 602.007 | | | | | | | | | | | | | | | | | |
| Nonpartisan | Mike DiNapoli | 0.4 | 315 | 315 | 316 | 318 | 320 | 323 | 327 | 327.005 | 328.005 | 334.005 | 363.005 | 366.005 | 379.005 | 386.005 | | | | | | | | | | | | | | | | | | |
| Nonpartisan | Raquel Coyote | 0.4 | 317 | 319 | 319 | 319 | 322 | 325 | 329 | 329.003 | 333.003 | 338.003 | 344.003 | 355.003 | 361.003 | | | | | | | | | | | | | | | | | | | |
| Nonpartisan | Chris Henry | 0.4 | 301 | 302 | 303 | 304 | 304 | 305 | 309 | 309.002 | 310.002 | 323.003 | 333.003 | 341.003 | | | | | | | | | | | | | | | | | | | | |
| Nonpartisan | John J Goldsmith | 0.4 | 313 | 313 | 316 | 323 | 323 | 324 | 324 | 324.001 | 327.001 | 328.001 | 333.001 | | | | | | | | | | | | | | | | | | | | | |
| Nonpartisan | Joseph (Joe) Alfone | 0.3 | 257 | 257 | 258 | 260 | 263 | 265 | 268 | 268.003 | 270.003 | 272.003 | | | | | | | | | | | | | | | | | | | | | | |
| Nonpartisan | Michael Trimble | 0.3 | 230 | 230 | 230 | 230 | 231 | 234 | 237 | 237.002 | 237.002 | | | | | | | | | | | | | | | | | | | | | | | |
| Nonpartisan | Uncertified Write In | 0.3 | 232 | 232 | 232 | 233 | 233 | 233 | 233 | 233.001 | | | | | | | | | | | | | | | | | | | | | | | | |
| Nonpartisan | Kelly Doyle | 0.2 | 190 | 190 | 191 | 191 | 193 | 196 | | | | | | | | | | | | | | | | | | | | | | | | | | |
| Nonpartisan | Brandon Farley | 0.2 | 168 | 168 | 168 | 169 | 171 | | | | | | | | | | | | | | | | | | | | | | | | | | | |
| Nonpartisan | Patrick Cashman | 0.1 | 101 | 102 | 103 | 104 | | | | | | | | | | | | | | | | | | | | | | | | | | | | |
| Nonpartisan | Lee Odell | 0.1 | 100 | 101 | 102 | | | | | | | | | | | | | | | | | | | | | | | | | | | | | |
| Nonpartisan | Tony Schwartz | 0.1 | 100 | 100 | | | | | | | | | | | | | | | | | | | | | | | | | | | | | | |
| Nonpartisan | L Christopher Regis | 0.0 | 23 | | | | | | | | | | | | | | | | | | | | | | | | | | | | | | | |
Quota: 19,180
