= Neighborhoods of Portland, Oregon =

95 sections of the large Pacific Northwest city

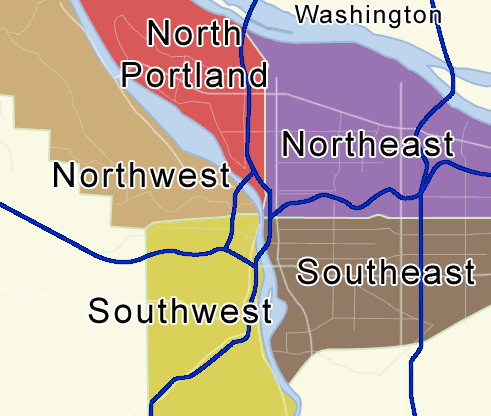
Map of Portland, Oregon's five sections, prior to the creation of South Portland in 2020.

Portland, Oregon is divided into six sections: North Portland, Northeast Portland, Northwest Portland, South Portland, Southeast Portland, and Southwest Portland. There are 95 officially recognized neighborhoods, each of which is represented by a volunteer-based neighborhood association. No neighborhood associations overlap the Willamette River, but a few overlap the addressing sextants. For example, most addresses in the South Portland Neighborhood Association are South, but a portion of the neighborhood is west of SW View Point Terrace where addresses have a SW prefix. Similarly the Buckman Neighborhood Association spans both NE and SE Portland.

Neighborhood associations serve as the liaison between residents and the city government, as coordinated by the city's Office of Community & Civic Life, which was created in 1974 and known as the Office of Neighborhood Involvement until July 2018. The city subsequently provides funding to this "network of neighborhoods" through district coalitions, which are groupings of neighborhood associations. A few areas of Portland are "unclaimed" by any of the 95 neighborhood associations in Portland.

== Neighborhoods ==
Each neighborhood association defines its own boundaries, which may include areas outside of Portland city limits and (if mutually agreed) areas that overlap with other neighborhoods. Neighborhoods may span boundaries between the six sections (North Portland, Northeast Portland, Northwest Portland, South Portland, Southeast Portland, and Southwest Portland) of the city as well. The segmentation adopted here is based on Office of Community & Civic Life's district coalition model, under which each neighborhood is part of at most one coalition (though some neighborhoods are not included in any).

Neighborhood name	Sextant	Coalition	Namesake	Image	Notes
Alameda	Northeast	Northeast Coalition of Neighborhoods	Alameda Land Company who laid out the first subdivision in the area		
Arbor Lodge	North	Northeast Coalition of Neighborhoods			
Ardenwald-Johnson Creek	Southeast	Southeast Uplift	Arden M. Rockwood, son of the man who first platted the area		Partially in Portland and Milwaukie. Neighborhood recognized by both cities.
Argay	Northeast	East Portland Community Office	Portmanteau of Art Simonson and Gerhardt "Gay" Stavney, planners of neighborhood.		
Arlington Heights	Northwest	District Four Coalition			
Arnold Creek	Southwest	District Four Coalition	Arnold Creek		
Ashcreek	Southwest	District Four Coalition			
Beaumont-Wilshire	Northeast	Northeast Coalition of Neighborhoods	Beaumont: beautiful mountain in French. Wilshire: Etymology unknown		
Boise	North, Northeast	Northeast Coalition of Neighborhoods	Reuben P. Boise, Oregon Supreme Court Justice		Includes Mississippi District.
Brentwood-Darlington	Southeast	Southeast Uplift			
Bridgeton	North, Northeast	Northeast Coalition of Neighborhoods	Bridgeton Slough, in turn named for the Interstate Bridge		
Bridlemile	Southwest	District Four Coalition			
Brooklyn	Southeast	Southeast Uplift	Large number of rivers, creeks, and lakes that historically occupied the neighborhood.		
Buckman	Southeast	Southeast Uplift	City Councilor Cyrus Buckman		
Cathedral Park	North	Northeast Coalition of Neighborhoods	Cathedral Park		
Centennial	Southeast	East Portland Community Office	United States Bicentennial		
Collins View	Southwest	District Four Coalition			
Concordia	Northeast	Northeast Coalition of Neighborhoods	Concordia University (now University of Oregon Portland)		
Creston-Kenilworth	Southeast	Southeast Uplift	Creston: Etymology unknown Kenilworth: Sir Walter Scott's Kenilworth. A Romance.		
Crestwood	Southwest	District Four Coalition			
Cully	Northeast	Northeast Coalition of Neighborhoods	Settler Thomas Cully.		
Chinatown	Northwest	District Four Coalition	Historically large number of Chinese businesses and residences		Northwest part of Old Town Chinatown, the Southwest part being Old Town.
Downtown	Southwest	District Four Coalition	Portland's Downtown		
East Columbia	North, Northeast	Northeast Coalition of Neighborhoods	Columbia River		
Eastmoreland	Southeast	District Four Coalition	Pioneer Julius C. Moreland		
Eliot	North, Northeast	Northeast Coalition of Neighborhoods	Rev. Thomas Lamb Eliot		Former center of Albina, Oregon before annexation with Portland.
Far Southwest	Southwest	District Four Coalition	Farthest southwest neighborhood of Portland		
Forest Park	Northwest	District Four Coalition	Forest Park		
Foster-Powell	Southeast	Southeast Uplift	Foster Road and Powell Boulevard, in turn named for Estacada farmer Philip Foster and settler Jackson Powell		
Glenfair	Northeast, Southeast	East Portland Community Office	Glenfair Park		
Goose Hollow	Southwest	District Four Coalition	Large amount of wild Geese who historically inhabited the area		
Grant Park	Northeast	Northeast Coalition of Neighborhoods	Grant Park, in turn named for President Ulysses S. Grant		
Hayden Island	North	Northeast Coalition of Neighborhoods	Hayden Island, in turn named for settler Gay Hayden		
Hayhurst	Southwest	District Four Coalition			
Hazelwood	Northeast, Southeast	East Portland Community Office			
Healy Heights	Southwest	Unaffiliated			
Hillsdale	Southwest	District Four Coalition	Tualatin Mountains (West Hills)		
Hillside	Northwest	District Four Coalition	Tualatin Mountains (West Hills)		
Hollywood	Northeast	Central Northeast Neighbors	Hollywood Theatre		
Homestead	Southwest	District Four Coalition	Location of the homestead of State Representative Philip Augustus Marquam		
Hosford-Abernethy	Southeast	Southeast Uplift	Hosford: Methodist Missionary Chauncey Hosford. Abernethy: Provisional Governor of Oregon George Abernethy.		
Humboldt	North, Northeast	Northeast Coalition of Neighborhoods			
Irvington	Northeast	Northeast Coalition of Neighborhoods	Irvington Investment Company, development company that helped create the neighborhood.		
Kenton	North	Northeast Coalition of Neighborhoods			
Kerns	Northeast, Southeast	Southeast Uplift	Settler William Kerns		
King	Northeast	Northeast Coalition of Neighborhoods	Rev. Martin Luther King Jr.		
Laurelhurst	Northeast, Southeast	Southeast Uplift	Laurelhurst Company, development company that helped create the neighborhood.		
Lents	Southeast	East Portland Community Office	Settler Oliver P. Lent		
Linnton	Northwest	District Four Coalition	US Senator Lewis F. Linn (D-MO)		
Lloyd District	North, Northeast	Northeast Coalition of Neighborhoods	Developer Ralph Lloyd, founder of Lloyd Center, once America's largest shopping mall		
Madison South	Northeast	Central Northeast Neighbors	James Madison High School (now Leodis V. McDaniel High School)		
Maplewood	Southwest	District Four Coalition			
Markham	Southwest	District Four Coalition			
Marshall Park	Southwest	District Four Coalition	Marshall Park, in turn named for Frederick C. and Addie Mae Marshall who donated the park to the city		
Mill Park	Southeast	East Portland Community Office			
Montavilla	Northeast, Southeast	Southeast Uplift	Portmanteau of Mount Tabor Village		
Mt. Scott-Arleta	Southeast	Southeast Uplift	Mt. Scott: Harvey W. Scott, editor of The Oregonian. Arleta: the daughter of one of the neighborhood's early developers.		
Mount Tabor	Southeast	Southeast Uplift	Mount Tabor, in turn named for the biblical Mount Tabor		
Multnomah/Multnomah Village	Southwest	District Four Coalition	Multnomah Tribe/Chief Multnomah		
North Tabor	Southeast	Southeast Uplift	Mount Tabor, in turn named for the biblical Mount Tabor		
Northwest District	Northwest	District Four Coalition	Northwest Portland		Includes Uptown, Nob Hill, Alphabet District, and Slabtown.
Northwest Heights	Northwest	District Four Coalition	Northwest Portland		
Old Town	Southwest	District Four Coalition	Original urban core of Portland. "Oldest part of town".		Southwest part of Old Town Chinatown, the Northwest part being Chinatown.
Overlook	North	Northeast Coalition of Neighborhoods	The neighborhood is located on a bluff that overlooks the city.		Includes Swan Island.
Parkrose	Northeast	East Portland Community Office			
Parkrose Heights	Northeast	East Portland Community Office			
Pearl District	Northwest	District Four Coalition	Coined by local journalist Terry Hammond for unknown reasons		
Piedmont	North, Northeast	Northeast Coalition of Neighborhoods			
Pleasant Valley	Southeast	East Portland Community Office			
Portsmouth	North	Northeast Coalition of Neighborhoods	Port of Portland		
Powellhurst-Gilbert	Southeast	East Portland Community Office	Named for two schools in the area, Powellhurst (in turn named for settler Jackson Powell) and Gilbert Heights (in turn named for settler William M. Gilbert).		Includes the recently formed Jade District.
Reed	Southeast	Southeast Uplift	Reed College, in turn named for pioneers Simeon Gannett & Amanda Reed.		
Richmond	Southeast	Southeast Uplift	Settler Richmond Kelly, son of Rev. Clinton Kelly.		
Rose City Park	Northeast	Northeast Coalition of Neighborhoods	Refers to Portland's nickname of the City of Roses.		
Roseway	Northeast	Central Northeast Neighbors	Refers to Portland's nickname of the City of Roses.		
Russell	Northeast	East Portland Community Office			
Sabin	Northeast	Northeast Coalition of Neighborhoods			
St. Johns	North	Northeast Coalition of Neighborhoods	Settler James John		
Sellwood-Moreland (Westmoreland)	Southeast	Southeast Uplift	Sellwood: Rev. John Sellwood Moreland: Pioneer Julius C. Moreland		
South Burlingame	Southwest	District Four Coalition			
South Portland	South	District Four Coalition	South of Downtown		Includes South Waterfront, Lair Hill, and Corbett
South Tabor	Southeast	Southeast Uplift	Mount Tabor, in turn named for the biblical Mount Tabor		
Southwest Hills	Southwest	District Four Coalition	Tualatin Mountains (West Hills)		Partially in Portland and unincorporated Multnomah County.
Sullivan's Gulch	Northeast	Northeast Coalition of Neighborhoods	Settler Timothy Sullivan		
Sumner	Northeast	Central Northeast Neighbors			
Sunderland	Northeast	Central Northeast Neighbors			Includes Dignity Village.
Sunnyside	Southeast	Southeast Uplift			
Sylvan-Highlands	Southwest	District Four Coalition	Roman God of the Woods, Silvanus		
University Park	North	Northeast Coalition of Neighborhoods	Portland Methodist Episcopal University (now University of Portland)		
Vernon	Northeast	Northeast Coalition of Neighborhoods			
West Portland Park	Southwest	District Four Coalition	West part of Portland		
Wilkes	Northeast	East Portland Community Office	The Wilkes Family of settlers		
Woodland Park	Northeast	East Portland Community Office			Portland's smallest neighborhood.
Woodlawn	Northeast	Northeast Coalition of Neighborhoods			
Woodstock	Southeast	Southeast Uplift	Sir Walter Scott's Woodstock		

== Other areas and communities ==
- Alberta Arts District, an art, retail, and restaurant area in the King, Vernon, and Concordia neighborhoods
- Albina, a historical city which was consolidated into Portland in 1891
- The Belmont Area, a retail and residential area in the Buckman, Sunnyside, and Mt. Tabor neighborhoods
- Dunthorpe, an affluent unincorporated enclave just beyond the city limits, north of Lake Oswego
- Unincorporated areas near Portland proper in Washington County (unincorporated neighborhoods expanding into Washington County)
  - Bethany
  - Cedar Hills
  - Cedar Mill
  - Garden Home
  - Metzger
  - Oak Hills
  - Raleigh Hills
  - Rock Creek
  - West Haven-Sylvan
  - West Slope
- East Portland, a historical city which was consolidated into Portland in 1891, not to be confused with the area of the same name that extends roughly east of I-205 to Portland's eastern boundary
- East Portland, the area of Portland generally east of I-205, where approximately one quarter of residents reside, but which has historically not received adequate city services.
- The Hawthorne District, a retail, restaurant, and cultural district running through the Buckman, Hosford-Abernethy, Sunnyside, Richmond, and Mt. Tabor neighborhoods
- Maywood Park, a Northeast neighborhood incorporated as a separate city that is now completely surrounded by the city of Portland
- Peacock Lane, a quaint English village in the heart of Sunnyside Neighborhood has been treating the city of Portland to free holiday lighting displays each December since the 1940s
- Vanport, a city located in present-day North Portland destroyed by a flood in 1948
