= Hillsdale, Portland, Oregon =

Hillsdale
- Neighborhood
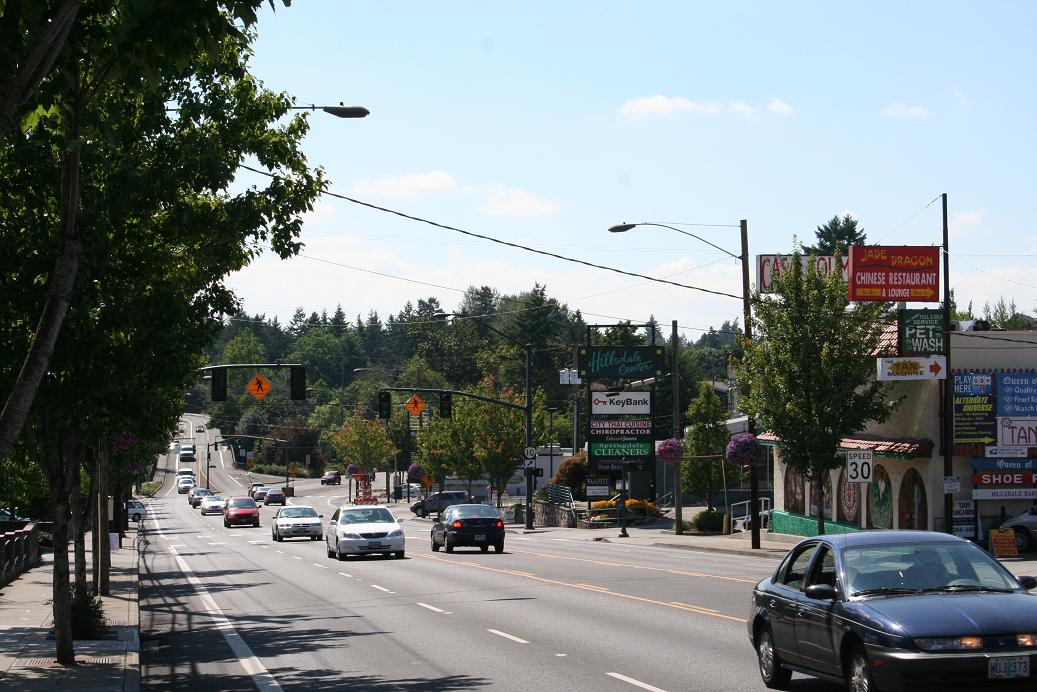
- Interactive map of Hillsdale
- Coordinates: 45°28′43″N 122°41′43″W
- Country: United States
- State: Oregon
- City: Portland

Government
  - Association: Hillsdale Neighborhood Association
  - Coalition: District 4 Coalition

Area
  - Total: 2.01 sq mi (5.20 km^{2})

Population (2020)
  - Total: 8,355
  - Density: 4,160/sq mi (1,610/km^{2})

Housing
  - No. of households: 3559
  - Occupancy rate: 96.2% occupied
  - Owner-occupied: 2313 households (65%)
  - Renting: 1246 households (35%)
  - Avg. household size: 2.3 persons

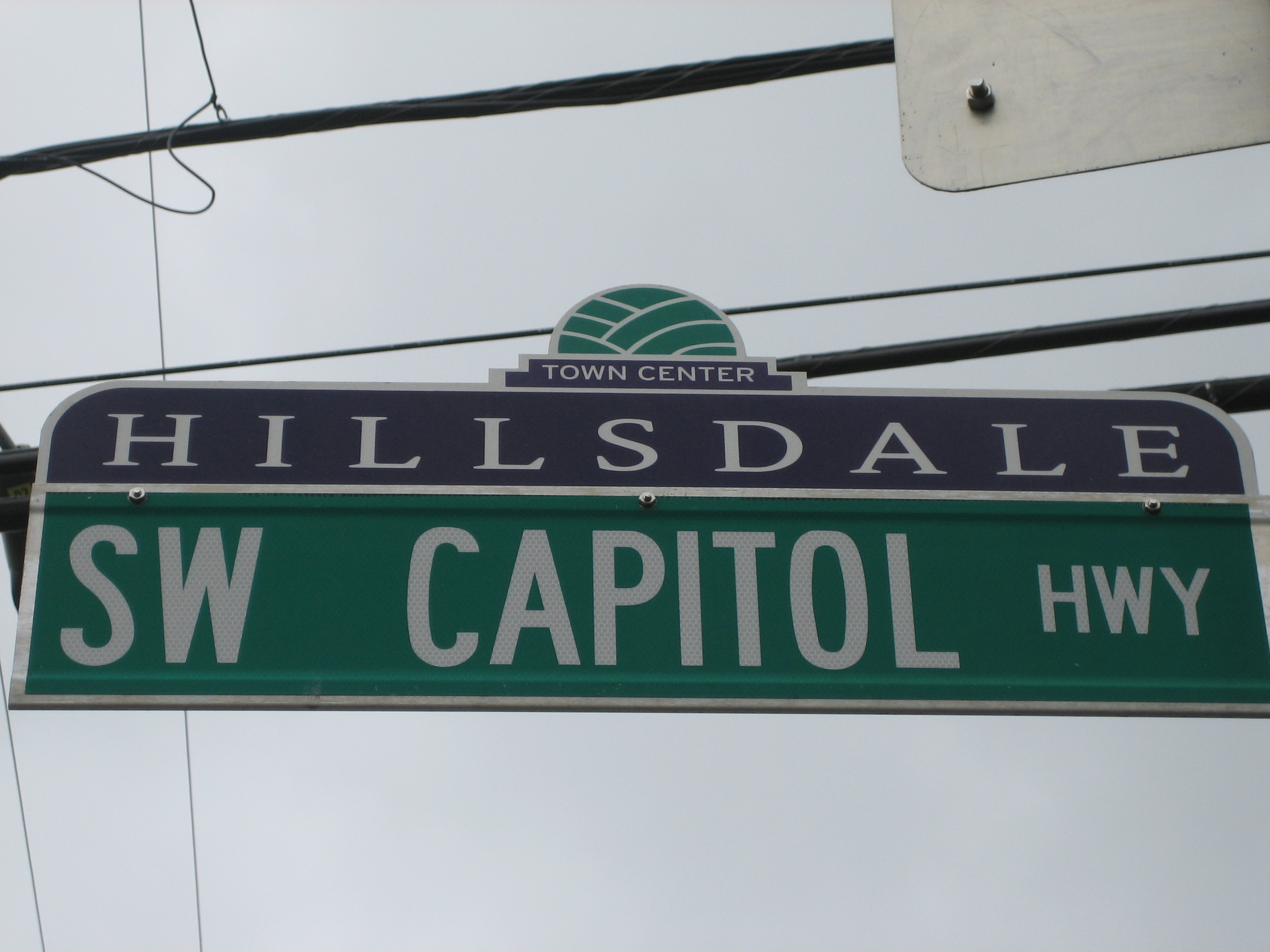
Hillsdale neighborhood street sign topper

The Hillsdale district is a neighborhood in the southwest section of Portland, Oregon, United States. It is centered on the Hillsdale retail and business area, a series of strip malls on SW Capitol Highway between SW Sunset Boulevard and SW Bertha Boulevard. It is home to the Hillsdale Farmer's Market, which takes place on Sundays during the summer and every other Sunday during the winter. Hillsdale is also home to Oregon's first brewpub, with the opening of McMenamins Hillsdale Brewery in 1985.

A cornerstone of the neighborhood is the Hillsdale Library, which opened in 1957. The building closed in 2001 for remodeling, and reopened March 4, 2004. When completed, the library was named a Certified Gold Leadership in Energy and Environmental Design Building. It was the first LEED building in Portland. As of 2019, the Hillsdale Library is the fifth-busiest branch in Multnomah County.

Hillsdale borders Southwest Hills, Healy Heights, and Homestead on the north, South Portland on the east, South Burlingame and Multnomah on the south, and Hayhurst and Bridlemile on the west.

Oregon Route 10 connects Hillsdale to Downtown Portland to the north and to Raleigh Hills and Beaverton to the west.

Hillsdale is the center of Portland's Jewish community.

== Education ==
Hillsdale's public education is covered by Portland Public Schools. Ida B. Wells-Barnett High School is located in the neighborhood, which serves it and the surrounding area. Other schools in the area are Rieke Elementary, which is adjacent to the high school, and Robert Gray Middle School.
