= Healy Heights, Portland, Oregon =

Healy Heights
- Neighborhood
- Interactive map of Healy Heights
- Coordinates: 45°29′30″N 122°41′56″W
- Country: United States
- State: Oregon
- City: Portland

Government
  - Association: Healy Heights Neighborhood Association

Area
  - Total: 0.058 sq mi (0.15 km^{2})

Population (1996)
  - Total: 133
  - Density: 2,300/sq mi (890/km^{2})

Housing
  - No. of households: 72
  - Owner-occupied: 66 households (92%)
  - Renting: 6 households (8%)

Healy Heights is a Portland, Oregon neighborhood in the West Hills of the city's Southwest section. Though recognized by the city as a neighborhood in its own right, it lies entirely within the boundaries of the city's Southwest Hills neighborhood.

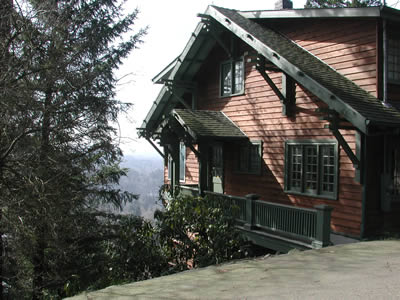
A hillside home in Healy Heights
