= Ashcreek, Portland, Oregon =

Ashcreek
- Neighborhood
- Interactive map of Ashcreek
- Coordinates: 45°27′22″N 122°44′14″W
- Country: United States
- State: Oregon
- City: Portland

Government
  - Association: Ashcreek Neighborhood Association
  - Coalition: District 4 Coalition

Area
  - Total: 0.98 sq mi (2.5 km^{2})

Population (2020)
  - Total: 4,692
  - Density: 4,788/sq mi (1,849/km^{2})

Housing
  - No. of households: 2012
  - Occupancy rate: 97.1% occupied
  - Owner-occupied: 1603 households (85%)
  - Renting: 285 households (15%)
  - Avg. household size: 2.3 persons

Ashcreek is a Southwest Portland, Oregon neighborhood. It borders Maplewood to the north, Multnomah and Crestwood to the east, Far Southwest to the south, and the Washington County communities of Garden Home–Whitford and Tigard to the west. Though like the city itself it lies mostly in Multnomah County, it extends a short distance into Washington County in several places on its western side.

Woods Memorial Natural Area is located in Ashcreek.

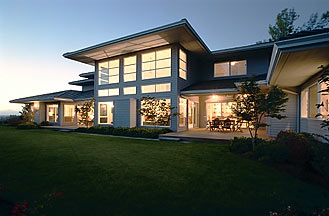
Image from the neighborhood

== Demographics ==
In 2020, 4,692 people lived in Ashcreek, down 19% from 5,780 in 2010.

In 2020, 80% of people identified as white, 8.0% as Asian, 2.3% as American Indian or Alaska Native, 2.3% as Black or African American, 0.6% as Native Hawaiian or Pacific Islander, and 7.0% as some other race. 7.6% identified as Hispanic or Latino (any race). The median age of Ashcreek residents was 41.4. The median household income was listed at $113,000 and 48% of the neighborhood was covered by tree canopy.
