= Northwest Industrial, Portland, Oregon =

Northwest Industrial
- Neighborhood
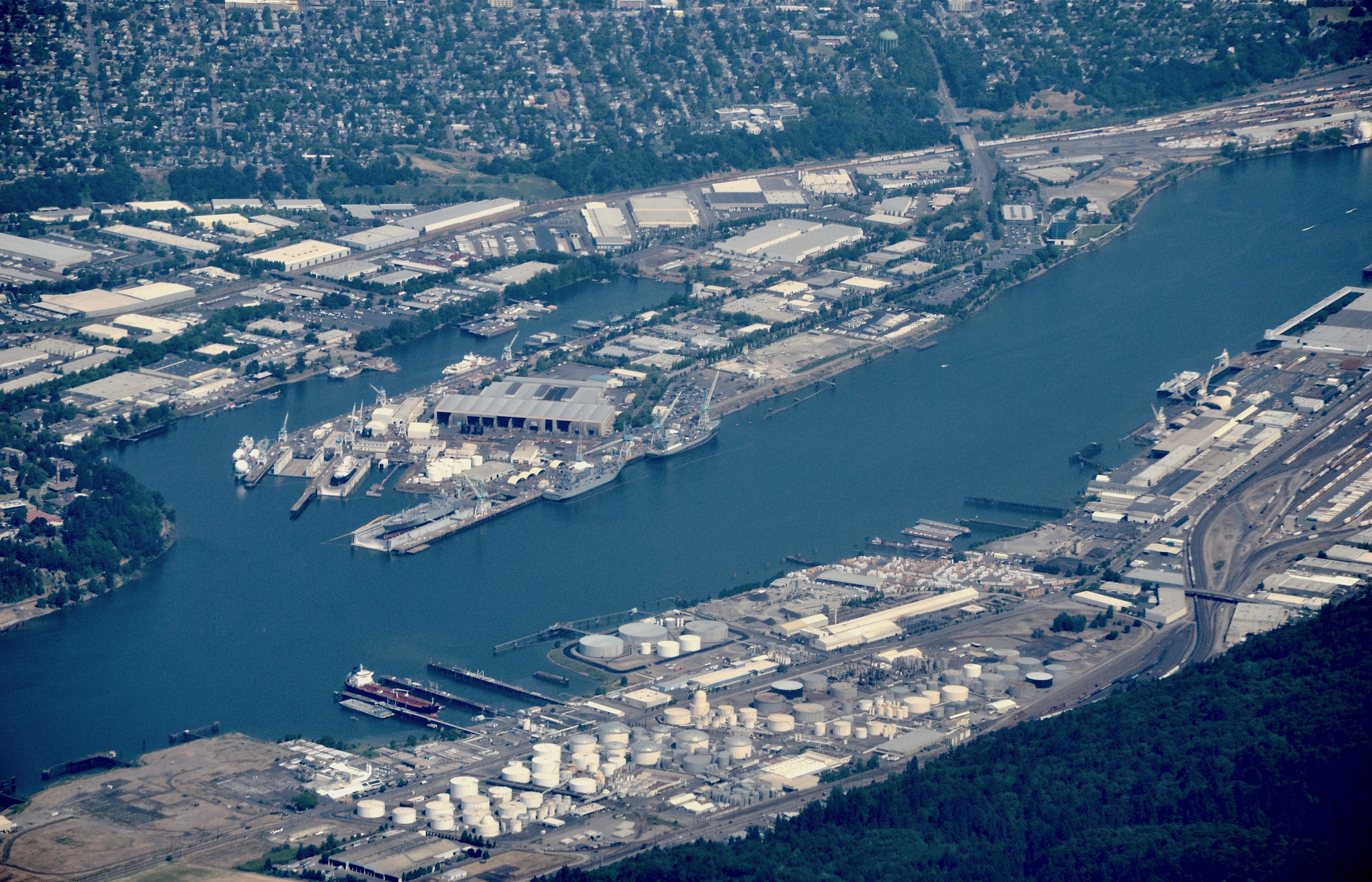
- Aerial view of a portion of the area (foreground) from the west in 2018, with Swan Island in the background
- Location in Portland
- Coordinates: 45°33′08″N 122°43′36″W
- Country: United States
- State: Oregon
- City: Portland

Government
  - Association: Northwest Industrial Neighborhood Association
  - Coalition: District Four Coalition

Area
  - Total: 1.84 sq mi (4.77 km^{2})

Population (2000)
  - Total: 21
  - Density: 11/sq mi (4.4/km^{2})

The Northwest Industrial Area is an almost entirely industrial area in the Northwest section of Portland, Oregon, United States. According to the Portland Bureau of Planning, it "is one of the few remaining large urban industrial districts in the United States" and "one of the premier heavy industrial districts in the Pacific Northwest". It borders the neighborhoods of Linnton on the north, Forest Park on the west, the Northwest District on the south, and Cathedral Park (via the St. Johns Bridge), University Park, and Overlook across the Willamette River on the east.

Burlington Northern Railroad Bridge 5.1 allows Amtrak and BNSF trains to cross the Willamette, connecting the neighborhood to North Portland and Washington state beyond.

There are no schools or parks in Northwest Industrial, which has the smallest population of all 95 neighborhoods in Portland. Since 2001 almost all of the neighborhood has been designated the Guild's Lake Industrial Sanctuary, to preserve the land for long-term industrial use and to resist pressure for residential development.

== History ==
The area was wetlands in the 19th century when Peter Guild, an early settler, received it as a donation land claim in 1848. In the 1880s the Northern Pacific Railroad built the Guild's Lake Rail Yard, and rail switching facilities have ever since played an integral role in the area's development (along with US Highway 30, which runs alongside the tracks here).

The Lewis and Clark Exposition in 1905 took place on the shore of Guild's Lake and on a semi-artificial island in the middle of the lake. Water was constantly pumped from the Willamette River to keep it full. The lake was subsequently slowly converted to landfill, a process completed in the 1920s.

During the Second World War a massive temporary housing complex provided residences and schools for shipyard workers and their families. It was removed soon after the war to make way for development of the area as an industrial and warehouse district.

Interstate 505 was to have run through the neighborhood, connecting I-405 with US Route 30 (St. Helens Road). The freeway spur was canceled in 1979, but US Highway 30 (Yeon Avenue) makes use of some of the infrastructure that was built before cancellation.
