= Arnold Creek, Portland, Oregon =

Arnold Creek
- Neighborhood
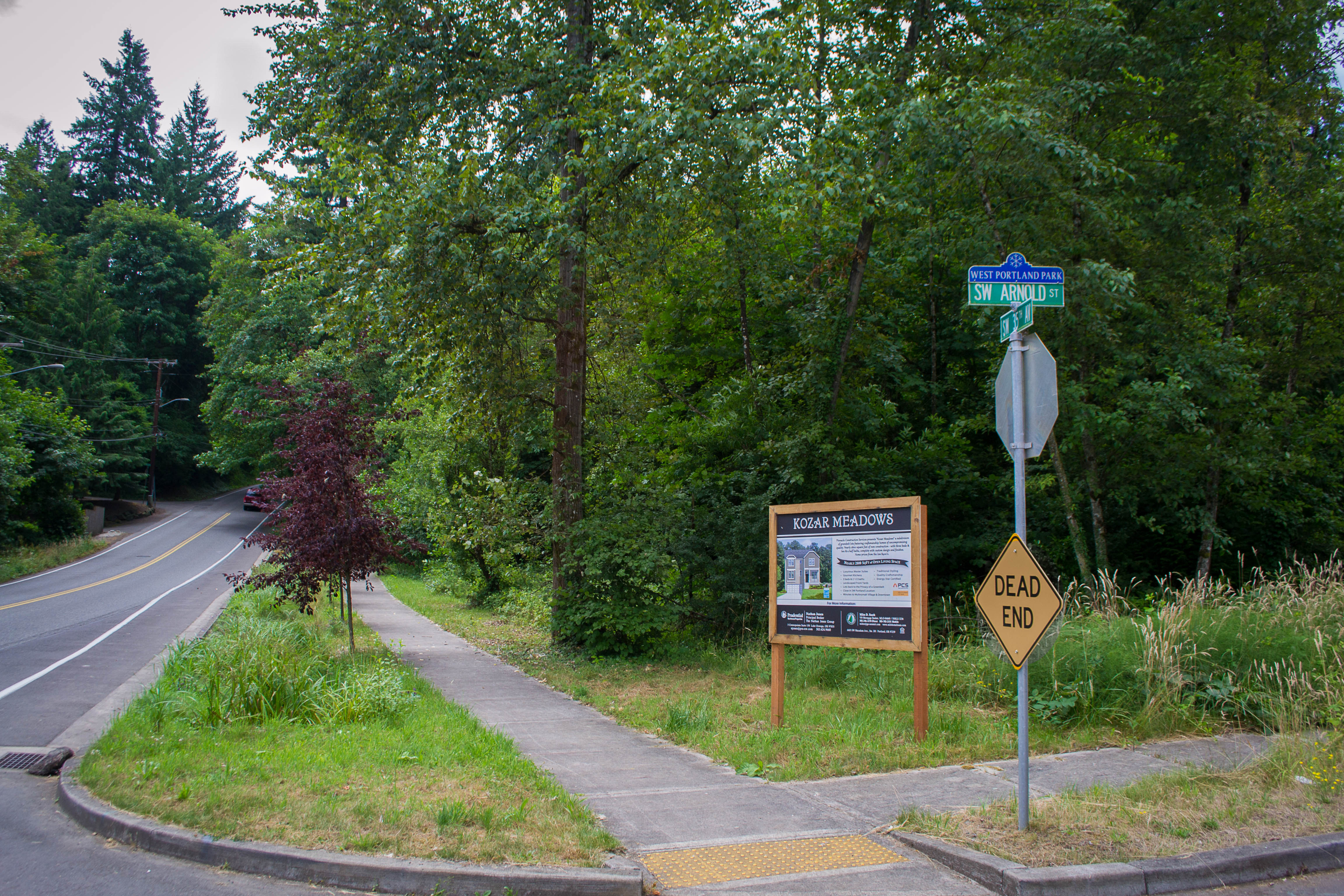
- SW Arnold Street at 35th Avenue
- Interactive map of Arnold Creek
- Coordinates: 45°26′29″N 122°41′59″W
- Country: United States
- State: Oregon
- City: Portland

Government
  - Association: Arnold Creek Neighborhood Association
  - Coalition: District 4 Coalition

Area
  - Total: 1.10 sq mi (2.8 km^{2})

Population (2020)
  - Total: 3,108
  - Density: 2,825/sq mi (1,091/km^{2})

Housing
  - No. of households: 1147
  - Occupancy rate: 97% occupied
  - Owner-occupied: 976 households (94%)
  - Renting: 61 households (6%)
  - Avg. household size: 2.7 persons

Arnold Creek is a neighborhood (and a creek) in the Southwest section of Portland, Oregon, just north of the city of Lake Oswego and Clackamas County. It borders West Portland Park to the west, Markham and Marshall Park to the north, Collins View and Tryon Creek State Natural Area to the east, and Lake Oswego and the unincorporated Multnomah County enclave of Englewood to the south.

Part of Maricara Natural Area (1988) is located in Arnold Creek (as well as in Markham).

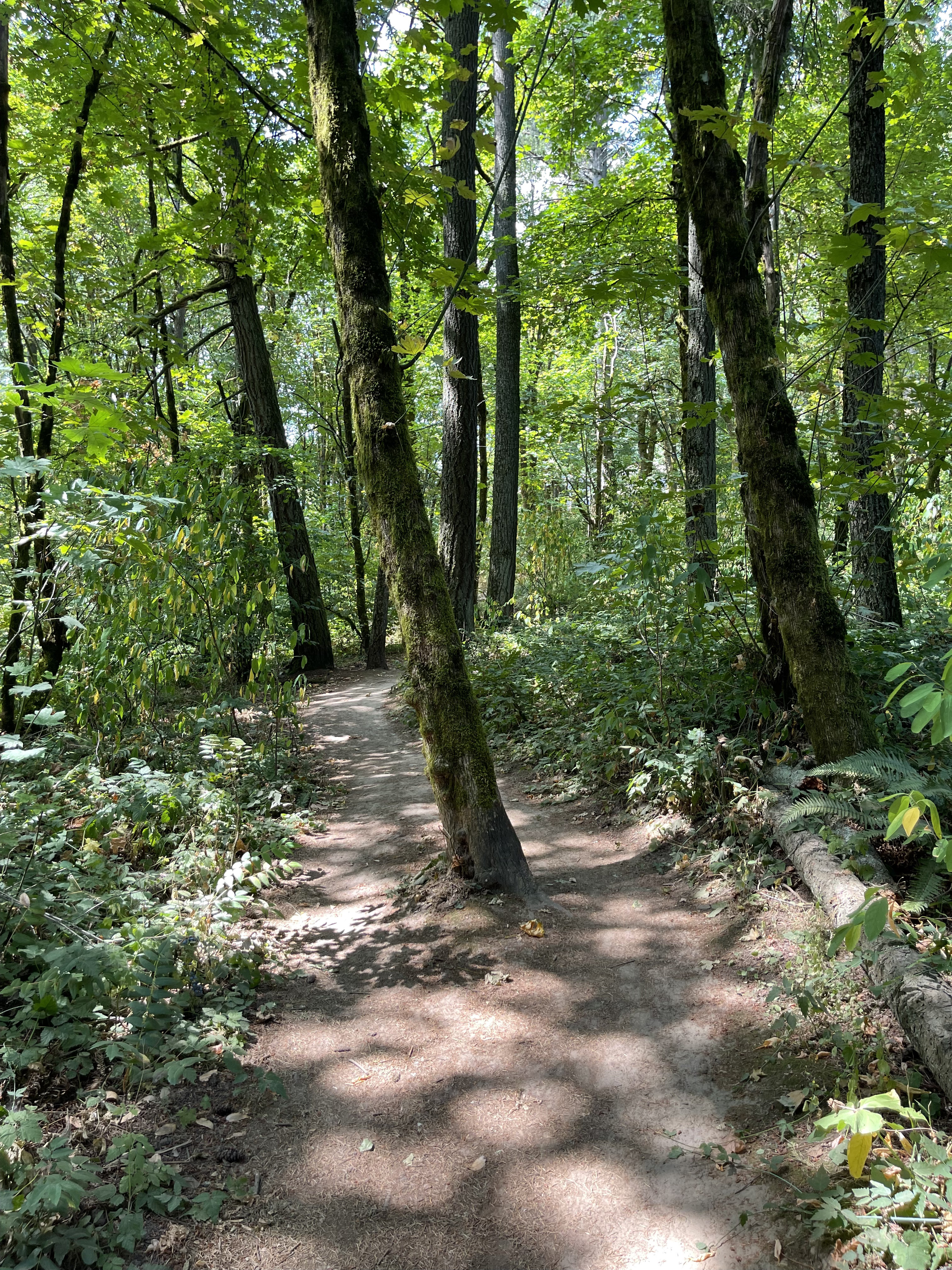
Maricara Natural Area

== Demographics ==
In 2020, 3,108 people lived in Arnold Creek, up 7% from 2,909 in 2010.

In 2020, 83% of people identified as white, 9.0% as Asian, 1.6% as Black or African American, 1.5% as American Indian or Alaska Native, 0.7% as Native Hawaiian or Pacific Islander, and 4.9% as some other race. 5.3% identified as Hispanic or Latino (any race). The median age of Arnold Creek residents was 46.8. The median household income was listed at $138,000 and 67% of the neighborhood was covered by tree canopy.
