= Far Southwest, Portland, Oregon =

Far Southwest
- Neighborhood
- Interactive map of Far Southwest
- Coordinates: 45°26′13″N 122°44′14″W
- Country: United States
- State: Oregon
- City: Portland

Government
  - Association: Far Southwest Neighborhood Association
  - Coalition: District 4 Coalition

Area
  - Total: 0.60 sq mi (1.55 km^{2})

Population (2000)
  - Total: 1,246
  - Density: 2,080/sq mi (804/km^{2})

Housing
  - No. of households: 500
  - Occupancy rate: 96% occupied
  - Owner-occupied: 401 households (80%)
  - Renting: 99 households (20%)
  - Avg. household size: 2.49 persons

Far Southwest is a neighborhood in the Southwest section of Portland, Oregon. It is bordered on the west by I-5; on the north by I-5, SW Pasadena St., and SW Pomona St.; on the east by SW 49th Ave. and Kerr Parkway; and on the south by SW Kruse Ridge Dr. and the southern border of the Portland Community College Sylvania Campus. The neighborhood is adjacent to the city of Tigard on the west, the neighborhoods of Ashcreek and Crestwood on the north, West Portland Park on the north and east, and the city of Lake Oswego on the east and south.

The campus of PCC Sylvania occupies much of the neighborhood. Lesser Park (1988) is also located here.
