= Collins View, Portland, Oregon =

Collins View
- Neighborhood
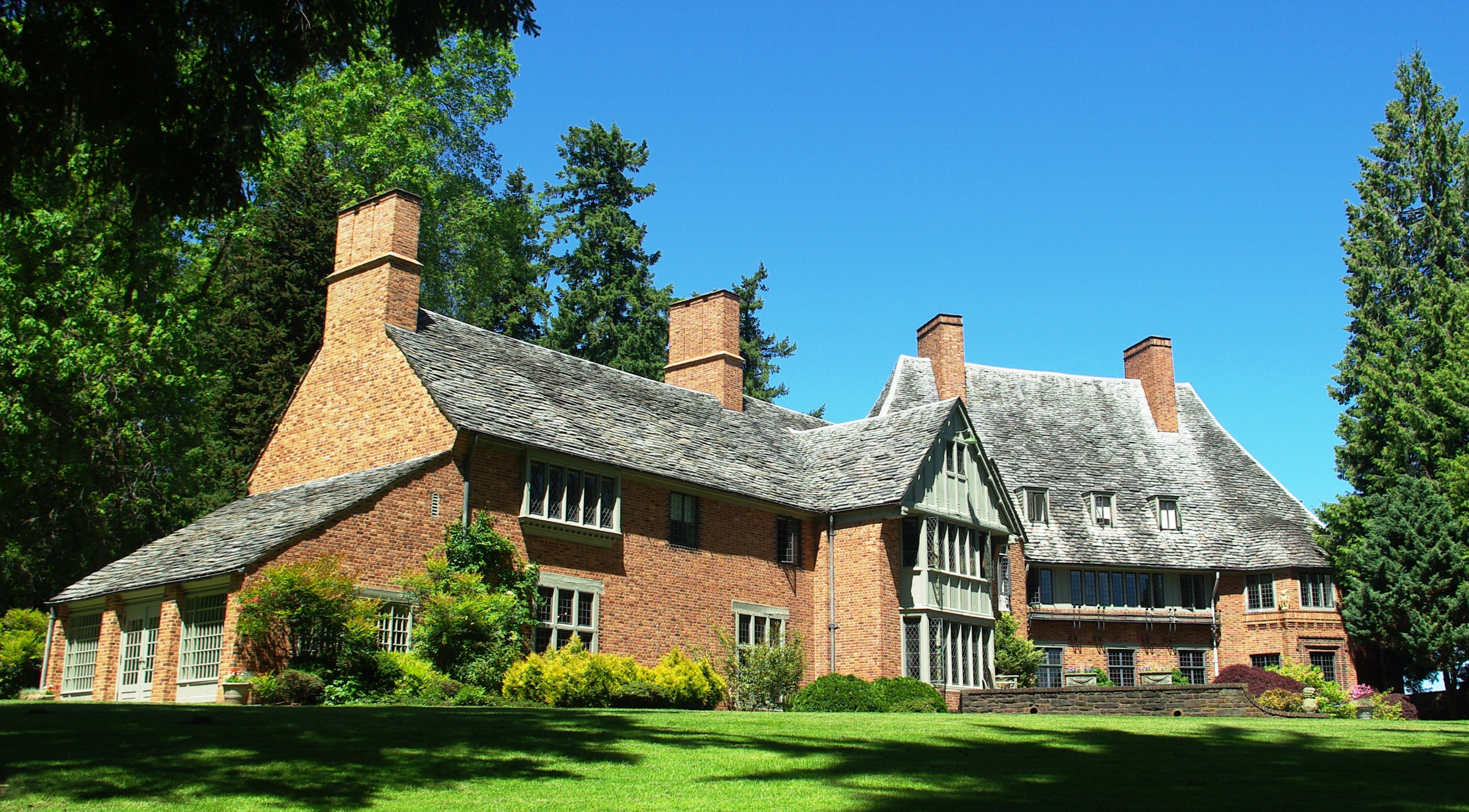
- L&C Frank Manor House at Lewis & Clark College
- Interactive map of Collins View
- Coordinates: 45°27′10″N 122°40′35″W
- Country: United States
- State: Oregon
- City: Portland

Government
  - Association: Collins View Neighborhood Association
  - Coalition: District 4 Coalition

Area
  - Total: 0.87 sq mi (2.3 km^{2})

Population (2020)
  - Total: 3,265
  - Density: 3,753/sq mi (1,449/km^{2})

Housing
  - No. of households: 854
  - Occupancy rate: 95.7% occupied
  - Owner-occupied: 567 households (78%)
  - Renting: 161 households (22%)
  - Avg. household size: 2.4 persons

Collins View is a neighborhood in the South and Southwest sections of Portland, Oregon. It borders the neighborhoods of Marshall Park and Arnold Creek to the west, Tryon Creek State Natural Area to the south, Dunthorpe (in unincorporated Multnomah County), River View Cemetery and River View Natural Area to the east, and the South Burlingame neighborhood to the north. The campus of Lewis & Clark College is located the southeastern portion of the neighborhood.

== Demographics ==
In 2020, 3,265 people lived in Collins View, up 10% from 2,972 in 2010. 81% of people identified as white, 8.3% as Asian, 3.4% as Black or African American, 2.0% as American Indian or Alaska Native, 0.6% as Native Hawaiian or Pacific Islander, and 5.8% as some other race. The median age in Collins View was 33.6. The median household income was listed at $154,000 and 63% of the neighborhood was covered by tree canopy. 47% of eligible residents voted in the 2020 general election.
