= West Portland Park, Portland, Oregon =

West Portland Park
- Neighborhood
- Location in Portland
- Coordinates: 45°26′N 122°43′W
- Country: United States
- State: Oregon
- City: Portland

Government
  - Association: West Portland Park Neighborhood Association
  - Coalition: District 4 Coalition

Area
  - Total: 0.73 sq mi (1.88 km^{2})

Population (2000)
  - Total: 3,775
  - Density: 5,200/sq mi (2,010/km^{2})

Housing
  - No. of households: 1570
  - Occupancy rate: 93% occupied
  - Owner-occupied: 813 households (52%)
  - Renting: 757 households (48%)
  - Avg. household size: 2.40 persons

West Portland Park is a neighborhood in the Southwest section of Portland, Oregon. It lies between SW 53rd Ave. in the west and SW 35th Ave. in the east, and I-5 in the north and SW Stephenson St. (Portland city limits) in the south. (Two small sections extend further south, a parcel at the end of SW 47th Ave. and the "Kerr Site" between SW 39th Ave. and SW 37th Ave., following irregularities in Portland's southern border.) South of SW Pomona St., the western border is SW 49th Ave. The neighborhood borders Crestwood and Far Southwest to the west, Multnomah to the north, Markham and Arnold Creek to the east, and the city of Lake Oswego to the south.

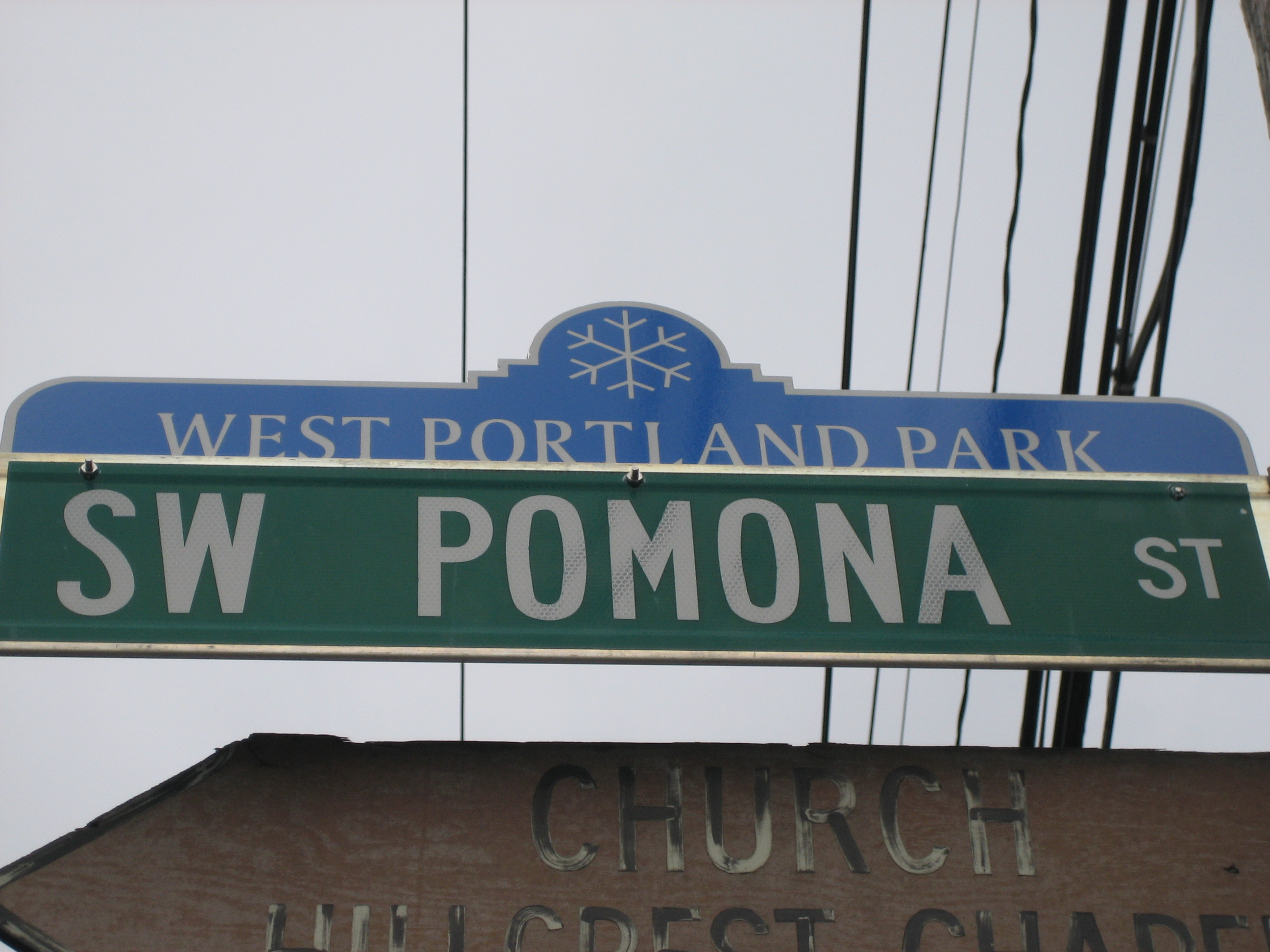
West Portland Park neighborhood street sign topper

The northern part of the neighborhood is called Capitol Hill, site of the Capitol Hill Library, the Islamic Center of Portland, the Portland Rizwan Mosque (of the Ahmadiyya Muslim Community), and the Islamic School of Portland.

Jackson Middle School and Markham Elementary School are in West Portland Park.

Public open space in the neighborhood includes the Kerr Site, which was purchased jointly by the City of Portland and City of Lake Oswego with the intent of eventually installing walking trails; Loll Wildwood, the Metro greenspace at the headwaters of Arnold Creek, formerly known as the West Portland Park Natural Area (purchased in 1995 for protection of wildlife habitat and water quality); and the Holly Farm Park, completed in 2007 after a partnership between the Parks Foundation, Portland Parks & Recreation, and the West Portland Park Neighborhood Association.
