= South Portland, Oregon =

Sextant of Portland, Oregon, U.S.

South Portland is a sextant of Portland, Oregon and the complement to North Portland, a group of contiguous neighborhoods delimited by geographical boundaries.

The region is bounded on the east by the Willamette River and on the west by Southwest Naito Parkway, Southwest View Point Terrace, and Tryon Creek State Natural Area. South Portland includes approximately 10,000 properties in the Collins View and South Waterfront neighborhoods, as well as portions of the Lewis and Clark College and Oregon Health & Science University campuses.

== History ==
Prior to the establishment of this area, the South Portland area was part of the Southwest Portland quadrant. Because the Willamette River curves to the southeast beyond downtown, addresses to the east of Naito Parkway were numbered with a leading zero to differentiate the address from an address to the west on the same east-west street (e.g. 100 SW vs. 0100 SW). However, emergency dispatch systems and mapping software had difficulty with the leading zeroes, making the change necessary.

The Portland City Council approved the split of South Portland from Southwest Portland on June 6, 2018. Leading zero addresses in Southwest were given the same number without the leading zero in South (e.g. 0100 SW to 100 S). City officials began installing updated street signs in May 2020, and older signage will be removed in 2025. The United States Postal Service will be able to use either address system.
