= South Portland, Portland, Oregon =

South Portland
- Neighborhood
- Location in Portland
- Coordinates: 45°29′24″N 122°40′37″W
- Country: United States
- State: Oregon
- City: Portland

Government
  - Association: South Portland Neighborhood Association
  - Coalition: District 4 Coalition

Area
  - Total: 1.67 sq mi (4.33 km^{2})

Population (2000)
  - Total: 5,079
  - Density: 3,040/sq mi (1,170/km^{2})

Housing
  - No. of households: 2904
  - Owner-occupied: 1220 households (42%)
  - Renting: 1684 households (58%)

South Portland is a long, narrow neighborhood just south of Downtown Portland, Oregon, hemmed in between the Willamette River and the West Hills. It stretches from I-405 and the Marquam Bridge on the north, to SW Canby St. and the Sellwood Bridge in the south. The Willamette forms the eastern boundary, and SW Barbur Blvd. most of the western boundary. In addition to Downtown to the north, other bordering neighborhoods are Southwest Hills, Homestead, Hillsdale, and South Burlingame to the west, and Hosford-Abernethy, Brooklyn, and Sellwood-Moreland across the river on the east.

The neighborhood, formerly known as Corbett-Terwilliger-Lair Hill or CTLH, changed its name at a meeting of its neighborhood association on September 6, 2006, to be more concise and inclusive. South Portland was the name of a 19th-century community that overlapped the present day neighborhood.

== Areas ==
The neighborhood is a collection of very different areas.

- South Waterfront. The northeastern part of the neighborhood is the site of a large-scale, high-density district currently under construction. The Portland Aerial Tram links the district to the Oregon Health & Science University campus in the Homestead neighborhood to the west, across Interstate 5. The Gibbs Street Pedestrian Bridge connects South Waterfront to Lair Hill.
- Lair Hill is in the northwestern part of the neighborhood, bordered by I-405 on the north, SW Barbur Blvd. on the south and west, and SW Naito Parkway on the east. It is named after a person, not a hill: the lawyer, author, and editor William Lair Hill. This area was part of historical South Portland, a district of Italian, Irish, and Jewish immigrants much of which was demolished by an "urban renewal" project in 1958. Vestiges remain in the form of synagogues and ethnic shops.
- Corbett. The Corbett area (and SW Corbett Ave running north–south through the entire neighborhood) takes its name from Senator Henry Winslow Corbett. It lies south of Lair Hill, bounded by I-405 on the north, SW Naito Parkway on the west, SW Macadam Ave. on the east. Its southern boundary is marked by the SW Corbett St. bridge over I-5. (This area of Portland should not be confused with the unincorporated community of Corbett, Oregon in eastern Multnomah County.)
- Terwilliger lies south of Corbett, between SW Barbur Blvd. and SW Macadam Ave, straddling Terwilliger Boulevard. The area takes its name from the old Terwilliger Park subdivision, served by the Terwil station on the Oregon Electric Railway.
- John's Landing. According to Oregon Geographic Names, the name refers to the B. P. John Furniture company, the largest of many manufacturers in the area in its industrial past, as well as architect John W. Storrs and John D. Gray, who privately transformed the area into a riverside residential and commercial development. The area used to be known as Fulton.

=== Historic district ===
Parts of the Lair Hill and Corbett areas are regulated to protect the historic significance of South Portland Historic District. Bounded roughly by SW Arthur, Front, Grover, Hood, and Curry Streets and SW Barbur Boulevard, it was listed on the National Register of Historic Places on July 31, 1998.

== Parks ==
- Butterfly Park - 7720 SW Macadam Ave.
- Caruthers Park
- Cottonwood Bay - SW Hamilton Ct. (off Landing Dr.)
- Duniway Park - SW 6th Ave & Sheridan St. Formerly a garbage dump, then landfilled and used for track and field by Portland State University and the YMCA in 1979.
- Front & Curry Community Garden - SW Naito Pkwy & Curry St.
- Heritage Tree Park - SW Corbett Ave & Lane St.
- Lair Hill Park - SW 2nd Ave & Woods St.
- SW Terwilliger Blvd. Parkway - SW 6th Ave - Sheridan St to Slavin St.
- Water & Gibbs Community Garden - SW Water Ave & Gibbs St.
- Willamette Park - SW Macadam Ave & Nebraska St.

== See also ==
- Zidell Yards
