= Bridlemile, Portland, Oregon =

Bridlemile
- Neighborhood
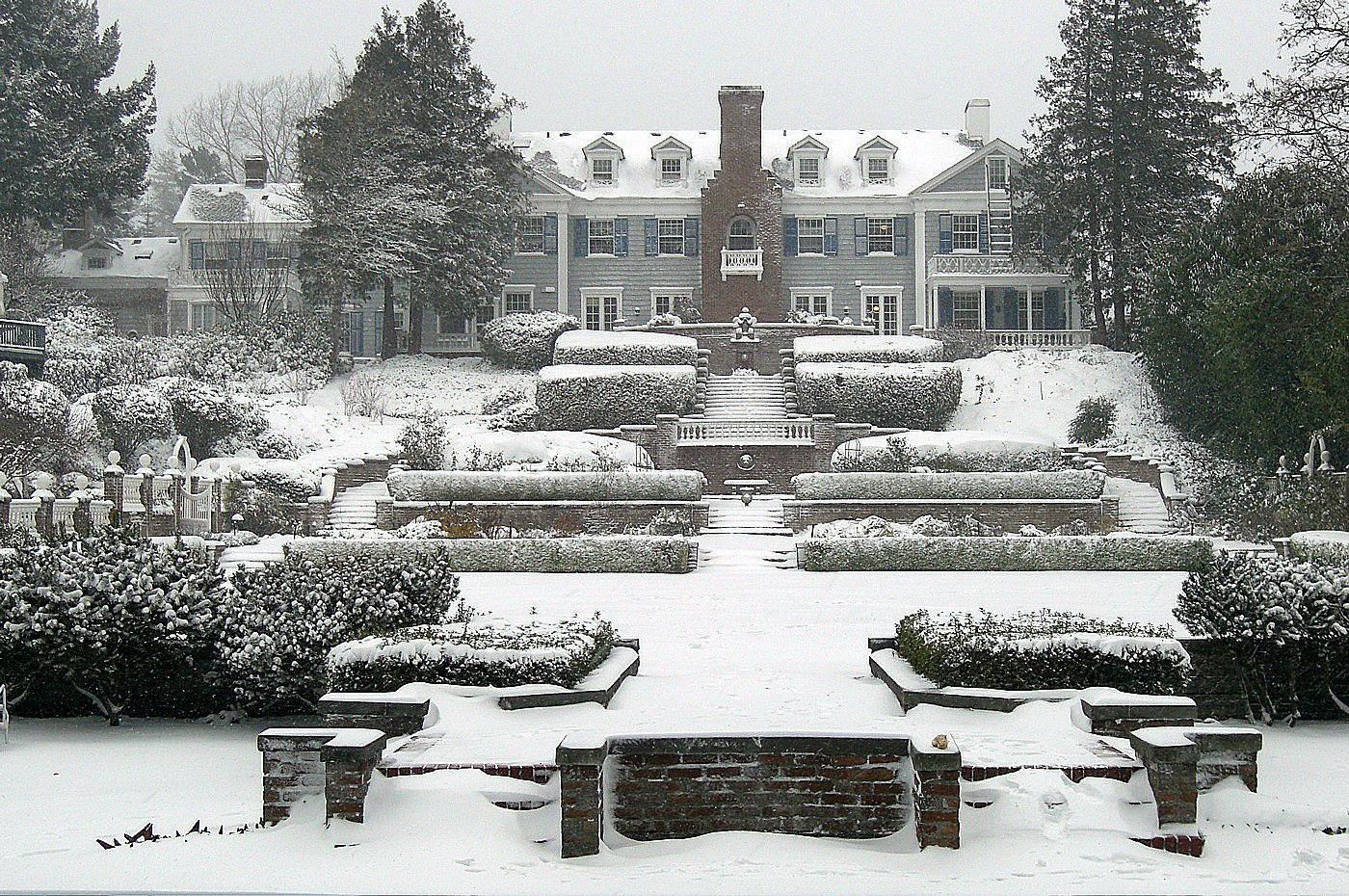
- Theodore B. Wilcox Country Estate
- Interactive map of Bridlemile
- Coordinates: 45°29′35″N 122°42′37″W
- Country: United States
- State: Oregon
- City: Portland

Government
  - Association: Bridlemile Neighborhood Association
  - Coalition: District 4 Coalition

Area
  - Total: 1.40 sq mi (3.6 km^{2})

Population (2020)
  - Total: 5,940
  - Density: 4,243/sq mi (1,638/km^{2})

Housing
  - No. of households: 2489
  - Occupancy rate: 96.4% occupied
  - Owner-occupied: 1642 households (68%)
  - Renting: 790 households (32%)
  - Avg. household size: 2.4 persons

Bridlemile is a Southwest Portland, Oregon neighborhood in the West Hills. The Portland city boundary runs through the neighborhood (aligned with SW Thomas St.) such that the southern part of the neighborhood is within Portland proper, but the northern portion is unincorporated Multnomah County. The portion within Portland city limits extends into Washington County in two places (along Beaverton-Hillsdale Highway, and along Hamilton Road).

The neighborhood is home to Bridlemile Elementary School (SW 47th Dr.) and adjacent Hamilton Park. Bridlemile is a primarily residential neighborhood, though it includes the commercial strip on the north side of Beaverton-Hillsdale Highway.

In 2004 and 2005, the neighborhood associations of Bridlemile and the Southwest Hills Residential League became entangled in an acrimonious dispute over a territory both claim.

Bridlemile includes the historical community of Glencullen, named after early settler Capt. John Winchell Cullen (1838–1939). A station of this name on the Southern Pacific West Side Line operated here from 1923 to 1925.

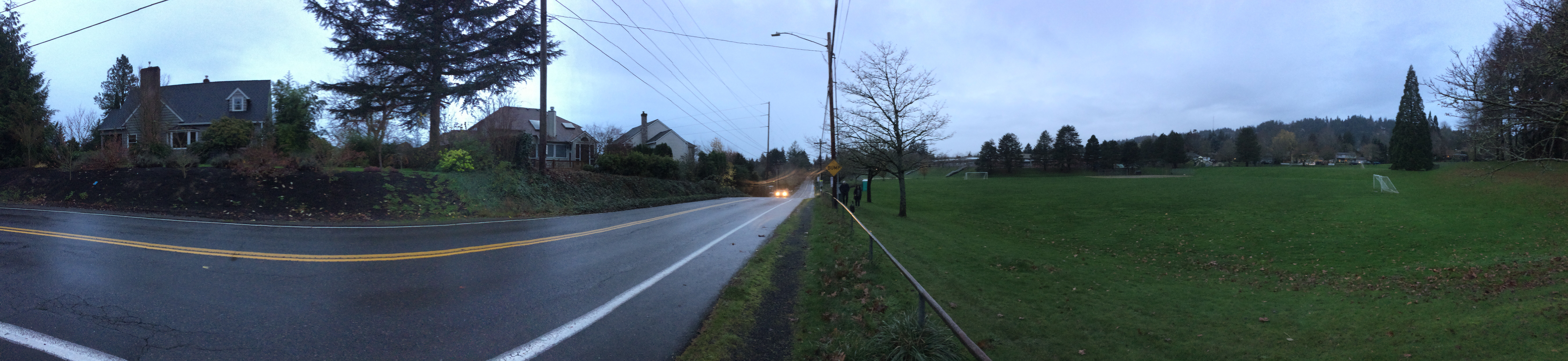
SW Hamilton St. and Hamilton City Park, near the center of Bridlemile

== Demographics ==
In 2020, 5,940 people lived in Bridlemile, up 7% from 5,537 in 2010. 81% of people identified as white, 7.5% as Asian, 2.7% as Black or African American, 2.1% as American Indian or Alaska Native, 0.6% as Native Hawaiian or Pacific Islander, and 6.3% as some other race. 6.0% identified as Hispanic or Latino (any race). The median age in Boise was 43.8. The median household income was listed at $102,000 and 50% of the neighborhood was covered by tree canopy. 86% of residents voted in the 2020 general election.

== Parks ==
- Fanno Creek Natural Area – SW 59th Ave & SW Hamilton St.
- Fanno Creek Greenway Trail
- Hamilton Park – SW 45th Ave & Hamilton St.
- SW Thomas & 53rd – SW 53rd Ave & Thomas St.
