= Linnton, Portland, Oregon =

Linnton
- Neighborhood
- Interactive map of Linnton
- Coordinates: 45°35′09″N 122°46′22″W
- Country: United States
- State: Oregon
- City: Portland

Government
  - Association: Linnton Neighborhood Association
  - Coalition: District Four Coalition

Area
  - Total: 5,281 acres (2,137 ha)

Population (2010)
  - Total: 941
  - Density: 114/sq mi (44.0/km^{2})

Housing
  - No. of households: 474
  - Occupancy rate: 85% occupied
  - Home owners: 315 (66%)
  - Renters: 88 (19%)
  - Avg. household size: 1.99 persons

Linnton is a neighborhood in Portland, Oregon, United States. It is located between Forest Park and the Willamette River along U.S. Route 30 (NW St. Helens Rd.), close to the agricultural community of Sauvie Island. It borders the neighborhoods of Northwest Industrial on the south, St. Johns and Cathedral Park via the St. Johns Bridge across the Willamette on the east, and Forest Park (with which it overlaps substantially) on the west. The neighborhood extends north somewhat beyond Portland city limits into unincorporated Multnomah County, ending at the Wapato Bridge.

== History ==
According to Oregon Geographic Names, the Town of Linnton was platted in 1843 by Peter Burnett (later, the first governor of California) and Morton M. McCarver. The two named the community for U.S. Senator Lewis F. Linn of Missouri, a proponent of settling the Oregon Country. Linnton had its own post office from 1889–1975. Industrialization began in 1889 when the Portland Smelting Company started to build a smelting plant, followed by the Linnton Manufacturing Company starting in 1892. Columbia Engineering Works arrived in Linnton in 1910.

Linnton was incorporated on October 5, 1910, after a vote on September 12. At that time it was a company town for Clark-Wilson and West Oregon lumber mills, and the Columbia Engineering Works shipyard. In 1913, the Portland Gas & Coke Company moved its manufacturing plant to the town's southern border large oil refiners began to purchase sites for shipping and storage. Linnton was soon annexed by Portland in 1915, bringing with it much of today's Forest Park.

In 2006 there was talk of secession following a rejection by Portland Mayor Tom Potter and two other city council members of a waterfront revitalization plan over toxic industrial waste concerns.

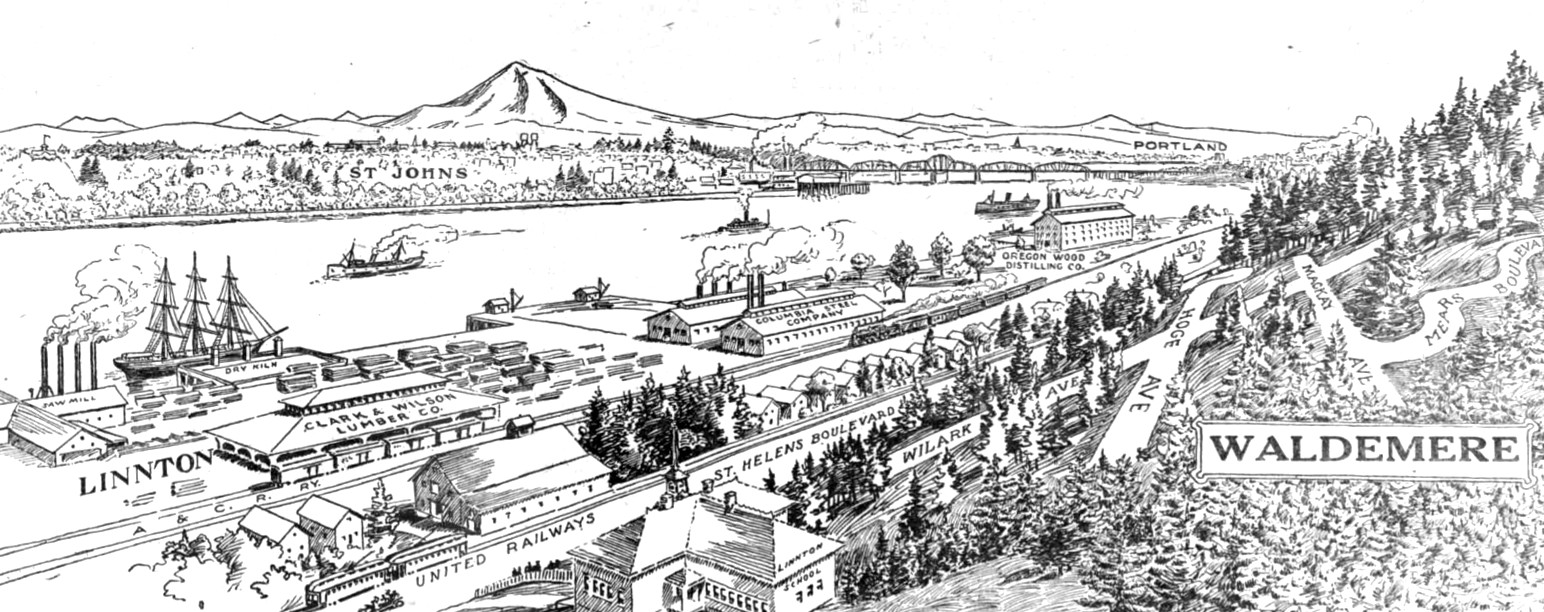
Sketch of Linnton from 1909

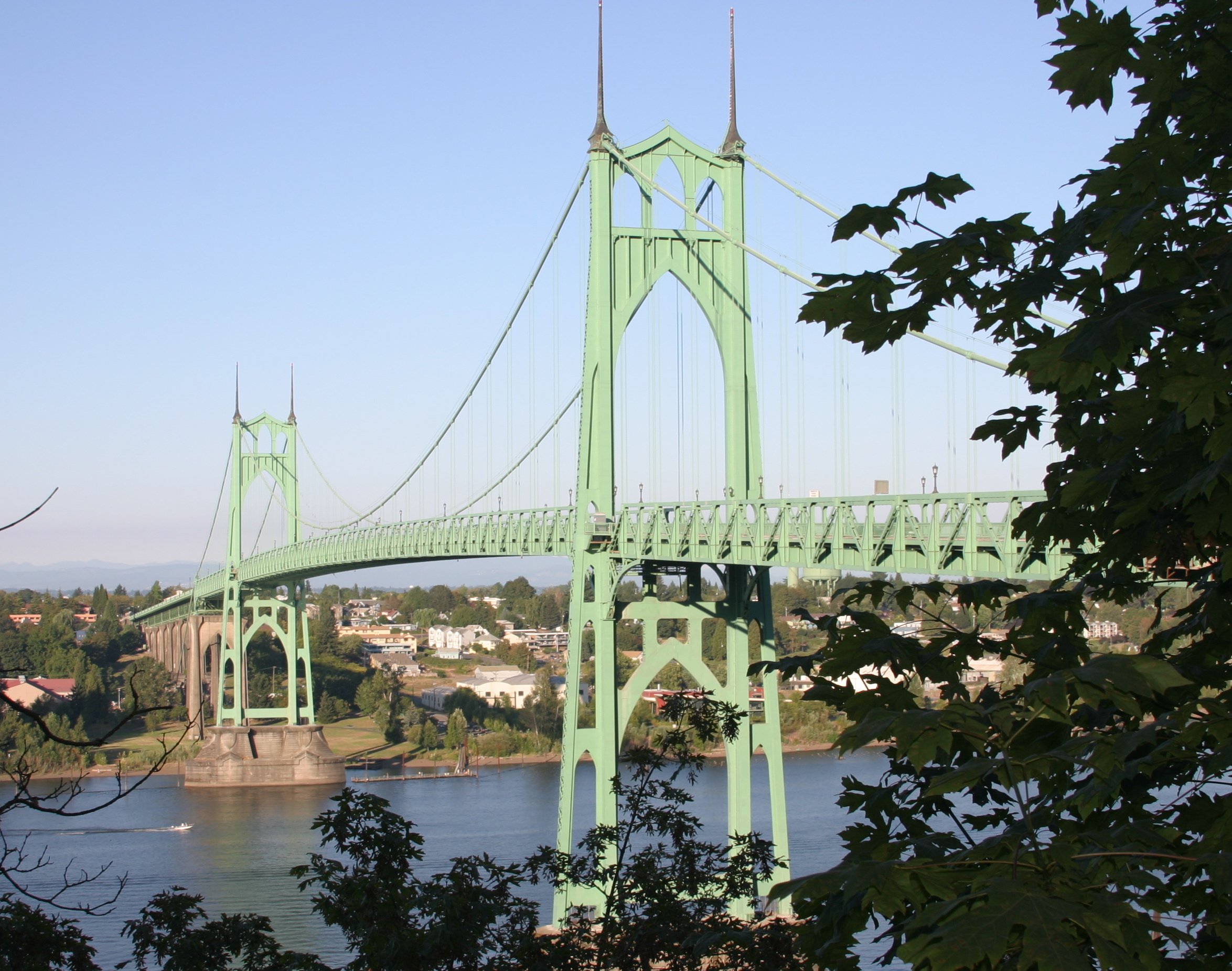
The St. Johns Bridge, as seen from Linnton

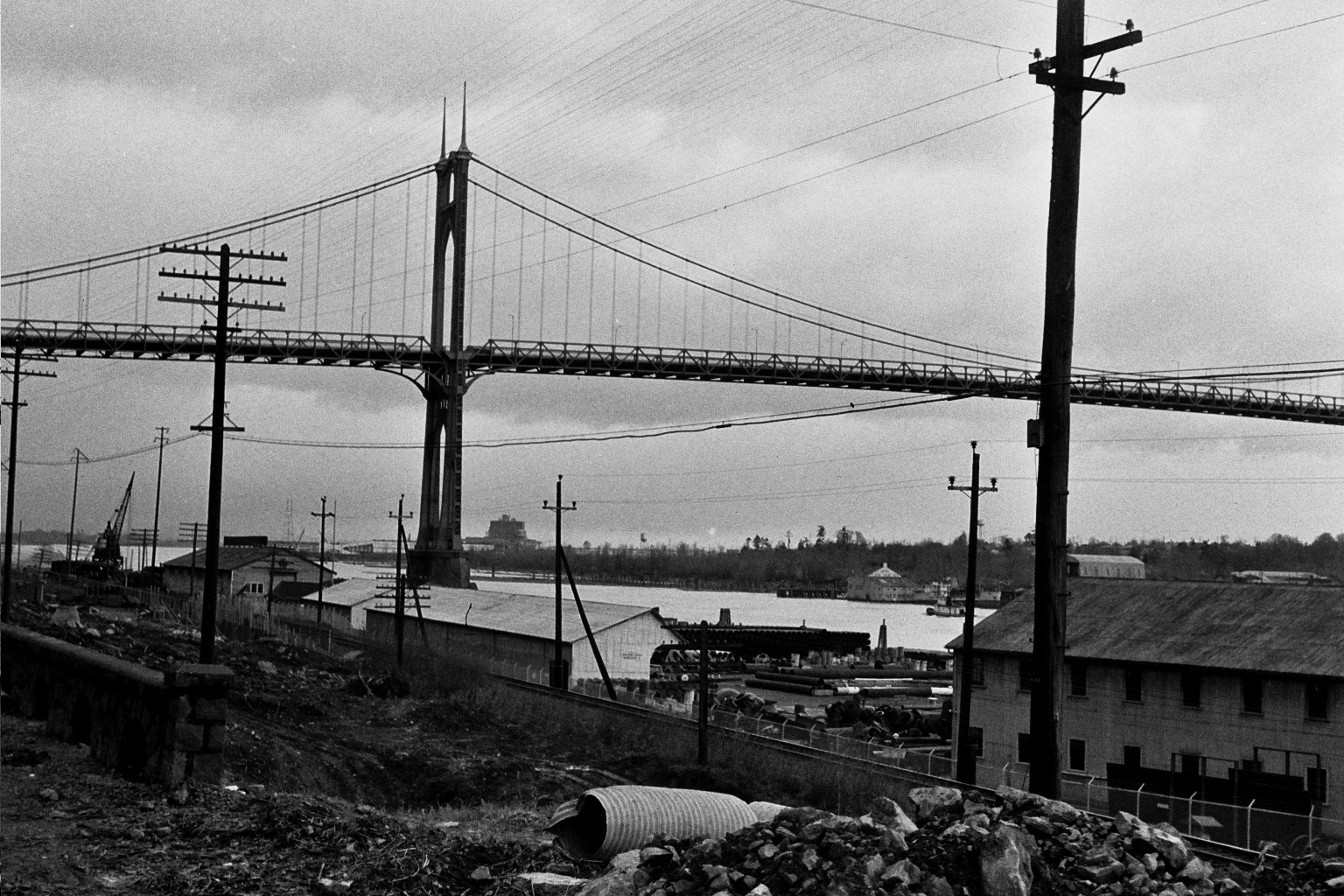
Linnton and the St. Johns Bridge in 1963

== Parks ==
- Clark & Wilson Property – NW Germantown Rd.
- Forest Park – NW 29th Ave. & NW Upshur St. to Newberry Rd.
- Kingsley Park – NW St. Helens Rd.
- Linnton Park – NW 105th Ave. & St. Helens Rd.

== Popular culture ==
Walter W. Cole, known as Darcelle XV, is from Linnton. The train hopping scenes from the movie Paranoid Park (2007) were filmed around the NW 107th Ave grade crossing. Leave No Trace (film) follows the real-life story of a father and daughter living above St. Helens Rd. in Forest Park, a part of Linnton.
