= Northwest Heights, Portland, Oregon =

Northwest Heights
- Neighborhood
- Location in Portland
- Coordinates: 45°32′28″N 122°46′12″W
- Country: United States
- State: Oregon
- City: Portland

Population (2020)
  - Total: 5,927
- Time zone: UTC-8
  - Summer (DST): UTC-7

Northwest Heights is a neighborhood on the west side of Portland, Oregon.

== Demographics ==
The neighborhood's total population was 5,927 as of the 2020 census, a 4% increase from 5,693 in 2010.

=== Ethnic demographics ===
As of 2020, Northwest Height's ethnic demographics were as follows:

- White: 4,466 (68%)
- Asian: 1,557 (23.5%)
- "Some other race": 343 (5.2%)
- African-American: 175 (2.6%)
- American Indian or Alaska Native: 75 (1.1%)
- Native Hawaiian or Pacific Islander: 22 (0.4%)

Non-Hispanic whites made up 64% (3,764) of the neighborhood's population. Hispanic and Latino Americans of any race numbered 323 (5.4% of the population).

== Parks and recreation ==
Parks include:

- Forest Heights Park
- Forest Park
- Mill Pond Park.

== Education ==
Educational institutions include:

- Forest Park Elementary School,
- West Sylvan Middle School
- East Sylvan Middle School
- Lincoln High School
