= Marshall Park, Portland, Oregon =

Marshall Park
- Neighborhood
- Interactive map of Marshall Park
- Coordinates: 45°27′15″N 122°41′44″W
- Country: United States
- State: Oregon
- City: Portland

Government
  - Association: Marshall Park Neighborhood Association
  - Coalition: District 4 Coalition

Area
  - Total: 0.61 sq mi (1.58 km^{2})

Population (2000)
  - Total: 1,427
  - Density: 2,340/sq mi (903/km^{2})

Housing
  - No. of households: 557
  - Occupancy rate: 97% occupied
  - Owner-occupied: 499 households (90%)
  - Renting: 58 households (10%)
  - Avg. household size: 2.56 persons

Marshall Park is a neighborhood in the Southwest section of Portland, Oregon. It gets its name from the adjacent Marshall Park donated to the City of Portland by Frederick C. and Addie Mae Marshall in 1948. It borders Markham to the west and north, South Burlingame to the north, Collins View to the east, and Arnold Creek to the south.

Parks in the neighborhood include Jensen Natural Area (1996), Foley-Balmer Natural Area (1996) and Marshall Park (1948).
