= Reed, Portland, Oregon =

Reed
- Neighborhood
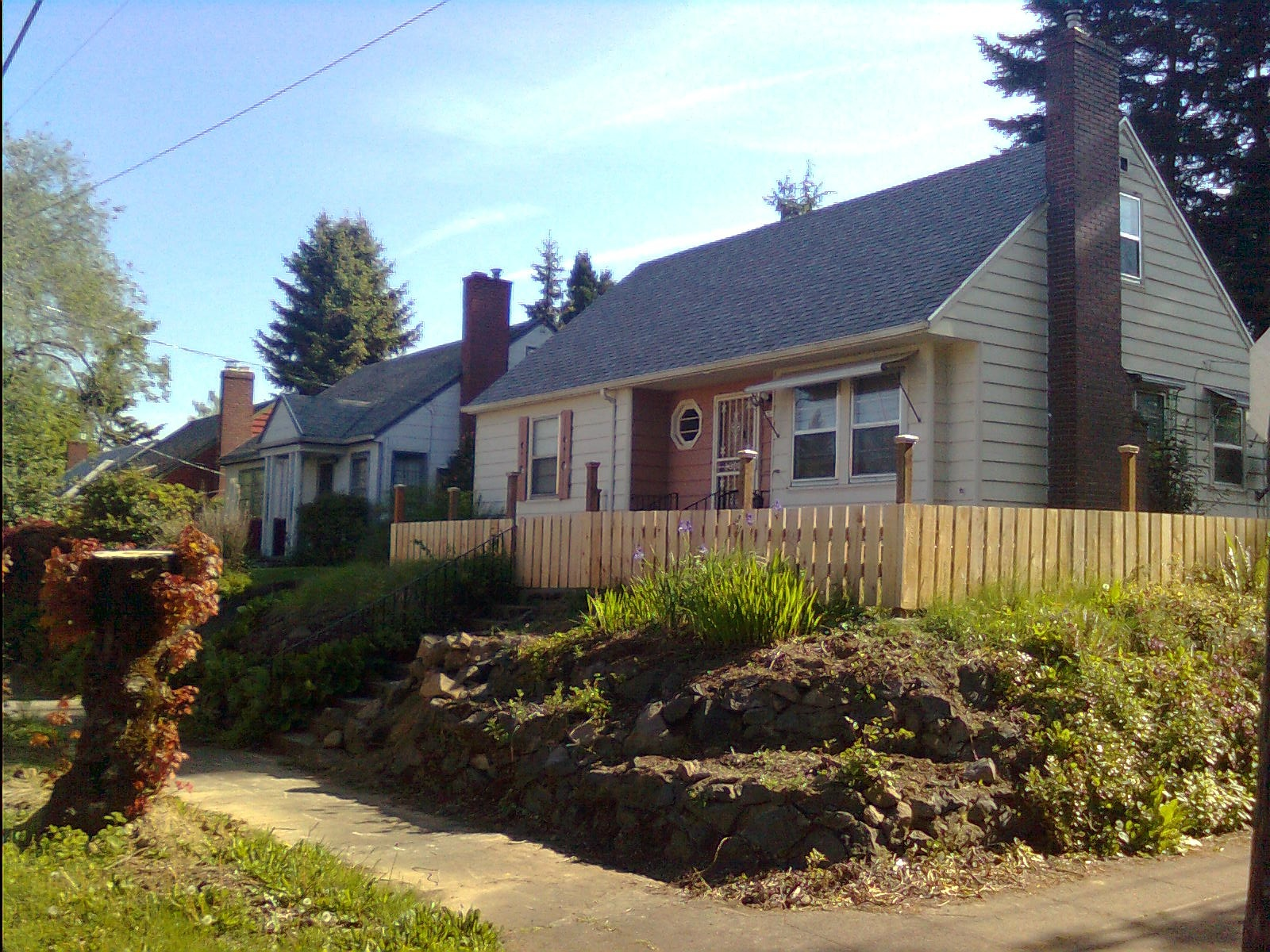
- Location in Portland
- Coordinates: 45°29′17″N 122°37′57″W
- Country: United States
- State: Oregon
- City: Portland

Government
  - Association: Reed Neighborhood Association
  - Coalition: Southeast Uplift

Area
  - Total: 0.43 sq mi (1.11 km^{2})

Population (2000)
  - Total: 3,141
  - Density: 7,330/sq mi (2,830/km^{2})

Housing
  - No. of households: 1648
  - Occupancy rate: 95% occupied
  - Owner-occupied: 596 households (36%)
  - Renting: 1052 households (64%)
  - Avg. household size: 1.91 persons

The Reed neighborhood of Portland, Oregon is in the southeast section of the city, just north of the campus of Reed College. The neighborhood is bounded on the west by railroad tracks, on the north by SE Holgate Ave., on the east by SE 39th Ave., and on the south by SE Reedway, SE Steele, and a line south of SE Insley and SE Harold Ct. Tucker Maxon School is located in the Reed Neighborhood, and the Reed Neighborhood Association sometimes uses the school to hold meetings.

It was the site of Lambert Gardens, replaced by housing in 1968.
