= Markham, Portland, Oregon =

Markham
- Neighborhood
- Interactive map of Markham
- Coordinates: 45°27′29″N 122°42′13″W
- Country: United States
- State: Oregon
- City: Portland

Government
  - Association: Markham Neighborhood Association
  - Coalition: District 4 Coalition

Area
  - Total: 0.52 sq mi (1.34 km^{2})

Population (2000)
  - Total: 2,322
  - Density: 4,490/sq mi (1,730/km^{2})

Housing
  - No. of households: 951
  - Occupancy rate: 96% occupied
  - Owner-occupied: 768 households (81%)
  - Renting: 183 households (19%)
  - Avg. household size: 2.44 persons
- Website: http://markhamneighborhood.com/

Markham is a neighborhood in the Southwest section of Portland, Oregon. Markham is bordered by Multnomah and South Burlingame on the north, Marshall Park on the east, Arnold Creek on the south, and West Portland Park on the west.

Part of Maricara Natural Area (1988) is located in Markham (as well as in Arnold Creek).

== Borders ==
On the south side, Markham is bordered by SW Maricara St., and it continues along on straight line until it reaches SW 25th Ave. Heading north, the border turns left onto SW Lancaster Rd and heads north once more. It then turns right onto SW Taylors Ferry Rd, and heads northeast. After an intersection with SW Spring Garden St, it turns westward, until reaching I-5, where it turns left and heads southwest. The border heads due south above SW 35th Ave and continues along it after briefly being on SW 35th Dr. It continues until SW Maricara St.
