= Homestead, Portland, Oregon =

Homestead
- Neighborhood
- Interactive map of Homestead
- Coordinates: 45°29′45″N 122°41′11″W
- Country: United States
- State: Oregon
- City: Portland

Government
  - Association: Homestead Neighborhood Association
  - Coalition: District 4 Coalition

Area
  - Total: 0.98 sq mi (2.54 km^{2})

Population (2000)
  - Total: 2,556
  - Density: 2,610/sq mi (1,010/km^{2})

Housing
  - No. of households: 1408
  - Occupancy rate: 94% occupied
  - Owner-occupied: 560 households (40%)
  - Renting: 848 households (60%)
  - Avg. household size: 1.82 persons

Homestead is a Southwest Portland, Oregon, United States, neighborhood in the city's West Hills. The neighborhood is home to Marquam Nature Park (SW Marquam St. & Sam Jackson Park Rd.), which offers urban hiking in the form of the Marquam Trail, which one can follow to Downtown. Scenic Terwilliger Boulevard also passes through the neighborhood.

Though primarily residential, the northern portion of the neighborhood includes two regionally important medical complexes on Marquam Hill: the main campus of Oregon Health & Science University, and Portland Veteran Affairs Medical Center. Portland Aerial Tram connects these complexes to the South Waterfront district in the South Portland neighborhood on the Willamette River south of Downtown.

== Schools ==
The neighborhood is served by Ainsworth Elementary School, West Sylvan Middle School, and Lincoln High School.
