= Southwest Portland, Oregon =

Sextant of Portland, Oregon, U.S.

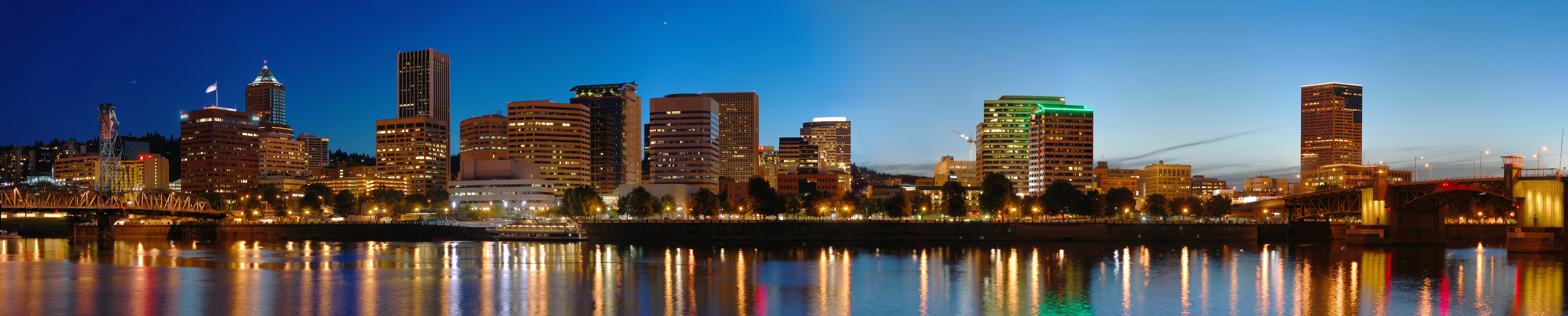
Downtown, in the southwest area of Portland, at night, from the east

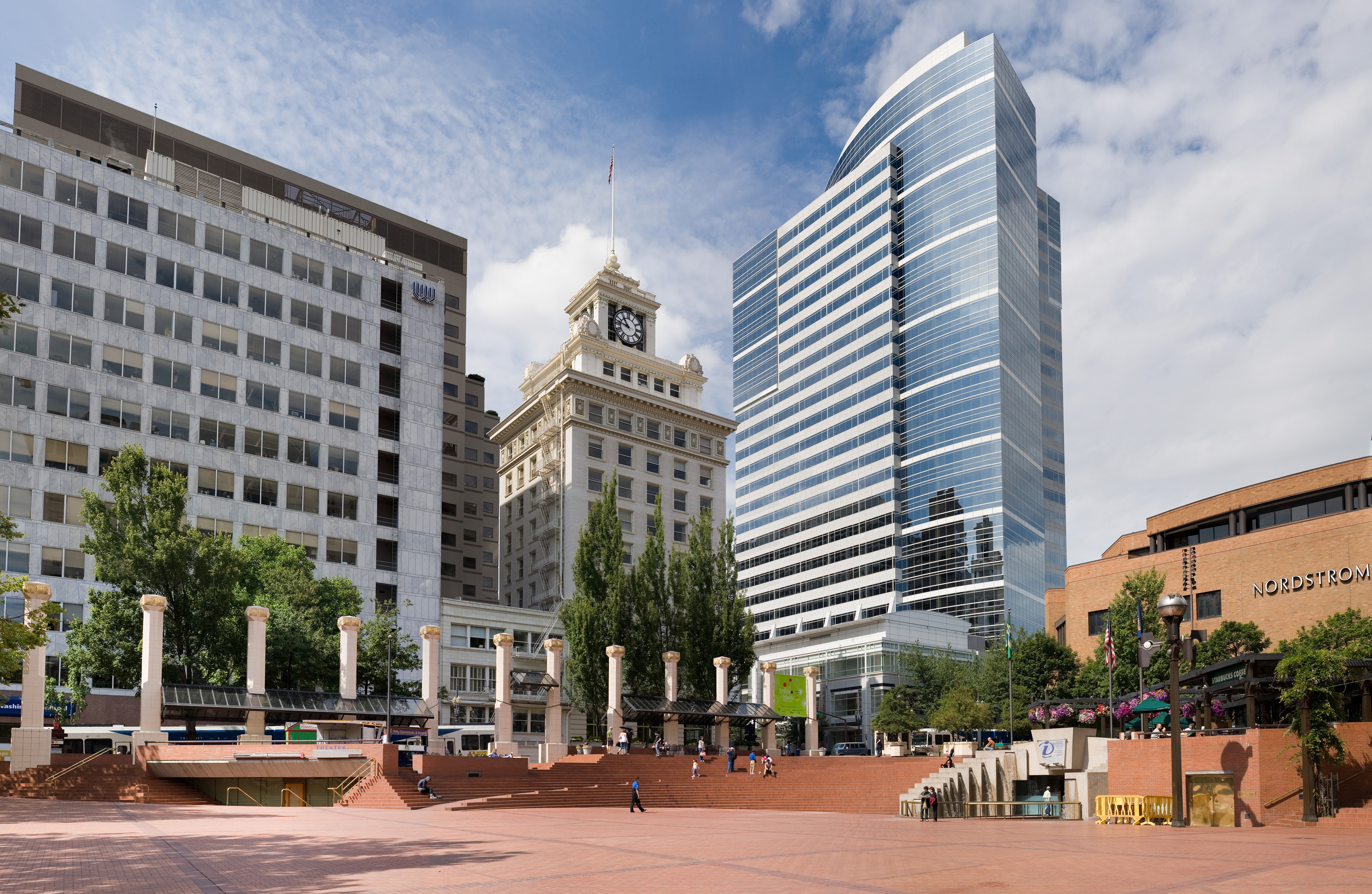
Pioneer Courthouse Square, with Fox Tower in the background

Southwest Portland is one of the sextants of Portland, Oregon.

Downtown Portland lies in the Southwest section between the I-405 freeway loop and the Willamette River, centered on Pioneer Courthouse Square ("Portland's living room"). Downtown and many other parts of inner Portland have compact square blocks (200 ft [60 m] on a side) and narrow streets (64 ft [20 m] wide), a pedestrian-friendly combination.

Many of Portland's recreational, cultural, educational, governmental, business, and retail resources are concentrated downtown, including:

- South Park Blocks, Pettygrove and Lovejoy Fountain Parks, and Tom McCall Waterfront Park
- Arlene Schnitzer Concert Hall, Portland Art Museum, and Oregon Historical Society Museum
- Portland City Hall, Multnomah County Central Courthouse, the Portland Building, Pioneer Courthouse, and Mark O. Hatfield United States Courthouse
- Portland State University, the only public urban university in the state of Oregon that is located in a major metropolitan city
- The Meier & Frank Building and Pioneer Place mall
- Wells Fargo Center, the tallest building in Oregon (546 feet [166 m])

Beyond downtown, the Southwest section also includes:

- The campuses of Oregon Health & Science University (OHSU), Lewis & Clark College, and Portland Community College/Sylvania
- Neighborhoods like South Portland (formerly Corbett-Terwilliger-Lair Hill), South Burlingame, Hillsdale, and Multnomah, with unique residential houses and well-defined commercial and retail districts
- Alpenrose Dairy in the Hayhurst neighborhood, the grounds of which host track cycling and Little League sports
- Washington Park, site of North America's deepest transit station, the Oregon Zoo, Hoyt Arboretum, the International Rose Test Garden, the Portland Japanese Garden, the Vietnam Veterans Memorial, and many hiking trails.
- The south Willamette riverfront along SW Macadam Ave., over 100 acres (0.4 km^{2}) of former industrial land. This area is undergoing redevelopment as a mixed-use, high-density neighborhood, with an anticipated 2,700 residential units and 5,000 high-tech jobs after build-out.

== See also ==
- National Register of Historic Places listings in Southwest Portland, Oregon
- Neighborhoods of Portland, Oregon
