= Multnomah, Portland, Oregon =

Multnomah
- Neighborhood
- Location in Portland
- Coordinates: 45°28′02″N 122°42′46″W
- Country: United States
- State: Oregon
- City: Portland

Government
  - Association: Multnomah Neighborhood Association
  - Coalition: District 4 Coalition

Area
  - Total: 1.44 sq mi (3.74 km^{2})

Population (2000)
  - Total: 6,625
  - Density: 4,590/sq mi (1,770/km^{2})

Housing
  - No. of households: 3196
  - Occupancy rate: 95% occupied
  - Owner-occupied: 1582 households (49%)
  - Renting: 1614 households (51%)
  - Avg. household size: 2.07 persons

Multnomah is a neighborhood in the southwest section of Portland, Oregon, centered on the Multnomah Village business district. The community developed in the 1910s around a depot of the Oregon Electric Railway of the same name. It was annexed by the city of Portland on November 7, 1950.

== Geography ==
Multnomah is bordered by SW 45th Ave. on the west, SW Capitol Hill Road on the east, SW Vermont St. on the north, and I-5 to the south. Adjacent neighborhoods include Maplewood, Ashcreek, and Crestwood to the west; Hayhurst and Hillsdale to the north; and South Burlingame, Markham, and West Portland Park to the south and east.

== History ==
Before Euro-American settlement, the area that would become Multnomah was part of the traditional homelands of Chinookan-speaking peoples, including the Multnomah people, for whom the neighborhood is named. The Multnomah were based primarily on nearby Sauvie Island and the lower Willamette River but were part of a wider network of Indigenous groups that used the surrounding forests, creeks, and prairies for hunting, fishing, and gathering.

By the 19th century, the land around present-day Multnomah had become a heavily forested tract of fir, cedar, and maple trees situated in the ravine- and hill-filled Fanno Creek watershed. It was not distinguished as a place of its own but existed as a wooded and largely undeveloped zone between early settlements in Hillsdale and West Portland Place.

The area's transformation began in 1907 when the Oregon Electric Railway selected a spot for a new station where its rail line would cross an existing rural road (now SW Capitol Highway). Railway planners named the stop "Multnomah" in reference to the Indigenous people of the region, giving the area a lasting identity and catalyzing suburban development around the depot.

The straight alignment of SW Multnomah Boulevard follows the original railway line. In contrast, SW Capitol Highway, initially known as Slavin Road, developed organically based on settlers' needs.

Multnomah thrived in the 1920s but experienced economic hardship during the Great Depression. Passenger rail ceased in 1933, and freight stopped in 1945, after which the railway path became Multnomah Boulevard. Portland annexed Multnomah in 1950, bringing municipal services to the community.

The neighborhood saw revitalization starting in the 1970s with antique shops and local businesses occupying historic buildings, forming today's vibrant pedestrian-friendly village.

A notable historical event occurred on April 7, 1987, when Mayor Bud Clark fired Police Chief Jim Davis at Fat City Cafe.

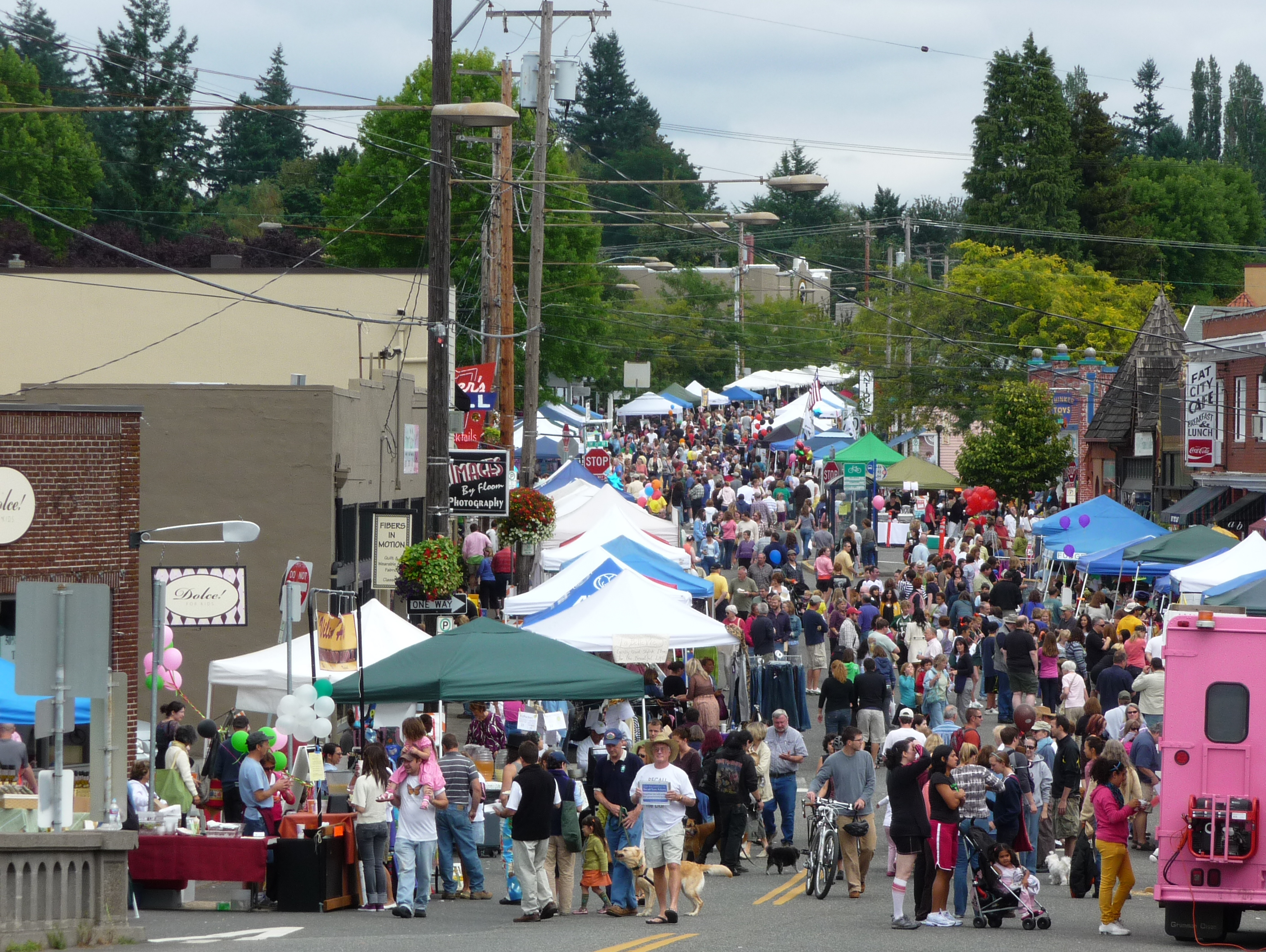
The street fair in Multnomah Village during Multnomah Days 2009. Looking northeast down SW Capitol Highway from its bridge over SW Multnomah Blvd.

The neighborhood annually celebrates "Multnomah Days" each August with a parade and street festival.

== Historic buildings ==
- The Multnomah School (1913) has, since 1979, served as the Multnomah Art Center.
- The Nelson Thomas building (1913) now houses Marco's Cafe.
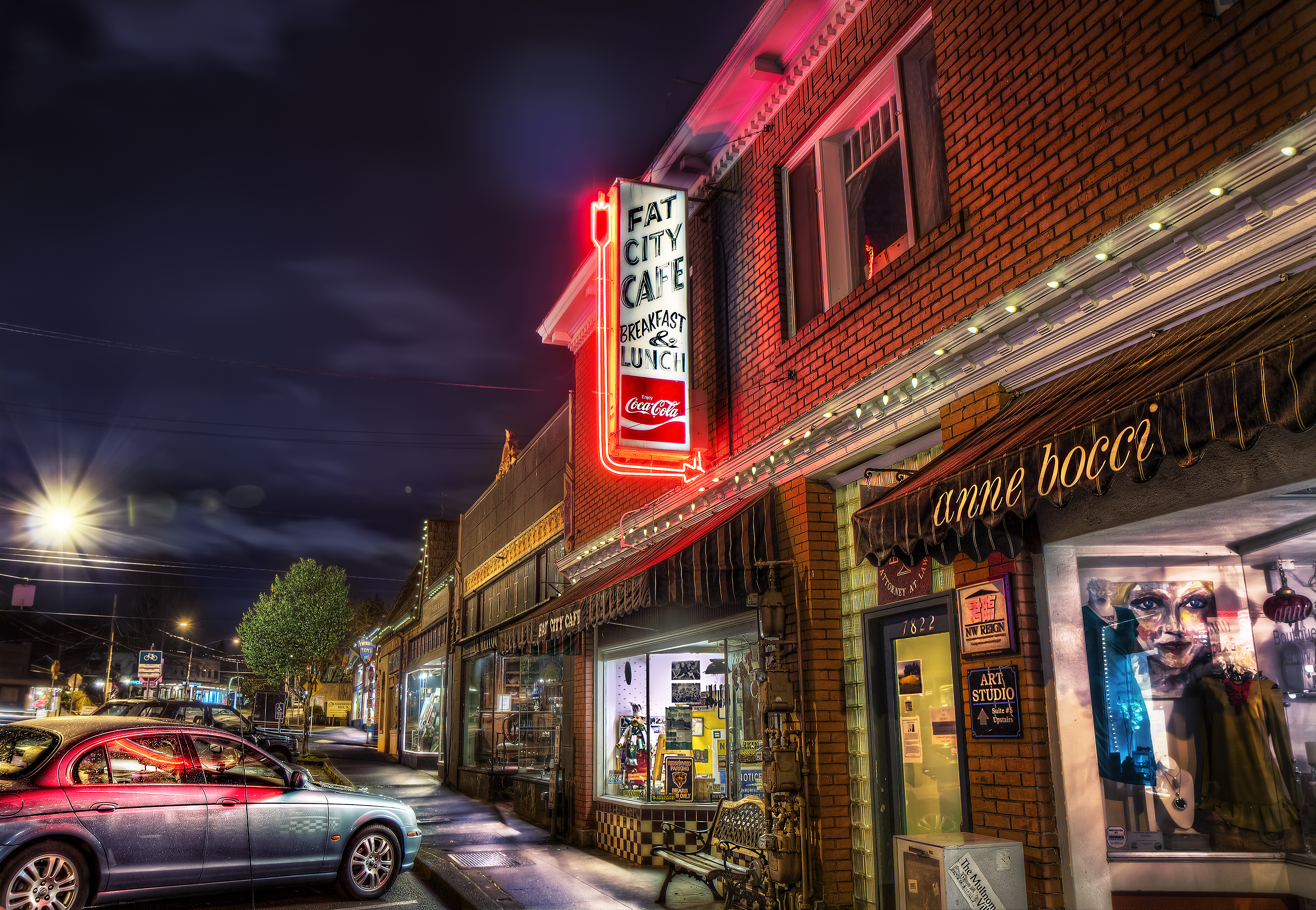
- Fat City Cafe, Multnomah Village, Portland, Oregon.
  The 1925 Masonic Lodge (Orenomah Chapter No. 141) is now the Lucky Labrador Public House.

== Parks ==
- Gabriel Park (1950)
- Scht Wiwnu Park (1954), formerly A Park, which was previously Custer Park, renamed in March 2026
- Spring Garden Park (1999)
- Texas HydroPark
