= South Burlingame, Portland, Oregon =

South Burlingame
- Neighborhood
- Location in Portland
- Coordinates: 45°27′58″N 122°41′06″W
- Country: United States
- State: Oregon
- City: Portland

Government
  - Association: South Burlingame Neighborhood Association

Area
  - Total: 0.42 sq mi (1.10 km^{2})

Population (2000)
  - Total: 1,279
  - Density: 3,010/sq mi (1,160/km^{2})

Housing
  - No. of households: 614
  - Occupancy rate: 95% occupied
  - Owner-occupied: 481 households (78%)
  - Renting: 133 households (22%)
  - Avg. household size: 2.08 persons

South Burlingame is a neighborhood in the Southwest section of Portland, Oregon. It is bordered by Multnomah to the west, Hillsdale and South Portland to the north, the River View Cemetery to the east, and Markham, Marshall Park, and Collins View to the south.

Interstate 5 cuts through the northern part of the neighborhood, separating the Fulton Park area from the rest of South Burlingame.

== History ==
South Burlingame was formed on June 7, 1910 when B.M. Lombard, in partnership with Fulton Park Land Company, recorded a replat to a 272-acre (1.10 km^{2}) section of land that was, at the time, a part of the Fulton Park District.

The original Fulton Park District was 411 acres (1.66 km^{2}), and was formed on July 20, 1888 when Philip A. Marquam sold the land to the South West Portland Company for $150,000. It included the present-day South Burlingame neighborhood as well as an eight-block corridor of land that follows Terwilliger Boulevard north from Interstate 5 to Capital Highway.

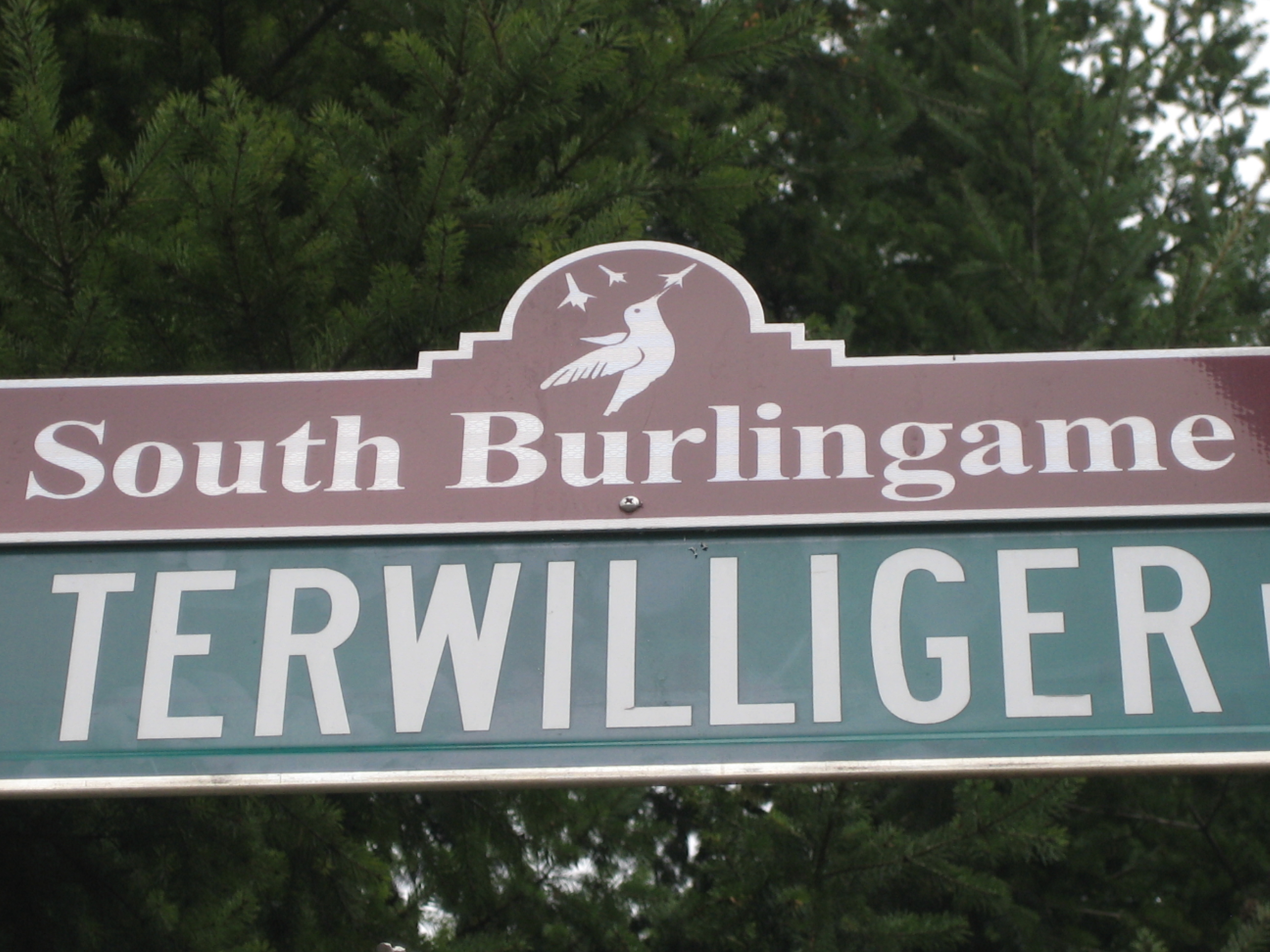

Prior to 1888, the original land was part of the Thomas F. Stephens donation land claim and was purchased from him in two separate transactions in 1858 and 1868.

== Parks ==
- Burlingame Park (1949)
- Fulton Park (1941), including Fulton Park Community Center (built 1914 as an elementary school, acquired by Portland Parks and Recreation in 1958) and Fulton Community Garden and Display Garden (1974)
