= Crestwood, Portland, Oregon =

Crestwood
- Neighborhood
- Interactive map of Crestwood
- Coordinates: 45°27′17″N 122°43′35″W
- Country: United States
- State: Oregon
- City: Portland

Government
  - Association: Crestwood Neighborhood Association
  - Coalition: District 4 Coalition

Area
  - Total: 0.63 sq mi (1.6 km^{2})

Population (2020)
  - Total: 2,575
  - Density: 4,087/sq mi (1,578/km^{2})

Housing
  - No. of households: 992
  - Occupancy rate: 96.9% occupied
  - Owner-occupied: 350 households (82%)
  - Renting: 77 households (18%)
  - Avg. household size: 2.6 persons

Crestwood is a neighborhood in the Southwest section of Portland, Oregon located between SW 45th Ave. and Barbur Blvd., adjacent to Multnomah and Ashcreek. Woods Memorial Natural Area is located here, a swath of urban wilderness visited on occasion by elk, as well as Dickinson Park.

== Demographics ==
In 2020, 2,575 people lived in Crestwood, up 130% from 1,120 in 2010. 77% of people identified as white, 6.8% as Black or African American, 6.2% as Asian, 2.1% as American Indian or Alaska Native, 0.5% as Native Hawaiian or Pacific Islander, and 8.0% as some other race. 8.5% identified as Hispanic or Latino (any race). The median age in Crestwood was 40.9. The median household income was listed at $121,000 and 38% of the neighborhood was covered by tree canopy. 77% of eligible residents voted in the 2020 general election.
