= Southwest Hills, Portland, Oregon =

Southwest Hills
- Neighborhood
- Location in Portland
- Coordinates: 45°30′20″N 122°42′11″W
- Country: United States
- State: Oregon
- City: Portland

Government
  - Association: Southwest Hills Residential League
  - Coalition: District 4 Coalition

Area
  - Total: 2.05 sq mi (5.30 km^{2})

Population (2000)
  - Total: 4,673
  - Density: 2,280/sq mi (882/km^{2})

Housing
  - No. of households: 1992
  - Occupancy rate: 94% occupied
  - Owner-occupied: 1683 households (84%)
  - Renting: 309 households (16%)
  - Avg. household size: 2.35 persons

Southwest Hills is a neighborhood in the West Hills (Tualatin Mountains) in the southwest section of Portland, Oregon, United States. The northeastern part of the neighborhood, above Goose Hollow and Downtown Portland, is known as Portland Heights. Much of the western portion of the neighborhood lies outside the Portland city limits, in unincorporated Multnomah County.

== Parks ==
- Council Crest Park - SW Council Crest Dr.
- Governors Park - SW 13th Ave & Davenport St.
- Marquam Nature Park - SW Marquam St & Sam Jackson Park Rd.
- Norris House & Property - 4455 SW Terwilliger Blvd.
- Portland Heights Park - SW Patton Rd. & Old Orchard Rd.

== Coordinates ==
- Portland Heights is located at 45.5056737°N 122.7031520°W
- Council Crest is located at 45.499007°N 122.705652°W
