= Cathedral Park (Portland, Oregon) =

Public park in Portland, Oregon, U.S.

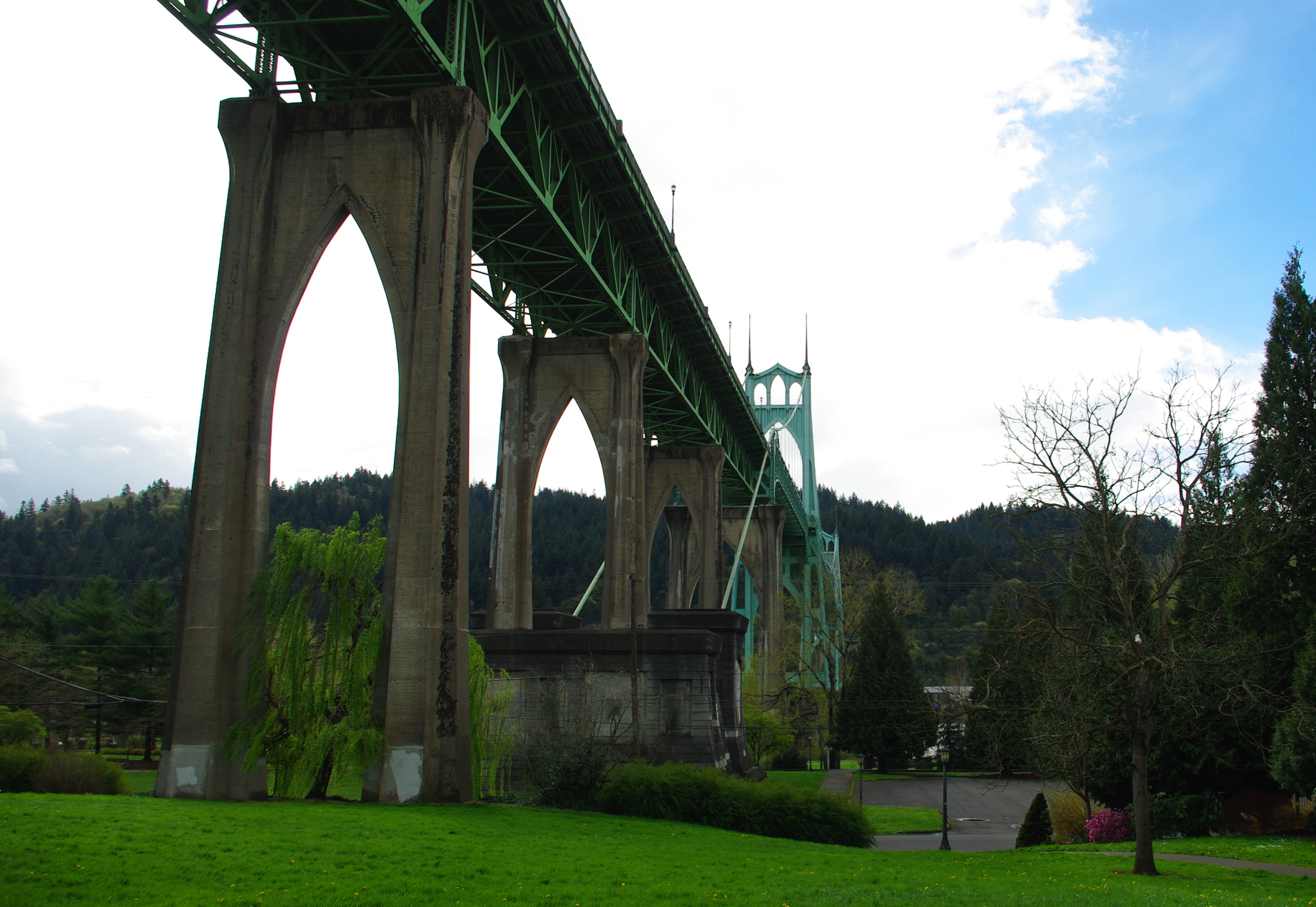
- St. Johns Bridge and grassy area of Cathedral Park
- Interactive map of Cathedral Park
- Location: N Edison Street & Pittsburg Avenue; Portland, Oregon
- Coordinates: 45.5883°N 122.75799°W
- Area: 23.31 acres (9.43 ha)
- Created: 1968
- Operator: Portland Parks & Recreation
- Status: Open 5 a.m. to midnight daily

Cathedral Park is a city park in the eponymous neighborhood of northern Portland, Oregon, on the east shore of the Willamette River. The park is situated under the St. Johns Bridge, and was given its name due to the pointed arches that support the bridge, which resemble those in Gothic cathedrals.

== History ==
The land the park occupies was originally part of the city of St. Johns. The St. Johns Bridge opened in 1931, but at that time there was no park. In August 1949, a fifteen-year-old girl named Thelma Taylor was kidnapped and murdered under the bridge in the space where the park now exists. According to local folklore, due to this, the park is supposedly haunted. In 1968, the city acquired the land under the bridge, which became a dumping ground. Residents then raised $7.5 million in the 1970s to build a park on the site, which opened on May 3, 1980. A sculpture by Donald Fels was added to the park in 2008, entitled "Drawing on the River". In August 2013, the amphitheater hosted the final "Trek in the Park" performance put on by the Atomic Arts group. The boat ramp was used as a staging area for protests in 2015 against the MSV Fennica, an icebreaker used by Shell Oil.

== Recreation ==
The park contains several walking trails, picnic benches, as well as a floating dock that extends onto the Willamette River. It also is home to a small outdoor stage, where the city has held an annual summer jazz festival since 1980. The Cathedral Park Jazz Festival is the oldest free jazz festival west of the Mississippi River. Cathedral Park also contains a boat ramp on the north end of the park. It is considered a popular location for weddings. In 2021, Human Access Project (HAP) led an effort to remove 25 tons of concrete and rubble from the river's edge of Cathedral Park with help from partners and volunteers. In 2022, HAP and Portland Parks & Recreation designated six safer swimming areas on the Willamette River: Audrey McCall Beach, Cathedral Park Beach, Kevin Duckworth Memorial Dock, Poet's Beach, Sellwood Riverfront ParkBeach, and Tom McCall Bowl Beach. In 2013, HAP partnered with Green Anchors, other partner organizations and 200+ volunteers to remove 100 tons of concrete and rock from the south end of Cathedral Park Beach.

June 29, 2024 HAP held its first “Cathedral Park Riverfest” in celebration of the installation of a new swimming and fishing dock at Cathedral Park. HAP said it will hopefully start a new era where the public uses the park to recreate in the Willamette River.

Located just under the Cathedral Bridge in the St. Johns neighborhood, the dock is the culmination of years of efforts to increase access to the water for one of the more industrial parts of the city.

The cleanup has been years in the making, Levenson says. Volunteers got rid of about 25 tons of strewn concrete in 2021. Another 150 volunteers and some heavy equipment moved out another 125 tons in 2023 as plans came together for the new dock, part of a partnership involving Portland Parks & Recreation and HAP's $300,000 grant through the American Rescue Plan Act (ARPA).

The Cathedral Park beach had long been uninviting to swimmers, both because of the aging dock and piles of concrete along the shore which was removed by HAP between 2021 and 2023.

== See also ==
- List of parks in Portland, Oregon
- Reportedly haunted locations in Oregon
