= Downtown Portland =

Downtown
- Neighborhood
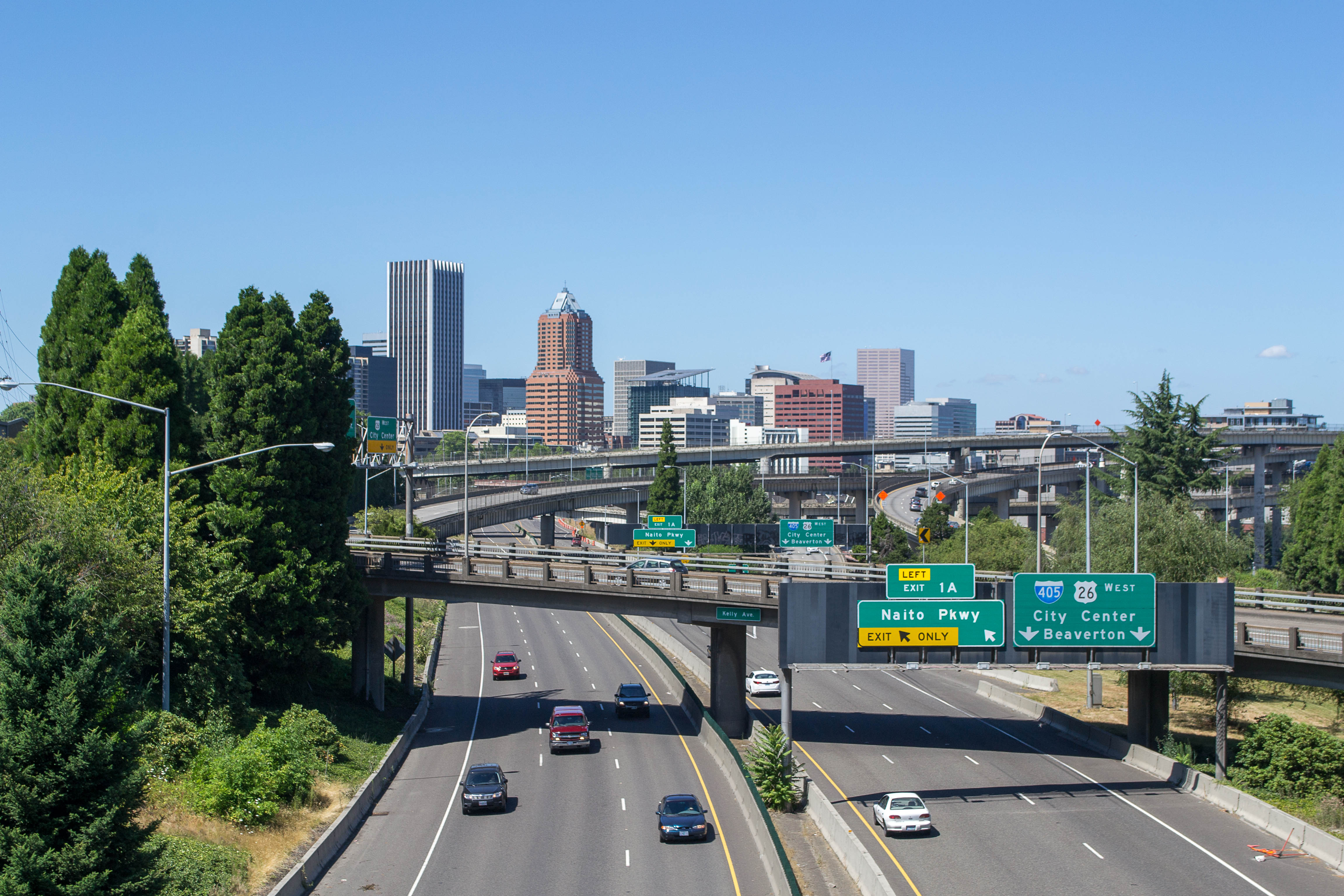
- Downtown Portland, viewed from over Interstate 5
- Interactive map of Downtown
- Coordinates: 45°31′10″N 122°40′47″W
- Country: United States
- State: Oregon
- City: Portland

Government
  - Association: Downtown Neighborhood Association

Area
  - Total: 1.00 sq mi (2.58 km^{2})

Population (2010)
  - Total: 12,801
  - Density: 12,900/sq mi (4,960/km^{2})

Housing
  - No. of households: 8,353
  - Occupancy rate: 87% occupied
  - Owner-occupied: 1,099 households (13%)
  - Renting: 6,171 households (74%)
  - Avg. household size: 1.53 persons

Downtown Portland is the central business district of Portland, Oregon, United States. It is on the west bank of the Willamette River in the northeastern corner of the southwest section of the city and where most of the city's high-rise buildings are found.

The downtown neighborhood extends west from the Willamette to Interstate 405 and south from Burnside Street to just south of the Portland State University campus (also bounded by I-405), except for a part of northeastern portion north of SW Harvey Milk Street and east of SW 3rd Ave that belongs to the Old Town Chinatown neighborhood. High-density business and residential districts near downtown include the Lloyd District, across the river from the northern part of downtown, and the South Waterfront area, just south of downtown in the South Portland neighborhood.

Portland's downtown features narrow streets—64 feet (20 m) wide—and square, compact blocks 200 feet (61 m) on a side, to create more corner lots that were expected to be more valuable. The small blocks also made downtown Portland pleasant to walk through. The 264-foot (80 m) long combined blocks divide one mile (1.6 km) of road into exactly 20 separate blocks.

By comparison, Seattle's blocks are 240 by 320 feet (73 m × 98 m), and Manhattan's east–west streets are divided into blocks that are from 600–800 feet (183–244 m) long.

== Urban development ==
=== 1900s ===
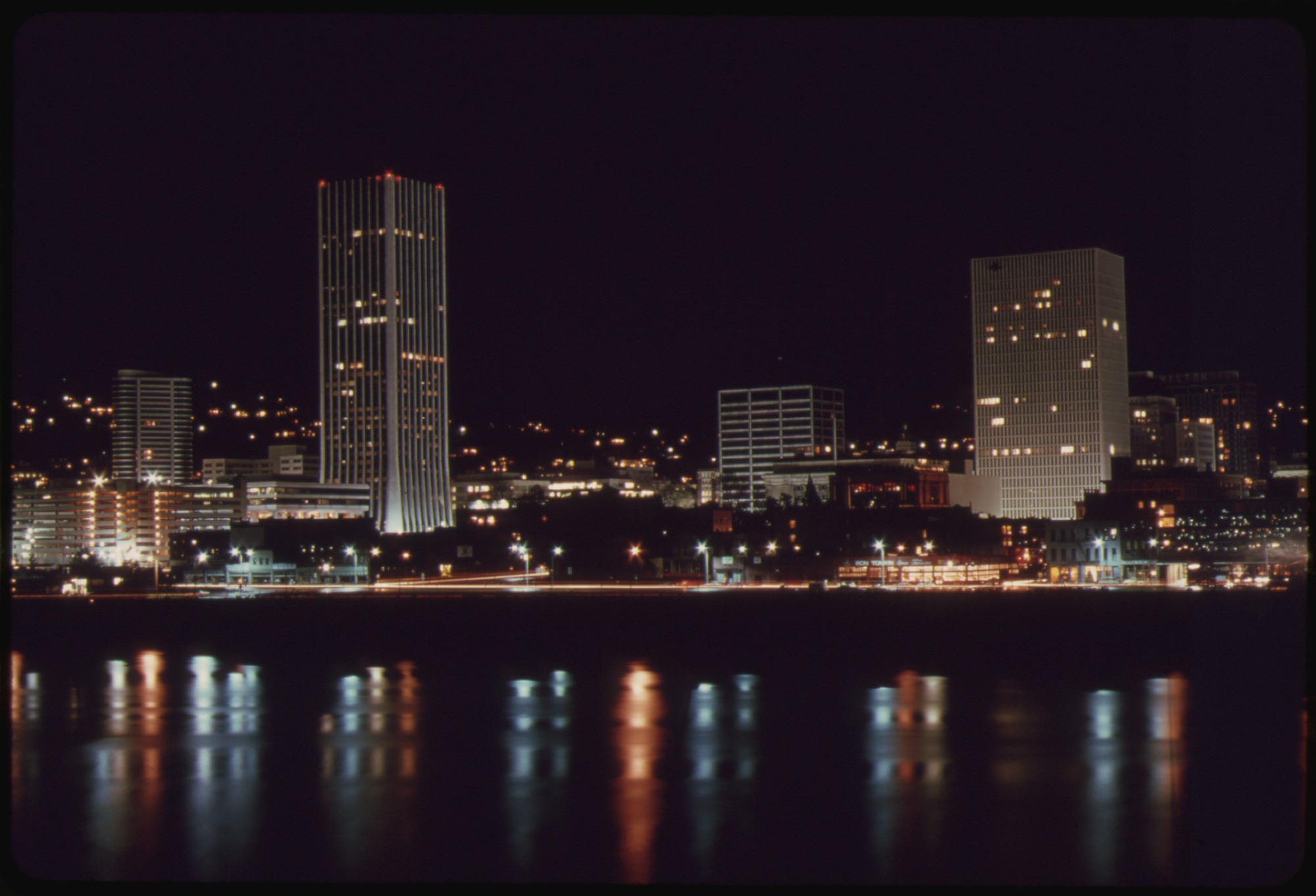
Downtown Portland in 1973

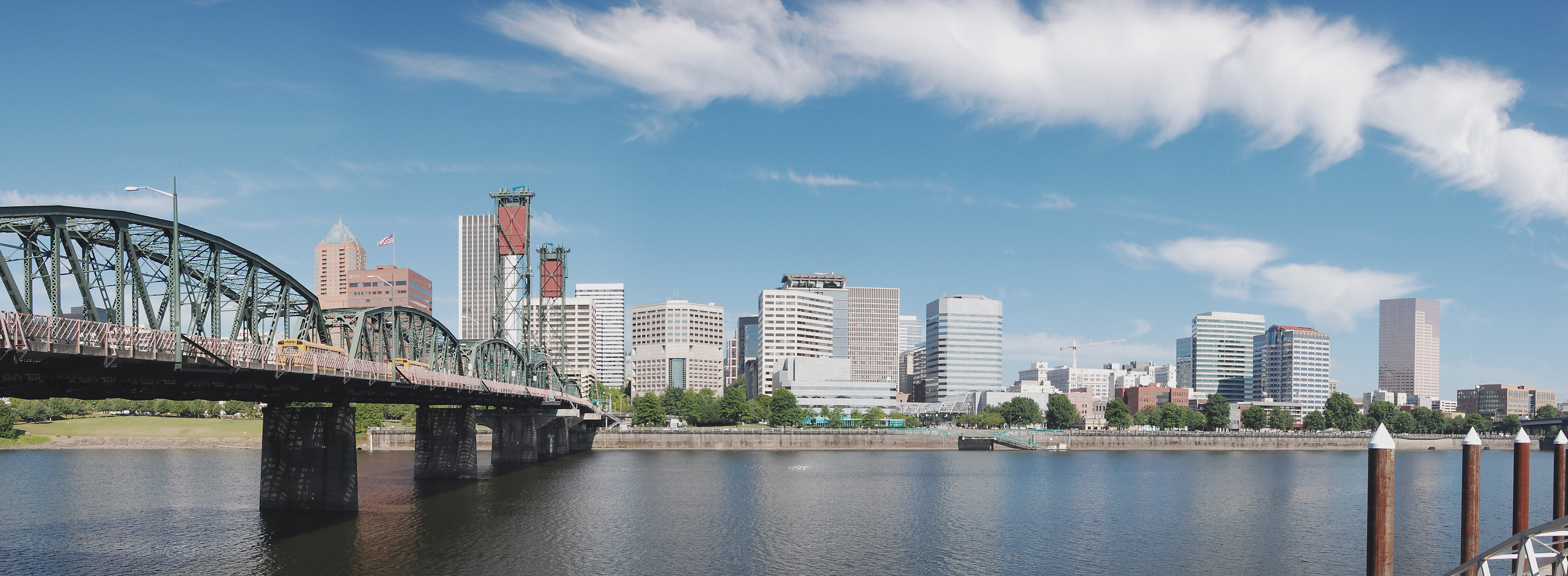
Downtown Portland in 2007

By the early 1970s, parts of Portland's central city had been in decay for some time. New suburban shopping malls in the neighboring cities of Beaverton, Tigard, and Gresham competed with downtown for people and money. Unlike many downtown revitalization efforts around the United States at this time, Portland's plan did not call for widespread demolition and reconstruction. Robert Moses, the designer of New York City's gridded freeways, expressways, and bridges, designed a plan to revitalize downtown Portland. Moses charted a highway loop around the city's central freeways, which would become Interstate 405 as it links with I-5 south of downtown.

Additionally the creation of a downtown transit mall in 1977, a new waterfront park in 1978 (later named after Governor Tom McCall) in place of a freeway, the creation of the Pioneer Courthouse Square in 1984, the opening of the Portland–Gresham light rail line in 1986, and the opening of Pioneer Place mall in 1990 successfully drew or retained businesses and lured customers. After 1990, downtown Portland dominated the city's development, with 500,000 square feet (46,000 m^{2}) more development there than on the east side (Lloyd District, Central Eastside Industrial District, and Lower Albina).

=== 2000s ===
Downtown Portland has many surface parking lots, which the city is attempting to reduce in order to promote higher density, create storefronts, and make downtown more vibrant. Some changes are being made slowly, such as the creation of the Smart Park garage system, and conversion of a surface-level parking lot into a park with underground parking at Park Block 5 between the Fox Tower and Park Avenue West Tower.

In 2017, Human Access Project partnered with Portland Parks & Recreation to open the city's first officially recognized public swimming beach, Poet's Beach.

In 2020 and 2021, during the COVID-19 pandemic, Downtown Portland faced an increase in homeless camps and a reduction in office workers due to remote work. During and after the Black Lives Matter protests, there was an increase in graffiti, property damage, and windows being boarded up.

== Bridges ==
Portland is sometimes known as "Bridgetown", due to the number of bridges that cross its two rivers. There are nine bridges entering downtown and immediately adjacent areas. The bridges are (north to south):

- Fremont Bridge, carrying I-405 past the Pearl and Northwest districts and into downtown
- Broadway Bridge, connecting the Lloyd District to the Pearl District and carrying the Portland Streetcar's east-side line
- Steel Bridge, the only double-deck bridge with independent lifts in the world, and carrying MAX Light Rail and Amtrak into Old Town Chinatown
- Burnside Bridge, connecting the east side to downtown and the Old Town Chinatown neighborhood
- Morrison Bridge, leading directly into the central business district from the east side
- Hawthorne Bridge, Portland's oldest highway bridge and, leading directly into the central business district from the east side; Oregon's most heavily used bridge for bicycles
- Marquam Bridge, a two-deck bridge carrying I-5 traffic
- Tilikum Crossing, Portland's newest bridge, limited to public transit, bicycles, pedestrians, and emergency vehicles
- Ross Island Bridge, which connects U.S. Route 26 (SE Powell Blvd.) to the South Waterfront

Outside the downtown area there are three other road bridges within Portland limits that cross the Willamette River: the St. Johns Bridge and Sauvie Island Bridge (to the north) and the Sellwood Bridge (to the south).

== Transportation ==
Most streets in downtown Portland are one-way. Naito Parkway (two-way, formerly known as Front Avenue) is the farthest east, while most of the high-rises end by I-405 to the west. Interstate 5 runs on the opposite bank of the river, crossing over on the Marquam Bridge. U.S. Route 26 connects downtown Portland to the Oregon Coast and the Cascade Range.

Downtown is also served by several forms of public transportation. TriMet, the regional mass transit agency, operates MAX light rail on two alignments in downtown, one running east–west on Yamhill and Morrison streets and north–south on 1st Avenue, the other running north–south on 5th and 6th avenues. On the latter two streets, an extensive transit mall—known as the Portland Mall—limits private vehicles and provides connections between more than fifty bus lines, MAX light rail, and the Portland Streetcar.

The southern part of downtown and the West End are also served by the Portland Streetcar system, operating from South Waterfront north into the Pearl and Northwest Portland districts. The system currently has two routes, measuring 7.2 miles (11.6 km) end to end, and connects in South Waterfront with the Tram (aerial cableway) to Oregon Health & Science University (OHSU).

Starting in 1975 and continuing for almost four decades, all transit service in downtown was free, as downtown was entirely within TriMet's Fareless Square, which also covered a portion of the nearby Lloyd District after 2001. However, in 2010, free rides became limited to MAX and streetcar service – no longer covering bus service – and the zone renamed the "Free Rail Zone", and in September 2012 the fareless zone was discontinued entirely, because of a $12 million shortfall in TriMet's annual budget.

Street Sign Toppers in Downtown

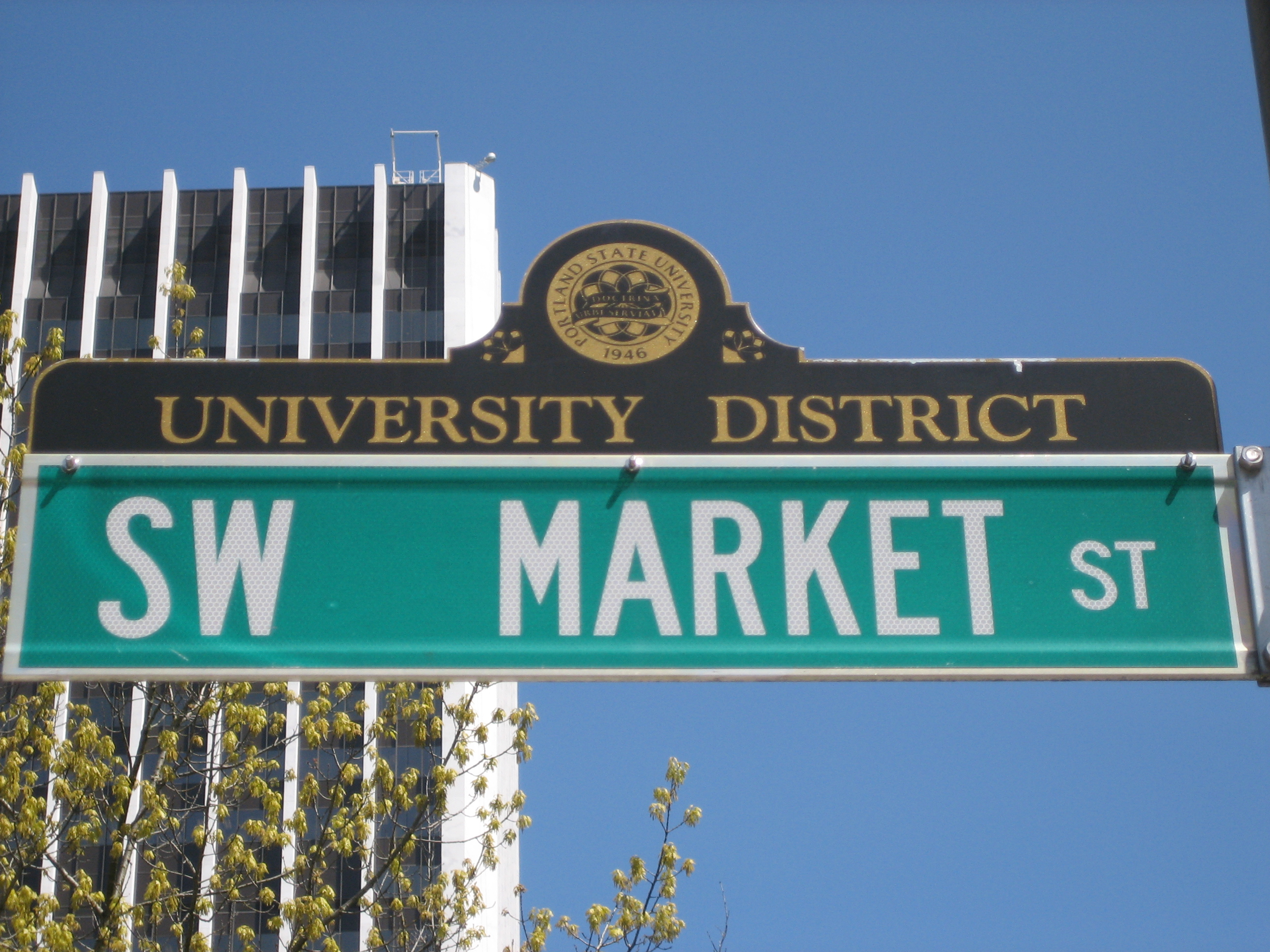
Portland State University District in the south part of Downtown

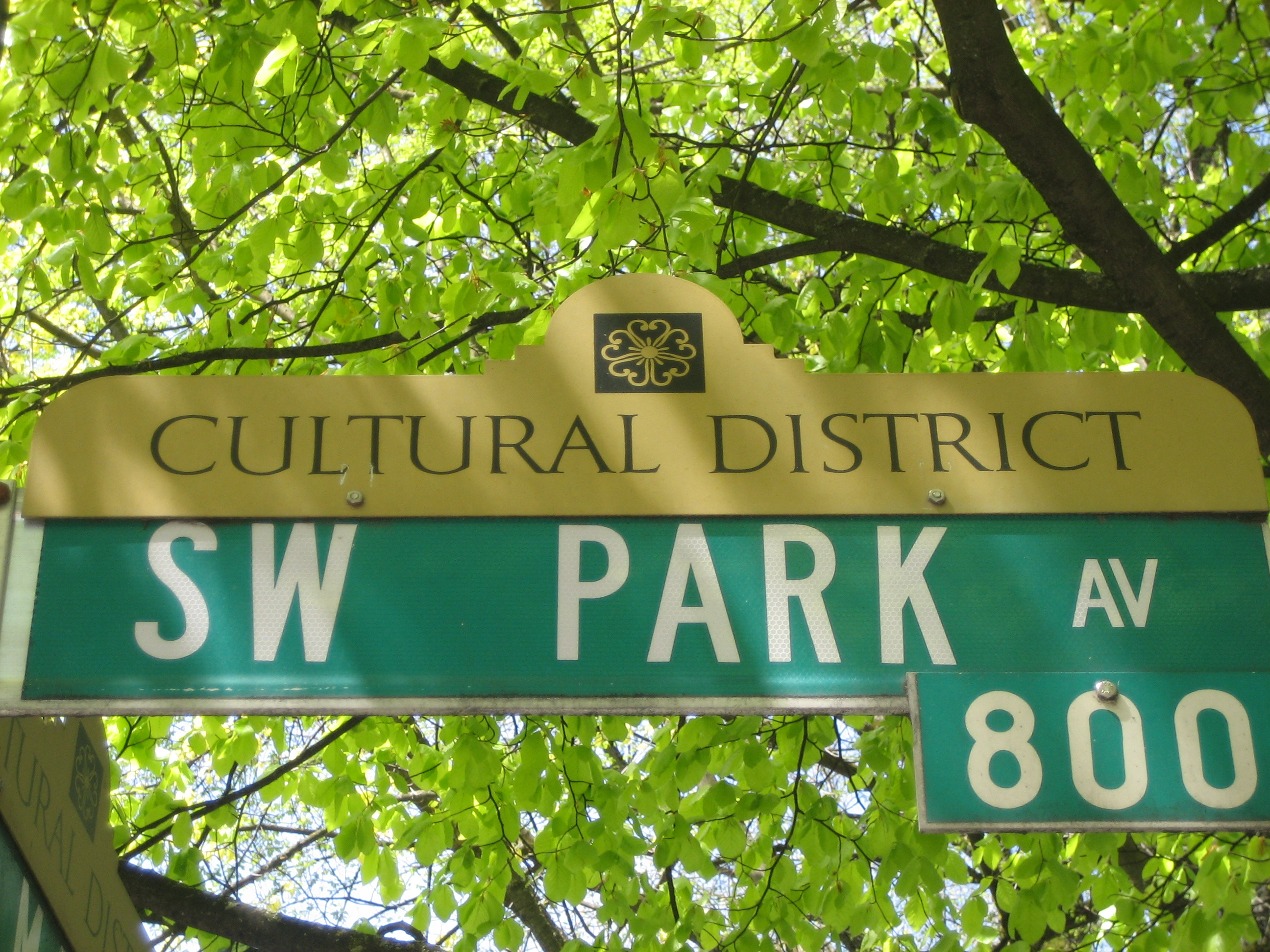
Cultural District along the South Park Blocks in Downtown

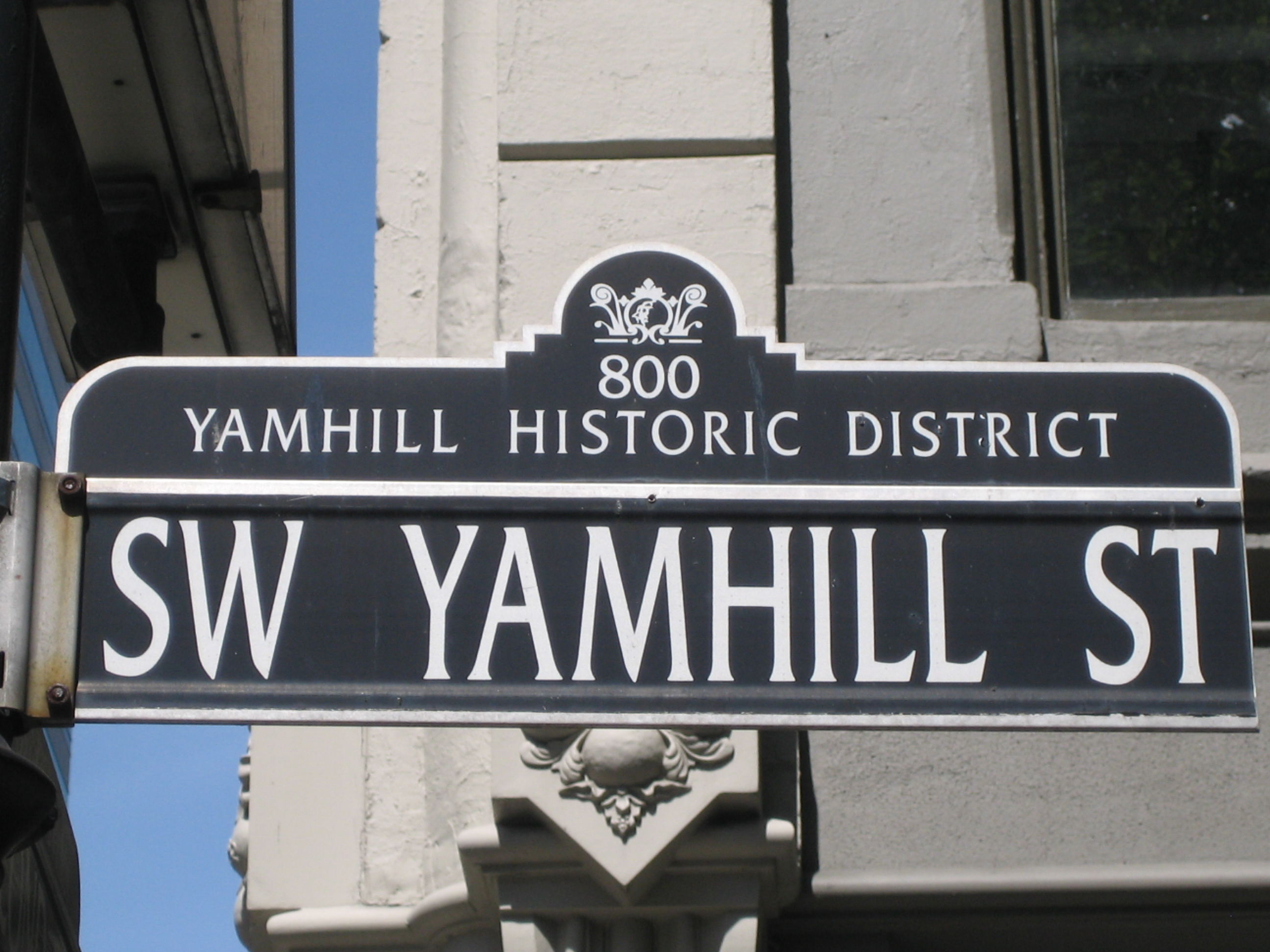
Yamhill Historic District in Downtown

== Sites of interest ==
- Pioneer Courthouse Square
- Arlene Schnitzer Concert Hall
- Portland Art Museum
- Portland State University
- Oregon Historical Society
- Tom McCall Waterfront Park

=== Buildings ===
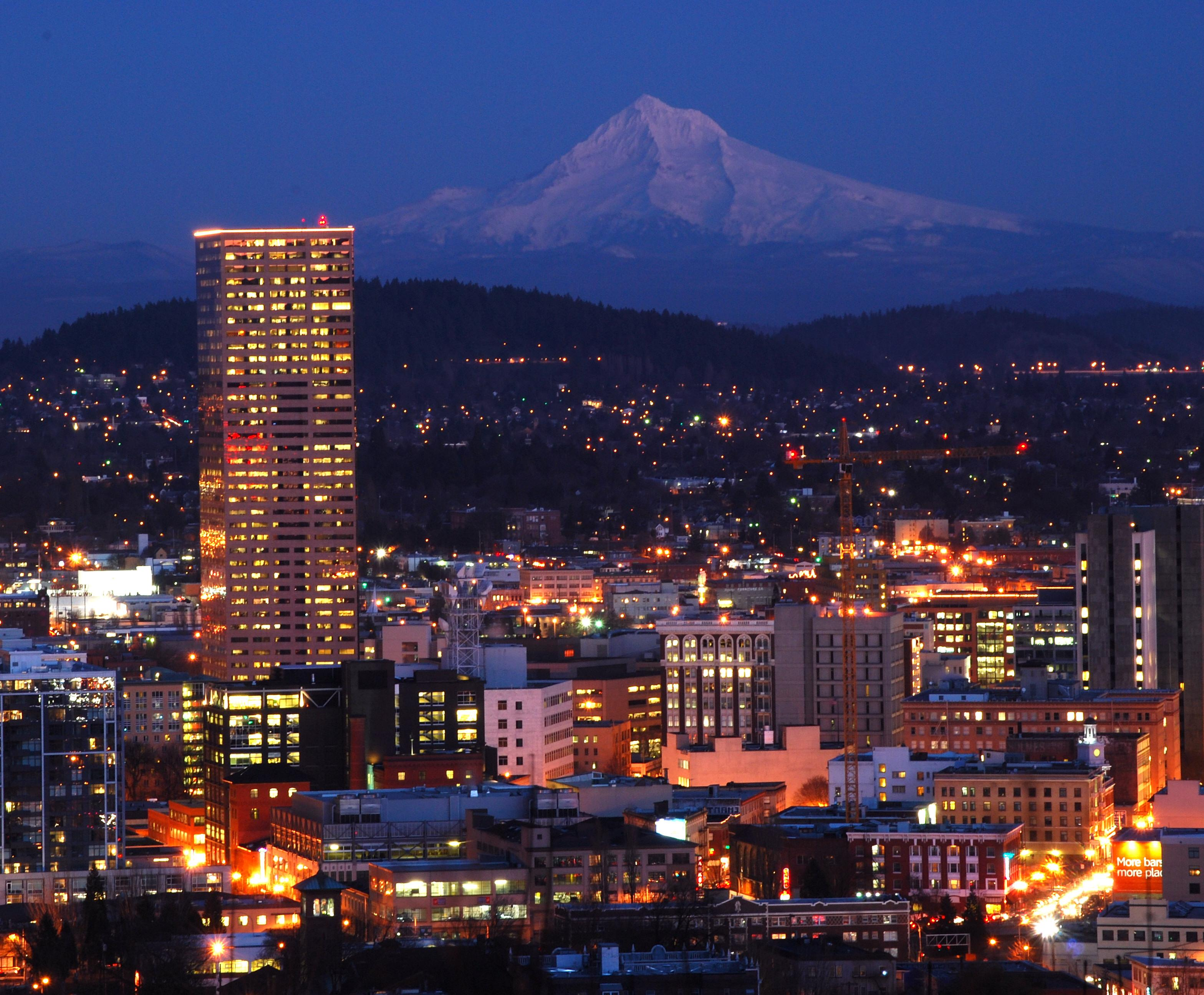
The U.S. Bancorp Tower, with Mount Hood in the background

Several high-rise buildings are located in downtown Portland. The five tallest are:

- Wells Fargo Center: rises to 166 meters (546 feet) and was constructed in 1972
- U.S. Bancorp Tower: rises to 163 meters (536 feet) and was constructed in 1983
- KOIN Center: rises to 155 meters (509 feet) and was constructed in 1984
- Park Avenue West Tower: rises to 153 meters (502 feet) and was constructed in 2016
- PacWest Center: rises to 127 meters (418 feet) and was constructed in 1984

== Adjacent districts ==
- Old Town Chinatown – northeast, and extending south of West Burnside St. near the river
- Pearl District – north, adjacent to Chinatown
- Goose Hollow – residential, west of PSU, north of US 26
- Southwest Hills – residential, west of PSU, south of US 26
- Marquam Hill (colloquially "Pill Hill") – south, including OHSU and the Veteran's Hospital
- RiverPlace – at southeast corner of downtown
- South Waterfront – south of downtown, east of Interstate 5

== See also ==
- Mount Hood Freeway
- Portland, Oregon neighborhoods
