= Cathedral Park =

Cathedral Park may refer to:

- Cathedral Park, Philadelphia, a neighborhood
- Cathedral Park, Portland, Oregon, a neighborhood
  - Cathedral Park (Portland, Oregon), a park for which the neighborhood is named
- Cathedral Provincial Park and Protected Area, British Columbia, Canada
- Cathedral Park, Timișoara, a park in Timișoara, Romania
- Cathedral Grove, MacMillan Provincial Park, British Columbia, Canada
