= Big Float =

Defunct annual event in Portland, Oregon, U.S.

The Big Float

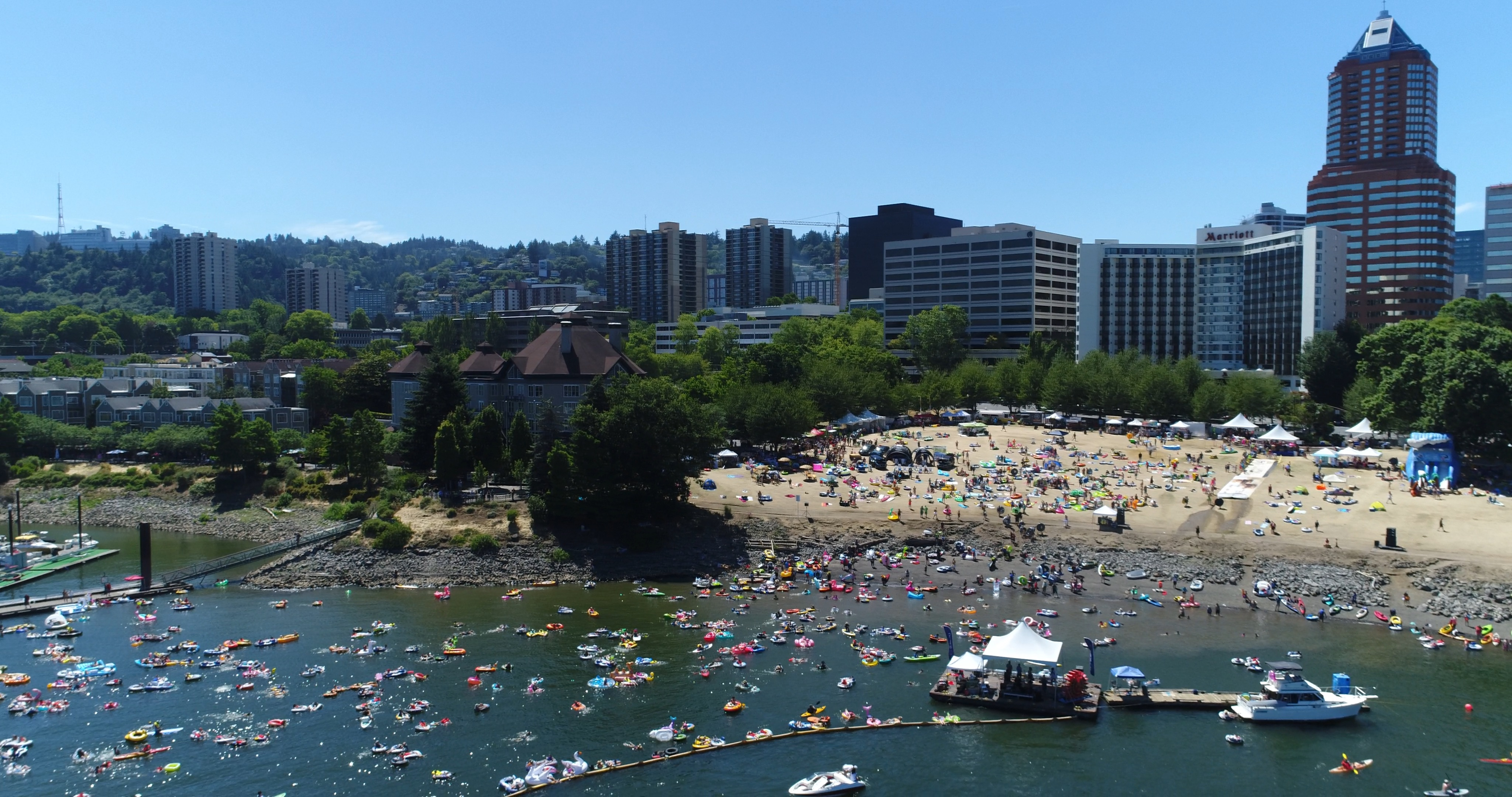
- Genre: Event
- Frequency: Annually
- Location: Portland, Oregon
- Country: United States
- Established: 2011
- Previous event: July 10, 2022
- Participants: 5,000 (2022)
- Organiser: Human Access Project
- Website: thebigfloat.com

The Big Float was an annual July celebration of the Willamette River in Portland, Oregon, United States. Established in 2011, as a benefit for the Human Access Project, attendees formed a giant people-powered flotilla and beach party to encourage Portlanders to reclaim the Willamette River for swimming and other aquatic recreation.

== Description ==
The float took approximately 45–60 minutes to complete. The event kicked off with the River Hugger Swim Team swimming across the river, followed by an inner-tube parade from Tom McCall Bowl Beach at Waterfront Park, along the esplanade, to Poet's Beach. Participants then floated back to Tom McCall Bowl Beach, passing two floating band stages to an after party.

== History ==
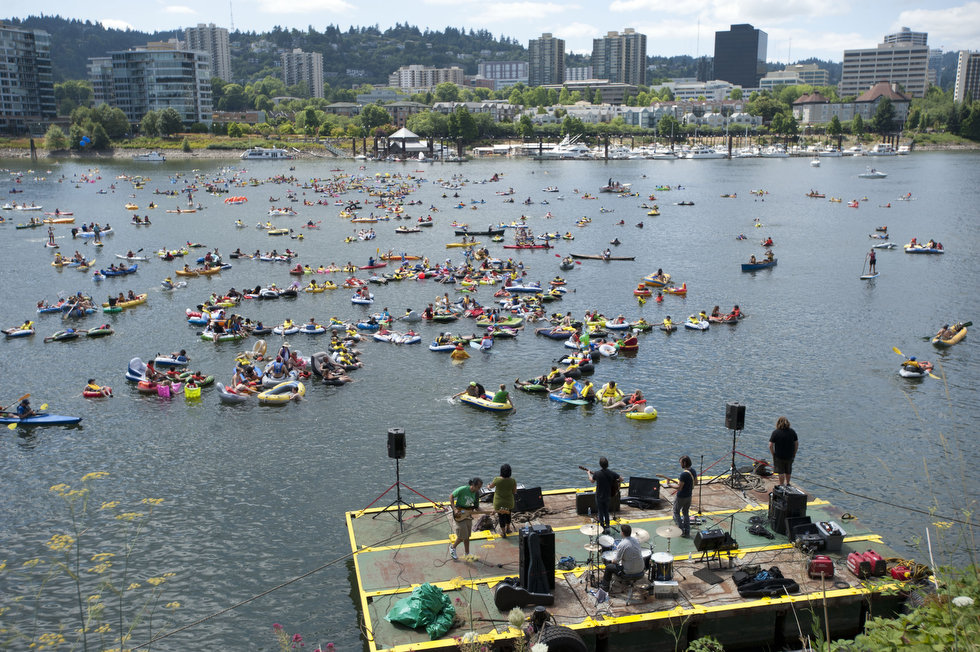
The 2011 event

The Human Access Project (HAP), under the leadership of Willie Levenson, started the Big Float in 2011 to give Portland residents positive interactions with the Willamette River.” The name for the event came from Portland's Big Pipe project — a 20-year undertaking that was completed in 2011. It entailed the overhaul of the city's wastewater system to divert sewage from flowing into the Willamette River and the Columbia Slough. After completion of the pipe project, the Willamette River became more swimmable.

In 2015, in advance of the event, there was a large occurrence of a harmful cyanobacterial bloom. Because the Oregon Department of Environmental Quality did not have testing ability, HAP paid to have testing done. The results were negative and the event went on as planned.

Since inception some 25,000 people have participated using tubes, kayaks, or flotation devices to drift half a mile downriver. The event was ranked the sixteenth top festival in Oregon (out of 50) by The Oregonian. An estimated 6,000 people participated in 2018, and more than 4,000 participated in 2019. There were no official Big Float events in 2020 or 2021 due to the COVID-19 pandemic.

The tenth and final event took place on July 10, 2022, and an estimated 5,000 people participated. HAP founder Willie Levenson said the Big Float achieved what it set out to do, and now the group can focus on other activities with particular focus on finding a way to reduce toxic algae blooms in Ross Island Lagoon.

== See also ==
- Christmas Ships Parade, another annual event on the Willamette River
- Culture of Portland, Oregon
- Witch paddle, another annual event on the Willamette River
