= Human Access Project =

Organization based in Portland, Oregon, U.S.

- Logo
- Formation: October 1, 2010; 16 years ago
- Founder: Willie Levenson
- Purpose: Expanding public access to and recreational use of the Willamette River
- Headquarters: Portland, Oregon, U.S.
- Executive Director: Scott Fogarty
- Website: Official website

Human Access Project (HAP) is a nonprofit organization based in Portland, Oregon, whose mission is "transforming Portland's relationship with the Willamette River". The organization's vision is "a city in love with its river" and it describes its work through four objectives: "Build it, Use it, Love it, Sustain it". HAP was founded by Willie Levenson, who served as the organization's Executive Director and whose official title was Ringleader. During Levenson's 16-year tenure, HAP became associated with a broader cultural shift in Portland's relationship with the Willamette River, including expanded public access, organized river swimming, beach activation, public events, media advocacy, and civic partnerships. Levenson has been described as a tireless and effective advocate for swimming, river recreation, and public access to the Willamette River in Portland.

During Levenson's tenure, HAP spearheaded the creation of the River Hugger Swim Team, Audrey McCall Beach and Poet's Beach, the opening of the Kevin Duckworth Memorial Dock for swimming, fishing and non-motorized boating, and public events including The Big Float, Mayoral Swim, Duckworth Wednesdays, the Valentine's Dip, Beach Brigade, and Audrey McCall Beach Splashdowns.

== History and activities ==
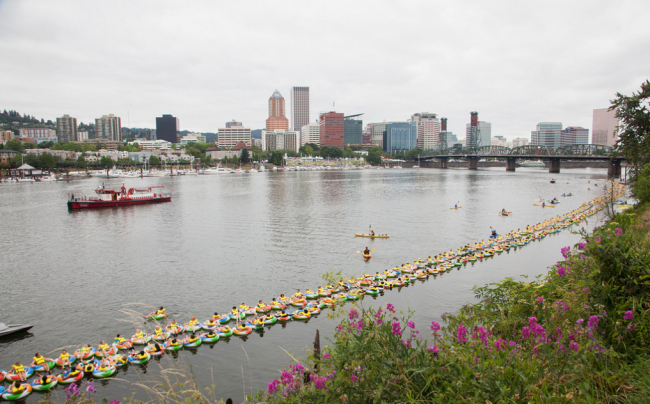
2013 photograph of the longest line of swim rings / tubes, per the Guinness World Records

Willie Levenson founded the Human Access Project in 2010. Its early work focused on changing public perception of the Willamette River and encouraging recreational access, including swimming, floating, and public events on the river.

On July 5, 2013, HAP set a Guinness World Record for the "longest line of swim rings / tubes" with a total of 620 participants.

In 2014, Levenson performed "Our River", a song he wrote with Tommy "T-Bone" Vandel to promote human access to the Willamette River, before Portland City Council. The recorded song is performed by Lewi Longmire and Anita Lee Elliot.

In June 2026, Ivan McLean's steel sculpture River Dragon (nicknamed "Willie") was installed near the St. Johns Bridge. The work commemorates Levenson. A dedication ceremony and parade to Cathedral Park was organized by Bike Loud PDX and featured the percussion group The Last Regiment of Syncopated Drummers.

Levenson retired in mid 2026.

=== Site improvements ===
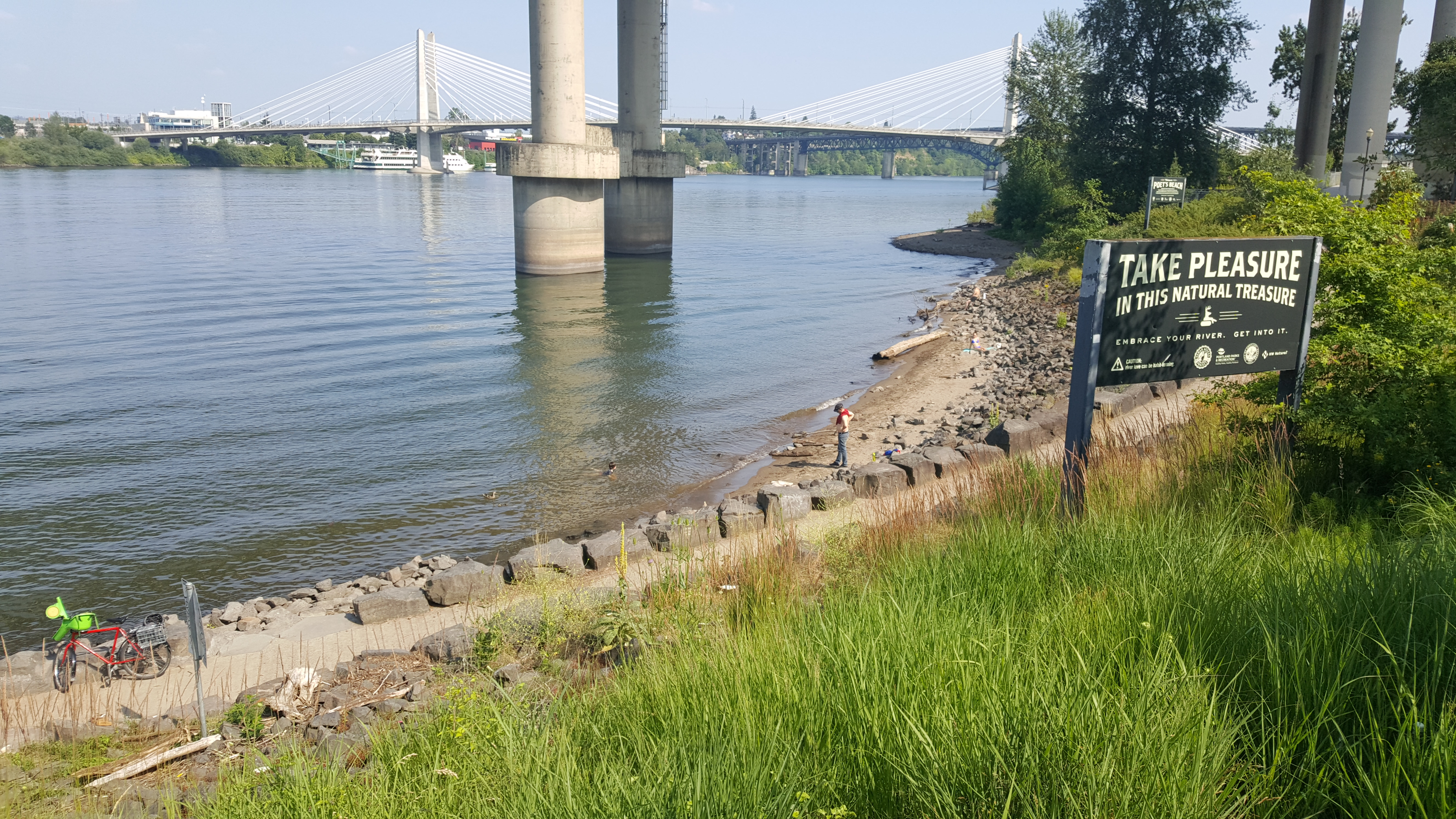
Poet's Beach (pictured in 2020) was officially recognized in 2017

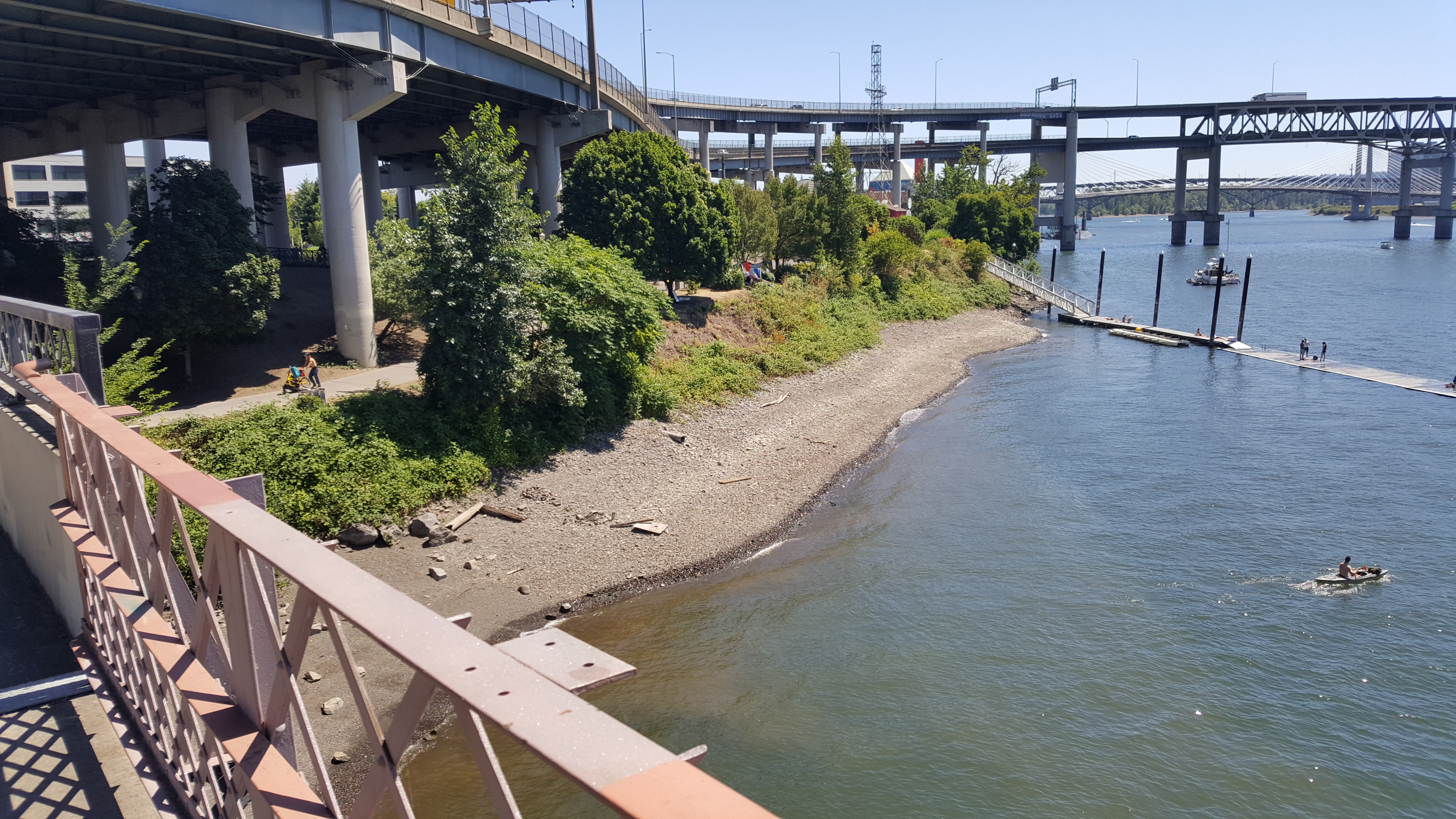
Audrey McCall Beach (pictured in 2020) was officially recognized in 2019

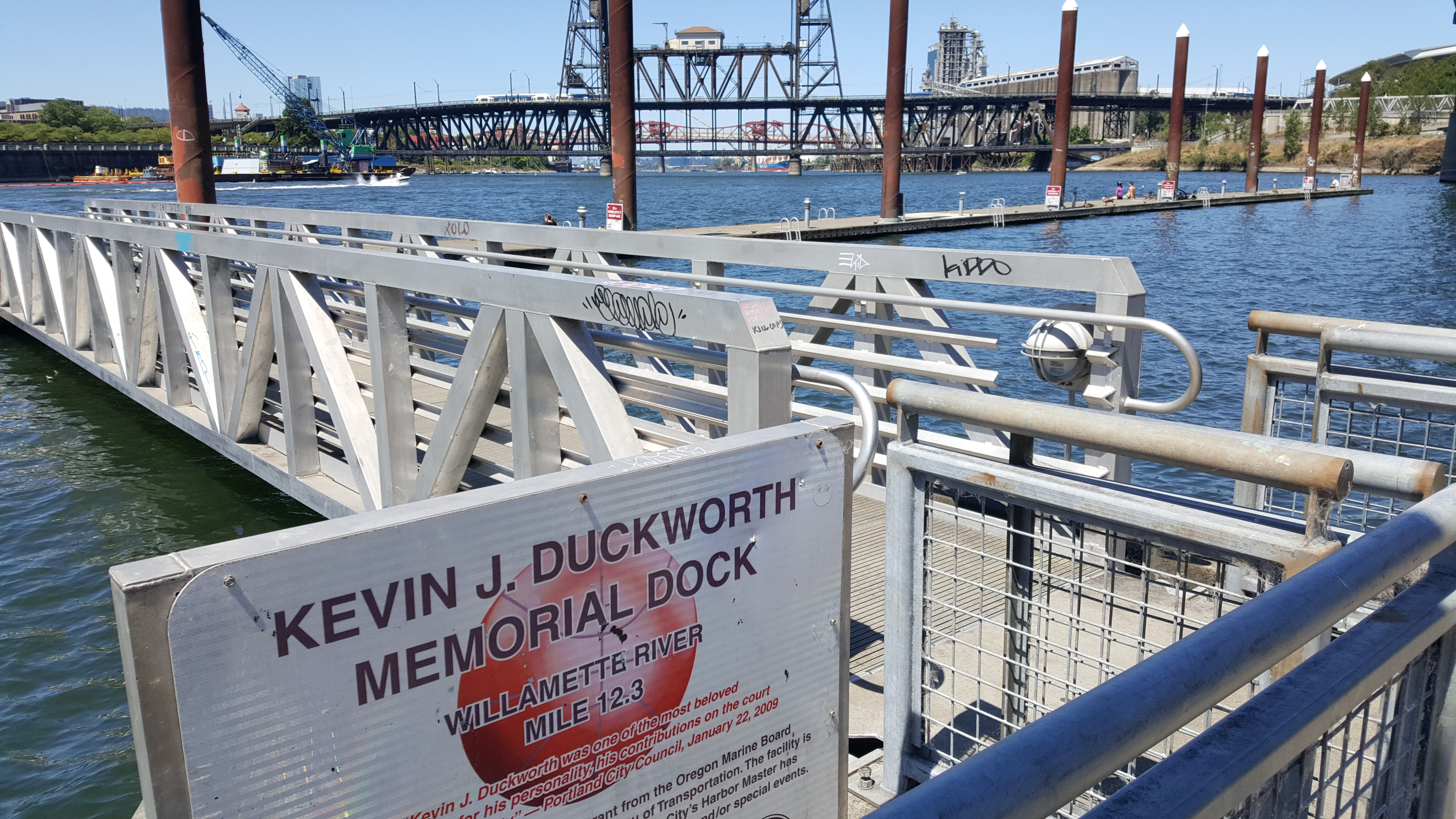
The Kevin Duckworth Memorial Dock debuted as a non-motorized swimming and fishing dock in 2020

HAP added a swim ladder to the Portland Fire and Rescue Station 21 Dock, known as the Firehouse Dock, creating a new recreational access point to the river. With the addition of a swim ladder, the Fire House Dock became launching point of the River Hugger Swim Team.

In 2017, HAP's activism led to the opening of the Poet's Beach, Portland's first officially recognized public swimming beach, in nearly 100 years. Additionally, HAP began work to mitigate a harmful cyanobacterial bloom that became a regular occurrence in the summer inside the Ross Island Lagoon, in partnership with Oregon State University (OSU). HAP also commissioned a dock swim study by landscape architectural firm M.I.G. to reimagine the Kevin Duckworth Memorial Dock as a non-motorized swimming and fishing dock.

On July 5, 2019, HAP's activism led to the recognition of Portland's second official public beach Audrey McCall Beach.

In 2020, HAP's activism led to converting the use of the Kevin Duckworth Dock from motorized to non-motorized and installation of eight swimming ladders and bicycle parking racks which HAP privately fundraised for. HAP and the landscape architecture firm GreenWorks P.C. collaborated to develop a concept for a park and ramp design in connection with the proposed Burnside Bridge replacement. On November 21, 2021, Portland City Council voted to further investigate this park and ramp concept by spending $20,000 to do cost analysis and feasibility.

In 2022, HAP and Portland Parks & Recreation collaborated to designate six safer swimming areas on the Willamette River: Audrey McCall Beach, Cathedral Park Beach, Kevin Duckworth Memorial Dock, Poet's Beach, Sellwood Riverfront Park Beach, and Tom McCall Bowl Beach. In 2023, U.S. Senator Jeff Merkley championed $100,000 of funding for HAP for Ross Island Lagoon harmful cyanobacteria bloom research through the United States Senate.

==== Cathedral Park ====
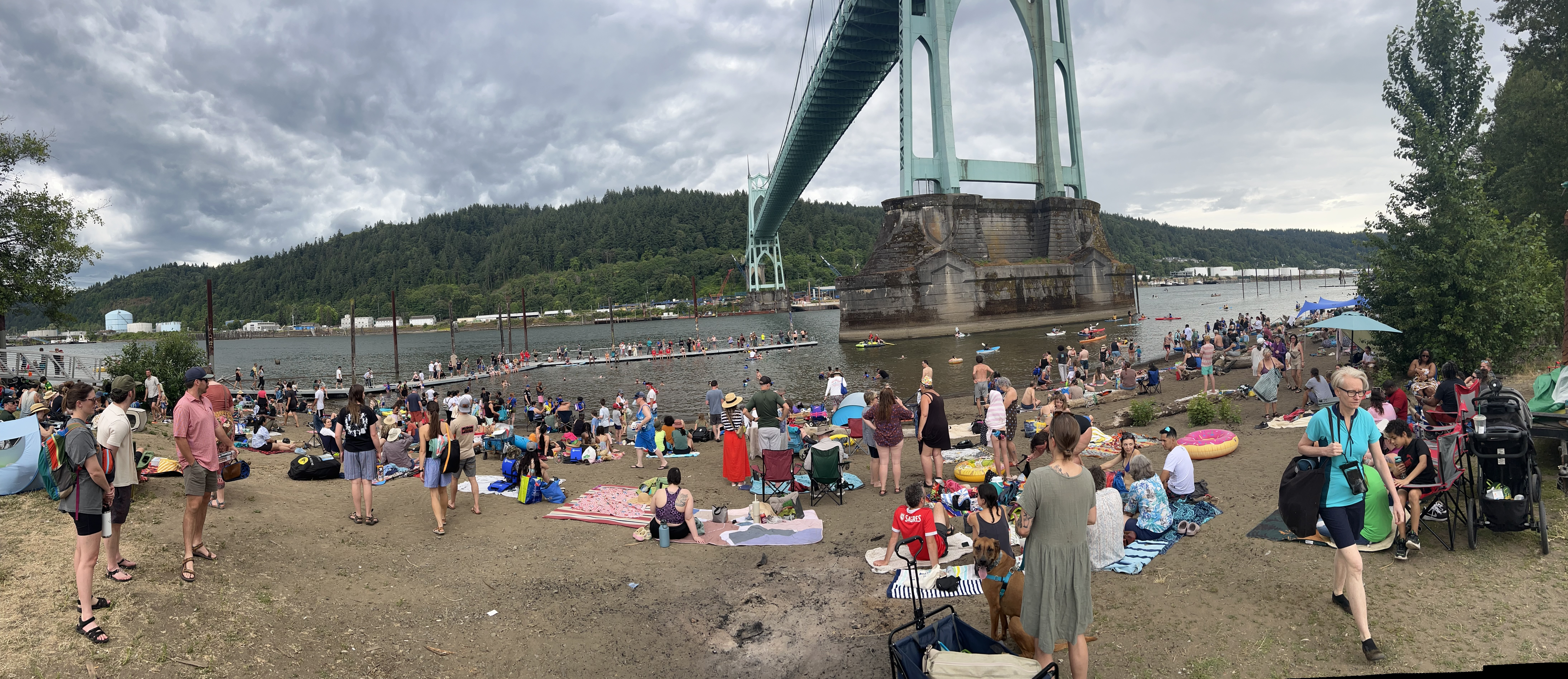
Cathedral Park River Fest, 2024

In 2021, HAP led an effort to remove 25 tons of concrete and rubble from the river's edge of Cathedral Park with help from partners and volunteers. In 2023, HAP partnered with Green Anchors and other organizations to have 200+ volunteers help remove 100 tons of concrete and rock from the south end of Cathedral Park Beach.

==== Ross Island Lagoon ====
HAP's work on Ross Island has focused on reducing recurring harmful cyanobacterial blooms in Ross Island Lagoon, a stagnant former gravel-mining area in the lower Willamette River. In 2018, Oregon Public Broadcasting (OPB) reported that toxic algal blooms in the lower Willamette had become increasingly common and that most had been traced to the lagoon, where warm, stagnant and nutrient-rich water created favorable conditions for cyanobacteria.

HAP began working with OSU researchers on the issue in 2017. The effort developed through a close collaboration between HAP founder Willie Levenson and OSU professor Desirée Tullos, whose research focused on hydrodynamics, water quality and engineering approaches to reducing the blooms. Willamette Week reported in 2023 that Levenson had shifted focus from the Big Float toward reducing toxic algae blooms in Ross Island Lagoon, and that Levenson and Tullos supported restoring circulation through a flushing channel so river water could flow through the lagoon. OSU's College of Engineering later described Tullos's work as centered on a partnership with Levenson and HAP, beginning with baseline data collection in 2017 and advancing toward designs to reconnect the lagoon to the river by excavating a flushing channel through an artificial embankment installed in the 1920s.

In 2024 and 2025, HAP raised funds from public, nonprofit and tribal sources for initial engineering design work. OPB and the Oregon Capital Chronicle reported in 2025 that Levenson had raised about $500,000 for the first 30 percent of the planning process, and that House Bill 3314 would have directed about $1 million to OSU to complete design work for a channel through Ross Island. In January 2026, Multnomah County said it had partnered with HAP and OSU to convene public officials, scientists and advocates on the issue, and that funding from the East Multnomah Soil and Water Conservation District, Spirit Mountain Community Fund, The Nature Conservancy, Multnomah County and an appropriation from U.S. Senator Jeff Merkley had supported the start of 30 percent designs for the project.

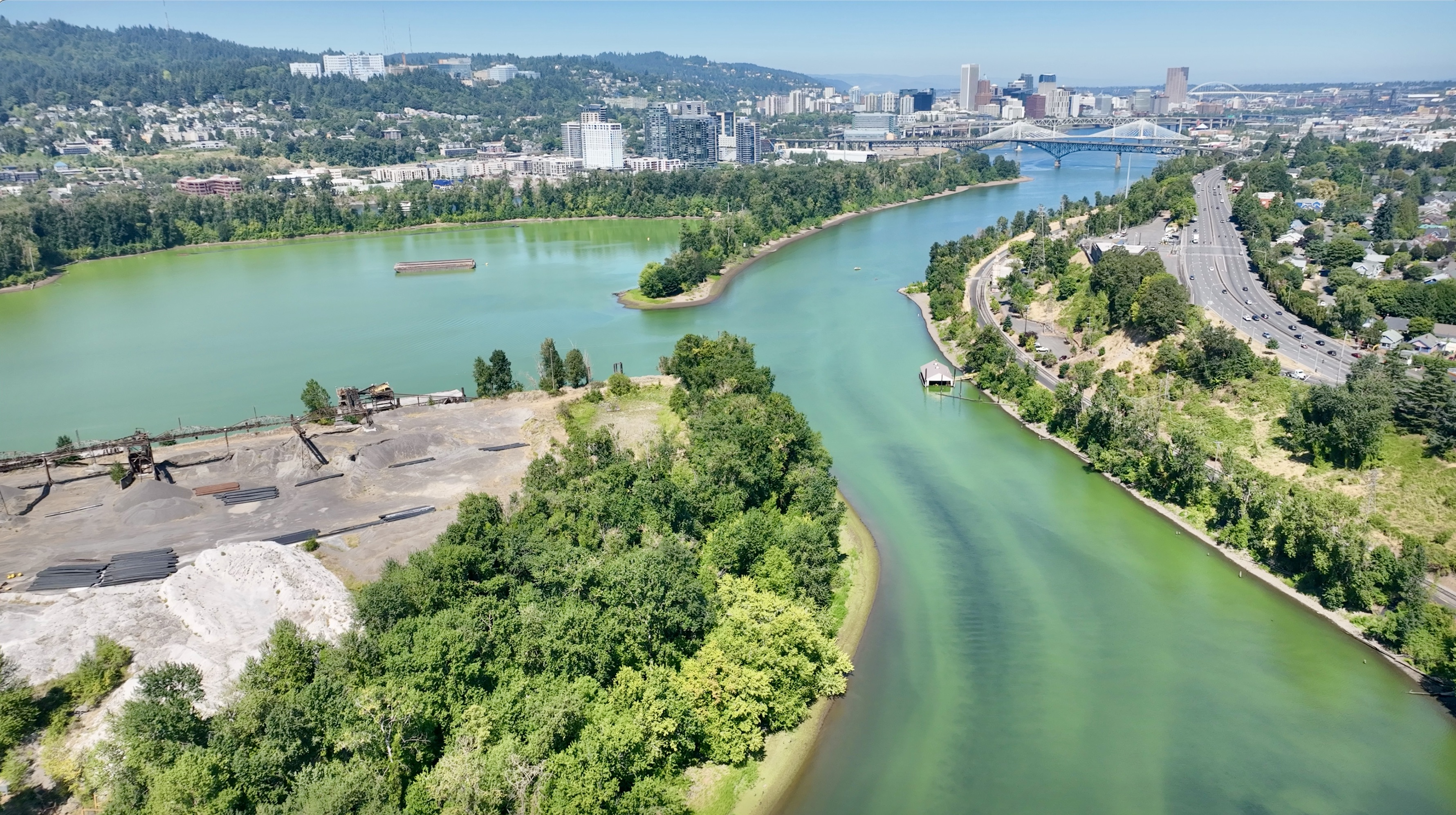
Ross Island Lagoon harmful algae bloom, 2026

The 30 percent design phase culminated in a June 2026 public presentation on a proposed solution to the recurring harmful algal blooms in Ross Island Lagoon. The event description said Tullos and the OSU team would share a 30 percent design representing the first phase of an engineering plan to evaluate feasibility, costs, permitting requirements and expected outcomes. OPB and the Oregon Capital Chronicle reported after the presentation that OSU and HAP had developed a proposal to excavate one or more channels through the lagoon to restore river circulation, but that the project had not yet secured state funding. The report described the project as costing roughly $20 million and said a $1 million planning request had failed to advance in the Oregon Legislature.

In August 2026, the Portland Mercury reported that the fate of Ross Island Lagoon had become HAP's primary focus, and that HAP supported engineering one or two channels into the lagoon, with estimated costs of $14 million for one channel and $26 million for two channels. In July 2026, the National Oceanic and Atmospheric Administration said it was supporting an OSU-led research team, in collaboration with HAP, Ross Island Sand & Gravel and the Portland Kayak & Canoe Team, to monitor an extreme bloom scenario and model management actions and engineering designs. NOAA said the proposed restoration design included one or two new channels to restore river flow through Ross Island Lagoon, and that additional data collection would help determine whether a second channel was necessary.

==== Tom McCall Waterfront Park ====
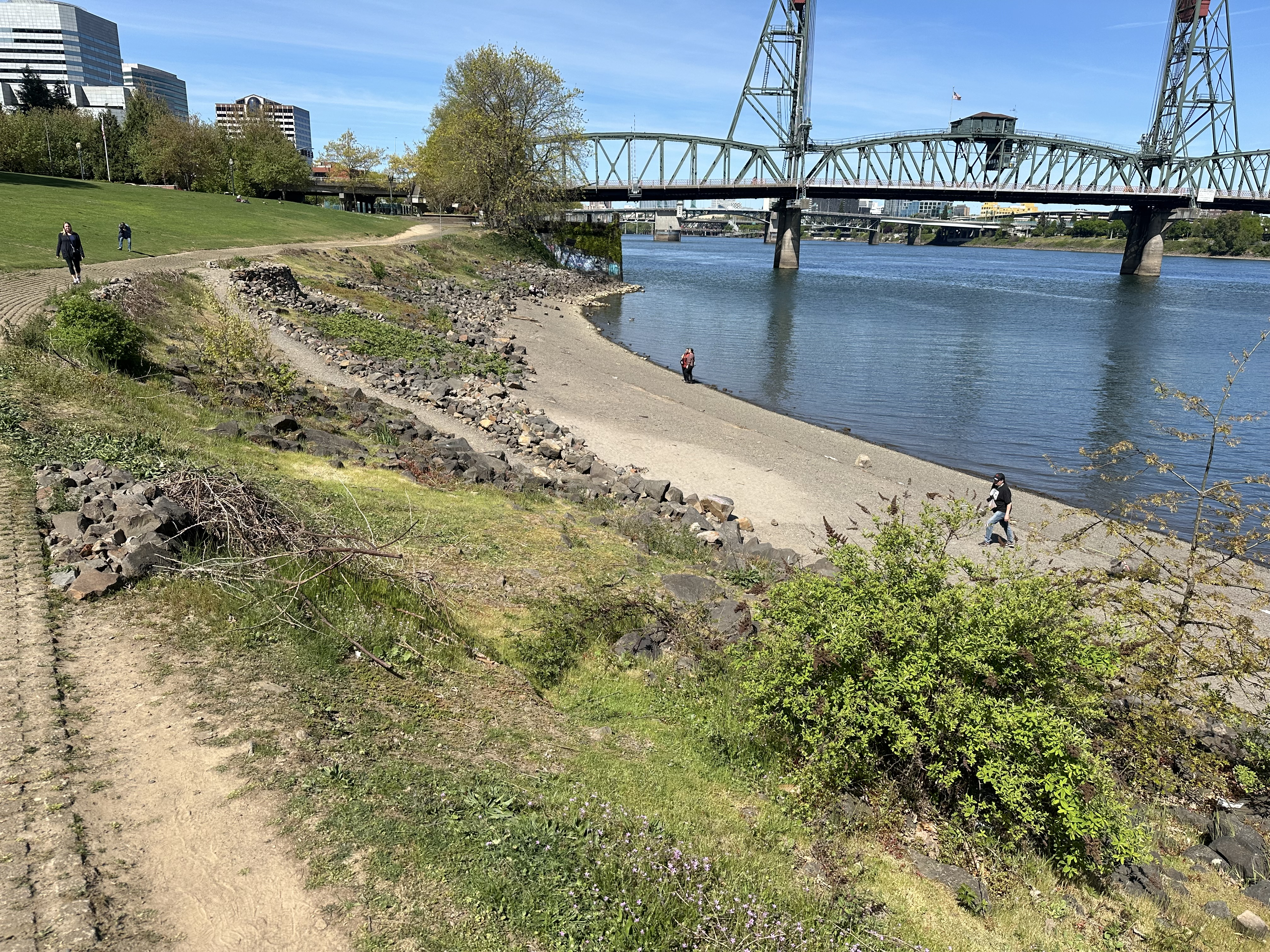
Tom McCall Bowl Beach, 2024

In 2012, HAP spearheaded a plan to have Portland Parks & Recreation designate an official city beach at the southern end of Tom McCall Waterfront Park, Tom McCall Bowl Beach. HAP also organized several cleanups of Tom McCall Bowl Beach called "Unrock the Bowl", where volunteers picked up riprap rocks from along the river's edge to the bank where the rock was initially installed for bank protection. HAP's successful activism resulted in the city adding "swim at your own risk" signs to Tom McCall Bowl Beach in 2013. In 2014, HAP paid for larger signs to be created and installed at Tom McCall Bowl Beach and what would become Poet's Beach.

In 2023, HAP continued their work from 2012 at Tom McCall Bowl Beach "Unrocking the Bowl", where 100 volunteers moved 20 tons of riprap rock from the river's edge to the bank and make trail improvement to two trails that lead to the river.

=== Events ===
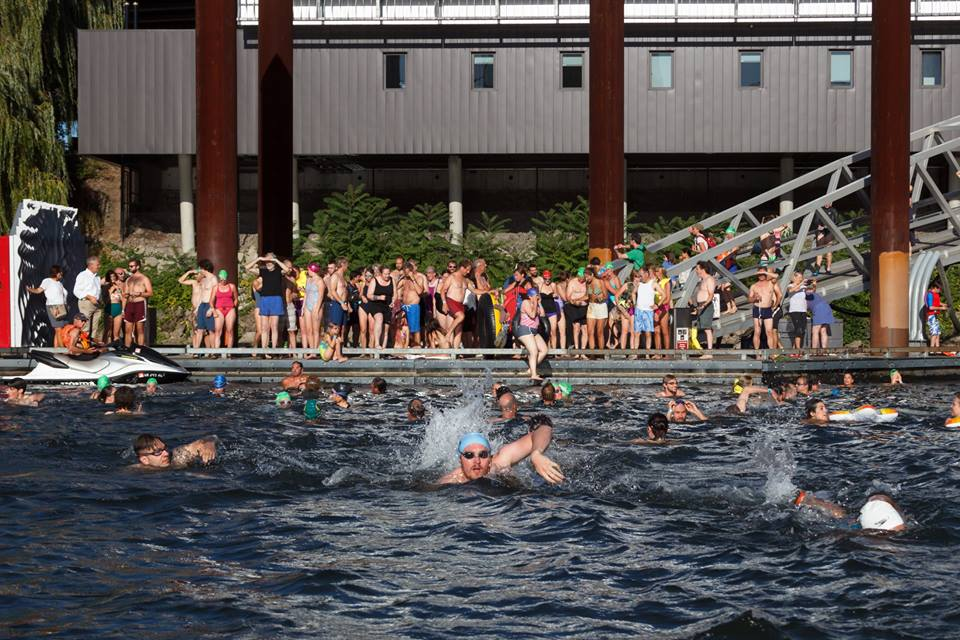
The first Mayoral Swim, 2016

In 2016, incumbent Portland mayor Ted Wheeler swam his ballot across the Willamette River with the River Hugger Swim Team, and later joined HAP for the first annual Mayoral Swim. As a way to lead by example and demonstrate to the people of Portland that the river is safe for swimming and recreation from a human health perspective, HAP organized an annual Mayoral Swim with Wheeler. The first and second events were held on August 18, 2016, and July 27, 2017, respectively. The event happened again in 2018 and 2019.

In August 2017, HAP organized a solar eclipse viewing party in innertubes on the river launching from the Fire House Dock. In 2025, the group hosted a swim to celebrate a year without any combined sewer overflows in the Willamette River. HAP hosts the beach party Friday Splashdown at Audrey McCall Beach.

In addition to events organized by HAP, there have been benefits organized to benefit the group. In 2026, Nike Swim organized the inaugural Portland Mile race. Approximately 150 people participated in the sold-out event.

==== Former ====
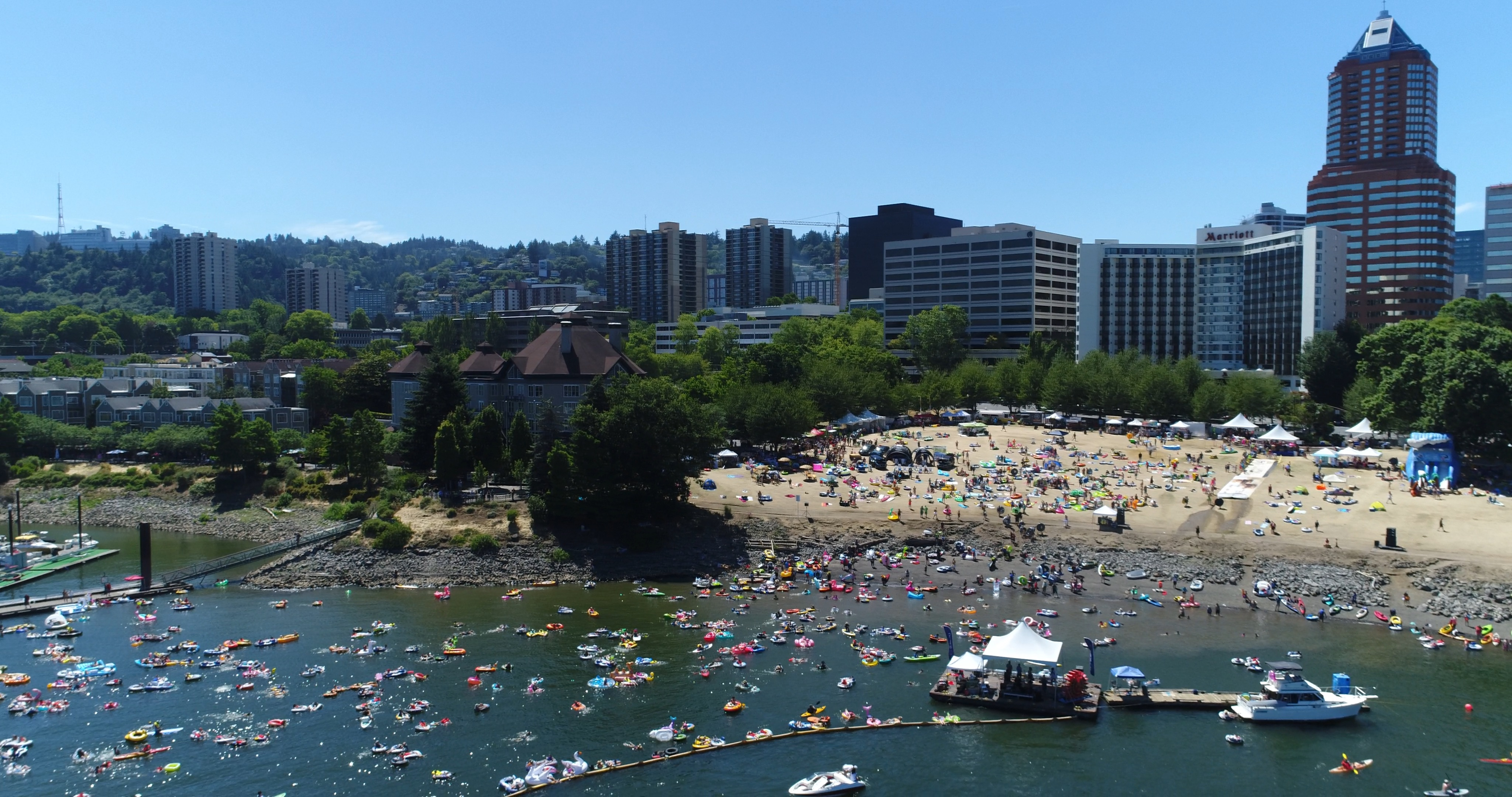
Big Float, 2019

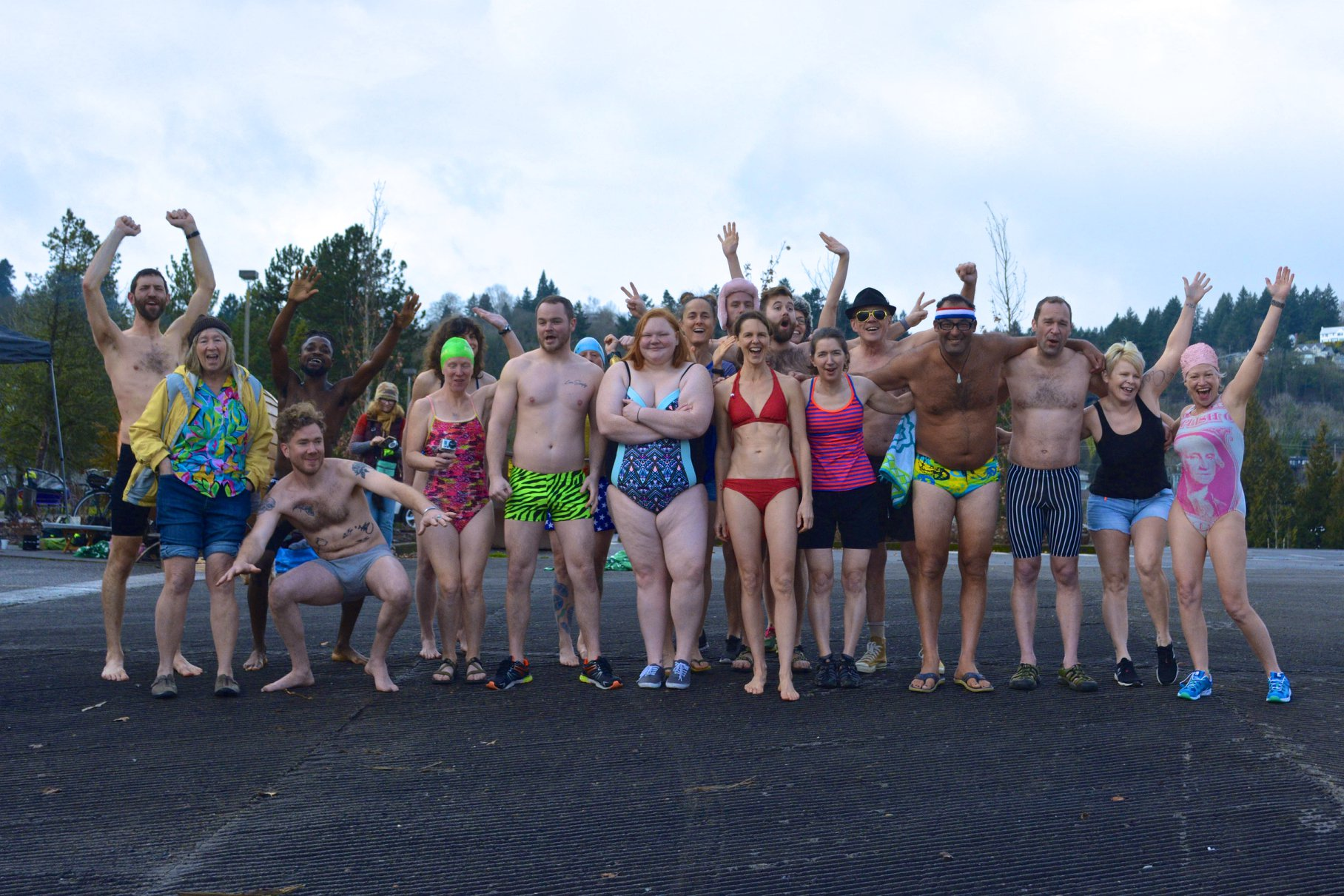
The first Valentine's Dip, 2018

HAP created Big Float in 2011. Over 25,000 participated over the ten years of the event. The intent of the event was to actualize HAP's organization mission of A City in love with its River. The event was described by the organization's Ringleader as "a movement disguised as a party". The organization produced the last event in 2022, and roughly 5,000 people attended.

HAP had its first Valentine's Dip in February 2018. The intent of this event was to show how the water quality of the Willamette River had improved. Combined Sewage Overflows most frequently happened in the Winter/Spring prior to the completion of the Big Pipe. This was an opportunity to show post Big Pipe completion that the public could even swim in the Willamette River in these traditionally unswimmable months. Approximately 100 people took the plunge in the third Valentine's Dip in 2020. The event marked 180 consecutive days of no combined sewage overflows into the river. In 2022, HAP retired the Valentine's Dip to join forces with Special Olympics Oregon when they moved their annual Polar Plunge to the Willamette River from the Columbia River.

=== River Hugger Swim Team ===
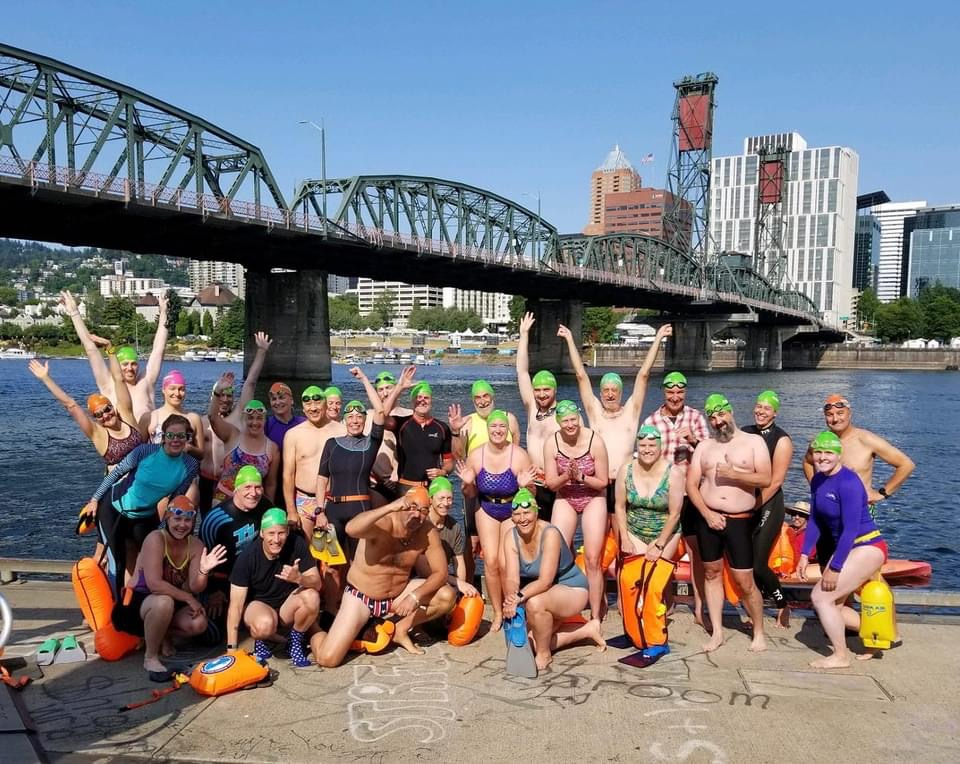
The River Hugger Swim Team

Established in 2012, the River Hugger Swim Team is an open water "recreational protest swim" bringing attention to the extreme deficit of water edge access in Portland. Participants are followed by kayakers and paddleboarders for to assist with safety. In 2018, Mayor Ted Wheeler joined nearly 40 “Hugger” swimmers to kick off the HAP's River Hugger Swim Team.

== See also ==
- Willamette Riverkeeper
