= Witches Paddle =

Annual event in Bend, Oregon, U.S.

- Status: Active
- Date: October 31
- Frequency: Annually
- Venue: Riverbend Park
- Location: Bend, Oregon
- Country: United States
- Years active: 6
- Inaugurated: October 31, 2020
- Founder: MountainStar Family Relief Nursery
- Most recent: October 31, 2024
- Attendance: Over 2,000
- Major events: Paddleboarding

The Witches Paddle is an annual event in Bend, Oregon, in which paddleboarders dress as witches and warlocks on the Deschutes River. The event is similar to the annual witch paddle in Portland, Oregon.
