= Witch paddle =

Annual event in Portland, Oregon, U.S.

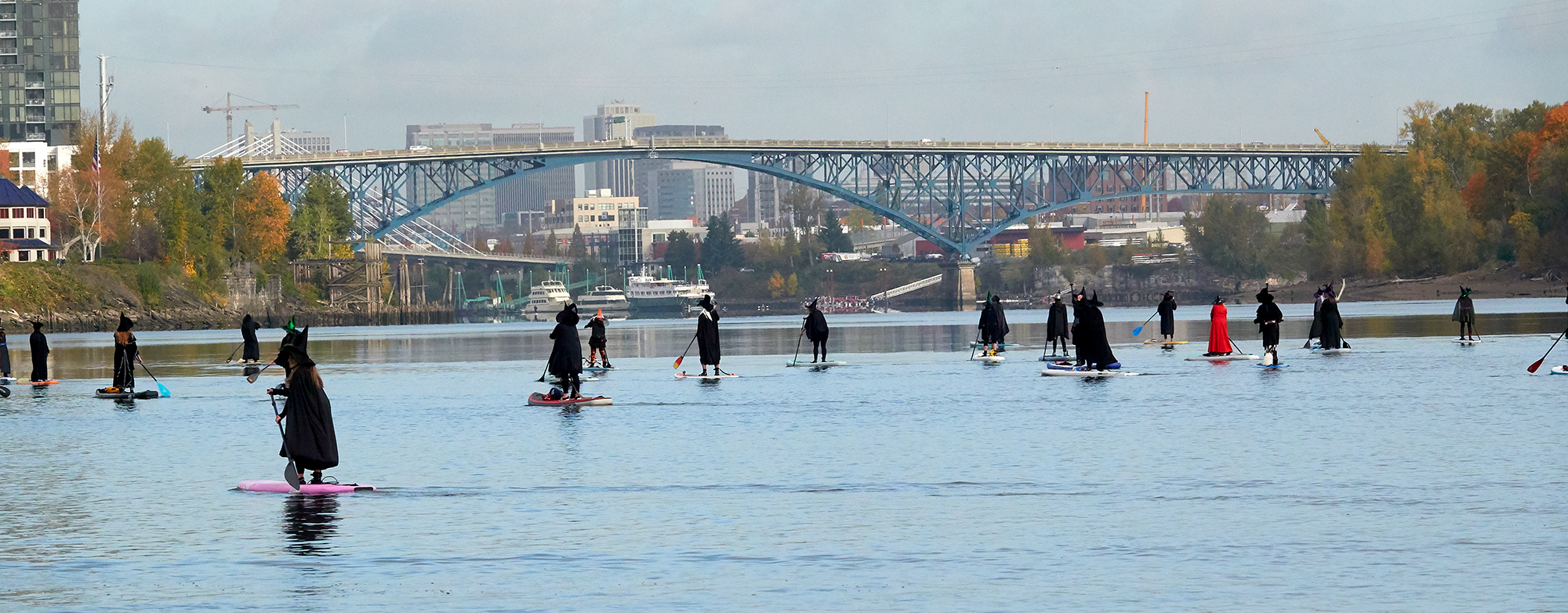
- Event participants in 2019
- Frequency: Annually
- Venue: Willamette River
- Location: Portland, Oregon
- Country: United States
- Years active: 8–9
- Founder: Ginny Kauffman

The Portland Stand Up Paddleboard Witches on the Willamette (SUP WOW), more commonly known as "Witches on the Willamette", or simply the witch paddle, is an annual witch-themed standup paddleboarding event in Portland, Oregon, United States. Ginny Kauffman organized the first event in 2017.

== Description ==
The witch-themed event, traditionally leading up to Halloween in October, involves people wearing costumes while standup paddleboarding in the Willamette River. Participants have dressed as witches, sorcerers, warlocks, wizards, and "aqua-type creatures from the deep". Some participants have also attached skeletons, spiders, and other "spooky" decorations to their paddleboards. Children and dogs have also participated.

There is no fee to participate, but some events have also served as clothing drives or fundraisers. According to KOIN, the event "is open to anyone with a paddleboard and a witch costume". Event organizers have emphasized the need for participants to be experienced with paddleboarding, as lifeguards are not on duty.

== History ==
Ginny Kauffman organized the event starting in 2017; she was inspired to launch the event in Portland after seeing costumed paddleboarders in Morro Bay, California, in 2016. Attendance has grown from a few dozen Halloween enthusiasts to more than 300 participants.

For the event in 2017, participants launched from Johns Landing. In 2018, KGW called the event "a stroke of Portland genius" and said, "You know you've hit big time when the Portland Fire & Rescue Bureau sends a boat to send up huge water jets usually worthy for a Rose Festival Navy Fleet Arrival." In 2018–2019, paddle boarders traveled from Willamette Park to Tom McCall Waterfront Park and back. The 2020 event was cancelled because of the COVID-19 pandemic. Participants started following the previously used route again in 2021.

In 2024, Kauffman said the event was on a hiatus while a search was underway for a new organizer.

== See also ==
- Big Float, a defunct annual event on the Willamette River
- Christmas Ships Parade, an annual holiday event on the Willamette River
- Culture of Portland, Oregon
- Witches Paddle, similar event in Bend, Oregon
