= Audrey McCall Beach =

Urban beach in Portland, Oregon, U.S.

- Beach
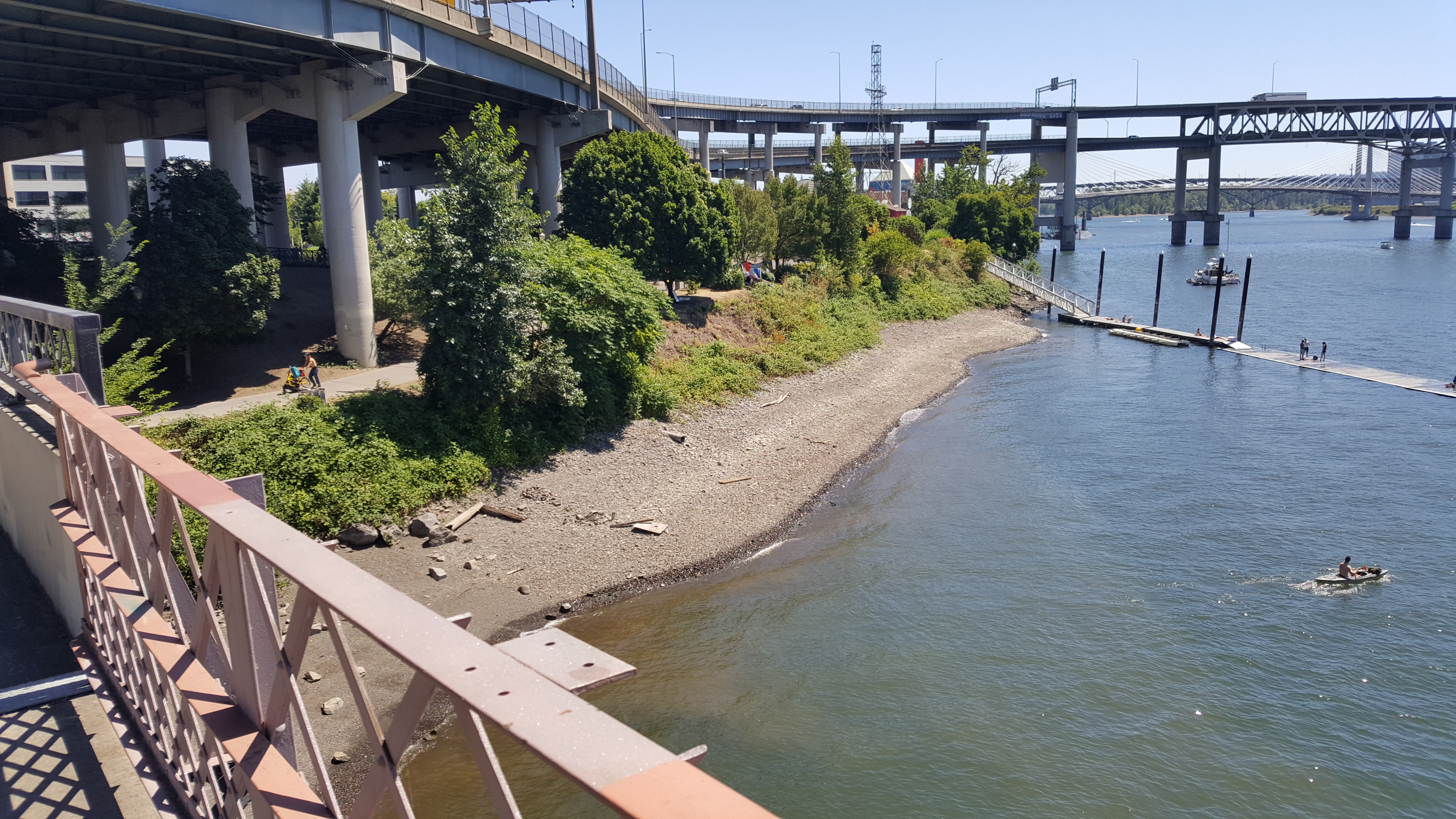
- View of the beach from the Hawthorne Bridge, July 2020

- Location within Portland, Oregon
- Coordinates: 45.5122911°N 122.6680385°W
- Location: Portland, Oregon
- Water bodies: Willamette River

Audrey McCall Beach (also known as Eastbank Crescent Beach, or the Eastbank Crescent and Dock) is an urban beach along the east bank of the Willamette River, near the Hawthorne Bridge in Portland, Oregon, United States.

== Description and history ==
Named after Audrey McCall, the opening was spearheaded by the Human Access Project (HAP). HAP removed 19 tons of concrete from what would become Audrey McCall Beach during 2013–2019 with assistance of volunteers and inmate work crews.

In 2015, HAP successfully lobbied City Council to create an improved public beach on the east side of the river, ostensibly Audrey McCall Beach.

On October 8, 2017, Tad McCall (son of former Oregon Governor Tom McCall and Audrey McCall) expressed support of development of a beach park to honor his mother. In 2018, HAP partnered with Portland Bureau of Transportation (PBOT) to produce Sunday Splashways in conjunction with PBOT's Sunday Parkways program.

The beach opened as the city's second official public beach on July 5, 2019. HAP spearheaded the effort, acquiring necessary permits for the swimming area and funding a lifeguard program at the beach for the opening year. Lifeguards were stationed at the beach during select hours on Fridays through Sundays between July 5 and September 1, 2019. In 2019 HAP partnered with non profit Ground Score to fund the hiring of homeless individuals to keep the beach clean in the summer.

July 25, 2022, Portland Parks & Recreation in partnership with HAP named Audrey McCall Beach one of six recommended safer swimming areas on the Willamette River. The beach party Friday Splashdown is held at Audrey McCall Beach.

== See also ==
- List of beaches in Oregon
