= Cathedral Park, Portland, Oregon =

Cathedral Park
- Neighborhood
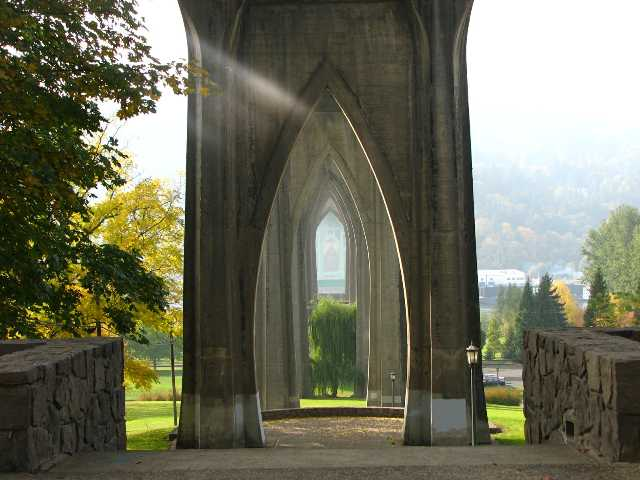
- Cathedral Park
- Interactive map of Cathedral Park
- Coordinates: 45°35′18″N 122°45′29″W
- Country: United States
- State: Oregon
- City: Portland

Government
  - Association: Cathedral Park Neighborhood Association

Area
  - Total: 1.03 sq mi (2.7 km^{2})

Population (2000)
  - Total: 3,033
  - Density: 4,010/sq mi (1,550/km^{2})

Housing
  - No. of households: 2046
  - Occupancy rate: 94.6% occupied
  - Owner-occupied: 701 households (52%)
  - Renting: 660 households (48%)
  - Avg. household size: 2.0 persons

Cathedral Park is a neighborhood in Portland, Oregon. It is situated on the North Portland peninsula and lies on the east shore of the Willamette River. The neighborhood is named after Cathedral Park, which is located under the St. Johns Bridge, and was given its name due to the Gothic arches that support the bridge, which resemble a cathedral arch.

== History ==
The St. Johns Bridge connects the neighborhood to the Linnton and Northwest Industrial neighborhoods in Northwest Portland across the Willamette River. In addition to these neighborhoods, Cathedral Park is bordered by St. Johns to the northeast and University Park to the southeast.

The 1911 Sanborn Map Index for the City of St. Johns, Oregon, shows that the Cathedral Park neighborhood was part of the original City of St. Johns prior to annexation by Portland in 1915.

The neighborhood is named after its most prominent landmark, the city park also called Cathedral Park, which in turn is named after the cathedral-like columns of the St. Johns Bridge it surrounds.

== Demographics ==
In 2020, 4,130 people lived in Cathedral Park, up 24% from 3,338 in 2010. 76% of people identified as white, 3.7% as American Indian or Alaska Native, 5.4% as Black or African American, 4.9% as Asian, 1.2% as Native Hawaiian or Pacific Islander, and 10.3% as some other race. 11.4% identified as Hispanic or Latino (any race). The median age in Cathedral Park was 38.1. The median household income was listed at $81,000 and 15% of the neighborhood was covered by tree canopy. 70% of eligible residents voted in the 2020 general election.

== See also ==
- Burlington Northern Railroad Bridge 5.1
