= Kevin Duckworth Memorial Dock =

Dock in Portland, Oregon, U.S.

Kevin J. Duckworth Memorial Dock
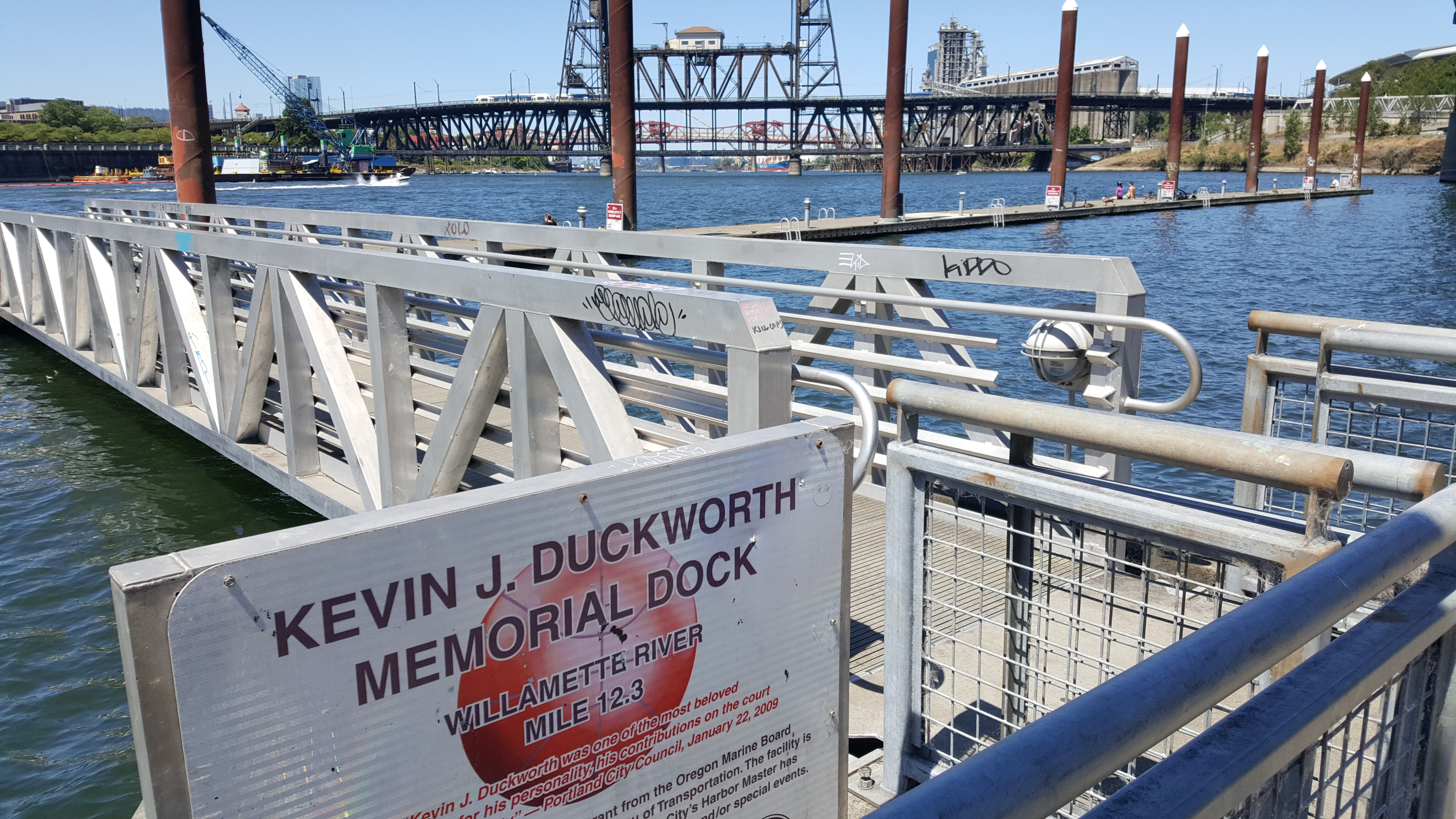
- Entrance and signage for the dock, 2020

Location
- Location: Portland, Oregon, United States
- Coordinates: 45°31′29.3″N 122°39′57.3″W

Details
- Type: Dock

The Kevin J. Duckworth Memorial Dock is a dock on the Willamette River, along Portland, Oregon's Eastbank Esplanade.

== History ==
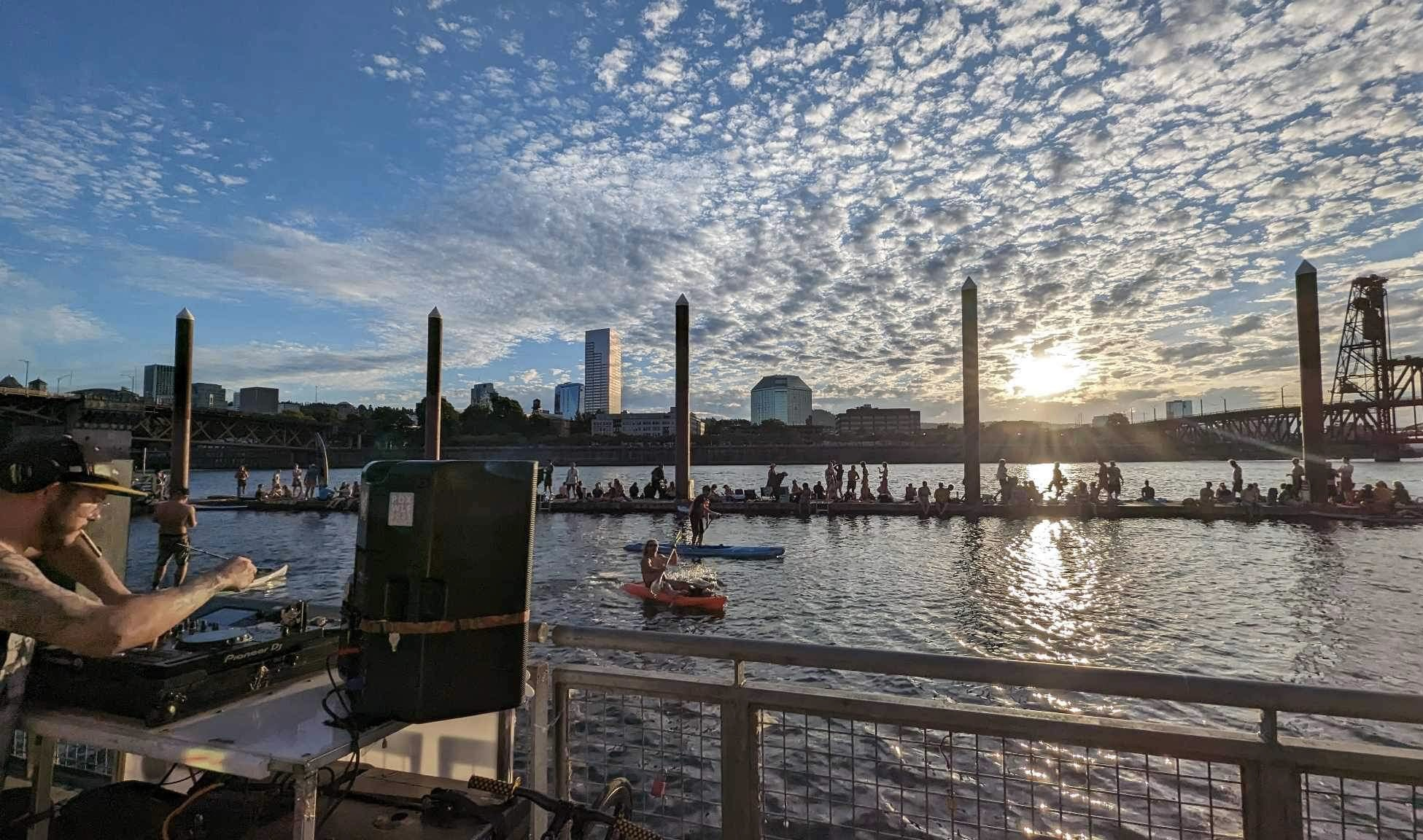
"Duckworth Summer Wednesdays" series participants at the dock in 2023

The dock has served as a memorial to Kevin Duckworth since 2009. In 2016, the Oregon State Marine Board considered a proposal from Daimler Trucking North America to relocate the dock to Swan Island to the company's headquarters. This move was approved by Oregon State Marine Board and Portland Parks & Recreation (PP&R). Human Access Project (HAP) intervened to stop this move from happening. The organization proposed improvements to the dock in 2017 by hiring landscape architect firm M.I.G. to reinvision the use of the dock as a non-motorized swimming and fishing dock that included swim ladders and bike racks.

In 2020, HAP was successful in converting the use of the dock from motorized to non motorized and implementing improvements including the addition of eight swimming ladders and bike racks. On July 19, 2021, City of Portland Commissioner Mingus Mapps participated in a Duckworth Wednesday event, where he spoke and jumped in the Willamette River with his staff. In 2022, PP&R and HAP designated the dock one of six safer swimming areas on the Willamette River. In May 2024, the Portland City Council unanimously agreed to transfer the Duckworth (as well as the Holman Dock) to PP&R. These docks were previously managed by Portland Bureau of Transportation and Prosper Portland respectively.

Approximately 50 volunteers cleared rubble near the dock in 2025.
