= St. Johns Bridge =

Bridge in Oregon, U.S.

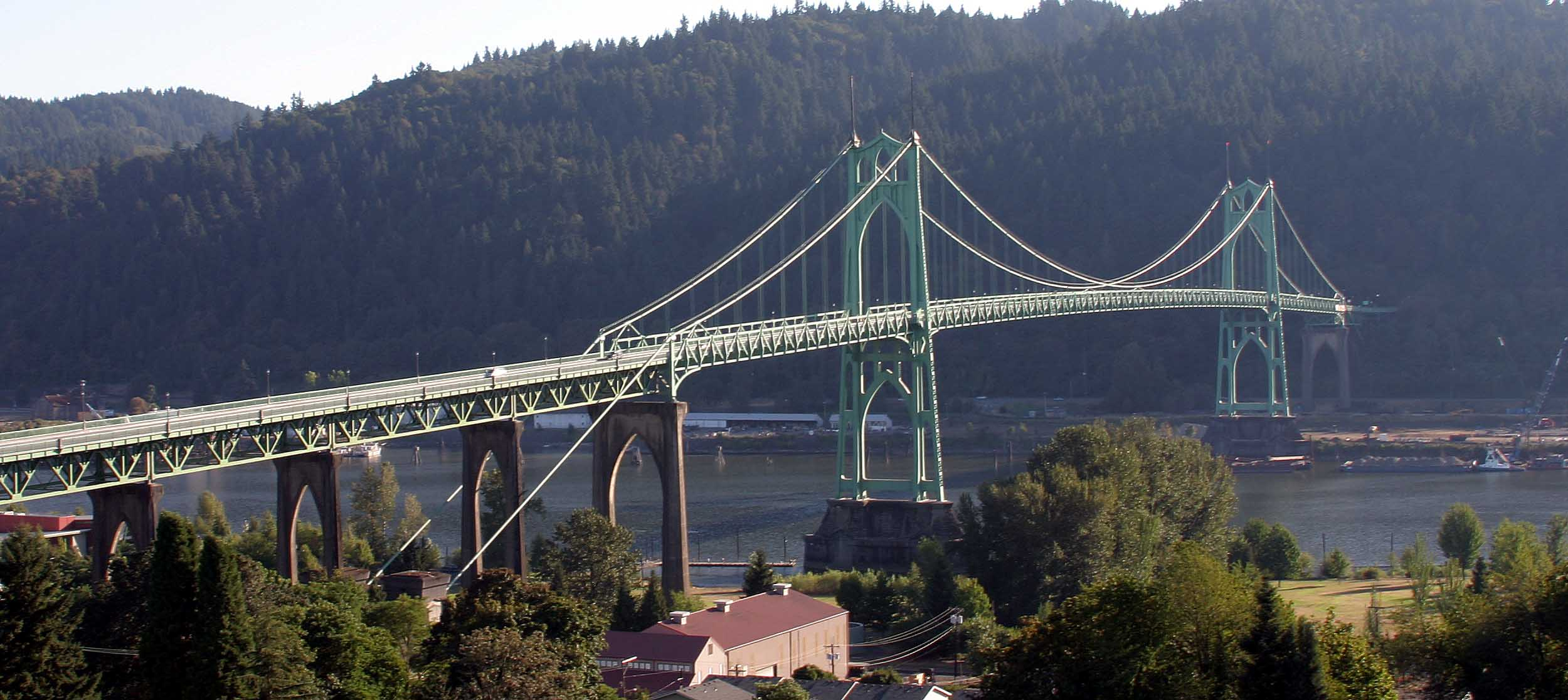
- St. Johns Bridge in Portland, Oregon, in 2005
- Coordinates: 45.58508°N 122.76477°W
- Carries: 4 lanes of US 30 Byp.
- Crosses: Willamette River
- Locale: Portland, Oregon, U.S.
- Maintained by: Oregon Department of Transportation
- Heritage status: Portland Historic Landmark

Characteristics
- Design: Suspension bridge, Gothic
- Total length: 2,067 feet (630 m)
- Height: 400 feet (120 m)
- Longest span: 1,207 feet (368 m)
- Clearance below: 205 feet (62 m)

History
- Designer: David B. Steinman
- Opened: June 13, 1931; 95 years ago

Location
- Interactive map of St. Johns Bridge

The St. Johns Bridge is a steel suspension bridge that spans the Willamette River in Portland, Oregon, United States, between the Cathedral Park neighborhood in North Portland and the Linnton neighborhood in Northwest Portland. The bridge is named for the community at its east end, St. Johns, which was originally an independent city before being annexed by Portland. The bridge carries the U.S. Route 30 Bypass. It is the only suspension bridge in the Willamette Valley and one of three public highway suspension bridges in Oregon.

The bridge has a 1,207-foot (368 m) center span and a total length of 2,067 feet (630 m). It is the tallest bridge in Portland, with two 400-foot-tall (120 m) towers and a 205-foot (62 m) navigational clearance. The adjacent park and neighborhood of Cathedral Park are named after the Gothic arch design of the bridge's towers and supports.

== History ==
=== Design and construction ===
Designed by consulting engineers David B. Steinman (1886–1960) and Holton D. Robinson, of New York, the St. Johns was the longest suspension-type bridge west of the Mississippi River at the time of construction. It is the only major highway suspension bridge in the Willamette Valley and one of only three major highway suspension bridges in Oregon.

At the time of the proposal to build the bridge, the area was served by a ferry that carried 1,000 vehicles a day. The proposal for a bridge was initially met with skepticism in Multnomah County, since St. Johns and Linnton were over five miles (8 km) from the heart of the city, and local business owners had minimal political clout. But after a lobbying effort that included a vaudeville-style show performed at grange halls and schools throughout the county, voters approved a $4.25 million bond (equivalent to $80 million in 2025) for the bridge in the November 1928 elections. Initially, a cantilever bridge was proposed, but a suspension bridge was selected due to an estimated $640,000 savings (equivalent to $12.00 million in 2025) in construction costs.

The construction of the bridge began a month before the stock market crash of 1929 and provided many county residents with employment during the Great Depression. Because of its proximity to the Swan Island Municipal Airport, some government officials wanted the bridge painted yellow with black stripes for higher visibility from the air. County officials waited until St. Patrick's Day, 1931, to announce that it would be painted green. The bridge is named for the community at its east end, St. Johns, which was originally an independent city but was annexed by Portland in 1915.

Dedication of the St. Johns bridge was delayed for one month to make it the centerpiece of the 23rd annual Rose Festival. The bridge was dedicated on June 13, 1931, and during the ceremony, bridge engineer, David B. Steinman, said:

A challenge and an opportunity to create a structure of enduring beauty in the God-given wondrous background was offered us when were asked to design the bridge. It is the most beautiful bridge in the world, we feel.

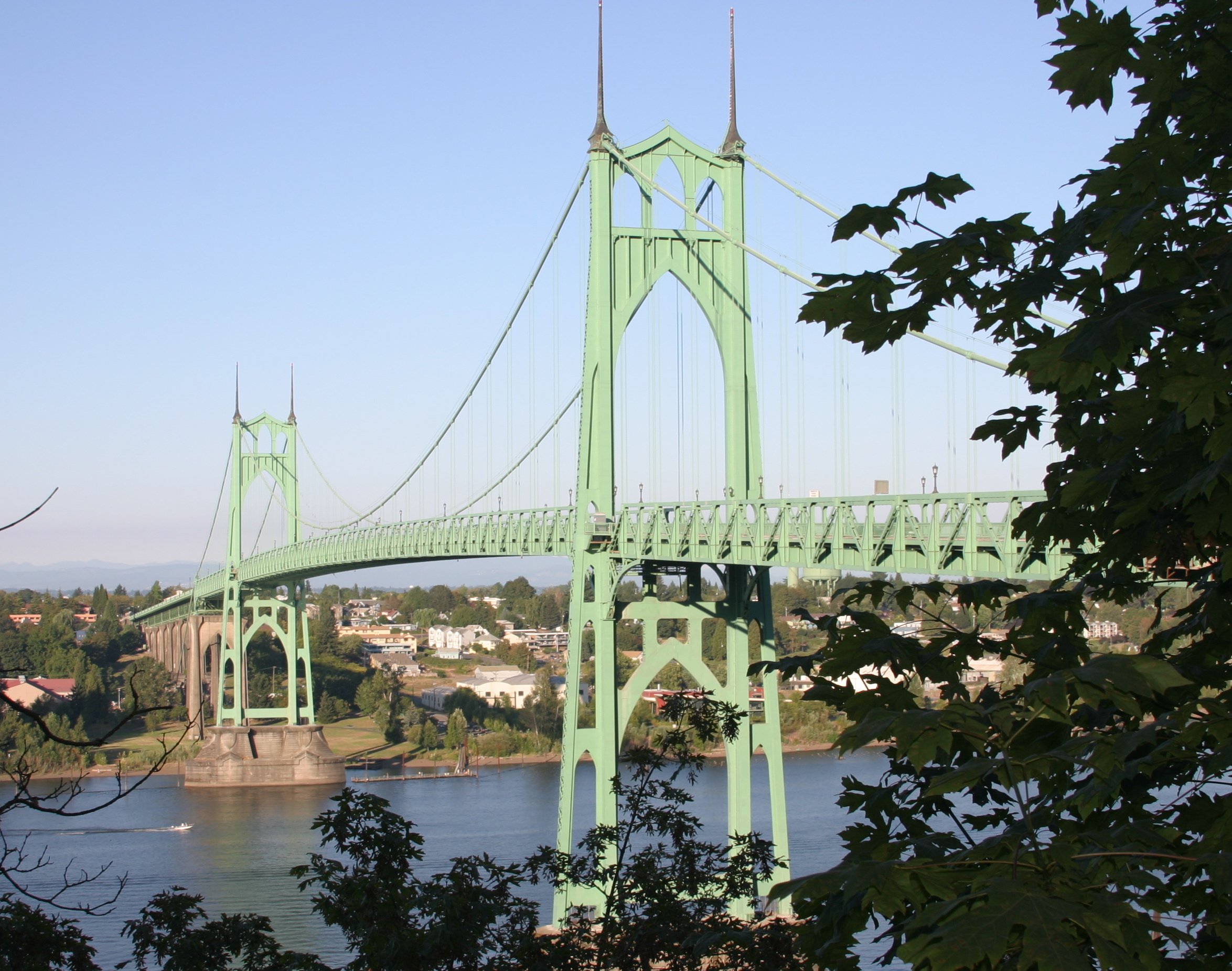
Viewed from the northwest, looking toward St. Johns

The bridge was built within 21 months and $1 million (equivalent to $19 million in 2025) under budget. At the time of its completion, the bridge had

- the highest clearance in the nation,
- the longest prefabricated steel cable rope strands,
- the tallest steel frame piers of reinforced concrete,
- the first application of aviation clearance lights to the towers, and
- longest suspension span west of Detroit, Michigan.

=== Deterioration and present-day maintenance ===
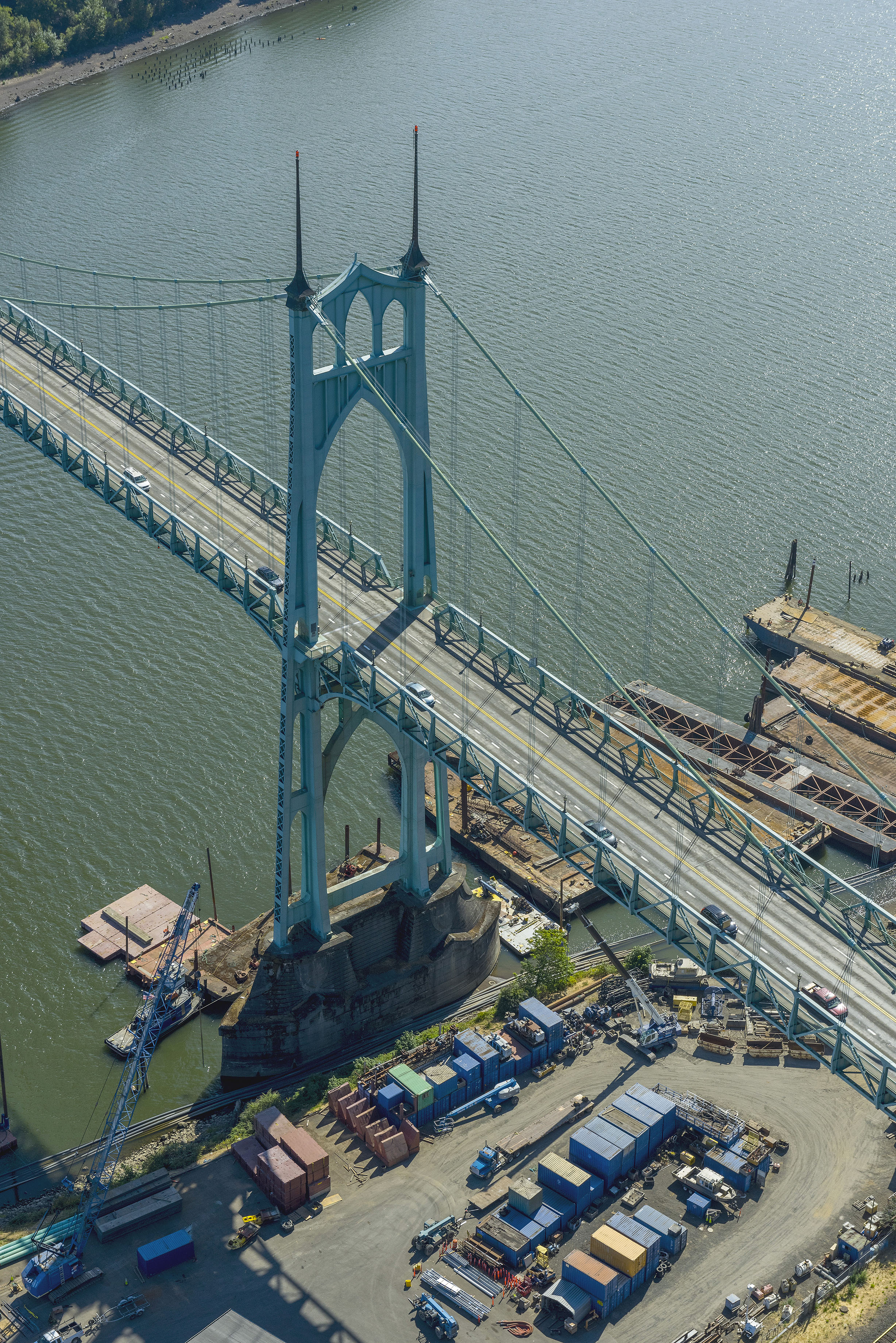
Staging area for repairs of the concrete piers and arches at the west side of the St. Johns Bridge, 2023

By the 1970s, the St. Johns bridge had been allowed to deteriorate and was in need of repainting and various structural repairs. Cash-strapped Multnomah County asked the State of Oregon to assume maintenance. Initially, the state declined, since it was also suffering from financial difficulties, but pressure from an association of county governments forced the state government to take over maintenance of the bridge on August 31, 1975. A county official estimated the move saved Multnomah County $10 million (equivalent to $39 million in 2025) during the first ten years of state maintenance.

Beginning in 1987, portions of the east approaches and east span were repainted, with the project completed in 1994.

In 1999, the Oregon Department of Transportation announced a $27 million rehabilitation project (equivalent to $52 million in 2025) that began in March 2003 and was completed in the fall of 2005. Included in the project were the replacement of the deck, repainting of the towers, waterproofing of the main cables, lighting upgrades, and improving access for bicycle and pedestrian traffic. By November 2004, renovation costs soared to $38 million ($65 million in 2025), due mostly to the need to replace nearly half of the 210 vertical suspender cables. The bridge was completely closed every night for one month. During the 2½ year project, the sidewalks were closed, with no pedestrian access. The newly refurbished bridge was rededicated on September 17, 2006.

In 2022, the Oregon Department of Transportation began a project to repair the bridge's concrete support columns, which had begun to wear away, exposing the internal steel frame. The project is expected to be completed in 2026.

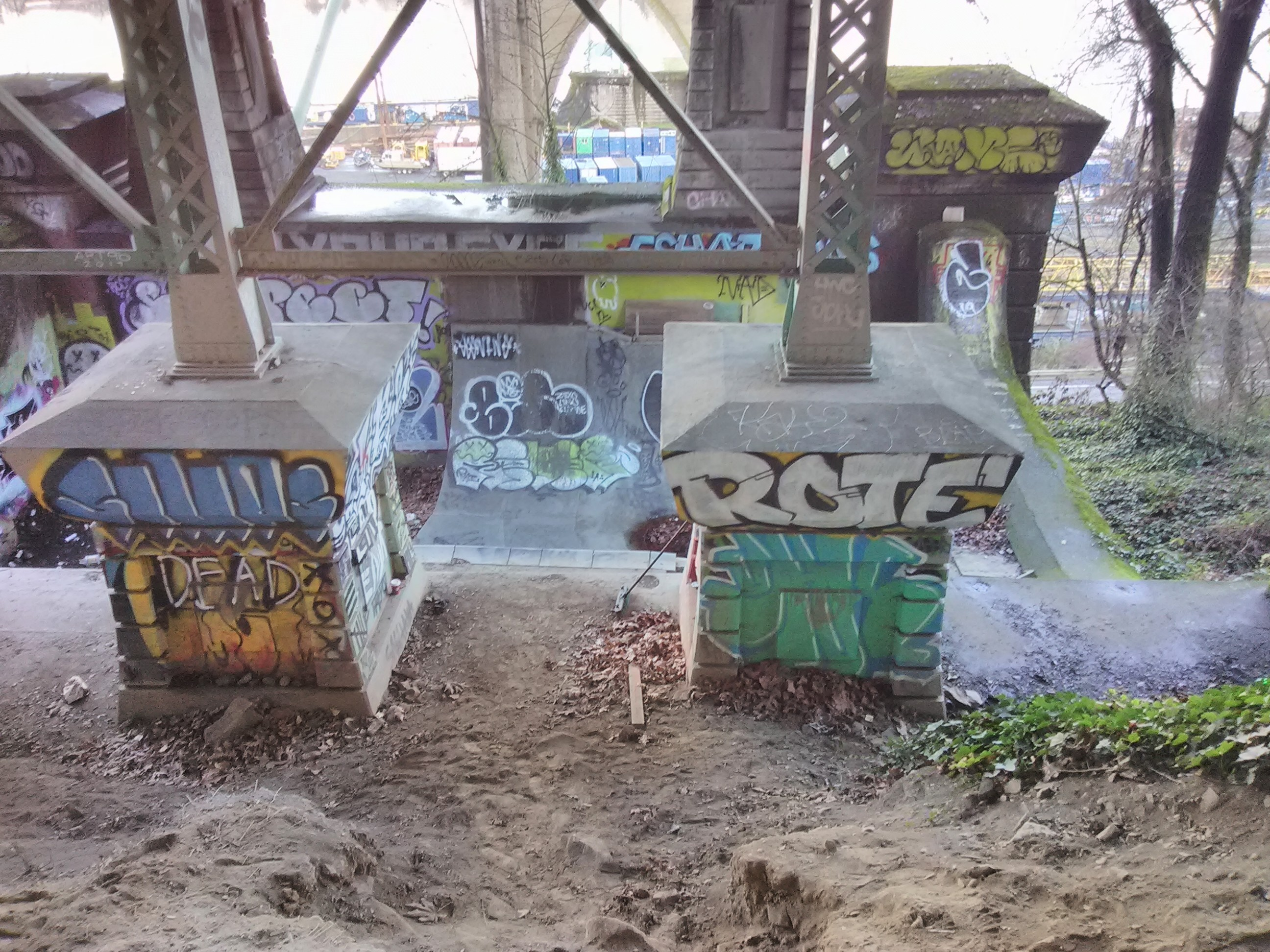
A partially complete illegally built skate park discovered under the St. John's Bridge in 2019. This area was demolished a year later.

=== Other activities at the bridge ===
In July 2015, a group of protesters affiliated with Greenpeace rappelled from the bridge to prevent the icebreaker MSV Fennica from leaving Portland, because it was destined to help Shell Oil Company drill for oil in the Chukchi Sea. They stayed there for forty hours, prompting the icebreaker to turn around after an initial departure attempt a few hours into the blockade. The vessel did eventually get through after three climbers came down, although it was met by dozens of kayakers in the water who joined the effort to slow or stop the ship from moving forward.

In March 2019, an illegally constructed and partially finished skate park was discovered in the bridge's western cable house. Following ODOT's concerns about the skatepark's impacts on the bridge's cable house, it was demolished in 2020.

== See also ==
- List of bridges documented by the Historic American Engineering Record in Oregon
- List of bridges in the United States by height
- List of crossings of the Willamette River
