= Poet's Beach =

Urban beach in Portland, Oregon, U.S.

- Beach
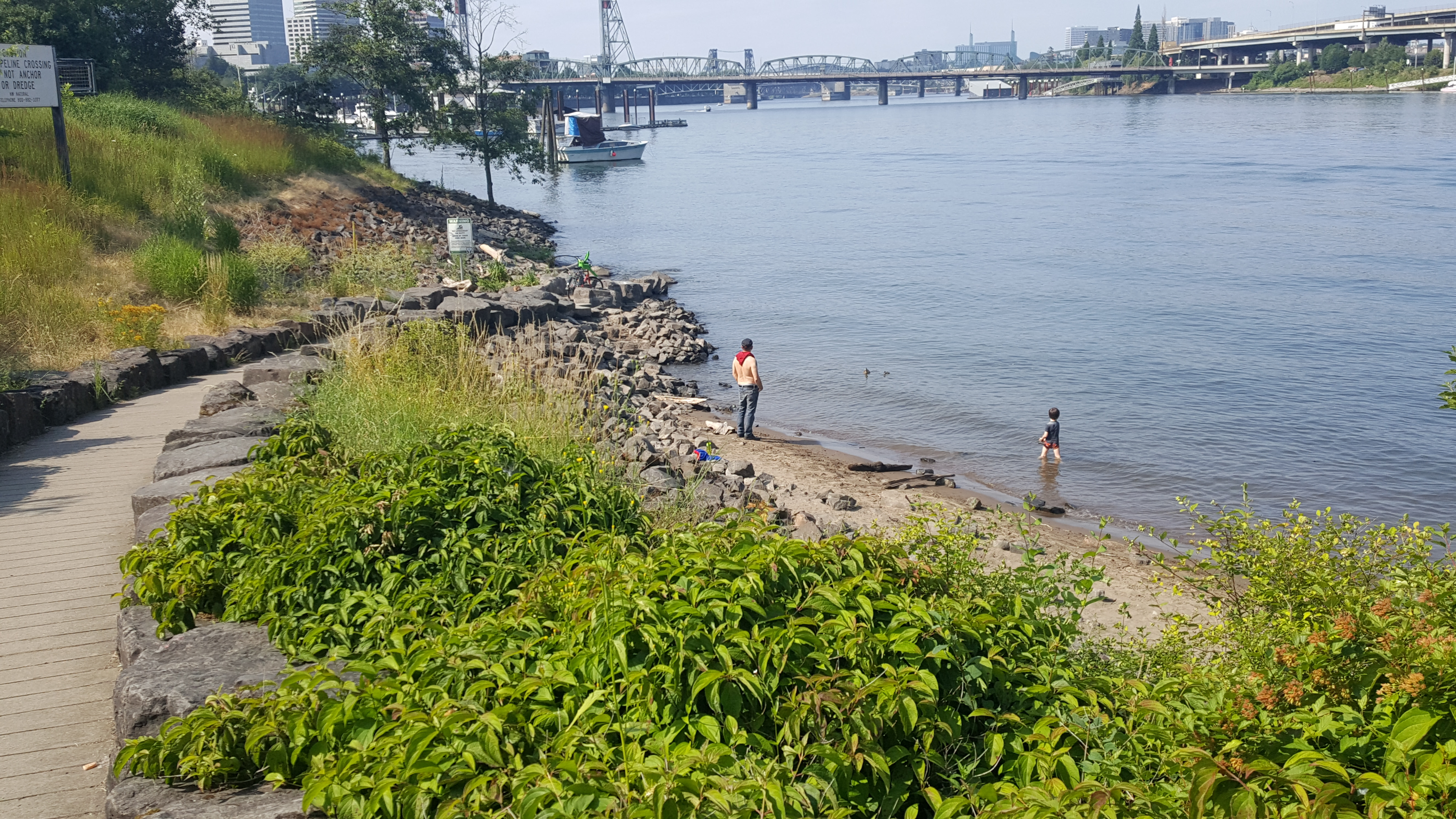
- Part of the beach in 2020

- Location within Portland, Oregon
- Coordinates: 45.507046°N 122.671416°W
- Location: Portland, Oregon, U.S.

Poet's Beach is an urban beach along the Willamette River, near Portland, Oregon's Marquam Bridge, in the United States.

== History ==
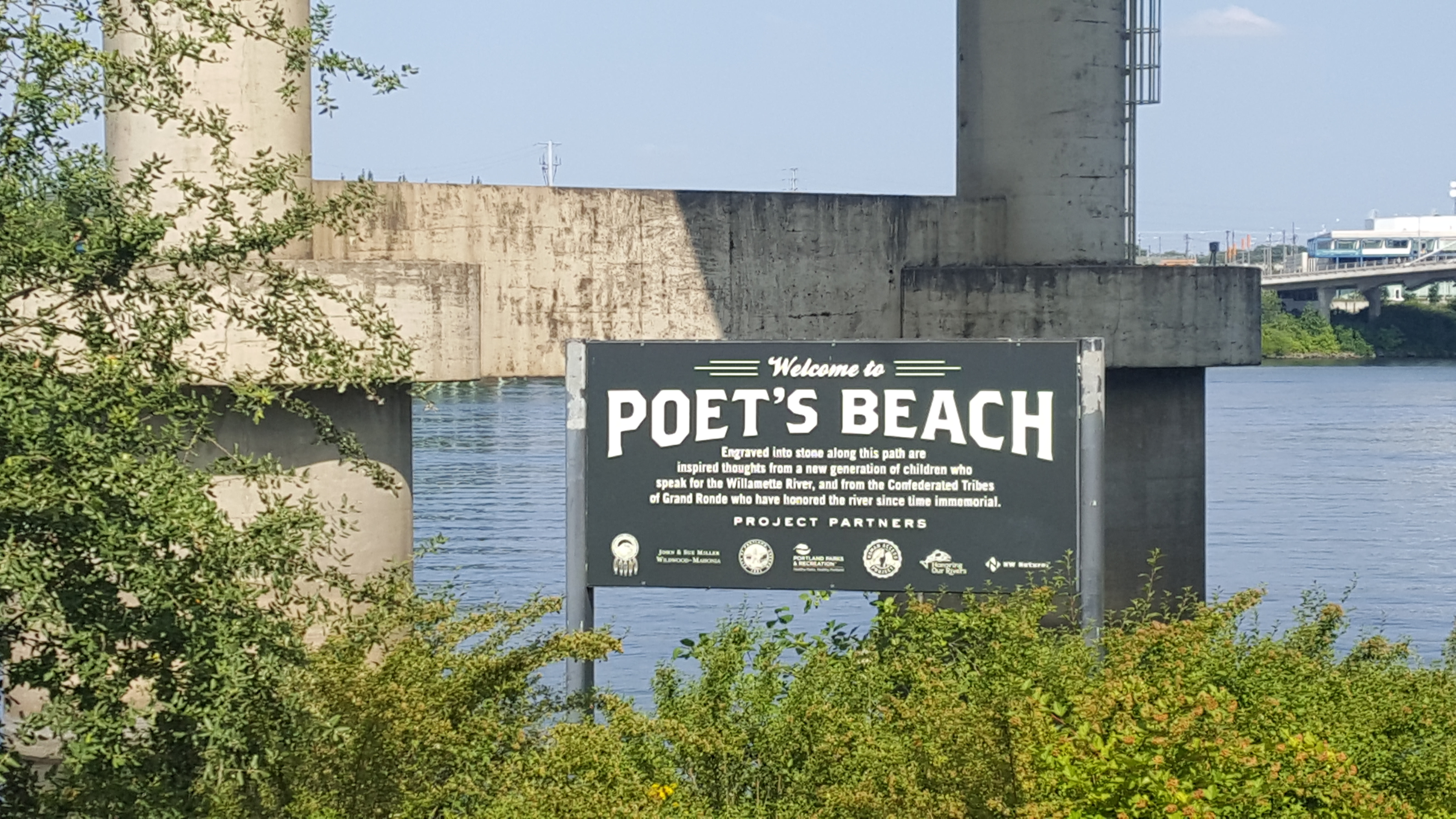
Signage, 2020

The beach was established, along with a kayak launch point, in 2000, but it lacked signage and easy access. The re-imagining of the beach was the brainchild and spearheaded by the volunteer organization Human Access Project (HAP) who starting in 2014, raised funds and obtained permits to improve access to the river.

HAP's work consisted of cutting through basalt rock at the perimeter of the trail near the beach to improve access and adding an art component and signage. The organization collaborated with Honoring our Rivers, who provided 30 excerpts of children's poetry about the Willamette River, and the Confederated Tribes of Grand Ronde, who provided Chinook Jargon with phonetics and English translation. Both of these contributions were engraved into rocks on the path leading to the beach. The completion of these initial improvements received a staged opening by HAP on July 8, 2014.

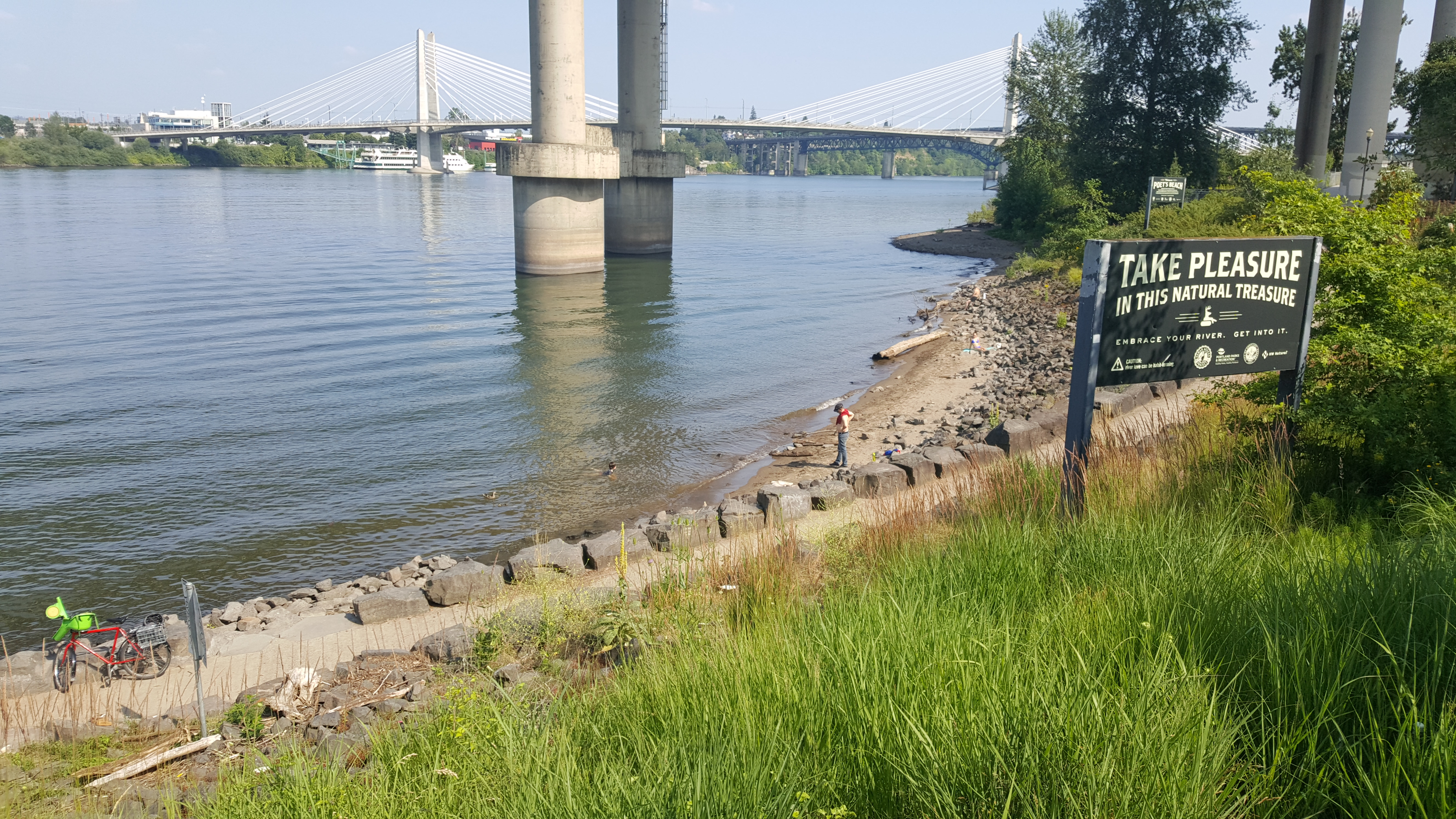
The beach in 2020

In July 2017, Portland mayor Ted Wheeler swam at the beach with a group of other supporters, to draw attention to the addition of lifeguards and to encourage residents to swim at the beach. This opening was characterized as the city's first "pop-up" beach. The pilot swimming program cost $178,000.

In May 2018, the City of Portland announced the Poet's Beach program would continue but without lifeguards.

In July 2022, Portland Parks & Recreation in partnership with HAP named Poet's Beach as one of six safer swimming areas on the Willamette River.

== See also ==
- List of beaches in Oregon
