= Overlook Park =

Overlook Park may refer to:

- Overlook Park (Chino Hills, California)
- Overlook Park (Montgomery, Alabama)
- Overlook Park (Oviedo, Florida)
- Overlook Park (Portland, Oregon)
- Overlook Park station, Portland, Oregon
