= Kenton, Portland, Oregon =

Kenton
- Neighborhood
- Interactive map of Kenton
- Coordinates: 45°35′24″N 122°41′42″W
- Country: United States
- State: Oregon
- City: Portland

Government
  - Association: Kenton Neighborhood Association
  - Coalition: Northeast Coalition of Neighborhoods

Area
  - Total: 3.42 sq mi (8.87 km^{2})

Population (2010)
  - Total: 7,272
  - Density: 2,120/sq mi (820/km^{2})

Housing
  - No. of households: 2,707
  - Occupancy rate: 94% occupied
  - Owner-occupied: 1,792 households (66%)
  - Renting: 915 households (34%)
  - Avg. household size: 2.56 persons

Kenton is a neighborhood in the north section of Portland, Oregon, United States. The neighborhood was originally a company town founded in 1911 for the Swift Meat Packing Company.

== Geography ==
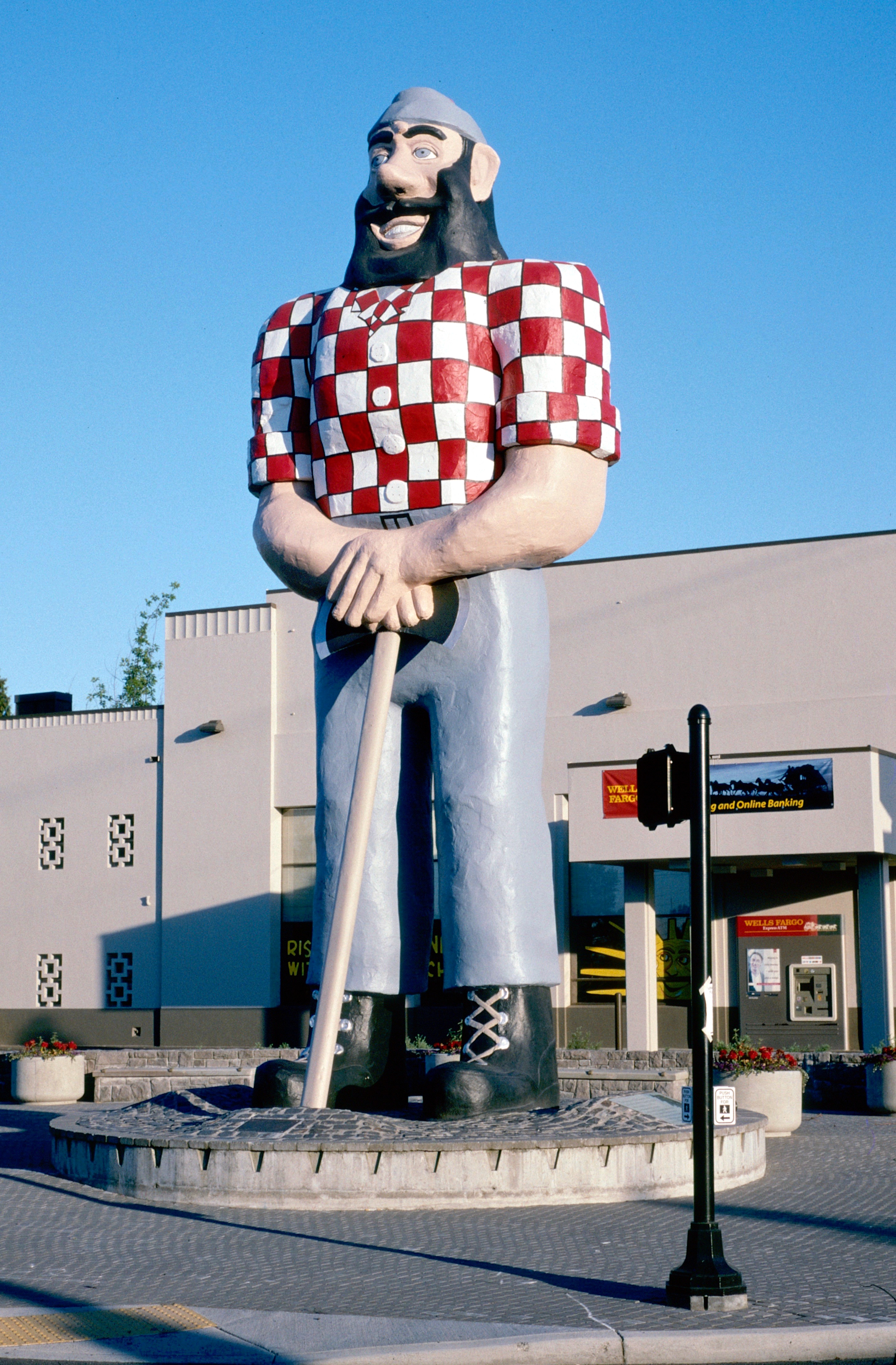
The statue of Paul Bunyan, a Kenton landmark

Kenton's northern border is formed by North Portland Harbor, the channel of the Columbia River that separates the area from Hayden Island. Kenton's eastern boundary is Interstate 5 and the neighborhood's southern edge is defined by North Lombard Street. The western border (traveling from north to south, respectively) follows North Portland Road, North Columbia Boulevard, and North Chautauqua Boulevard. The Columbia Slough passes through Kenton.

Neighborhoods bordering Kenton are: Hayden Island to the north; Bridgeton, Sunderland, and Piedmont to the east; Arbor Lodge to the south; University Park to the southwest; and Portsmouth and St. Johns to the west.

Kenton is home to the Portland International Raceway and the Portland Metropolitan Expo Center. The historic site of Vanport, a public housing project built to provide homes for World War II shipbuilders, later destroyed by a 1948 flood, is also located within the current boundaries of the Kenton neighborhood.

== History ==
Before the 1900s, Kenton was a farming community similar to other townships in the area like University Park and St. Johns until it became a company town built by the Swift Meat Packing Company. By 1910, US$120,000 worth of buildings had been erected in the neighborhood with many fashioned out of concrete and brick. Two three-story brick hotels were built in Kenton in 1910. Plants from companies like the National Wood Pipe Company, Davis Safe and Lock Company, Union Meat Company and Portland Union Stockyards called Kenton home. A concrete apartment building was built by C. H. Carey costing US$22,000. In 1909, Portland, Oregon Mayor Joseph Simon took an automobile trip to Kenton where he announced general improvements for the community like road pavement, street lamps and a fire station. The streets were still dirt in 1910, leading the Kenton Push Club to lobby the Portland City Council to pass a bond to pave the roads. After a long fight with the city council, the roads were paved in 1911. By 1913, US$300,000 had been spent on paving the streets of Kenton. The growing community soon demanded a park, library and schoolhouse. Just a few years later, Kenton was annexed with St. Johns by the City of Portland, becoming home to Portland's main stockyards and the center of the West Coast cattle trade for a time.

A story of the "Kenton ghost" was published in the January 5, 1913, edition of The Oregonian which recounted several residents accounts of a shadowy figure lurking the streets of the community. Several prominent citizens came forward with their own sightings of the ghost including the secretary of the Interstate Bridge Commission. Former Albina, Oregon Mayor W. M. Killingsworth led a group of people who looked for the ghost. Kenton had a semi-professional baseball team in 1916 and 1917. The Kenton Giants played in the Inter-City League with three other teams.

The 1959 Oregon Centennial celebrations were held in Kenton. To commemorate the occasion, a large statue of Paul Bunyan was built at the intersection of North Interstate Avenue and North Argyle Street (just north of Kenton's historic business district on North Denver Avenue) as a reminder of centennial festivities. The statue still stands at the corner of North Interstate and North Denver, across from the Kenton/North Denver Avenue station, and is considered a symbol of the neighborhood. The statue was added to the National Register of Historic Places on January 28, 2009. Directly across N Denver Ave from the Paul Bunyan Statue are the four blue hooves of Babe the Blue Ox, his trusted animal companion.

The Kenton Commercial Historic District was listed on the National Register of Historic Places in 2001 for its role in the development of the neighborhood and the city.

== Notable people ==
- Tina Kotek – 39th Governor of Oregon, Kenton resident since 2005
