= Columbia Park (disambiguation) =

Columbia Park was a baseball stadium in Philadelphia, U.S.

Columbia Park may also refer to the following places in the U.S.:

- Columbia Park, Torrance, California, a park
- Columbia Park, Minneapolis, a neighborhood in Northeast
- Columbia Park (Portland, Oregon), a park
- Columbia Park (Altoona), Pennsylvania, a former baseball field
- Columbia Park (Tri-Cities), Washington, a park comprising Columbia Park East and Columbia Park West
- Columbia Park (Marshfield, Wisconsin), a park
- Columbia Park (Seattle), a park in the Columbia City neighborhood of Seattle, WA.
