= Overlook, Portland, Oregon =

Overlook
- Neighborhood
- Location in Portland
- Coordinates: 45°33′22″N 122°41′34″W
- Country: United States
- State: Oregon
- City: Portland

Government
  - Association: Overlook Neighborhood Association
  - Coalition: Northeast Coalition of Neighborhoods

Area
  - Total: 3.31 sq mi (8.58 km^{2})

Population (2000)
  - Total: 6,093
  - Density: 1,840/sq mi (710/km^{2})

Housing
  - No. of households: 2462
  - Occupancy rate: 95% occupied
  - Owner-occupied: 1646 households (67%)
  - Renting: 816 households (33%)
  - Avg. household size: 2.47 persons

Overlook is a neighborhood in the North section of Portland, Oregon on the east shore of the Willamette River. It borders University Park and Arbor Lodge on the north, Humboldt and Boise on the east, Eliot on the southeast, and Northwest Industrial and the Northwest District across the Willamette on the west.

It is home to Adidas' North American headquarters.

== Features ==
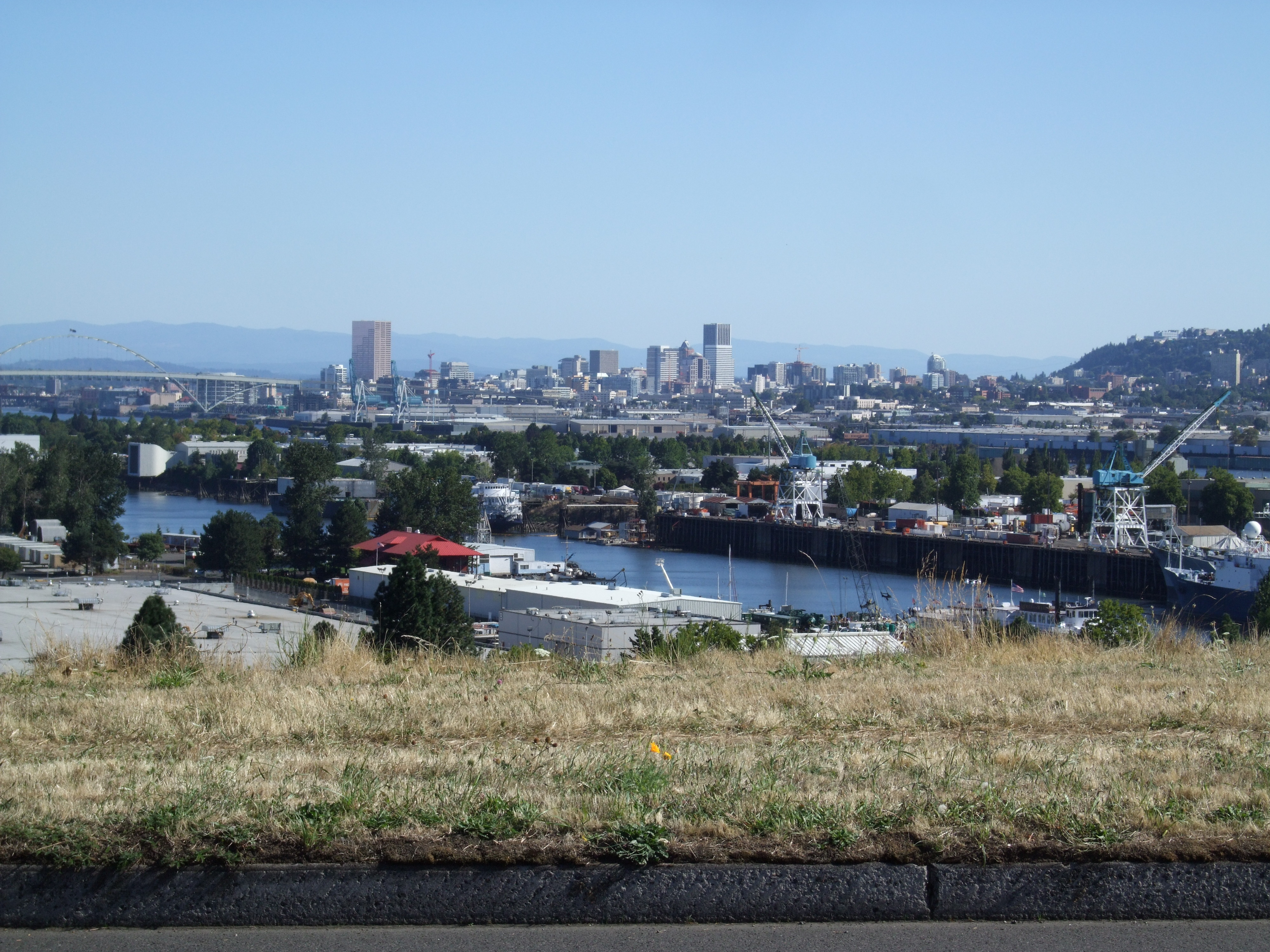
Downtown Portland with Swan Island in the foreground

The Overlook Park station, the North Prescott Street station, and the North Killingsworth Street station on the MAX Yellow Line provide light rail service to the neighborhood.

Overlook House (1928) serves as a community center. The Interstate Firehouse Cultural Center, next to Patton Park, features arts education, exhibits and theater.

The neighborhood includes Swan Island, originally an island in the Willamette. In 1899, Richard McCrary, James Connor, and Hi Straight set up a moonshine still on Swan Island. The island was connected to the east bank by landfill in the 1920s. Swan Island was the site of Portland's first airport, Swan Island Municipal Airport, dedicated by Charles Lindbergh in 1927 and operating until the early 1940s when the island was converted to naval shipbuilding use for World War II as one of the Kaiser Shipyards. Swan Island is now an industrial area.

The Overlook Neighborhood Association is the official neighborhood association recognized by the city.

== See also ==
- E. Henry Wemme, a Portland businessman credited with contributing to the development of the neighborhood
