= Overlook Park station =

Light rail station in Portland, Oregon, US

Overlook Park
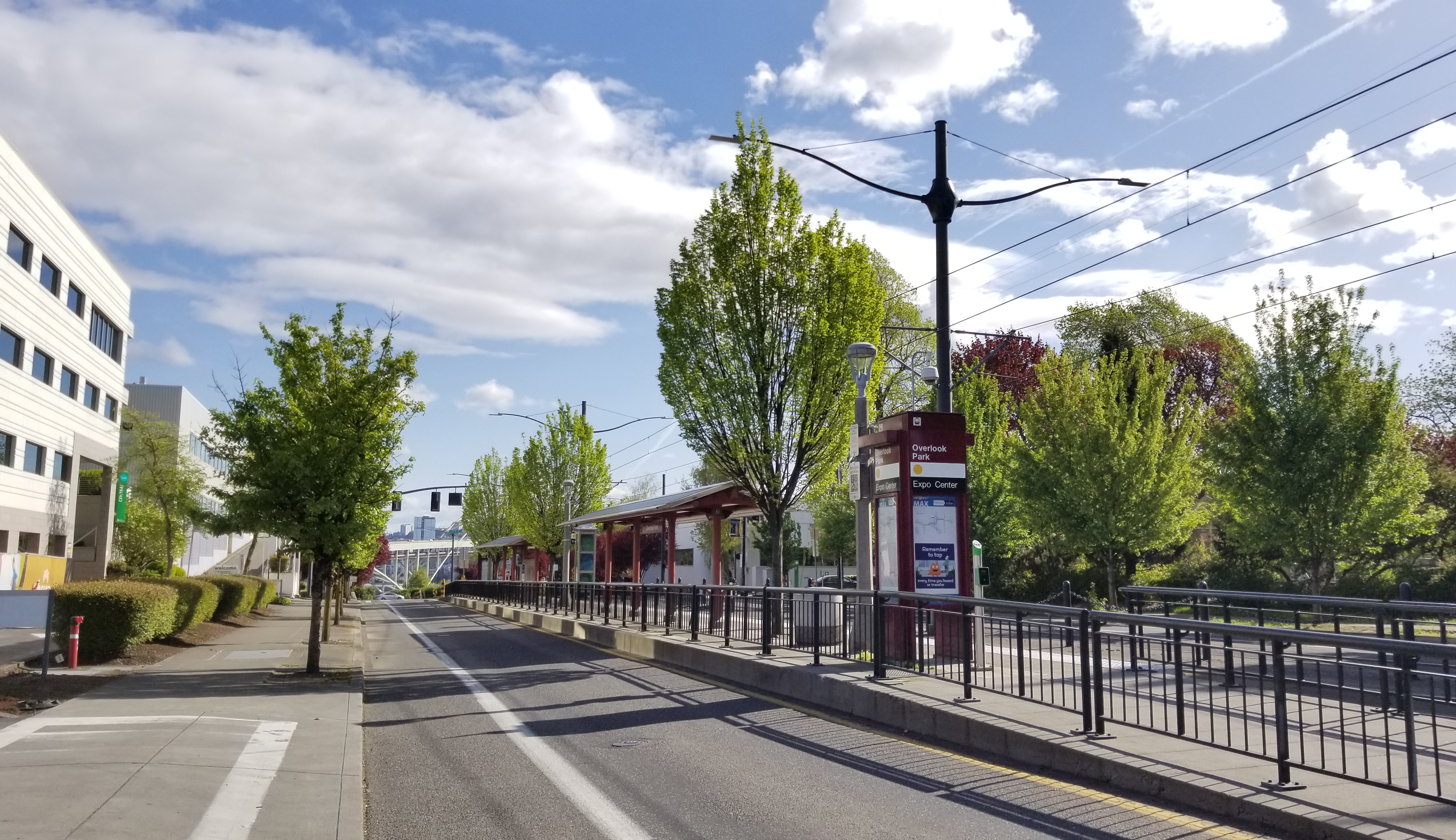
- The station's northbound platform in 2019

General information
- Location: Portland, Oregon
- Coordinates: 45°32′55″N 122°40′52″W
- Owner: TriMet
- Line: Yellow Line
- Platforms: 2 staggered side platforms
- Tracks: 2

Construction
- Structure type: At-grade
- Cycle facilities: Reserved bike lockers
- Accessible: Yes

History
- Opened: May 1, 2004

Passengers
- Fall 2018: 557 weekday boardings

Services
Preceding station	TriMet	Following station
Albina/Mississippi toward Union Station/NW 5th & Glisan	Yellow Line	North Prescott Street toward Expo Center
Location

Overlook Park station is a light rail station in Portland, Oregon, United States, served by TriMet as part of the MAX Light Rail system. It is the eighth southbound station on the Yellow Line, which operates between North Portland, downtown Portland and Portland State University. The staggered side platform station is located between the intersections of North Fremont Street and Overlook Boulevard along the median of North Interstate Avenue, near the Interstate Medical Offices of Kaiser Permanente and a park with the same name.

Overlook Park station is one of three stations serving North Portland's Overlook neighborhood along with the N Prescott St and N Killingsworth St stations. It opened on May 1, 2004, as part of the 5.8-mile (9.3 km) Interstate MAX extension. Trains serve the station for approximately 21 hours per day on a headway of 15 minutes during most of the day.

== History ==
In 1999, local residents and business leaders urged Portland's regional transit agency, TriMet, to extend the Metropolitan Area Express (MAX) through North Portland. The extension, approved in June of that year, came to be referred to as the Interstate MAX. In February 2000, the Portland City Council authorized the relocation of Overlook Park station's planned northbound platform closer to the main entrance of Kaiser Permanente's medical offices, despite hospital officials expressing a preference to shift both platforms closer to benefit patients. Construction of the Interstate MAX began in February 2001 near the Rose Quarter. Overlook Park station opened on May 1, 2004, along with Yellow Line service.

== Station details ==
Overlook Park station is situated at-grade along the median of North Interstate Avenue, between the intersections of Fremont Street and Overlook Boulevard. It is the first of three stations going northbound serving the Overlook neighborhood; the other two are North Prescott Street and North Killingsworth Street. The station features two staggered side platforms, which are accessible via crosswalks at the ends of each platform. Its platforms consist of shelters, benches, garbage cans, ticket vending machines, and passenger information displays. Reserved bike lockers nearby may be rented in six-month increments.

=== Public art ===
TriMet commissioned artist Fernanda D'Agostino to design the station's public artwork, which pays homage to nature, healing, and the Overlook neighborhood's Polish roots. Her work, entitled Icons of Transformation, comprises two light towers and windscreens installed on the station platforms. The light towers, modeled after Polish wayside shrines, feature portraits of community members overlaid with images of nature. The windscreen art glass suggests "the transforming power of nature". A community map by artist Margaret Eccles depicts a shaft of wheat with roots interweaving a street grid and adorned with glass-block medical drawings derived from ancient Islamic, Chinese, and Medieval European cultures. The artist intended for this piece to convey a symbol of good health and longevity.

=== Service ===
Overlook Park station is situated between the Albina/Mississippi and North Prescott Street stations on the Interstate MAX segment of MAX Light Rail. It is eighth station southbound on the Yellow Line, which runs from the station northbound to the Expo Center and southbound through the Rose Quarter and the Portland Transit Mall to the PSU South stations at Portland State University. At Portland Union Station, most southbound Yellow Line trains operate through into the Orange Line and continue to Southeast Park Avenue station in Milwaukie. Trains serve the station for approximately 21 hours per day every day of the week. The headway between trains measures 15 minutes during most of the day and up to 30 minutes in the early mornings and late evenings. From the station, trains take 17 minutes to reach Expo Center station and 10 minutes to reach Union Station/Northwest 5th & Glisan station. Overlook Park station averaged 557 riders per day on weekdays in fall 2018.
