= Lucky Labrador Brewing Company =

Brewery in Portland, Oregon, U.S.

- Logo

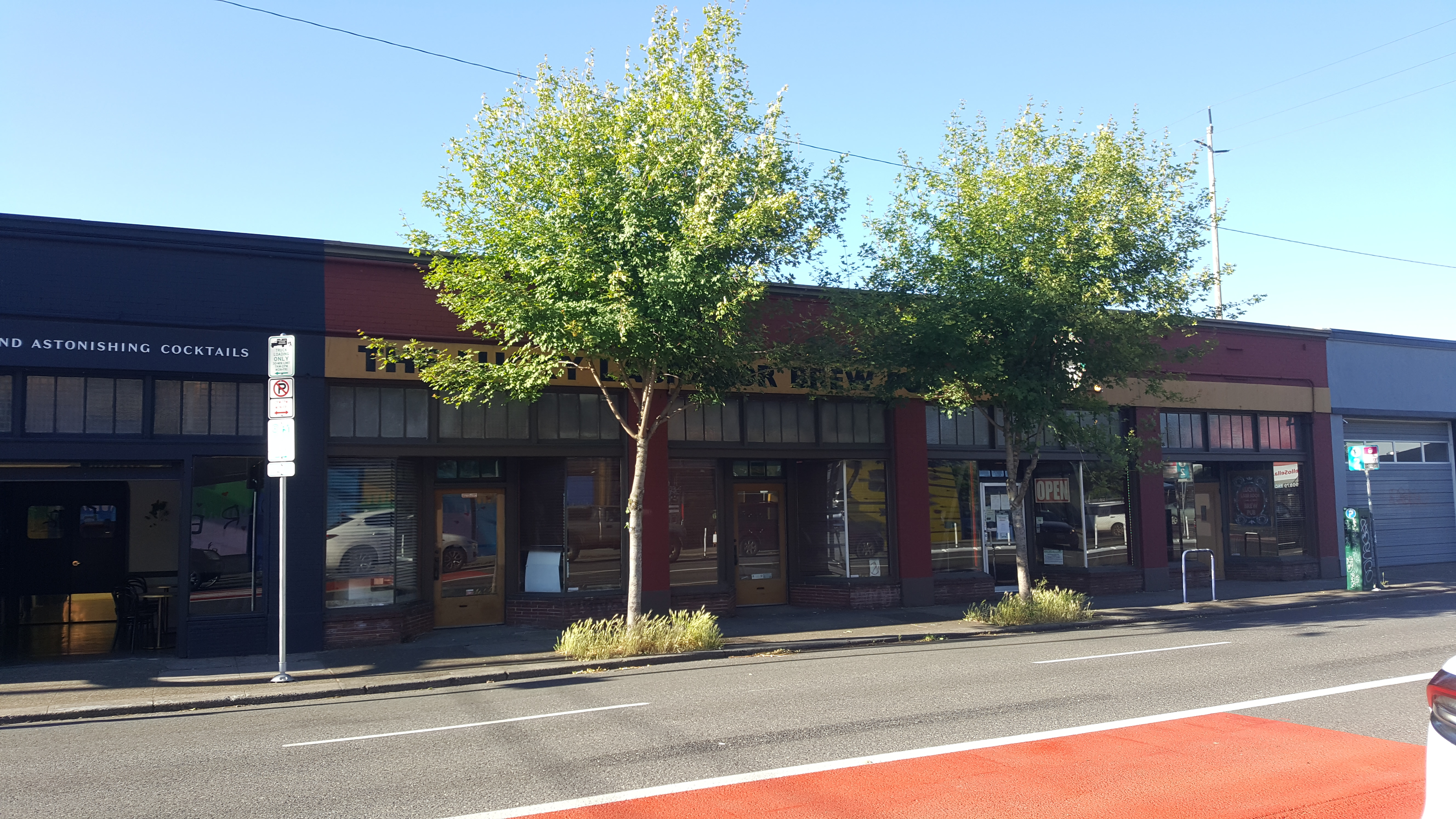
- Exterior of the southeast Portland location, 2021
- Location: Portland, Oregon, United States
- Coordinates: 45.51244°N 122.65640°W
- Owned by: Gary Geist (Co-owner)

Lucky Labrador Brewing Company, often referred to as Lucky Lab, is a brewery based in Portland, Oregon, United States. The business was established in 1994. Gary Geist is a co-owner. The brewery became the first in Oregon to use solar power for brewing.

== Locations ==
There have been multiple locations in Portland. The original pub is on Hawthorne Boulevard in southeast Portland's Buckman neighborhood. Another is in southwest Portland's Multnomah Village. A third is located in northwest Portland's Northwest District neighborhood. In December 2022, the business announced plans to close the location at 1700 North Killingsworth Street in the Overlook neighborhood.

== See also ==
- Brewing in Oregon
