= Arbor Lodge =

Arbor Lodge may refer to:

- Arbor Lodge State Historical Park and Arboretum in Nebraska City, Nebraska
- Arbor Lodge, Portland, Oregon, a neighborhood of Portland, Oregon
