= Kenton/N Denver Ave station =

Light rail station in Portland, Oregon, U.S.

Kenton/N Denver Ave
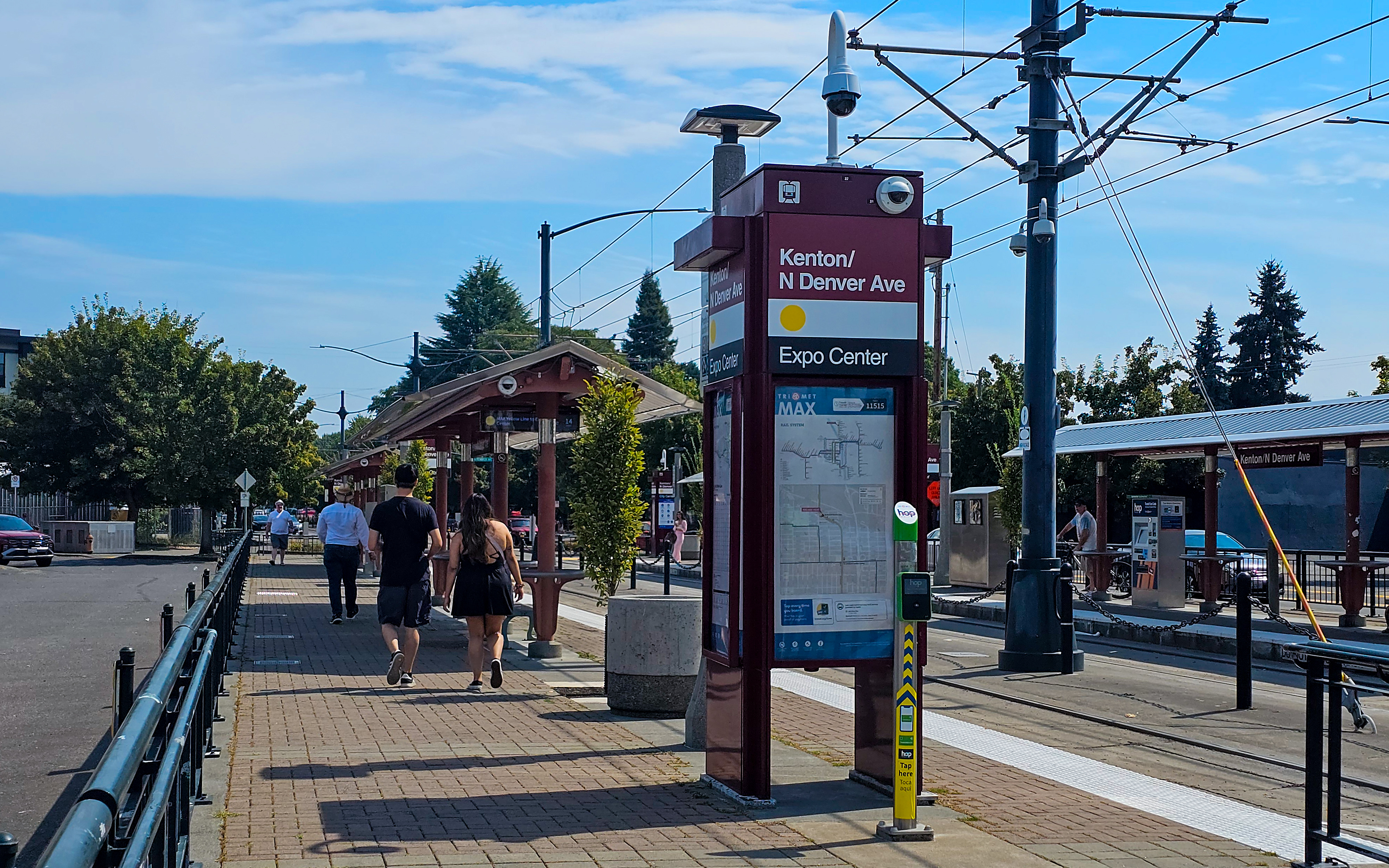
- The northbound platform, facing south

General information
- Location: 8399 N. Interstate Avenue; Portland, Oregon; USA
- Coordinates: 45°35′02″N 122°41′09″W
- Owner: TriMet
- Platforms: split platform
- Tracks: 2

Construction
- Cycle facilities: Bike lockers
- Accessible: yes

History
- Opened: May 1, 2004

Services
Preceding station	TriMet	Following station
North Lombard Transit Center toward Union Station/NW 5th & Glisan	Yellow Line	Delta Park/Vanport toward Expo Center
Location

Kenton/North Denver Avenue is a light rail station on the MAX Yellow Line in Portland, Oregon. It is the 8th stop northbound on the Interstate Avenue MAX extension.

The station is located on the shoulder of Interstate Avenue near the intersection with North Argyle and Denver Streets. The station is a side platform configuration.

The artwork at this station reflects the historic Kenton neighborhood which it serves. Themes include the area's historic stockyards. A large Paul Bunyan Statue, listed on the National Register of Historic Places, is located across the street from the station.

This station is the final stop on Interstate Avenue before the Yellow Line continues to the Expo Center on the Vanport Bridge, passing over Union Pacific railroad tracks, Columbia Boulevard, and the Columbia Slough.
