= Arbor Lodge Park =

Public park in Portland, Oregon, U.S.

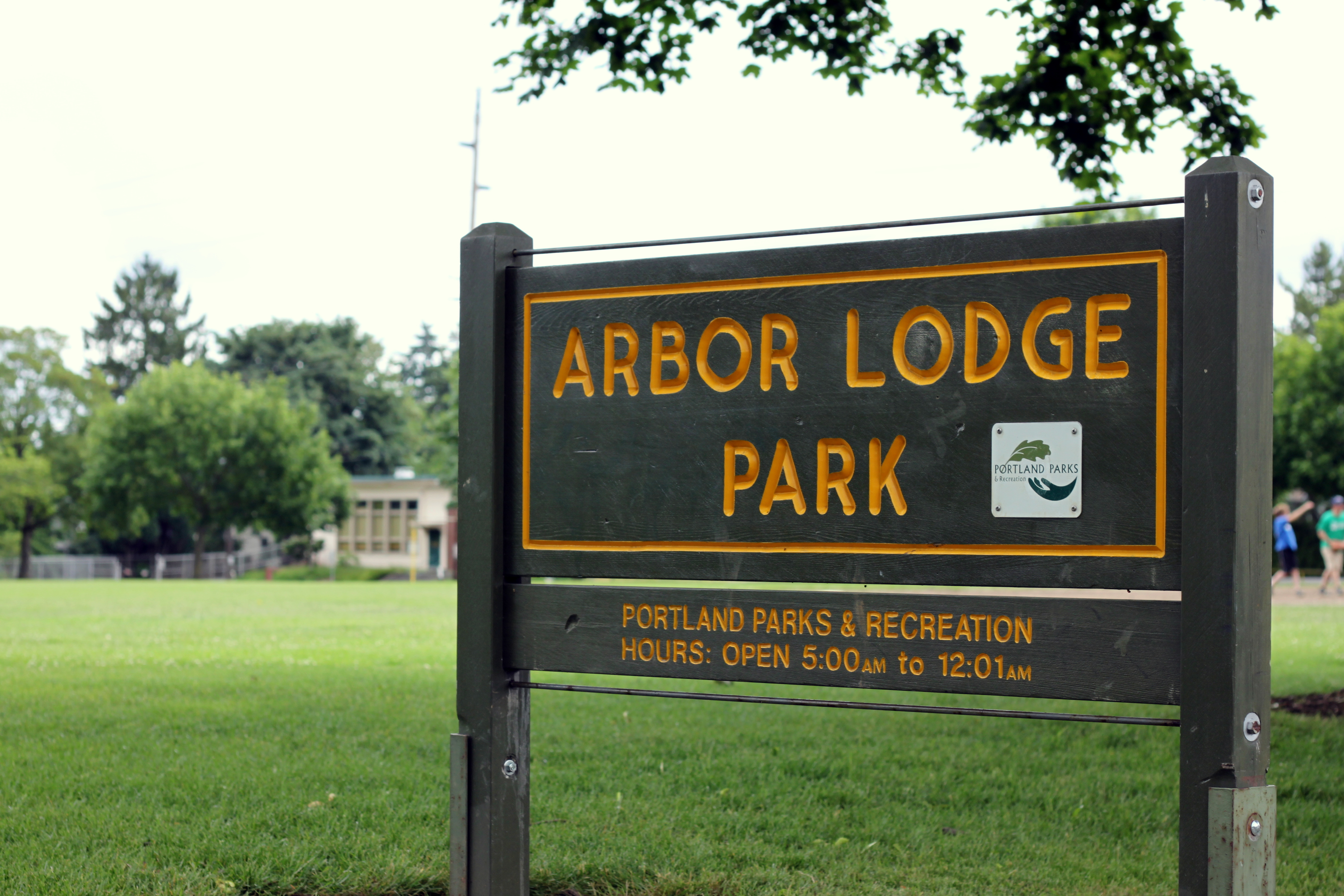
- Park signage, 2009
- Interactive map of Arbor Lodge Park
- Location: N Bryant St. and Delaware Ave. Portland, Oregon
- Coordinates: 45.5728°N 122.6938°W
- Area: 8.4 acres (3.4 ha)
- Created: 1940
- Operator: Portland Parks & Recreation

Arbor Lodge Park is a public park in north Portland, Oregon's Arbor Lodge neighborhood, in the United States. The 8.69-acre (3.52 ha) park was acquired in 1940.

== See also ==
- List of parks in Portland, Oregon
