= N Prescott St station =

Light rail station in Portland, Oregon, U.S.

N Prescott Street
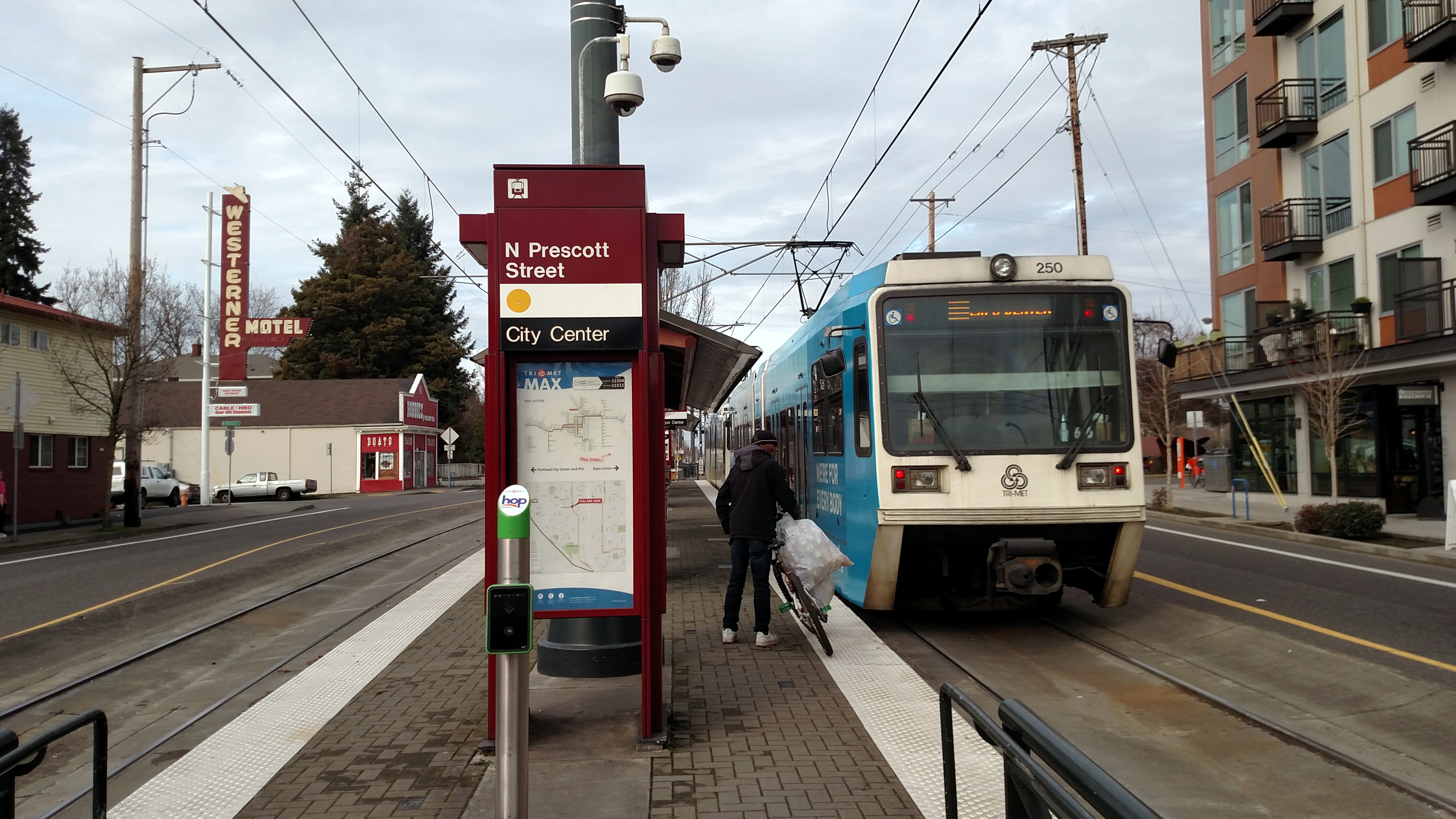
- Northbound train at North Prescott Street station in 2018

General information
- Location: 4498 North Interstate Ave; Portland, Oregon; USA
- Coordinates: 45°33′19″N 122°40′56″W
- Owner: TriMet
- Platforms: island platform
- Tracks: 2

Construction
- Cycle facilities: Bike lockers
- Accessible: yes

Other information
- Fare zone: none

History
- Opened: May 1, 2004

Services
Preceding station	TriMet	Following station
Overlook Park toward Union Station/NW 5th & Glisan	Yellow Line	North Killingsworth Street toward Expo Center
Location

North Prescott Street is a light rail station on the MAX Yellow Line in Portland, Oregon. It is the 4th stop northbound on the Interstate MAX extension.

The station is located in the median of Interstate Avenue near the intersection of N Going Street. The station is a center platform, with its main artistic theme drawing upon the nearby shipping industry at Swan Island and the environment.
