= Arbor Lodge, Portland, Oregon =

Neighborhood in Portland, Oregon, U.S.

Arbor Lodge
- Neighborhood
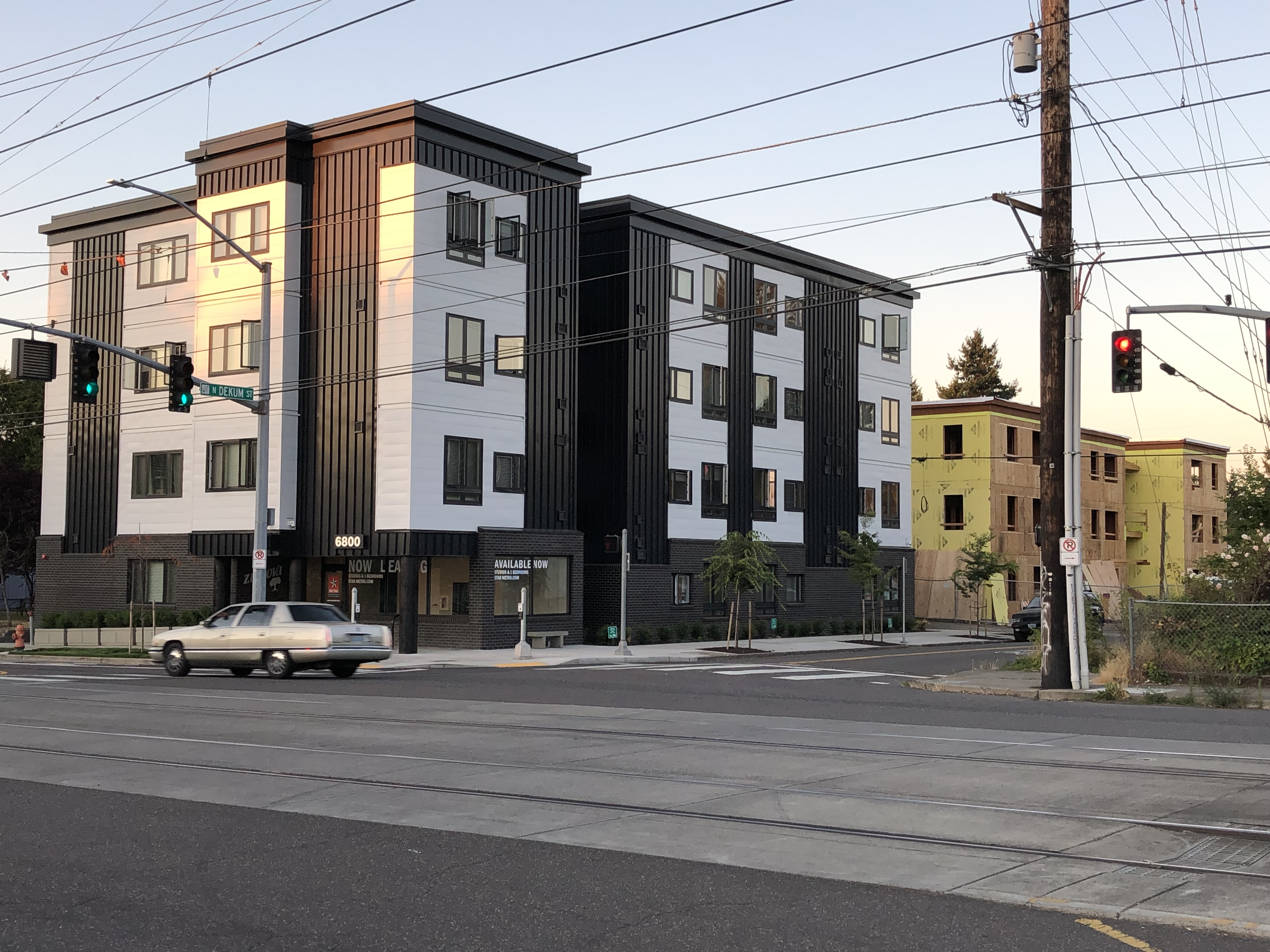
- Intersection of Dekum Street and Interstate Avenue in Arbor Lodge
- Interactive map of Arbor Lodge
- Coordinates: 45°34′25″N 122°41′33″W
- Country: United States
- State: Oregon
- City: Portland

Government
  - Association: Arbor Lodge Neighborhood Association
  - Coalition: Northeast Coalition of Neighborhoods

Area
  - Total: 0.87 sq mi (2.25 km^{2})

Population (2020)
  - Total: 6,946
  - Density: 7,984/sq mi (3,083/km^{2})

Housing
  - No. of households: 3042
  - Occupancy rate: 92.6% occupied
  - Owner-occupied: 1872 households (73%)
  - Renting: 701 households (27%)
  - Avg. household size: 2.3 persons

Arbor Lodge is a neighborhood in the North section of Portland, Oregon. Interstate 5 forms the eastern boundary of the neighborhood. The south boundary is formed by Ainsworth Street, the west boundary is formed by a combination of Willamette Boulevard and Chataqua Boulevard, and the north boundary is formed by Lombard Street. The bordering neighborhoods are Piedmont to the east, Overlook to the south, University Park to the west, and Kenton to the north.

The North Lombard Transit Center and the Rosa Parks stations on the MAX Yellow Line provide light rail service to the neighborhood. Their opening in 2004 was part of a spurt of new development in the neighborhood, including a New Seasons Market and a Fred Meyer mega-store.

The neighborhood is the location of Arbor Lodge Park, which includes Portland's first accessible playground, Harper's Playground, constructed in 2012.

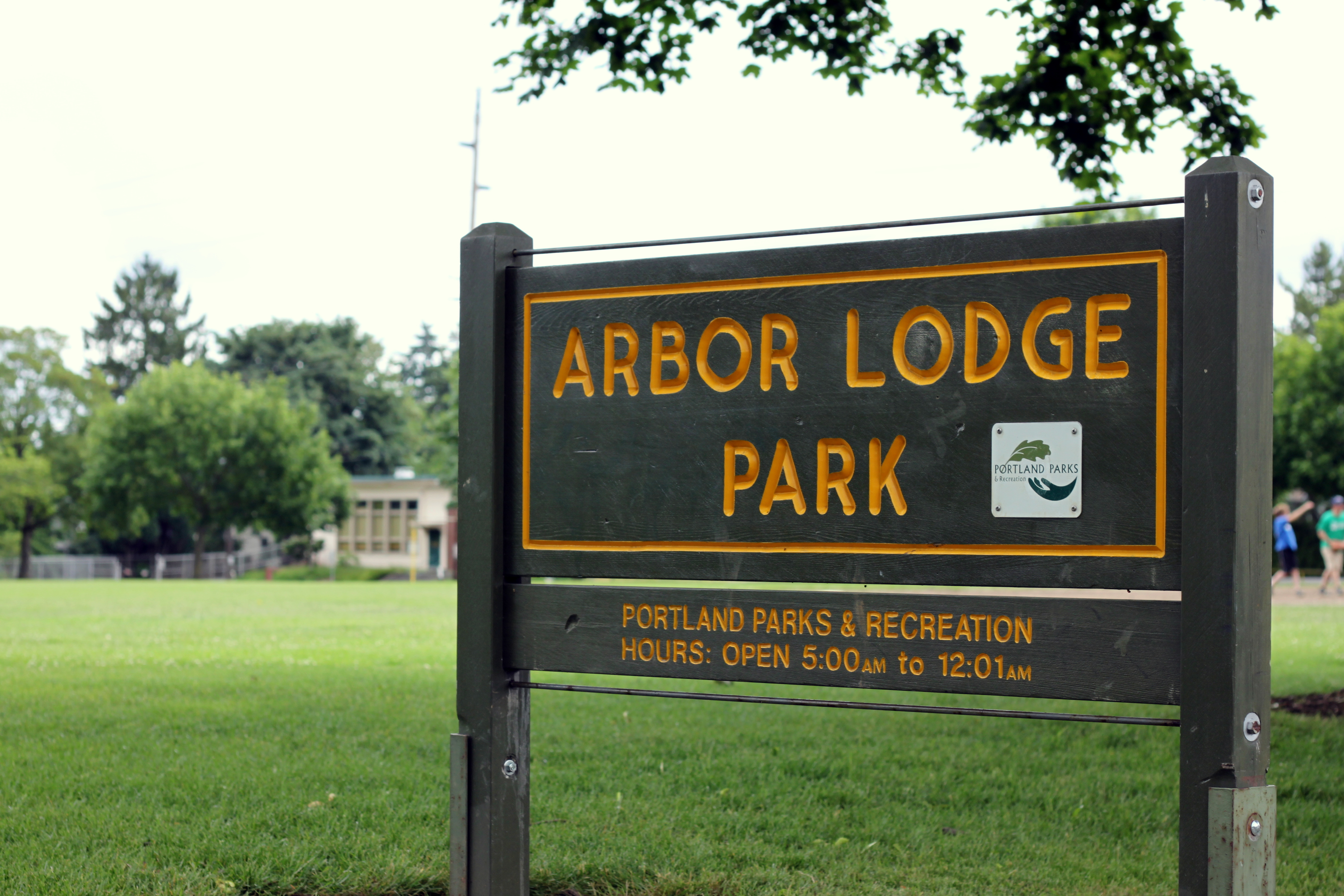
Arbor Lodge Park with Chief Joseph Elementary School in the background

== History ==
Arbor Lodge was platted on April 15, 1889 by Duff E. Sherman, an Oregon National Bank of Portland cashier, and most of its homes were built between 1910 and 1930.

== Demographics ==
In 2020, 6,946 people lived in Arbor Lodge, a 13% increase from 6,153 in 2010, itself a 1% increase from 6,065 in 2000.

In 2020, 72% people identified as white alone, 8.7% as Hispanic or Latino, 6.5% as Asian, 5.9% as Black or African American, 3.2% as American Indian or Alaskan Native, 1.1% as Native Hawaiian or Pacific Islander, and 8.3% as some other race. The median household income was listed as $107,000 and tree canopy cover was 20%.
