= Oregon Centennial =

The Oregon Centennial was the 100th anniversary of the statehood of the U.S. state of Oregon. The day of the anniversary was February 14, 1959, but centennial events took place throughout the year. Festivities were held all over the state, with the major attractions at the Oregon Centennial Exposition and International Trade Fair, located at the Expo Center in Portland's Kenton neighborhood, which took place from June 10 to September 17, 1959.

The chief dramatic event of the Oregon Centennial Exposition was the presentation of The Oregon Story at the Exposition Arena, a spectacular featuring more than 700 actors, the Hollywood Bowl Ballet and the Portland Symphonic Choir. Music was composed by Meredith Willson with the production directed by Vladimir Rosing.

Entertainment included Roy Rogers & Dale Evans, Lawrence Welk, Harry Belafonte, and Art Linkletter's House Party broadcast on CBS. The exposition's theme was "Frontier of the Future". Centennial-related events and attractions included a play, a musical, parades, specially commissioned artworks by muralist Carl Morris, and a railroad line that used two trains built for the Portland Zoo Railway (now the Washington Park and Zoo Railway). Local communities created monuments to celebrate the anniversary, including a totem pole located at the Oregon Zoo and a huge statue of Paul Bunyan in Kenton. Many communities had to raise money to finance their celebration plans. One method used to raise funds was the sale of Oregon Centennial Tokens. Many private companies also created Centennial items for sale. In 2009, the state celebrated the Oregon Sesquicentennial, also known as "Oregon 150".

== See also ==
- Lewis and Clark Centennial Exposition
