= Voices of Remembrance =

Art installation in Portland, Oregon, U.S.

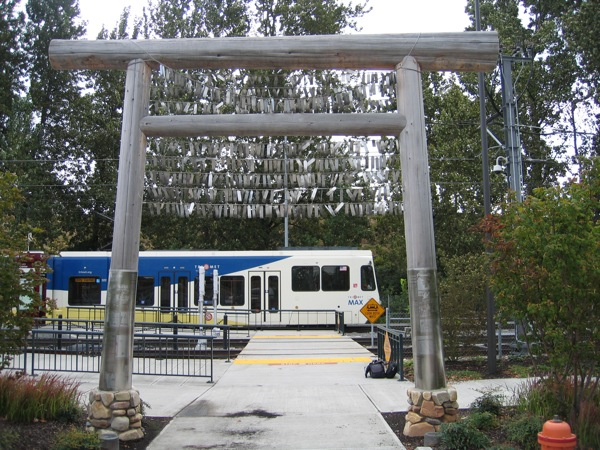
- The artwork in 2007
- Artist: Valerie Otani
- Year: 2004
- 45°36′18.68″N 122°41′9.45″W

Voices of Remembrance is an outdoor 2004 art installation by Valerie Otani, installed in north Portland, Oregon's Kenton neighborhood. The work is installed at TriMet's Expo Center station along the MAX Yellow Line, which was previously the site of the 1942 Portland Assembly Center.

== See also ==
- 2004 in art
