= St. Johns Signal Tower Gas Station =

Historic building in Portland, Oregon, U.S.

- U.S. National Register of Historic Places
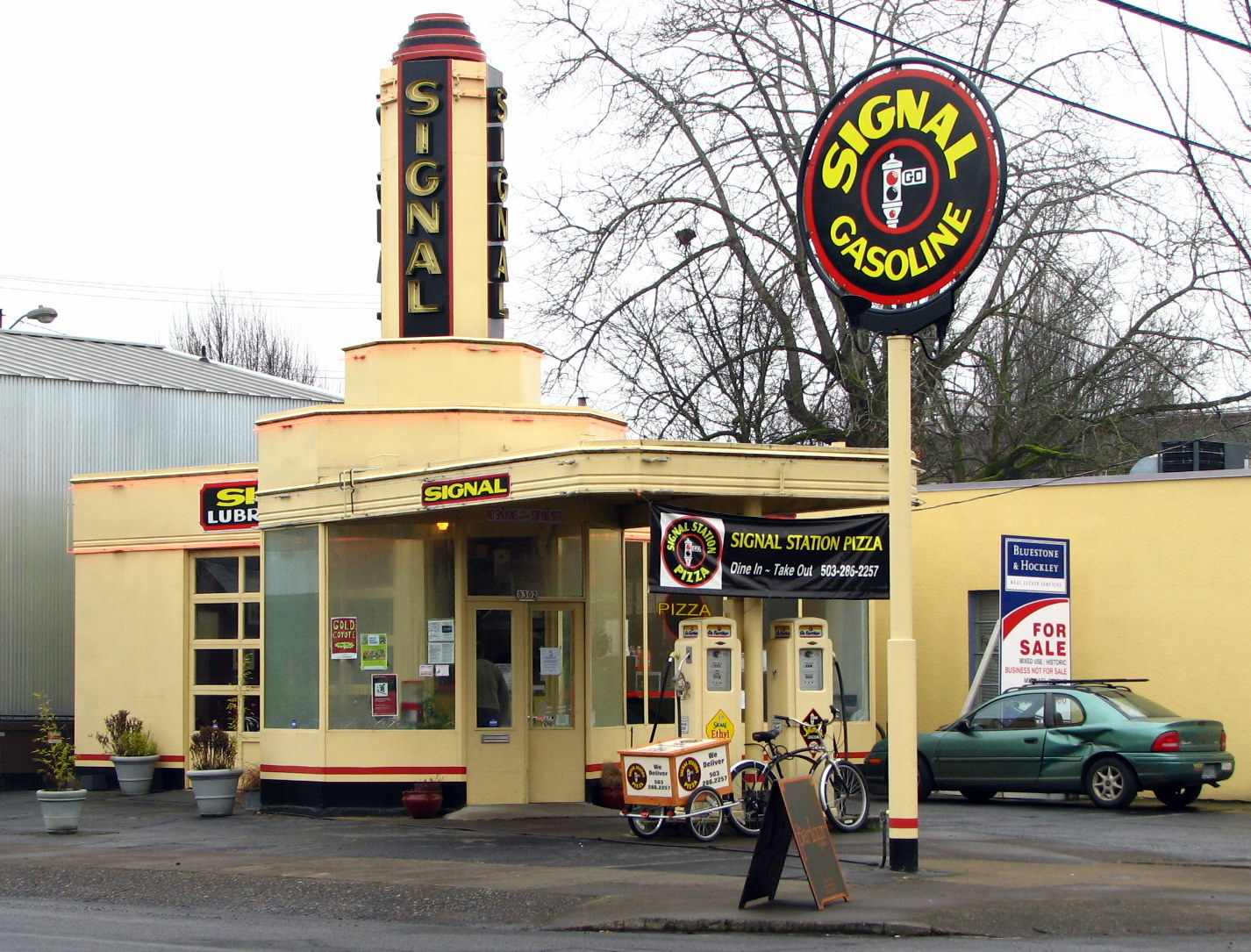
- St. Johns Signal Tower Gas Station in 2009

- Location within Portland, Oregon Location within Oregon Location within the United States
- Location: 8302 N. Lombard St. Portland, Oregon
- Coordinates: 45°35′21″N 122°45′08″W
- Area: 0.6 acres (0.24 ha)
- Built: 1939
- Architect: Ray F. Becker
- Architectural style: Moderne
- NRHP reference No.: 03001186
- Added to NRHP: November 21, 2003

The St. Johns Signal Tower Gas Station, located in the St. Johns neighborhood of north Portland, Oregon, is listed on the National Register of Historic Places. It was built and opened in 1939 as a gas station for the Signal Oil Company. It was in operation as a gas station until 1984, but changed brand from Signal Gas to Hellman's Golden Eagle Gas Station in 1954 and, in turn, became a Chevron station in 1965. In 1984, it was converted into a florist shop, the gasoline tanks being decommissioned at that time and filled with concrete, and it functioned in that capacity until 2002. The structure was added to the National Register in 2003.

In 2006, the building was converted into a restaurant, Signal Station Pizza, and it was still in use by the same business in 2024.

== See also ==
- National Register of Historic Places listings in North Portland, Oregon
