= Oregon Centennial Tokens =

Trade Token

Standard obverse of an Oregon Centennial Token

Oregon Centennial Tokens were a type of trade token (also known as a "So-Called Dollar") issued during the 1959 Oregon Centennial. Many localities sold them as a fundraiser to finance their Centennial celebrations.

== Design ==
The Northwest Specialty Sales Co. created several prototypes and induced 38 localities to purchase the tokens. Each locality had the option of using the standard obverse and a customizable standard reverse. The standard reverse also had room for two logos around the outer rim. Each locality determined the logos that were displayed on the reverse upper and lower curvatures. The standard obverse was the official emblem of the Oregon Centennial.

The standard reverse had a center with the phrase: "Good For 50¢ in trade At any cooperative Business or Redeemable At face value at the (locality) (location) until 3 P.M. Friday Sept. 1959." There existed variations of the standard reverse phrasing between localities but this one was the most common.

== Physical attributes ==
The tokens range in size from 32 to 40 millimeters in diameter. Different metal compositions were used by the manufacturer of the tokens. Each locality had the option of which type or types of metal composition to use in production. Some localities created limited versions using different metals than their standard versions. These different versions were used as awards, gifts, or special mementos for dignitaries.
