= N Lombard Transit Center =

Light rail station in Portland, Oregon, U.S.

N Lombard TC
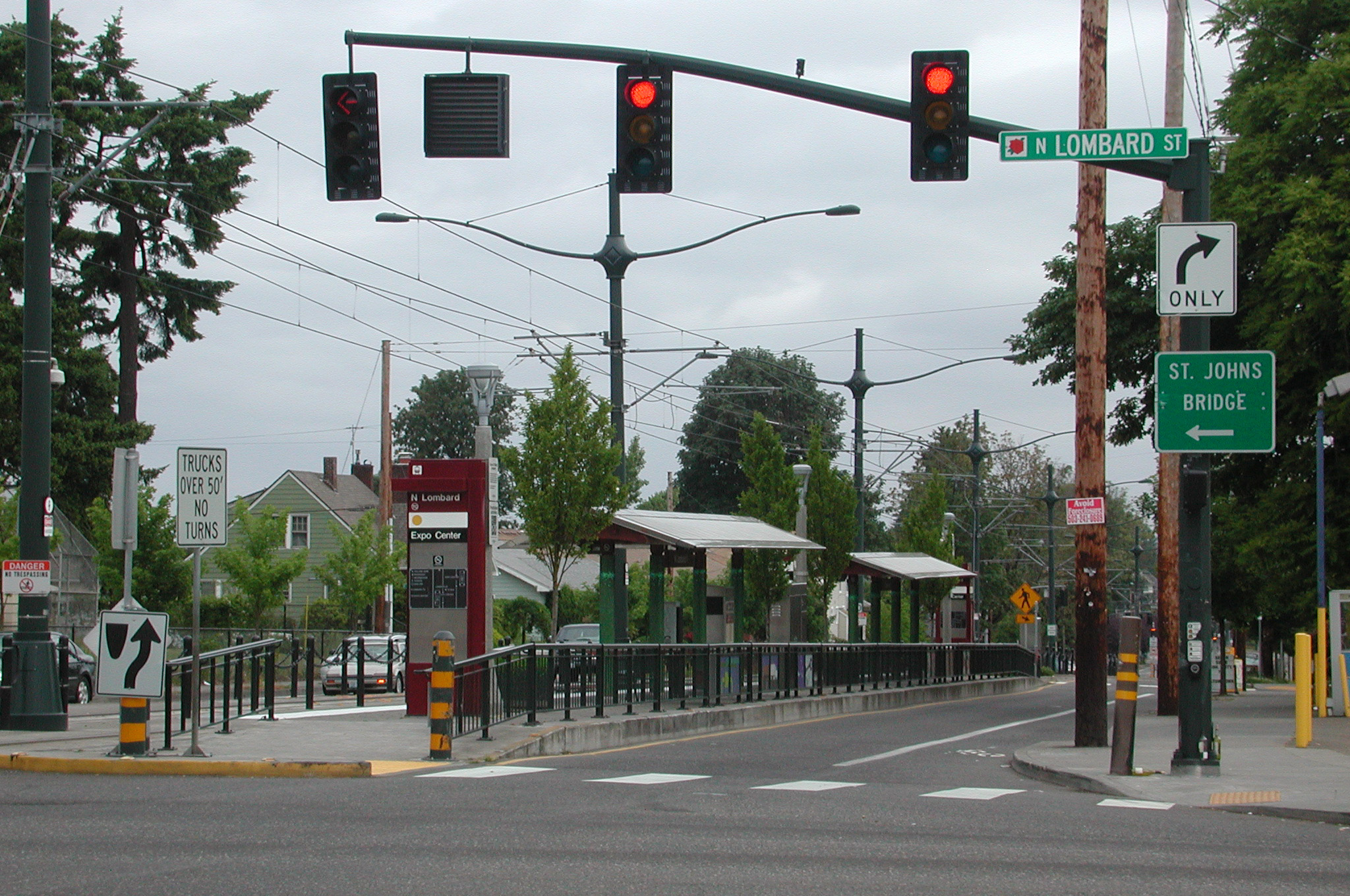
- View of the north platform from the south

General information
- Location: N Interstate Ave at Lombard St; Portland, Oregon; USA
- Coordinates: 45°34′38″N 122°40′56″W
- Owner: TriMet
- Platforms: split platform
- Tracks: 2

Construction
- Cycle facilities: Bike lockers
- Accessible: yes

History
- Opened: May 1, 2004

Services
| Preceding station | TriMet | Following station |
|---|---|---|
| Rosa Parks toward Union Station/NW 5th & Glisan | Yellow Line | Kenton/North Denver Avenue toward Expo Center |
Location

North Lombard Transit Center is a light rail station on the MAX Yellow Line in Portland, Oregon. It is the 7th stop northbound on the Interstate MAX extension.

The station is located in the median of Interstate Avenue near the intersection with N Lombard Street. It has staggered side platforms, which sit on either side of the cross street, because the route runs around this station on Interstate Avenue in the median. Mosaic tiles at the station and bus shelters refer to workers and transportation.

== Bus line connections ==
This station is served by the following bus lines:

- 4 - Fessenden/Woodstock
- 75 - Cesar Chavez/Lombard
- 293 - Yellow Bus

== See also ==
- List of TriMet transit centers
