= Portland Expo Center =

Convention center in Portland, Oregon, U.S.

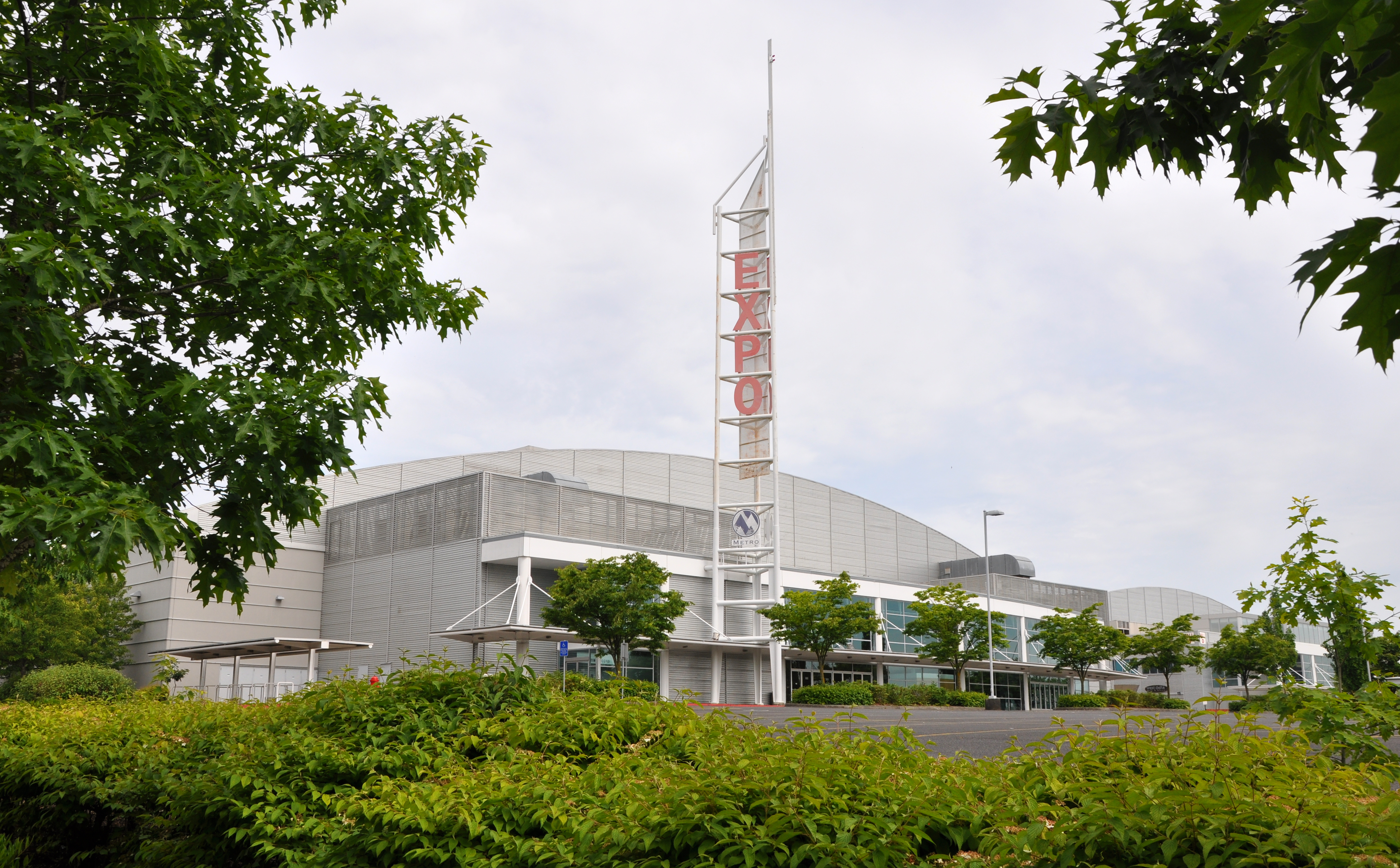
- Portland Expo Center in 2011
- Interactive map of Portland Expo Center
- Former names: Pacific International Livestock Exposition
- Address: 2025 N Expo Road; Portland, Oregon 97217
- Location: Portland, Oregon
- Coordinates: 45.6059°N 122.6894°W
- Owner: Metro
- Operator: Metropolitan Exposition and Recreation Commission
- Public transit: MAX Light Rail at Expo Center; Bus Service; 11

Construction
- Opened: 1920s

Website
- www.expocenter.org

The Portland Expo Center, officially the Portland Metropolitan Exposition Center, is a convention center located in the Kenton neighborhood of Portland, Oregon, United States. Opened in the early 1920s as a livestock exhibition and auction facility, the center now hosts over 100 events a year, including green consumer shows, trade shows, conventions, meetings and other special events. Located on the north side of Portland near Vancouver, Washington, it includes the northern terminus for the Yellow Line of Portland's light-rail transit system and has connections to TriMet Bus Line 11-Rivergate/Marine Dr.

== History ==
The complex was originally built in the early 1920s as the Pacific International Livestock Exposition, and operated as a livestock exhibition, cattle grading, and auction facility. Alexander Chalmers, Centerville/Forest Grove, breeder of Shorthorn cattle; Frank Brown, Carlton, breeder of Shropshire sheep and Shorthorn cattle; Herb Chandler, Baker, breeder of Hereford Cattle; A.C. Ruby, Portland, breeder of Clydesdale horses; O.M. Plumber, a Portland businessman; and W.B. Ayre, Portland, a wealthy lumberman as a group formed the Pacific International Livestock Show in Portland. The first year of the show (approx. 1920), the stock, including cattle, horses, sheep, and pigs, were housed in the beef cattle covered pens. Two huge exhibition tents were erected for the judging of the stock.

Later, a building was constructed adjacent to the North Portland stockyards, which was next to Swift & Co. slaughter and processing plant. Subsequent shows were held in this building, which still stood as of 1979. It is now owned by the Multnomah County Fair Association.

The show later had a side line of holding huge auctions of livestock for breeding purposes.

Later the show included horse show and rodeo venues.

From May 2 to September 10, 1942, the center suspended livestock exposition operations and served as a Civilian Assembly Center under President Roosevelt's Executive Order 9066, which authorized the eviction and confinement of Japanese Americans living on the West Coast during World War II. 3,676 people of Japanese descent were confined in the hastily converted animal corrals for a period of five months, while they awaited transfer to more permanent camps in California, Idaho and Wyoming. Voices of Remembrance, an installation piece by Portland artist Valerie Otani, acts as a memorial honoring the people held at the Portland Assembly Center in 1942.

For three months in the summer of 1959, the Oregon Centennial Exposition was held at the site. Among various attractions, the centennial exposition featured a railroad line that used two trains built for the then-new Portland Zoo Railway (now the Washington Park and Zoo Railway), on temporary loan.

Multnomah County acquired the facility in 1965; it was renamed the Multnomah County Exposition Center. It became home to the annual Multnomah County Fair in 1970, and the fairs were held there through 1996. After the Metropolitan Exposition and Recreation Commission of Metro, the regional government for the Portland metropolitan area, took over ownership and management of the facility in 1994, the complex was renamed Portland Expo Center. It has since undergone major renovations.

Events at the Expo Center include the Portland Better Living Home and Garden Show, Antique and Collectible Show, and Christmas Bazaar.

== Amenities ==
Halls A, B, and C are currently the oldest buildings in the complex. Halls A and B have 15-foot (5 m) ceiling heights, and Hall C has a 25-foot (8 m) ceiling height. Hall A has 48,000 square feet (4,500 m^{2}) of space and can accommodate up to 2,726; Hall B has 36,000 square feet (3,300 m^{2}) of space and can seat up to 2,700; Hall C has 60,000 square feet (6,000 m^{2}) of space, seats up to 4,736.

Hall D, the newest building in the complex (built in 2001), replaced an older exhibit hall. It has 72,000 square feet (6,700 m^{2}) of space and a 30-foot (9 m) ceiling height, can be divided into two exhibit halls and can seat up to 7,000. Hall E, built in 1997, is the largest exhibit hall in the complex, with 108,000 square feet (10,000 m^{2}) of space and a 30-foot (9 m) ceiling height. It seats up to 9,000. Halls D and E are connected by a 4,500-square-foot (420 m^{2}) connector. East Hall has 4,400-square-foot (410 m^{2}) of space. The complex has many meeting rooms and a total of 330,000 square feet (30,700 m^{2}) of exhibit space.

== See also ==
- Bibliography of the Japanese American Internment during World War II
- Outline of Japanese American Internment during World War II
