= Lombard Street (Portland, Oregon) =

Street in Portland, Oregon, US

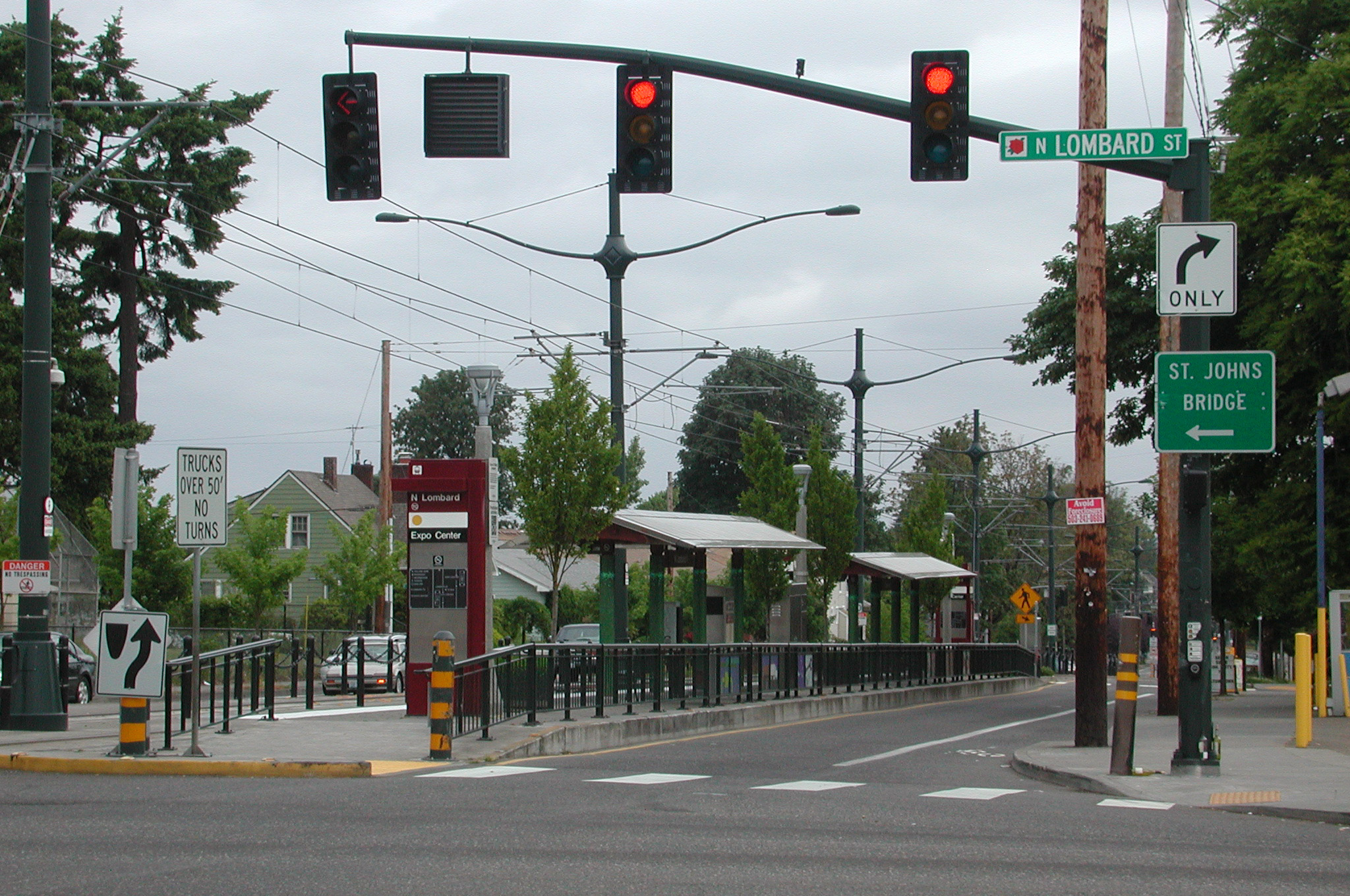
- Lombard St & Interstate Ave
- Former names: Dawson Street; Pippin Street; Burgard Road; Portland Highway; Killingsworth Street
- Part of: US 30 Byp.
- Maintained by: Portland Bureau of Transportation
- Length: 14.0 mi (22.5 km)
- Location: Portland, Oregon, U.S.
- West end: N Kelley Point Park Rd
- Major junctions: OR 99W; OR 99E; I-5; OR 213; I-205
- East end: Sandy Boulevard

Lombard Street is a main thoroughfare in Portland, Oregon, United States. It serves as a boundary and main commercial street for several north Portland neighborhoods.

== Route description ==
Lombard Street begins at Columbia Blvd. about 2.7 miles south of the confluence of the Columbia and Willamette Rivers. From here, it crosses the Columbia Slough and briefly runs southwest before turning south, serving as a primary industrial arterial. It then crosses above a railroad junction which serves that industrial area. It passes Pier Park before continuing into Downtown St. Johns as the main commercial street. At the end of that section, it crosses an intersection with Richmond Avenue, at which point it takes over the U.S. Route 30 Bypass (US 30 Byp.) designation. Lombard continues as a primarily commercial street through several neighborhoods (listed below).

Lombard turns slightly as it passes Columbia Park and continues east. It crosses Interstate Avenue (OR 99W). It then passes over Interstate 5 (I-5), providing access to the freeway via a half-cloverleaf interchange. Next, it crosses OR 99E (Martin Luther King, Jr. Boulevard), at which point it becomes a primarily industrial thoroughfare, employing interchanges for all but one of its four-way crossings. At its intersection with NE 10th Avenue, it turns southeast and continues until it passes over Interstate 205, at which point the street's designation as Lombard ends and it continues as NE Sandy Blvd.

=== Neighborhoods and districts served ===
- Rivergate Industrial District, from the Columbia Slough to Burgard Road.
- St Johns, including the Rivergate Industrial District, to the North Portland Railroad Cut.
- Portsmouth, from the North Portland Railroad Cut to N Chautauqua Boulevard, serving as the neighborhood's southern boundary.
- University Park, from the North Portland Railroad Cut to N Chautauqua Boulevard, serving as the neighborhood's northern boundary.
- Kenton, from N Chautauqua Boulevard to Interstate 5 (I-5), serving as the neighborhood's southern boundary.
- Arbor Lodge, from N Chautauqua Boulevard to Interstate 5 (I-5), serving as the neighborhood's northern boundary.
- Piedmont, from Interstate 5 (I-5) to NE Martin Luther King Jr. Boulevard.
- Woodlawn, from NE Martin Luther King Jr. Boulevard to NE 22nd Avenue.
- Concordia, from NE 22nd Avenue to NE 42nd Avenue.
- Cully, from NE 42nd Avenue to NE 82nd Avenue.
- Sumner, from NE 82nd Avenue to Interstate 205.
- Parkrose, from Interstate 205 to NE Sandy Blvd.

== Transportation ==
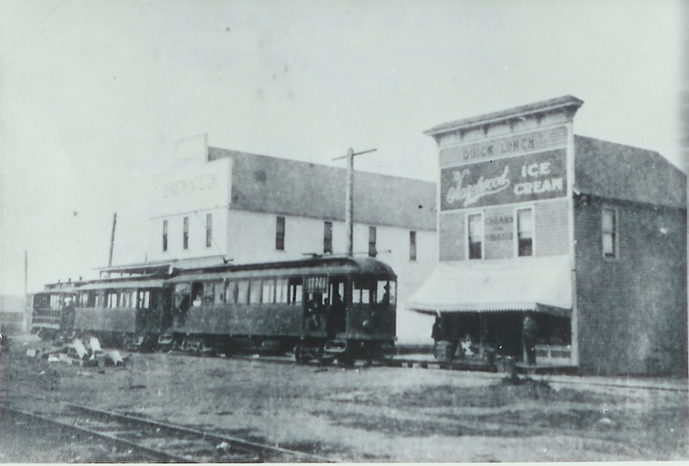
Electric trolley on Lombard, 1904

Several radial TriMet bus lines serve portions of Lombard Street.

- Line 4 runs between Downtown Portland and St. Johns with stops on two segments of Lombard: between N St. Louis and N Richmond Avenue, and between N Denver and N Albina Avenue. It provides a connection to the MAX Yellow Line at the North Lombard Transit Center.
- Line 11 runs between Cathedral Park and East Columbia, with stops on Lombard between N St. Louis and N Richmond Avenue.
- Line 35 runs between Oregon City and University of Portland, with stops on Lombard between N Portsmouth Avenue and N Greeley Avenue.
- Line 44 runs between Portland Community College's Sylvania campus and Pier Park, with stops on Lombard between the park and N Richmond Avenue.
- Line 75 runs between Milwaukie and St. Johns, with stops on Lombard from Pier Park to N Williams Avenue. It also provides a MAX connection at the North Lombard Transit Center.

== History ==
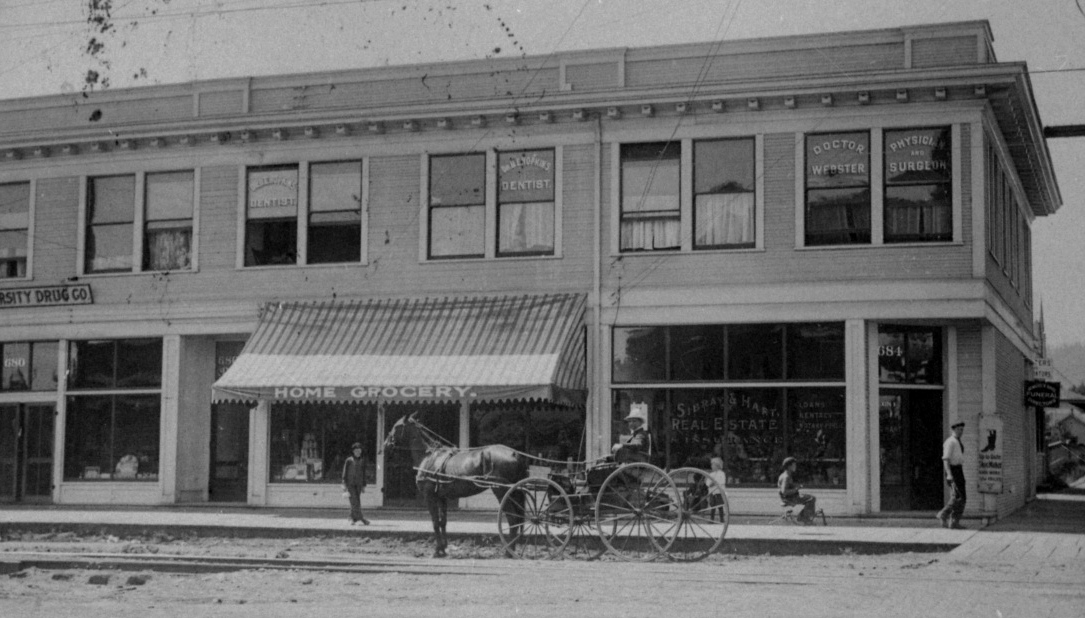
Building at 4786 N Lombard, 1909

Lombard Street holds several different historical names because of North Portland's history as a series of smaller communities that were annexed by Portland. In Kenton and Albina, it was named Pippin Street. In Portsmouth, it was named Dawson Street. As the main street of St. Johns' commercial core, it was named Jersey Street.

Historically, Lombard Street was home to a large segment of the "St. Johns" streetcar line, which ran from Albina to St. Johns between 1889 and 1937. The Kenton Stockyard line also traveled up a portion of Lombard between 1909 and 1928.

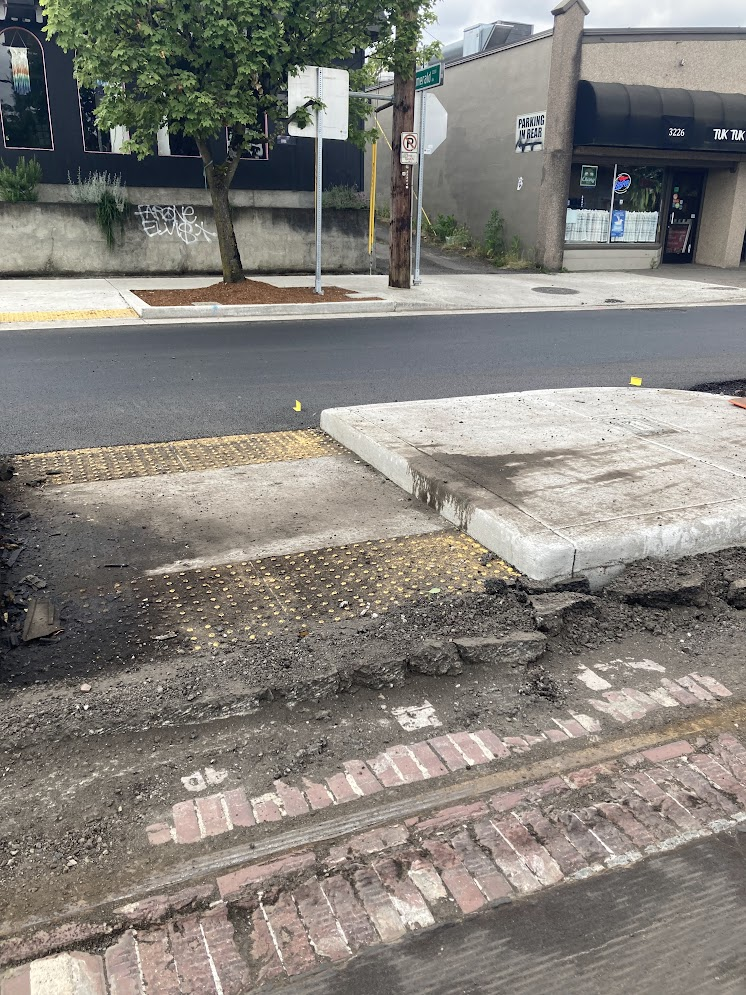
Streetcar rails under existing pavement on N Lombard Street at N Emerald Avenue. ODOT temporarily removed the pavement as part of the Lombard Multimodal Safety Project in the summer of 2022 which revealed the underlying rails.

Rail still exists under the asphalt in some parts of the street, including some slated for removal by the Portland Bureau of Transportation in plans for the N Lombard Main Street renewal project. In July 2020, the Portland City Council passed an ordinance to rename a section of Northeast Killingsworth Street to Northeast Lombard Street, which would be extended to provide a consistent name across the northeast of the city. The new terminus of Lombard Street is at Sandy Boulevard near Interstate 205.

== Events ==
The St. Johns Parade has been held annually for over 50 years, and uses Lombard between N Burr Avenue and Downtown St. Johns as the main part of its route.

== Notable landmarks ==
- Kelley Point Park
- Pier Park
- St. Johns Twin Cinema, built 1913
- James John Elementary School, built 1929
- St. Johns Signal Tower Gas Station, built 1939
- John Yeon Speculative House, built 1939
- Columbia Park
- De La Salle North Catholic High School
