= Portsmouth, Portland, Oregon =

Portsmouth
- Neighborhood
- Location in Portland
- Coordinates: 45°35′12″N 122°43′06″W
- Country: United States
- State: Oregon
- City: Portland

Government
  - Association: Portsmouth Neighborhood Association
  - Coalition: Northeast Coalition of Neighborhoods

Area
  - Total: 1.09 sq mi (2.82 km^{2})

Population (2010)
  - Total: 9,789
  - Density: 8,990/sq mi (3,470/km^{2})

Housing
  - No. of households: 3,627
  - Occupancy rate: 95% occupied
  - Owner-occupied: 1,695 households (47%)
  - Renting: 1,754 households (48%)
  - Avg. household size: 2.70 persons

Portsmouth is a neighborhood in the north section of Portland, Oregon, United States. It is bordered by Columbia Boulevard to the north, Lombard Street to the south, Chautauqua Boulevard to the east, and a BNSF Railway cut to the west.

== History ==
In 1883, a group of realtors operating as the "Portsmouth Real Estate Association" platted a subdivision around present-day Portsmouth Avenue and Lombard Street. This association referred to the subdivision as the "City of Portsmouth", although a proper municipality was never established. This land was later acquired by the Electric Land Company, which platted "Portsmouth Villa" in 1889. Portland Names and Neighborhoods notes: "We are not sure what 'Portsmouth' meant to those developers in 1883. The location is near the lower end of the Portland harbor, and perhaps they felt the word was therefore suitable."

== Features ==
Portsmouth is a primarily residential neighborhood. A large portion of the neighborhood is occupied by New Columbia, an 82-acre (33 ha) mixed-income housing development.

Parks in Portsmouth include Columbia Park, McCoy Park, Northgate Park, and University Park. The Peninsula Crossing Trail runs along the neighborhood's western boundary. Three public schools are located within Portsmouth: César Chávez School (K–8), Rosa Parks Elementary School (K–5), and Clarendon Early Learning Academy (pre-K). The neighborhood is home to the Charles Jordan Community Center.
