= University Park, Portland, Oregon =

University Park
- Neighborhood
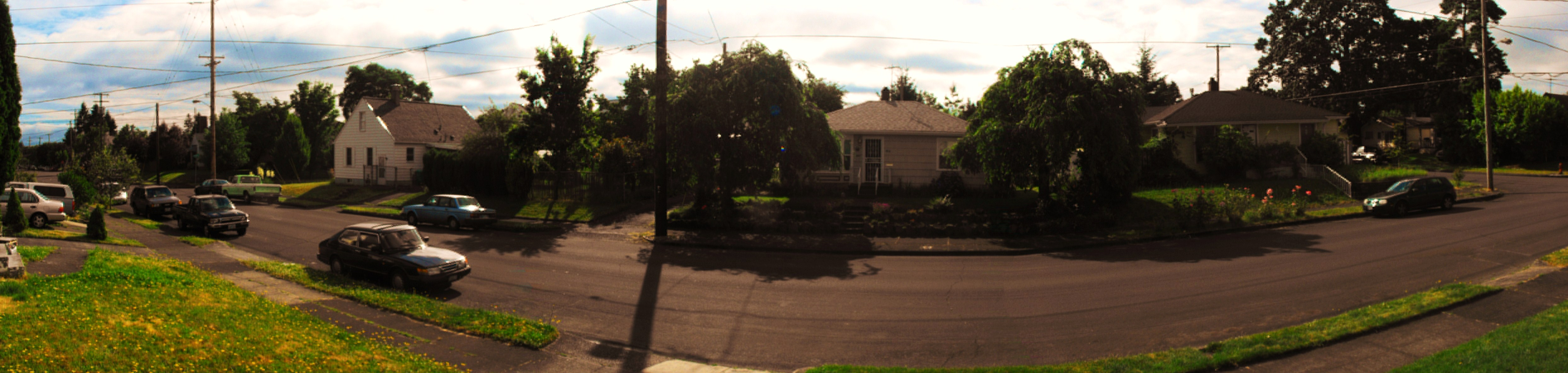
- Location in Portland
- Coordinates: 45°34′44″N 122°44′13″W
- Country: United States
- State: Oregon
- City: Portland

Government
  - Association: University Park Neighborhood Association
  - Coalition: Northeast Coalition of Neighborhoods

Area
  - Total: 1.20 sq mi (3.10 km^{2})

Population (2000)
  - Total: 5,250
  - Density: 4,390/sq mi (1,690/km^{2})

Housing
  - No. of households: 1692
  - Occupancy rate: 95% occupied
  - Owner-occupied: 1238 households (73%)
  - Renting: 454 households (27%)
  - Avg. household size: 3.10 persons

University Park is a neighborhood in the north section of Portland, Oregon, United States, on the east shore of the Willamette River. University Park is bounded by North Lombard Street and the Portsmouth neighborhood to the north, North Chautauqua Boulevard and the Arbor Lodge neighborhood to the east, The Willamette River and Mock's Bottom industrial area to the south, and the North Portland railroad cut with Cathedral Park and St. Johns neighborhoods to the west.

The neighborhood shares its name with a 11.26-acre (4.56 ha) North Portland park in the adjacent Portsmouth neighborhood, land for which was acquired in 1953.

University Park is home to Portland's largest mixed-race population, making up 7.49% of its population.

== History ==
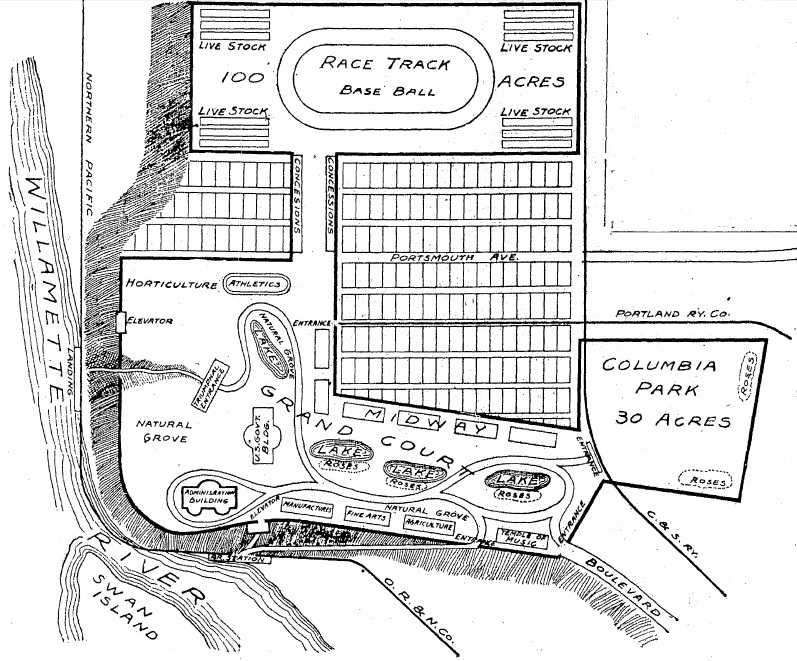
A 1902 proposed site plan, on land that later became the University Park neighborhood, for the Lewis and Clark Centennial Exposition. The exposition was instead held on an artificial island in Guild's Lake.

University Park was named for its proximity to the former Portland University, a Methodist institution founded in 1891. Property of 71 acres for the university and roughly 530 acres for the surrounding neighborhood was platted from land owned by pioneer families and sold at half-value to the Methodist Episcopal Church, then owners of Willamette University in Salem. The church planned to sell individual lots through a realty company in University Park to finance the university, but home site sales did not sustain the institution. A financial failure for most of its brief existence, the university closed in 1900.

After Portland University closed, the land and buildings were purchased by the Archdiocese of Portland in 1901, and Columbia University opened on the site, later renamed the University of Portland. Public transportation was installed, and industry began to develop in the area.

As designers of University Park, Methodist Episcopal officials aligned streets along a northeast – southwest axis and a northwest – southeast axis in order to maximize exposure to sunlight. Church officials also chose street names in remembrance not only of institutions of higher learning but also persons and places important to Methodists of the time. As a result, University Park is a neighborhood without an ordinal relationship among streets; therefore, navigation requires knowledge of all streets.

== Features ==
- Chiles Center
- Columbia Park Annex
- Joe Etzel Field
- Louisiana-Pacific Tennis Center
- McKenna Park
- Merlo Field
- Portsmouth Park
