= Statue of Paul Bunyan (Portland, Oregon) =

Statue of Paul Bunyan in Portland, Oregon

- Paul Bunyan Statue
- U.S. National Register of Historic Places
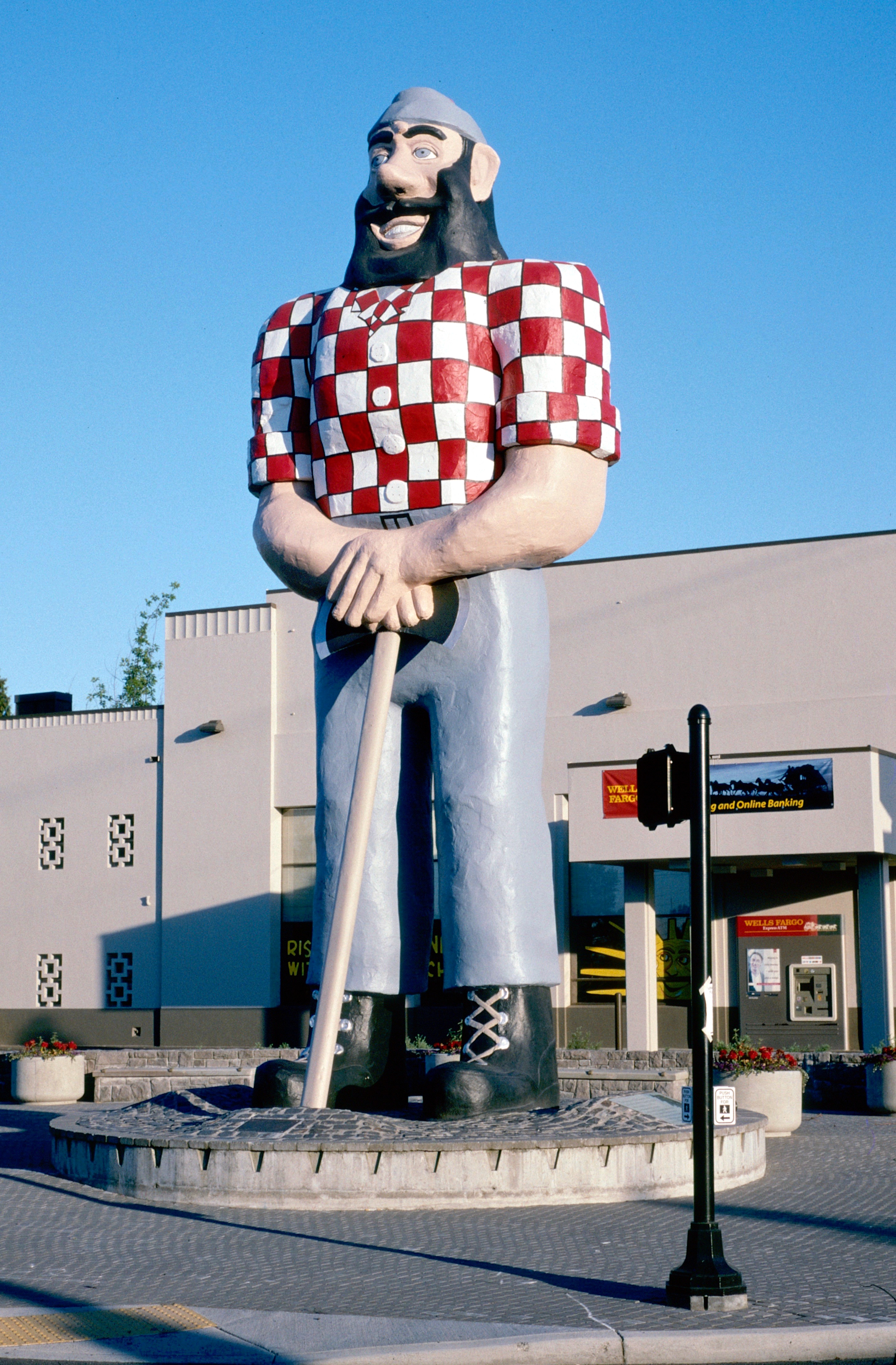
- The statue in 2004

- Location within Portland, Oregon
- Location: SW corner of N Denver Ave. and N Interstate Ave., Portland, Oregon
- Coordinates: 45.583817°N 122.686598°W
- Area: Less than 1 acre
- Built: 1959
- Architectural style: Novelty architecture
- NRHP reference No.: 08001393
- Added to NRHP: January 28, 2009

Paul Bunyan Statue is a 31-foot-tall (9.4 m) concrete and metal sculpture of mythical logger Paul Bunyan in the Kenton neighborhood of Portland, Oregon, United States. It was built in 1959 to commemorate the centennial of Oregon's statehood during the Centennial Exposition and International Trade Fair, which was held in the Kenton area.

== History ==
The sculpture was originally prominently placed at the intersection of North Interstate Avenue (then U.S. Route 99) and North Argyle Street, and now stands at the corner of North Interstate and North Denver, 59 feet south of its original location. It was listed on the National Register of Historic Places in January 2009.

The statue was the Highlighted Property of the Week when the National Park Service released its weekly list of February 6, 2009.

== See also ==
- 1959 in art
- National Register of Historic Places listings in North Portland, Oregon
- Statues of Paul Bunyan
