= N Killingsworth St station =

Light rail station in Portland, Oregon, U.S.

N Killingsworth Street
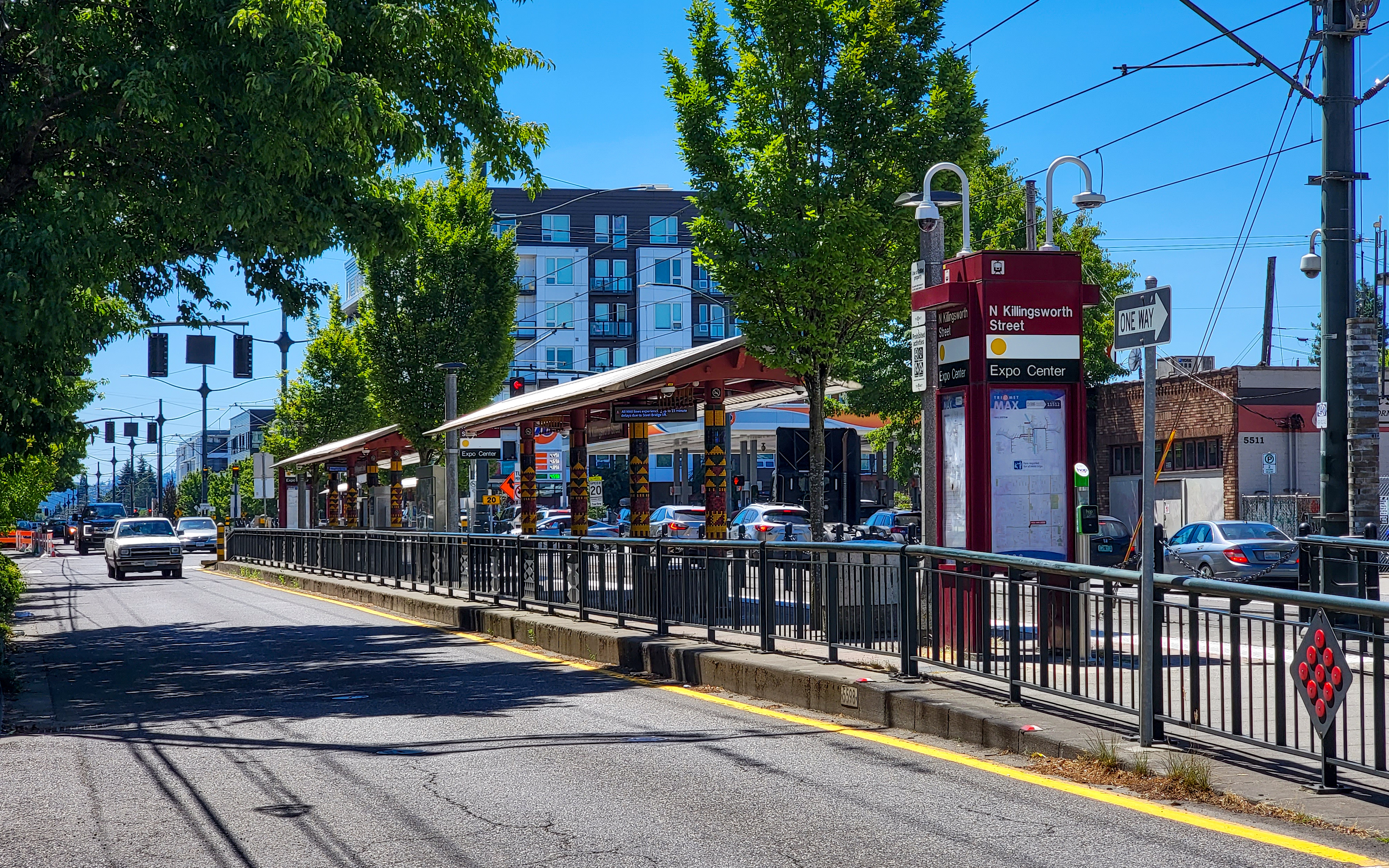
- Northbound platform, facing south

General information
- Location: 5598 (north)/5499 (south) North Interstate Avenue; Portland, Oregon; United States
- Coordinates: 45°33′46″N 122°40′56″W
- Owner: TriMet
- Platforms: split platform
- Tracks: 2

Construction
- Parking: No Parking
- Cycle facilities: Bike lockers
- Accessible: yes

Other information
- Fare zone: none

History
- Opened: May 1, 2004

Services
Preceding station	TriMet	Following station
North Prescott Street toward Union Station/NW 5th & Glisan	Yellow Line	Rosa Parks toward Expo Center
Location

North Killingsworth Street is a light rail station on the MAX Yellow Line in Portland, Oregon. It is the fifth stop northbound on the Interstate MAX extension.

The station is located in the median of Interstate Avenue near the intersection of N. Killingsworth Street. This station has staggered side platforms which sit on either side of the cross street, because the route runs around this station on Interstate Avenue in the median. Artistic elements at the station are inspired by African art.

== Bus line connections ==
This station is served by the following bus lines:

- 72 - Killingsworth/82nd Ave
- 293 - Yellow Bus
