= Wright Brothers Park (Montgomery, Alabama) =

Park in Montgomery, Alabama, United States

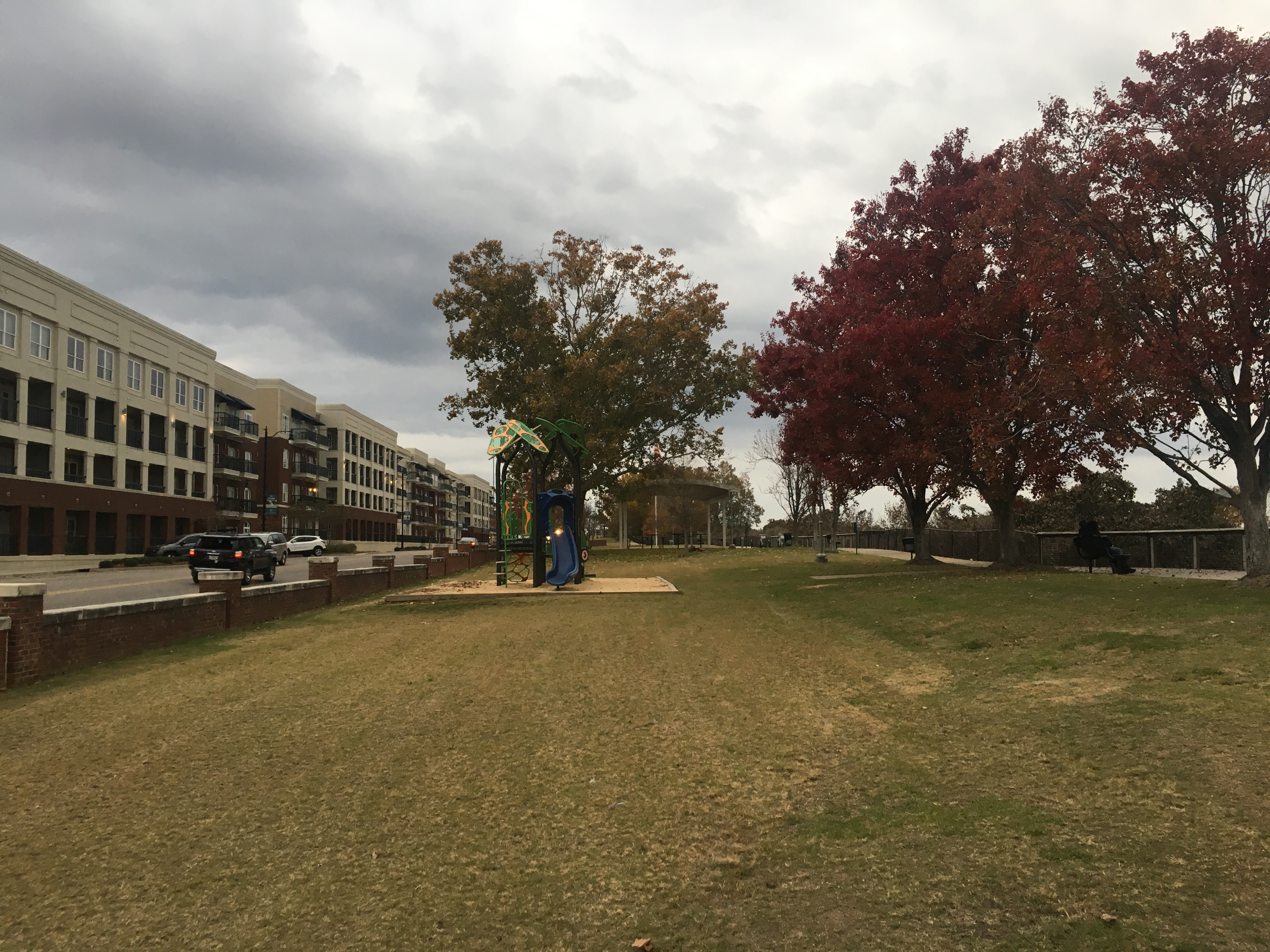
- Wright Brothers Park, November 2019

- Location within Alabama
- Location: Montgomery, Montgomery County, Alabama, United States
- Coordinates: 32°22′40″N 86°19′05″W
- Open: Sunrise to sunset

Wright Brothers Park is an urban park in Montgomery, Alabama, United States.

The park was renamed from Overlook Park to Wright Brothers Park on July 2, 2013, in dedication to the Wright Brothers. The park underwent renovations and redecoration for the dedication. One of the objects of redecoration is a full-scale replica of the Wright Flyer which is above the Alabama River.

Wright Brothers Park features views of the Alabama River and the surrounding area. Picnic shelters with off-street parking provide a space for family picnics. Amenities include benches, trails with views of the river, and a playground. The park has four picnic tables under a gazebo overlooking the Alabama River (Maxwell Boulevard).

== Amenities ==
The park overlooks the Alabama River, providing picnic shelters and tables, and off-street parking.

== Location ==
=== Address ===
544 Maxwell Blvd, Montgomery, AL 36104
