= Overlook Park (Portland, Oregon) =

Public park in Portland, Oregon, U.S.

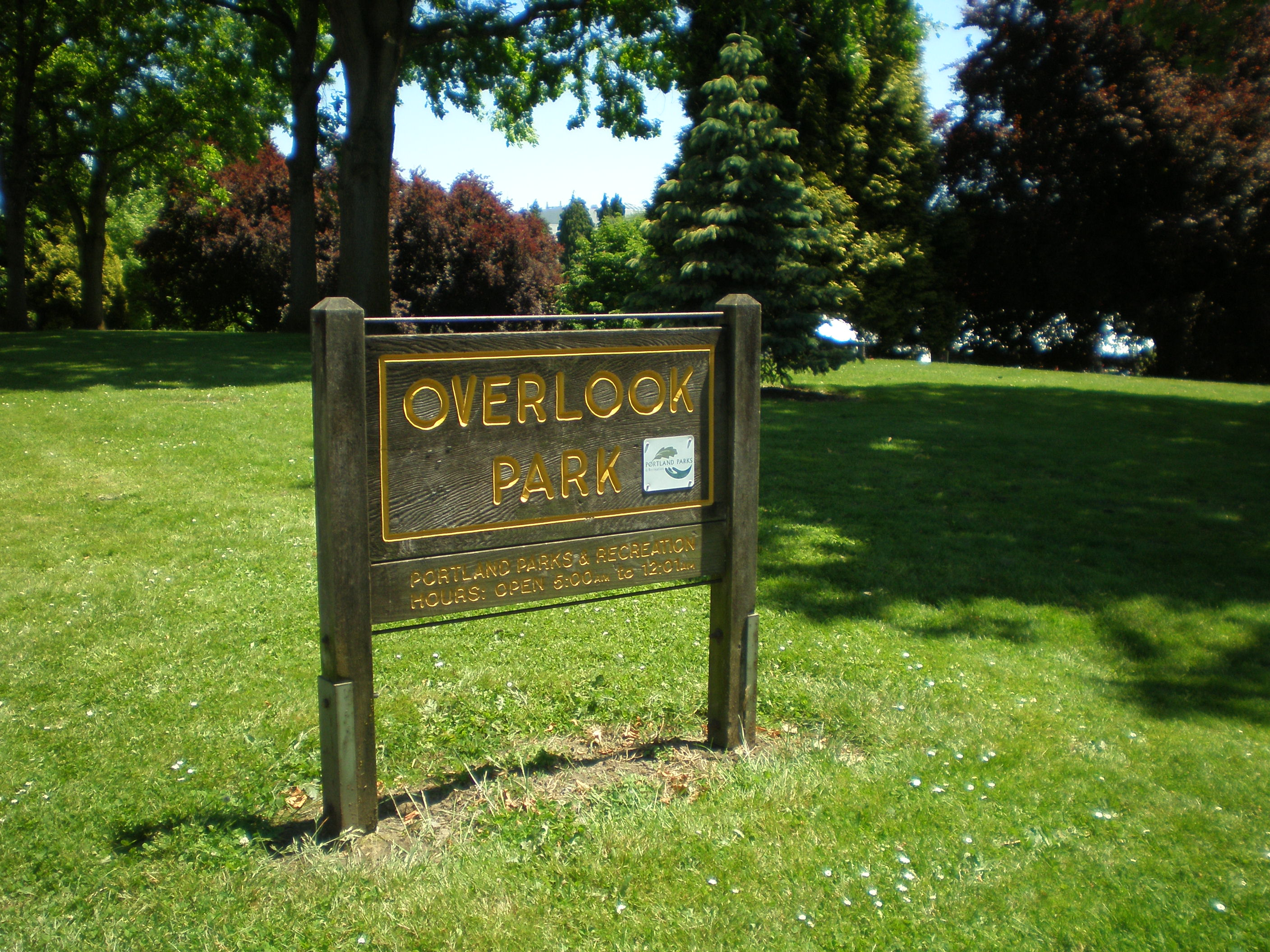
- Signage for the park in 2011

- Location within Portland, Oregon
- Location: N Fremont St. and Interstate Ave. Portland, Oregon
- Coordinates: 45°32′55″N 122°40′58″W
- Area: 11.30 acres (4.57 ha)
- Operator: Portland Parks & Recreation
- Public transit: Overlook Park

Overlook Park is a public park in north Portland, Oregon, United States.

The park is known for its picturesque views of downtown Portland. It features a variety of amenities, including sports fields, a playground, and walking paths. Located at the intersection of North Fremont Street and Interstate Avenue, the 10.93-acre (4.42 ha) park was acquired in 1930. It is accessible via the Overlook Park MAX station.

The park is home to a shelter and comfort station, constructed in the 1930s as part of a New Deal-era Works Progress Administration project. The shelter is considered a key historical feature of the park, providing a venue for small events and gatherings.

The park features extensive walking paths with scenic views of the Willamette River and downtown Portland. It also contains a playground, and sports fields which are used for soccer and other team sports.

The surrounding Overlook neighborhood also hosts several popular local businesses, and the Historic Overlook House.

== See also ==
- List of parks in Portland, Oregon
