= Columbia Park (Seattle) =

Public park in Seattle, Washington, U.S.

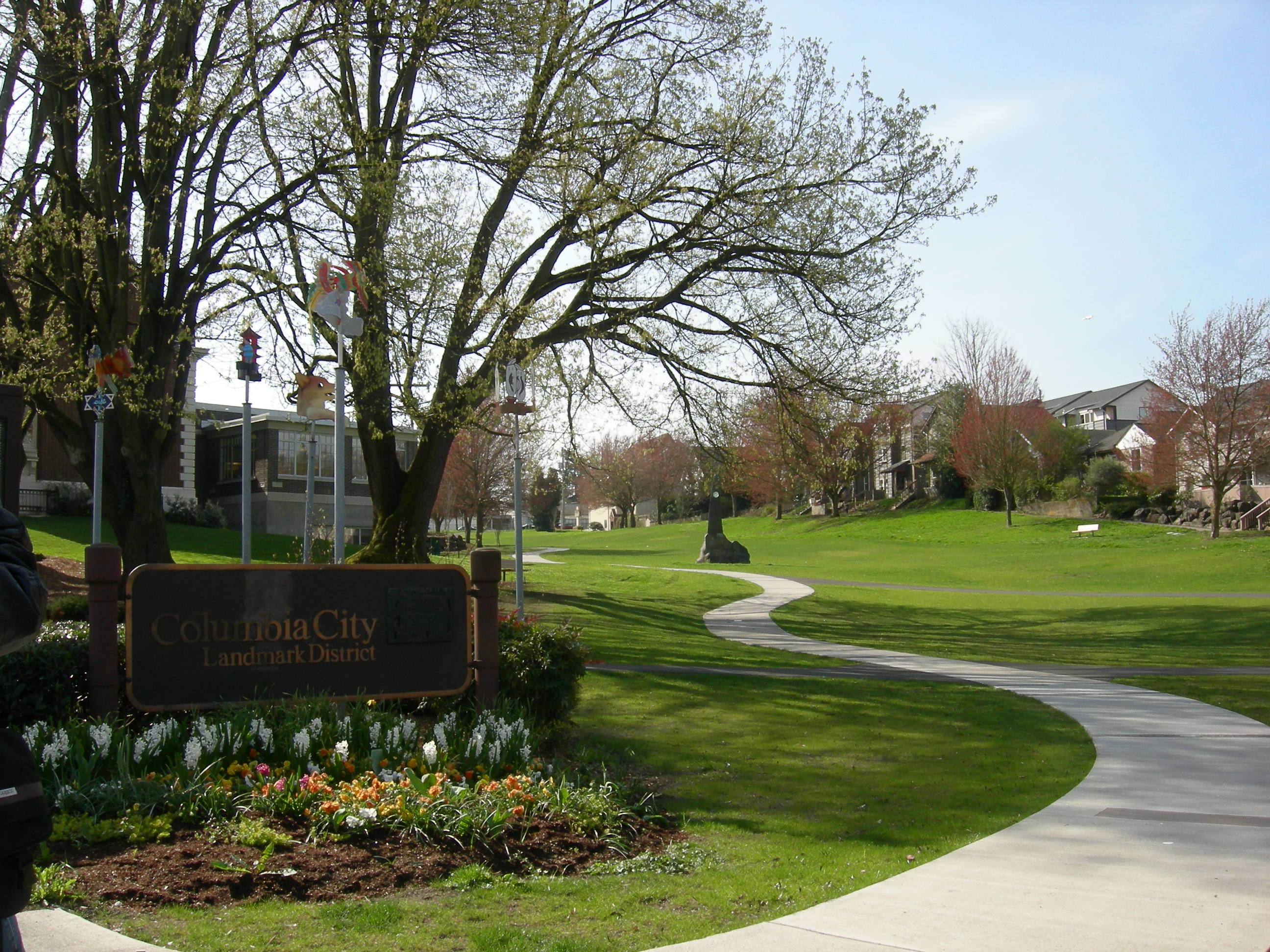
- The park in 2007
- Interactive map of Columbia Park
- Type: Urban park
- Location: Seattle, Washington, U.S.
- Coordinates: 47°33′36″N 122°17′14″W
- Area: 2.02 acres (0.82 ha; 0.00316 sq mi)
- Designer: Olmsted Brothers

Columbia Park is a public park in the Columbia City neighborhood of Seattle, in the U.S. state of Washington. Annexed to the city in 1907, the park is adjacent to the Columbia Branch of the Seattle Public Library.

== History ==
Columbia Park was first designated in September 1891 on a plat filed by Frank and Kate Black.

The original park plat was larger than the present-day park. It included land to the north and to the east which today is Rainier Playfield. The original plat was traversed by potential future streets. However, in 1911, all the property owners affected by those potential streets relinquished their claims, allowing for the creation of the park. The waivers, filed and recorded in 1912, helped win a court dispute in the 1960s and 1970s that preserved the park from development.

After Columbia City's annexation to Seattle in 1907, urban development changed the park's landscape, including diverting the stream into sewers and filling in the park's ravine during the 1920s.

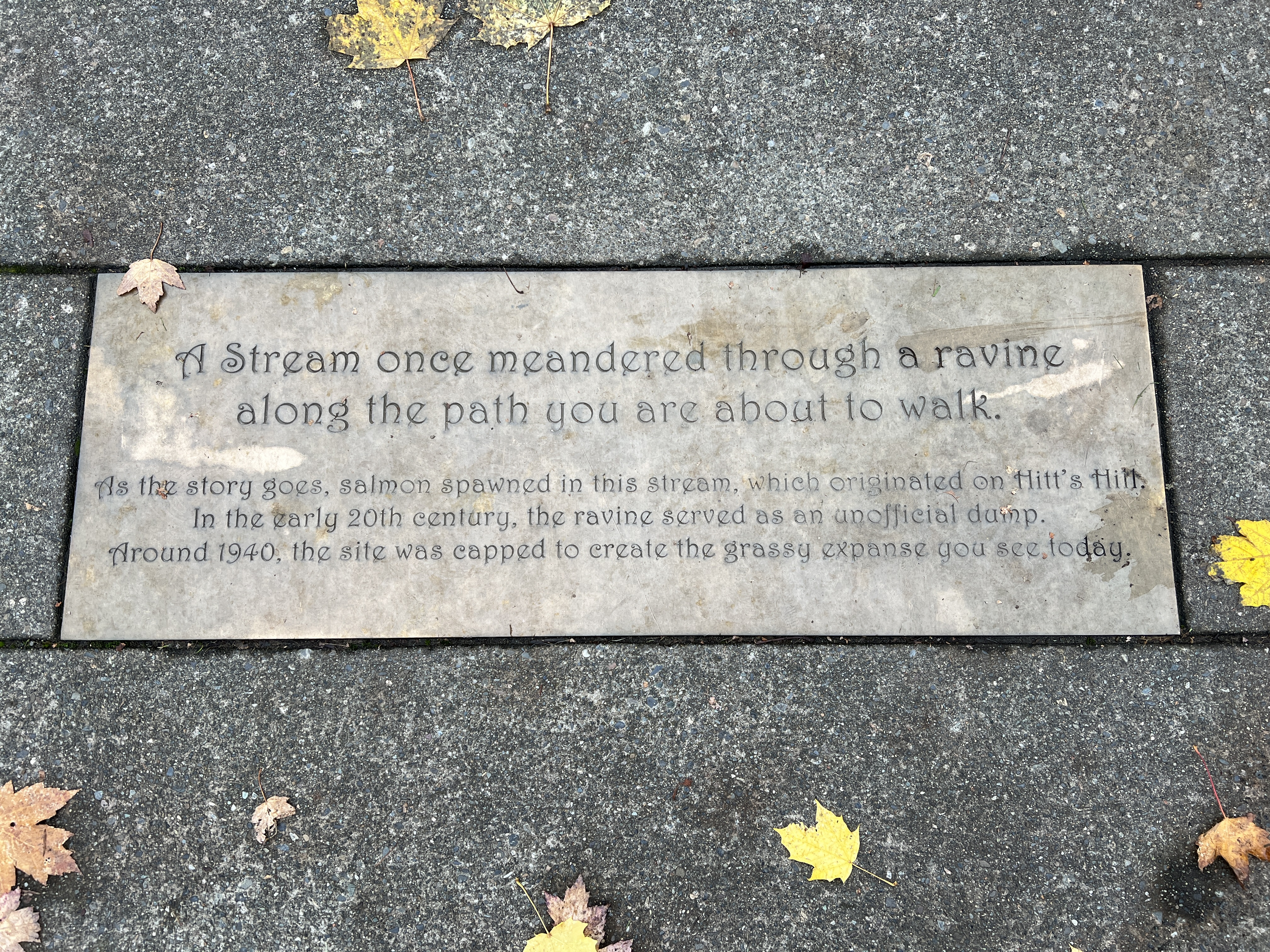
A plaque briefly describes Columbia Park's history: first as a ravine with a salmon-spawning stream, then as a dump, and finally as a park.

In 1912, Frank and Kate Black donated part of the park's land for the construction of the Columbia Branch of the Seattle Public Library System.

Additional improvements on the park were made during a Works Progress Administration (WPA) project in 1939, which included the installation of a sprinkler system. Despite legal challenges to develop the park for commercial use in the 1960s and 1970s, community efforts preserved it, maintaining Columbia Park as a recreational space.

== Activities ==
=== Farmers Market ===
Columbia Park has been the backdrop for the Columbia City Farmers Market since 1998. Market visitors will sometimes picnic in the park.

=== SEEDArt Summer Series ===
Since 2012, SEEDArts has coordinated a series of free family-friendly events in Columbia Park, including concerts, theater performances, and movie showings.

=== Honk! Fest West ===
Columbia Park is a venue for Honk! Fest West, an annual festival that celebrates street music from around the world.
