= Columbia Park (Portland, Oregon) =

Public park in Portland, Oregon, U.S.

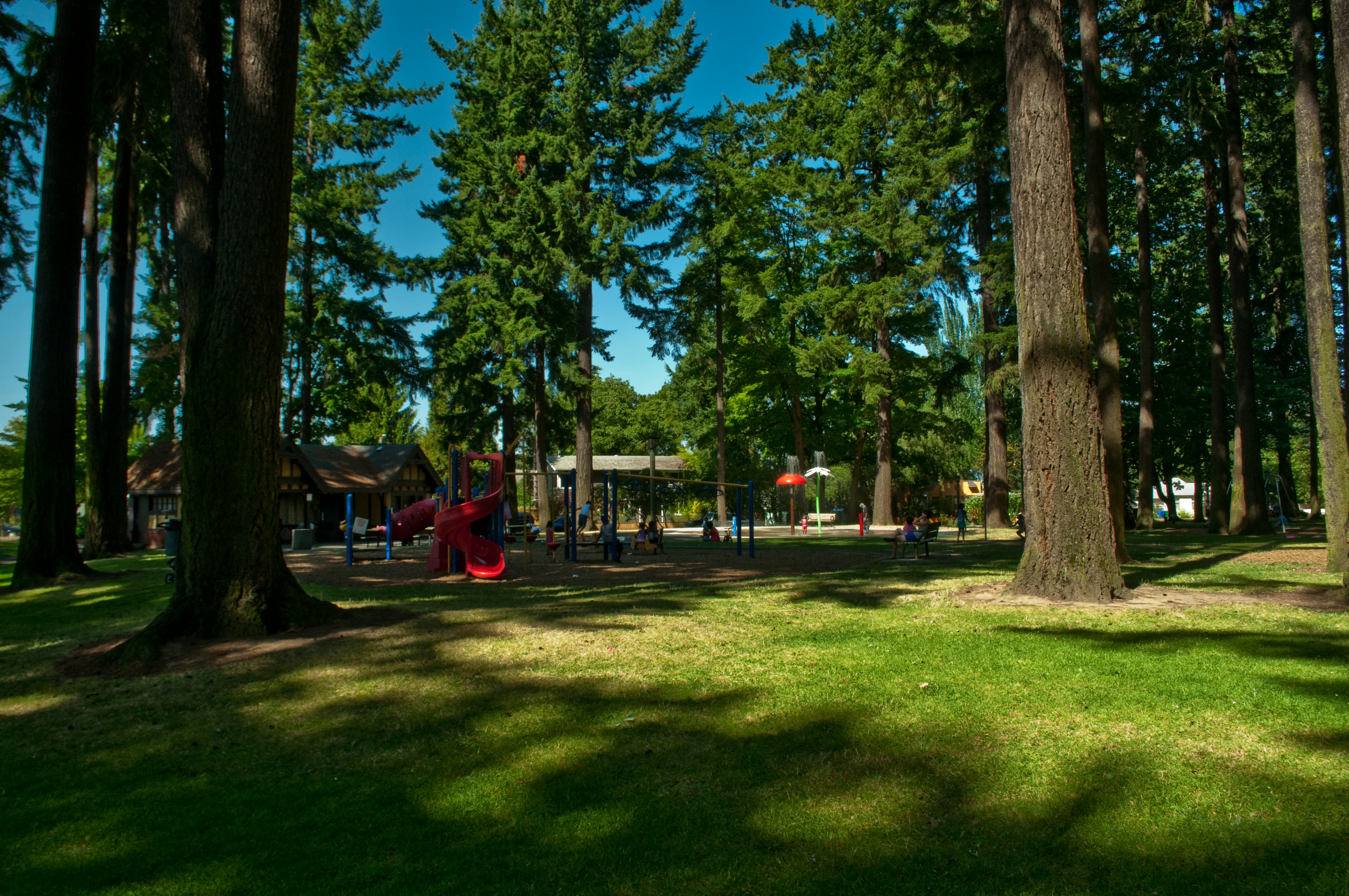
- The playground at the park, 2012
- Interactive map of Columbia Park
- Location: North Lombard Street and Woolsey Avenue
- Nearest city: Portland, Oregon, U.S.
- Coordinates: 45.5795°N 122.7117°W
- Area: 35.37 acres (14.31 ha)
- Created: 1891
- Operator: Portland Parks & Recreation

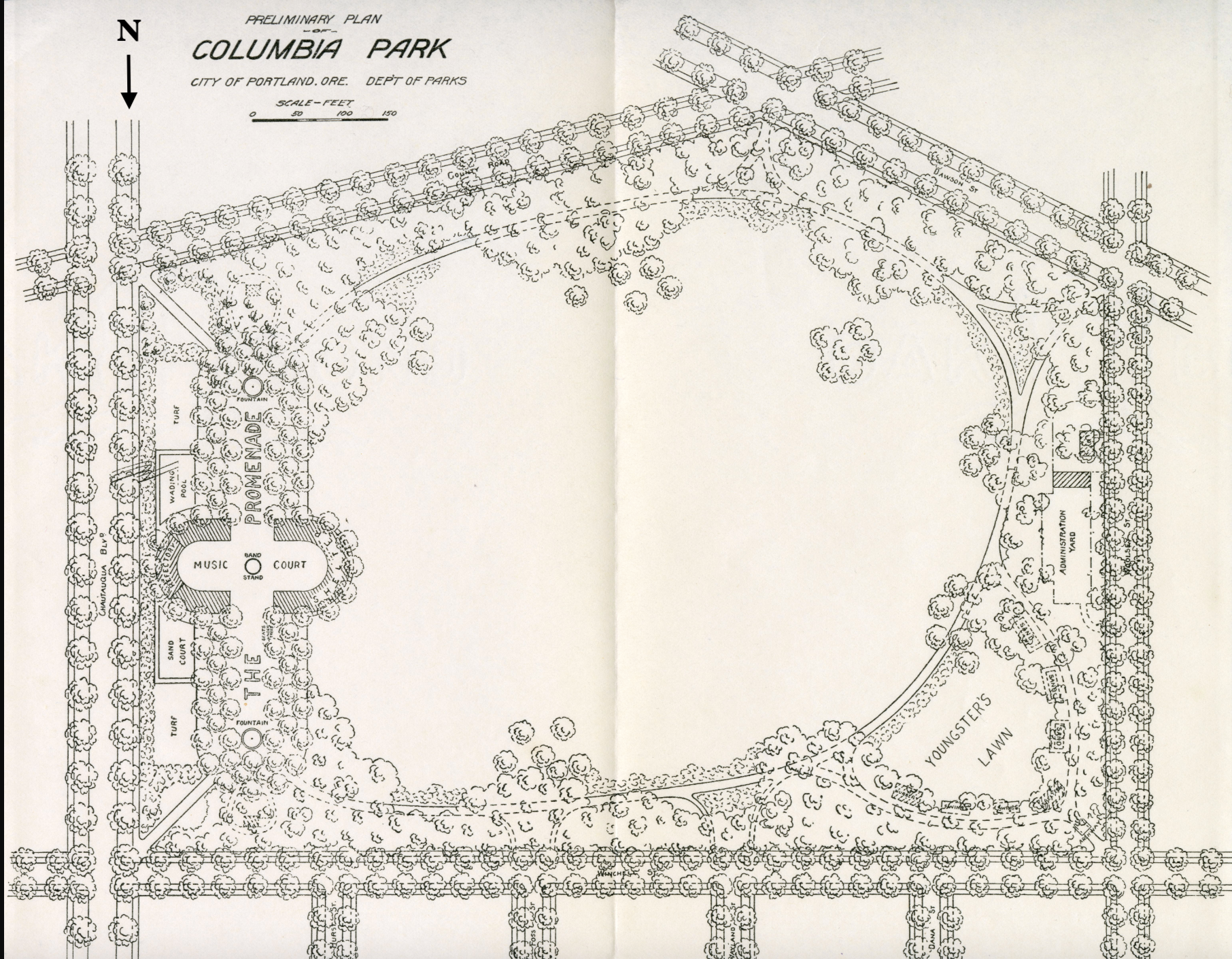
Park plan created by E.T. Mische in 1914.

Columbia Park is a park located in north Portland, Oregon, United States.

== History ==
Soon after Portland and Albina consolidated in 1891, the park became the first in Portland's Northwest quadrant. It was a wooded tract with an open space toward its eastern end. Additional trees were planted in the open space, which made it difficult to plan for sports fields. When John Charles Olmsted visited the park in 1903, he recommended that the new trees be removed and the meadow be significantly enlarged. He promoted pushing the trees back to the borders, stating:

“To do this intelligently, it will be necessary to have some plan. There will have to be walks eventually, and some of these must necessarily be arranged as shortcut paths. No doubt it will be advisable to open up a separate lawn for little children, so that they will not be inconvenienced or endangered by the rougher play that is to go on in the main ball field. Some form of shelter will doubtless be desirable, if not necessary eventually, and its location should be considered in planning the grounds. Some central feature, such as a fountain basin, may also be needed to create interest, considering the flatness of the ground .... In general, the main idea to be accomplished in the thinning is to arrange.: for a continuous border, so that surrounding houses will not be unduly conspicuous, and for the longest practicable views in various directions within the grounds over narrow winding lawns, or low masses of shrubbery.”

When Emanuel T. Mische crafted his 1914 plan, he drew up the Olmsted vision. Mische applied the organizing factor of a large open meadow surrounded by an oval path system passing in and out of the perimeter trees and plantings. At the eastern head of the meadow, he planned a music court located along a north-south promenade that would have fountains at each end. Behind the promenade were turf, sand areas, and a pool. West of the meadow, near North Woolsey Avenue, he placed what he called a youngster's lawn and an administration yard.

Within the wooded area is a building that Ellis Lawrence designed, mainly to house the restrooms and to provide an open picnic pavilion. These handsome structures are dotted throughout the parks that Mische designed and are noted for their Shakespearean presence. They might be called Tudor style because of their half timbering and wide barge boards with support brackets combined with brick. At the time, they were in keeping with the park philosophy that these buildings should not dominate a park- they should appear in good taste and style but not intrude. As over two dozen of these structures exist in early Portland parks (Alberta, Columbia, Creston, Grant, Irving, Laurelhurst, Peninsula, Lents, Mount Scott, Pier, Sellwood, Rose City, Washington, and Wallace), they are of special value and deserve every effort to keep and restore them to practical use. Today, with serious budget cuts leading to a lack of maintenance, most are in danger of demolition. Today the original plan of walkways in Columbia Park still exists, though the meadow is much smaller than in the 1914 plan.

== See also ==
- List of parks in Portland, Oregon
