= Expo Center station =

Light rail station in Portland, Oregon, U.S.

Expo Center
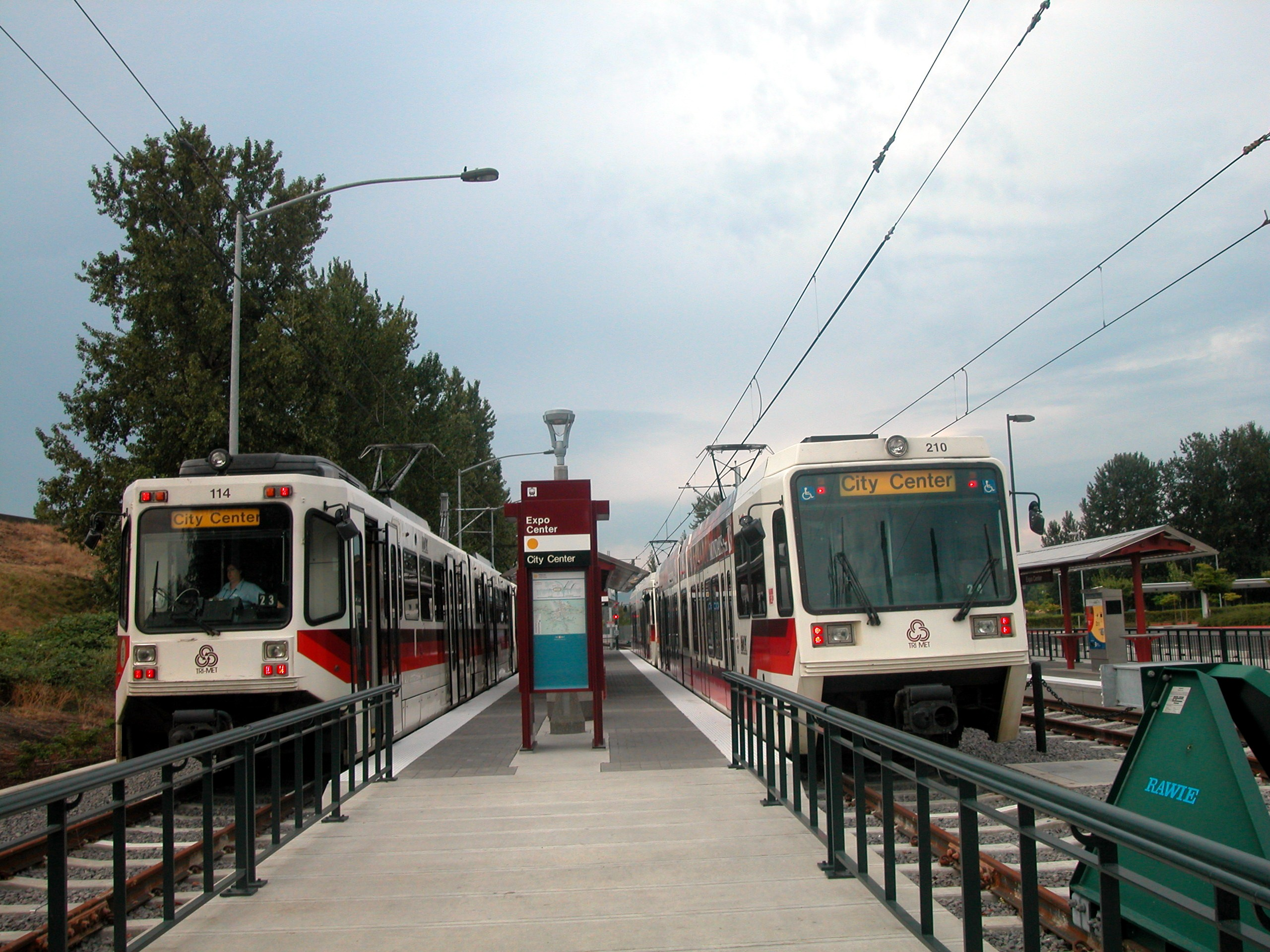

General information
- Location: 2060 North Marine Drive at Portland Expo Center; Portland, Oregon; USA
- Coordinates: 45°36′20″N 122°41′08″W
- Owner: TriMet
- Platforms: 1 side and 1 island platform
- Tracks: 3

Construction
- Parking: 300 total spaces
- Cycle facilities: Lockers
- Accessible: yes

History
- Opened: May 1, 2004

Services
Preceding station	TriMet	Following station
Delta Park/Vanport toward Union Station/NW 5th & Glisan	Yellow Line	Terminus
Location

Expo Center is a light rail station on the MAX Yellow Line in Portland, Oregon, United States. It is the last stop northbound on the Interstate MAX extension.

This station is a large park-and-ride station located on the grounds of the Portland Expo Center. It is set up as a modified side platform station, with the two platforms serving three tracks. The extra track allows the storage of an overflow train for events at the Expo Center. The 300 park-and-ride spaces are free for commuters arriving before 10 am on weekdays for a maximum 24 hours. At all other times, drivers must pay the Expo Center's usual $7–8 parking fee.

Although tracks and electrification end directly inside the station, it is designed to allow a future northbound extension (to Vancouver, Washington) to be easily constructed.

Both the landscaping and the artwork at the station are themed in a Japanese style. This recalls the temporary Civilian Assembly Center that existed here during the early days of World War II, which processed Japanese-Americans upon the enforcement of Executive Order 9066.

== Bus line connections ==
This station is at the Expo Center served by the following bus lines:

- 11 - Rivergate/Marine Dr
- 293 - Yellow Bus

== Unique station features ==
The station includes several unique decorative features relating to the internment camp theme:

- Timber Gateway: Traditional Japanese Gates, with steel internment tags strung among them
- Bronze Trunks: Provide additional seating.
- Bamboo Glass Blocks
- Plaque: A plaque showing the prohibited area as defined in Exclusion Order #26 for those of Japanese ancestry, both alien and non-alien.
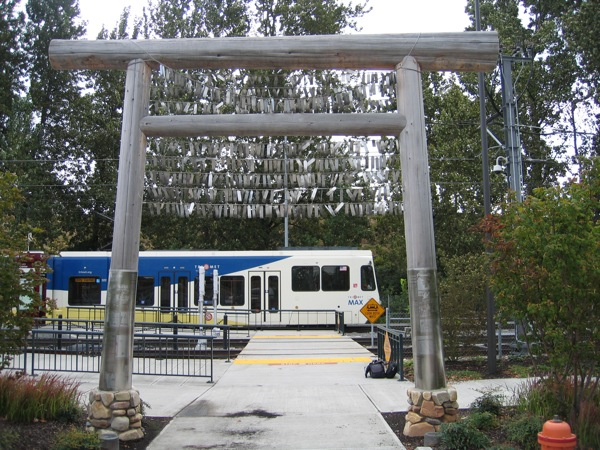
Timber gateway and a waiting train. Facsimiles of historical newspaper headlines are at the base of the wooden poles.

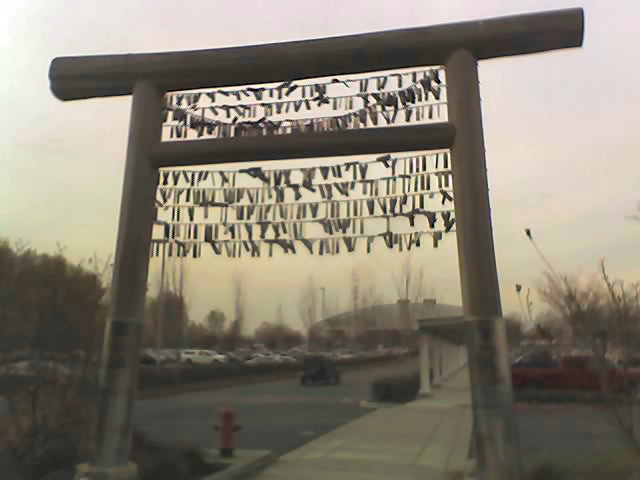
Timber gateway strung with replica steel internment tags.

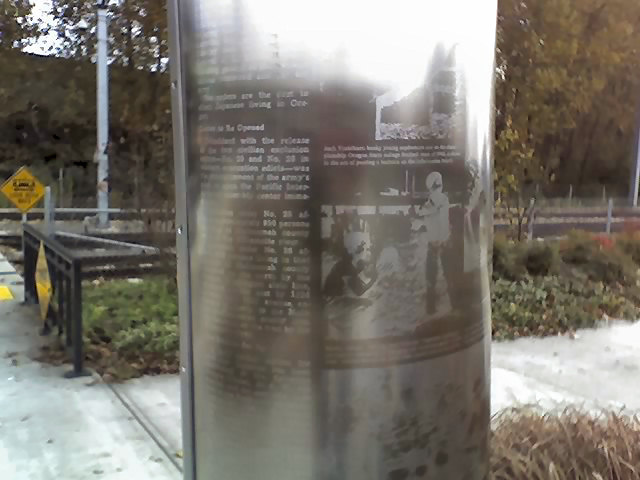
Example of etchings on timbers.

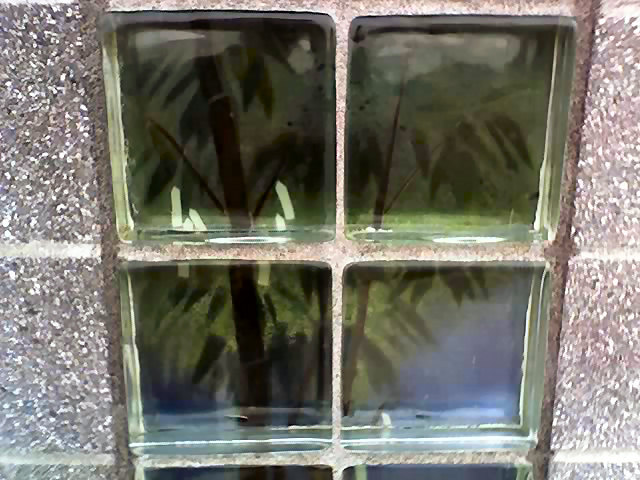
Close-up of bamboo glass blocks on systems building.

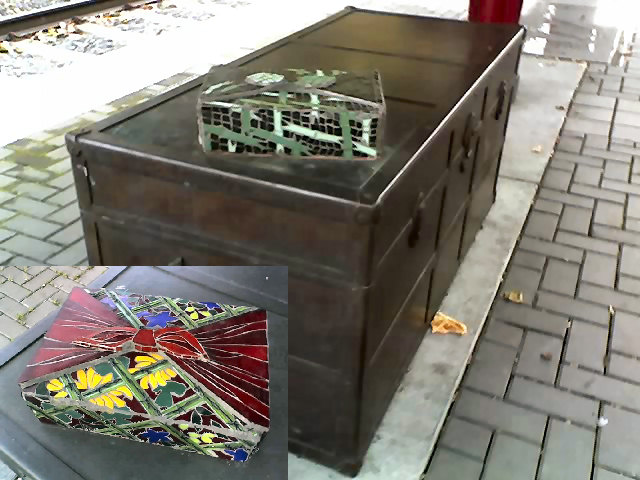
Bronze trunk seating. Inset shows tiled box from the other trunk.

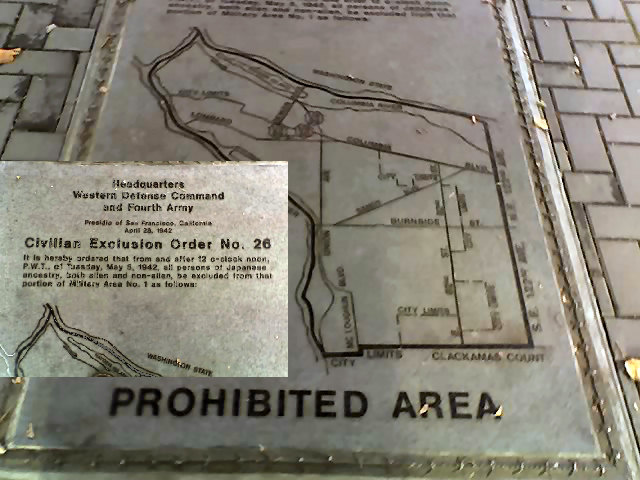
A plaque of the exclusion order #26, showing the prohibited area.
