= Portland Immigrant Statue =

Statue in Portland, Oregon

- The statue in 2020
- Artist: Jim Gion
- Year: 2011
- Subject: Immigrant man
- Location: Portland, Oregon; 45.5594368°N 122.5613468°W

The Portland Immigrant Statue is a bronze sculpture by artist Jim Gion, located in the Parkrose neighborhood of Portland, Oregon. The statue depicts an immigrant man standing with his hands on his hips. A suitcase rests at his side.

The artwork was commissioned by the Parkrose Community Foundation to commemorate the 100th anniversary of the Parkrose neighborhood. Gion, a longtime Portland-based sculptor, was selected to create a piece that would reflect the neighborhood's history and identity.

The statue was unveiled in September 2011 during the Parkrose Centennial Celebration, which featured a parade, a community reception, and the public dedication of the sculpture. It stands at the intersection of Northeast Sandy Boulevard and Killingsworth Street, serving as a prominent gateway marker for the Parkrose neighborhood.

Gion's design was publicly revealed prior to the installation in community events and local press coverage. The statue was noted by the local press as a tribute to the area's immigrant history and as part of a broader effort to foster neighborhood identity.
