= Food carts in Portland, Oregon =

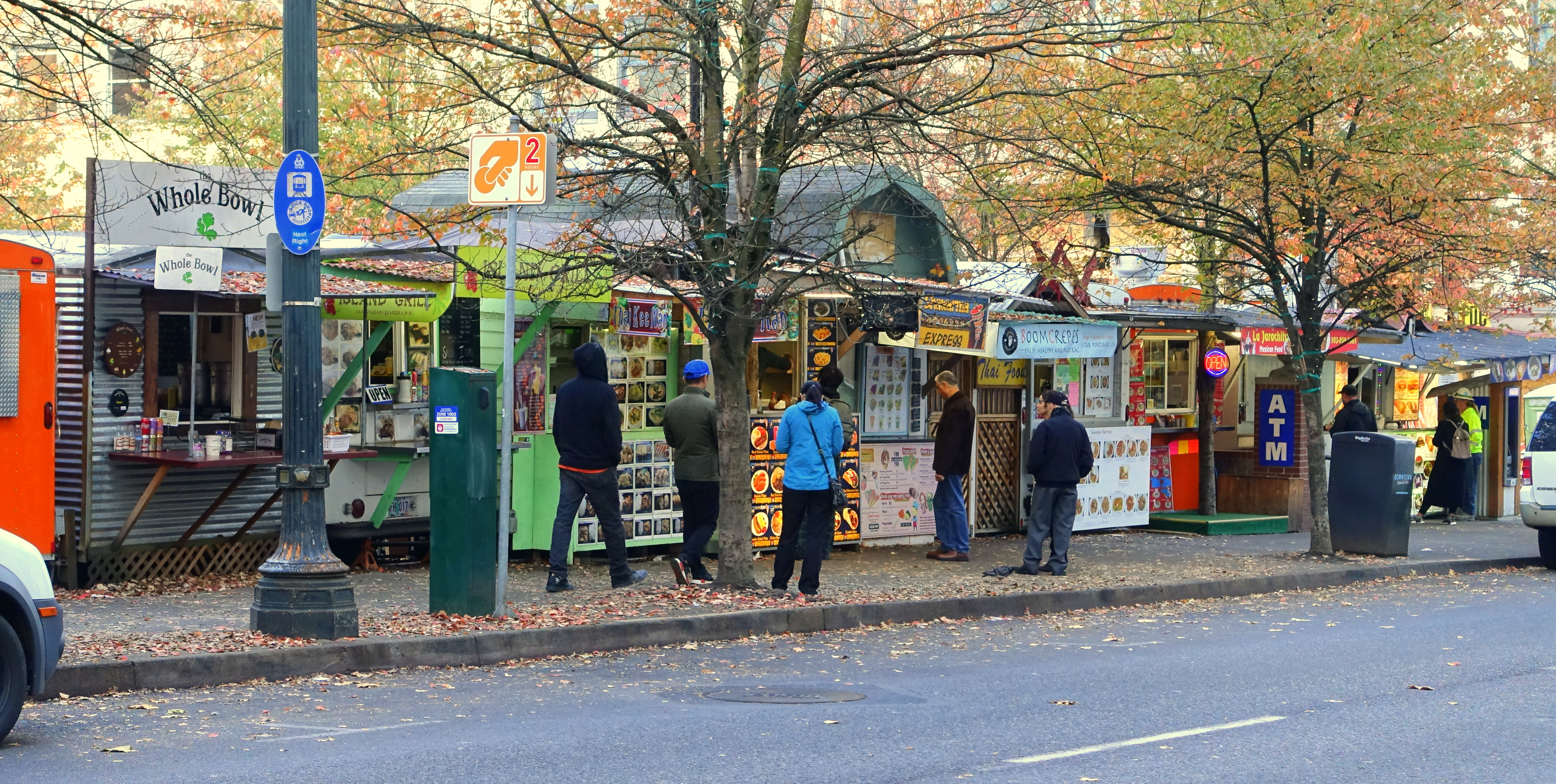
Food carts in 2017

The city of Portland, Oregon, United States, has experienced a boom in the number of food carts due to relatively low regulation compared to other North American cities.

== History ==
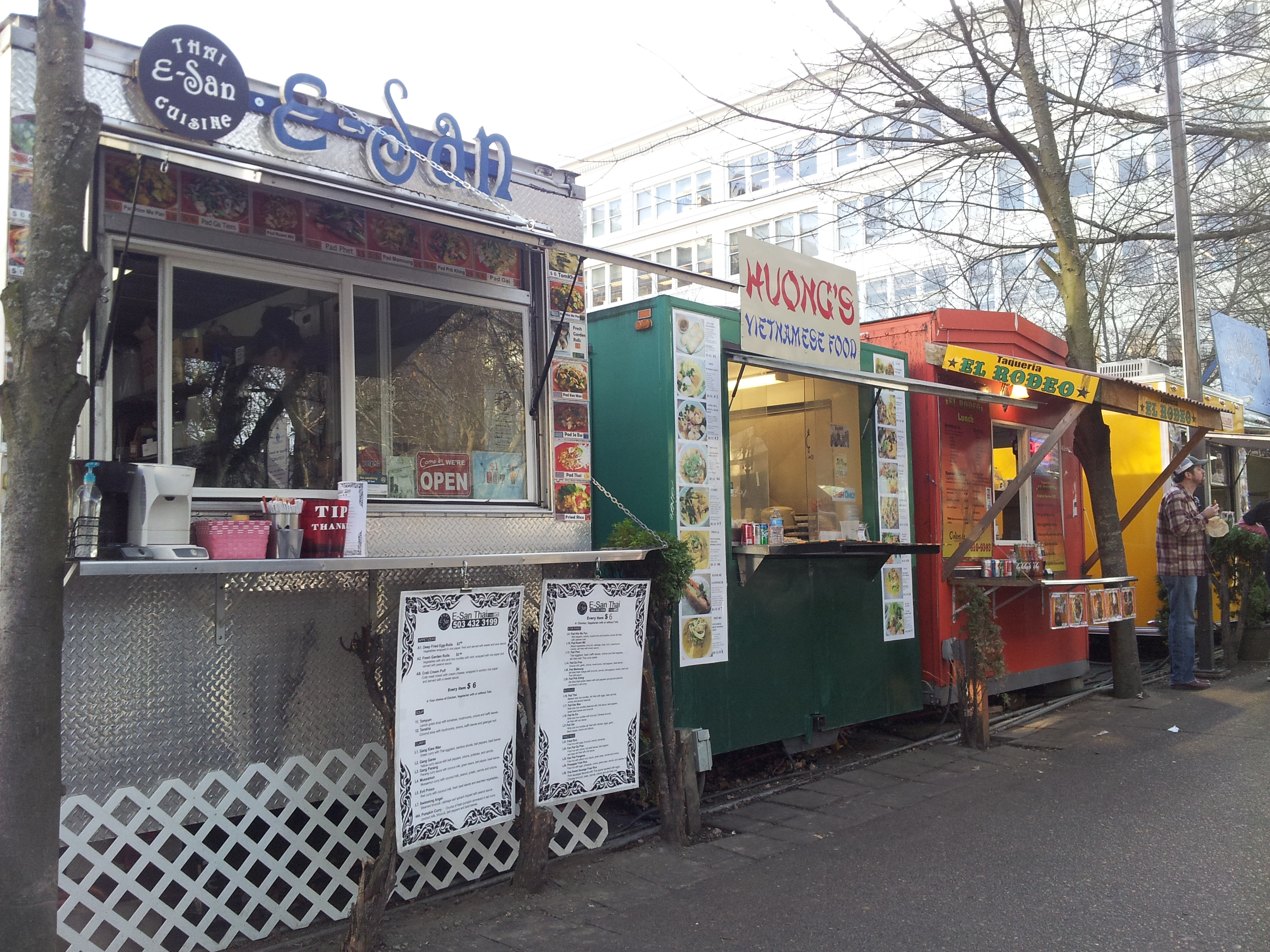
Alder Street food cart pod (2013)

In 1965, the first food cart in Portland, which sold kosher hot dogs, was set up across from Portland City Hall. In 1976, Portland opened up all of its downtown parks to competitive bidding.

A 2001 report in The Oregonian stated Portland was home to 175 carts, with fierce competition for the four cart spaces available since 1987 in the South Park Blocks. A bidding war in February 2001 led to a combined price of $192,000 for the spaces. There was also a large cluster, often referred to as a food cart pod, at Fifth and Stark street, and one food cart had been operating since 1980.

In 2010 it was estimated that there are between 450 and 671 carts citywide. In 2025, Portland had approximately 25 food cart pods and approximately 500 food carts.

Food Cart Week is an annual event in the city. Approximately 130 businesses participated in the fourth event in 2025.

== Regulation ==
Most North American cities sought to make the street for cars in the mid twentieth century, and thus imposed strict regulations on food carts, which led to few food carts remaining. In comparison, Portland has low regulation, such as having nearly no requirement for a food cart to have a particular structure, which makes the cost of entry low, and thus leading to a proliferation of carts. Many regulations are also not enforced as long as health and safety are not impacted.

There has been concerns around hot dog and grilling stands being operated without permits near event venues Providence Park and Moda Center and have been caught committing offenses like discarding grease down the storm drains, selling alcohol to minors and blocking sidewalks. Multnomah County Health Department suspected some have ties with human trafficking and gang activities.

== Notable pods and foods carts ==
Notable food cart pods currently operating in Portland include:

- Cart Blocks
- Cartopia
- Collective Oregon Eateries
- Hawthorne Asylum
- The Heist
- Hinterland Bar and Food Carts
- Midtown Beer Garden
- Nob Hill Food Carts
- Pan y Pueblo, formerly known as Lil' America
- Pod 28
- Portland Mercado
- Prost Marketplace
- Rose City Food Park
- Springwater Cart Park, formerly known as Cartlandia
- Third Avenue Food Cart Pod

Businesses that have operated as food carts in the city include:

- Bake on the Run
- Bark City BBQ
- Bing Mi
- Birrieria La Plaza
- Birrieria PDX
- Botto's BBQ
- Cheese & Crack Snack Shop
- Chicken and Guns
- DC Vegetarian
- El Cubo de Cuba
- Deadstock Coffee
- Desi PDX
- Dirty Lettuce
- E-san Thai Cuisine
- Erica's Soul Food
- Farmer and the Beast
- Fifty Licks
- Flying Fish Company
- Fried Egg I'm in Love
- Frybaby
- The Grilled Cheese Grill
- Gumba
- Jojo
- Kee's Loaded Kitchen
- Kim Jong Grillin'
- Koi Fusion
- Le Bistro Montage Ala Cart
- LoRell's Chicken Shack
- Los Gorditos
- Mama Chow's Kitchen
- Matt's BBQ
- Matta
- MidCity SmashBurger
- Mole Mole
- Monster Smash
- Nacheaux
- Nico's Ice Cream
- Nong's Khao Man Gai
- Off the Griddle
- Paladin Pie
- PDX Sliders
- Round Two, formerly known as Hit the Spot
- Ruthie's
- Shanghai's Best
- Smaaken Waffle Sandwiches
- Stoopid Burger
- Stretch the Noodle
- Sure Shot Burger
- Tamale Boy
- Tierra del Sol
- Tight Tacos
- Tito's Taquitos
- Tokyo Sando
- Viking Soul Food
- The Whole Bowl
- Yoshi's Sushi

=== Defunct ===
Defunct pods include the Alder Street food cart pod (1990s–2019) and Carts on Foster, which closed in 2023. In 2025, the food cart pod Foster Food Carts began operating on the site previously occupied by Carts on Foster.

Defunct food carts include Baby Blue Pizza, Baon Kainan, Cultured Caveman, El Gallo Taqueria, Gracie's Apizza, Holy Trinity Barbecue, Leaky Roof Gastropub, PDX671, Reeva (2022–2025), and Sweet Lorraine's.

== See also ==
- Culture of Portland, Oregon
- Pacific Northwest cuisine
