= Someday (bar) =

Restaurant in Portland, Oregon, U.S.

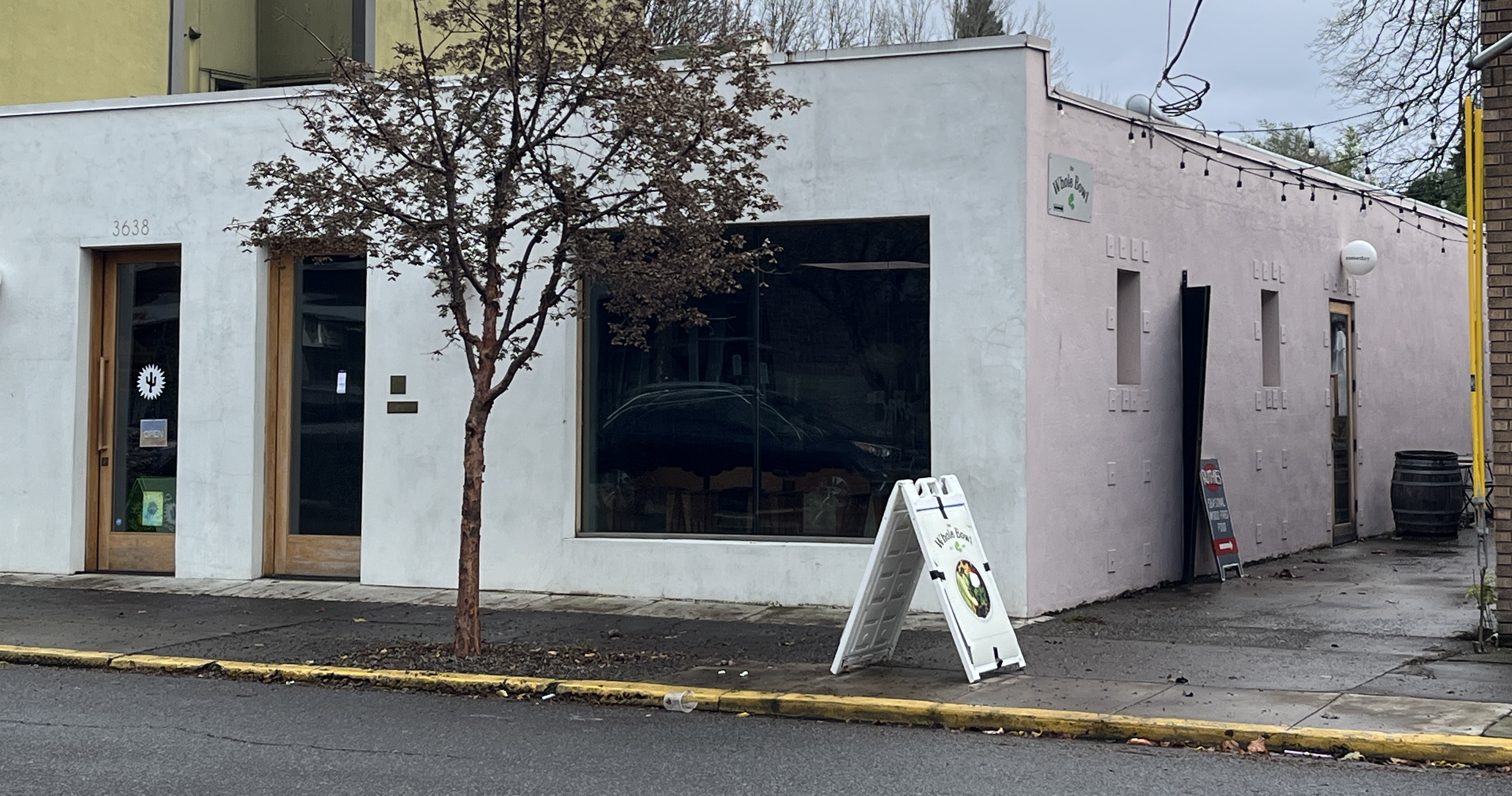
- The bar's exterior, 2024
- Interactive map of Someday

Restaurant information
- Owners: Jessica Baesler; Graham Files
- Location: 3634 Southeast Division Street, Portland, Multnomah, Oregon, 97202, United States
- Coordinates: 45.5046°N 122.6257°W
- Website: somedaypdx.com

Someday (sometimes Someday Bar) is a bar and restaurant in Portland, Oregon, United States. Spouses Jessica Baesler and Graham Files are co-owners.

== Description ==
The cocktail bar Someday operates on Division Street in southeast Portland's Richmond neighborhood. The interior has a U-shaped walnut bar. Someday's patio hosts food carts.

The food menu includes Brillat Savarin cheese with local honey, chicken liver mousse with balsamic onions, and sausages from Otto's Sausage Kitchen. Among drinks is the Tiger Porch, which is a tequila sour with tamarind, and the Brother's Keeper, which has clove and cinnamon-infused bitters. Someday also serves natural wine and a vermouth blend.

== History ==
The bar opened on January 2, 2020. During the COVID-19 pandemic, owners sold beer and wine via take-out, and participated in an effort to change a law that did not allow alcoholic beverages to be sold via delivery and pickup. Someday launched the collaborative "Someone series" in 2023. Among food carts that have operated in Someday's court are Alley Mezza (Mediterranean), Ash Woodfired (pizza), Let's Roll (sushi), and Ruthie's.

== Reception ==
Katherine Chew Hamilton, Margaret Seiler, and Matthew Trueherz included the business in Portland Monthly's 2023 list of the city's ten best bars.
