= Third Avenue Food Cart Pod =

Food cart pod in Portland, Oregon, U.S.

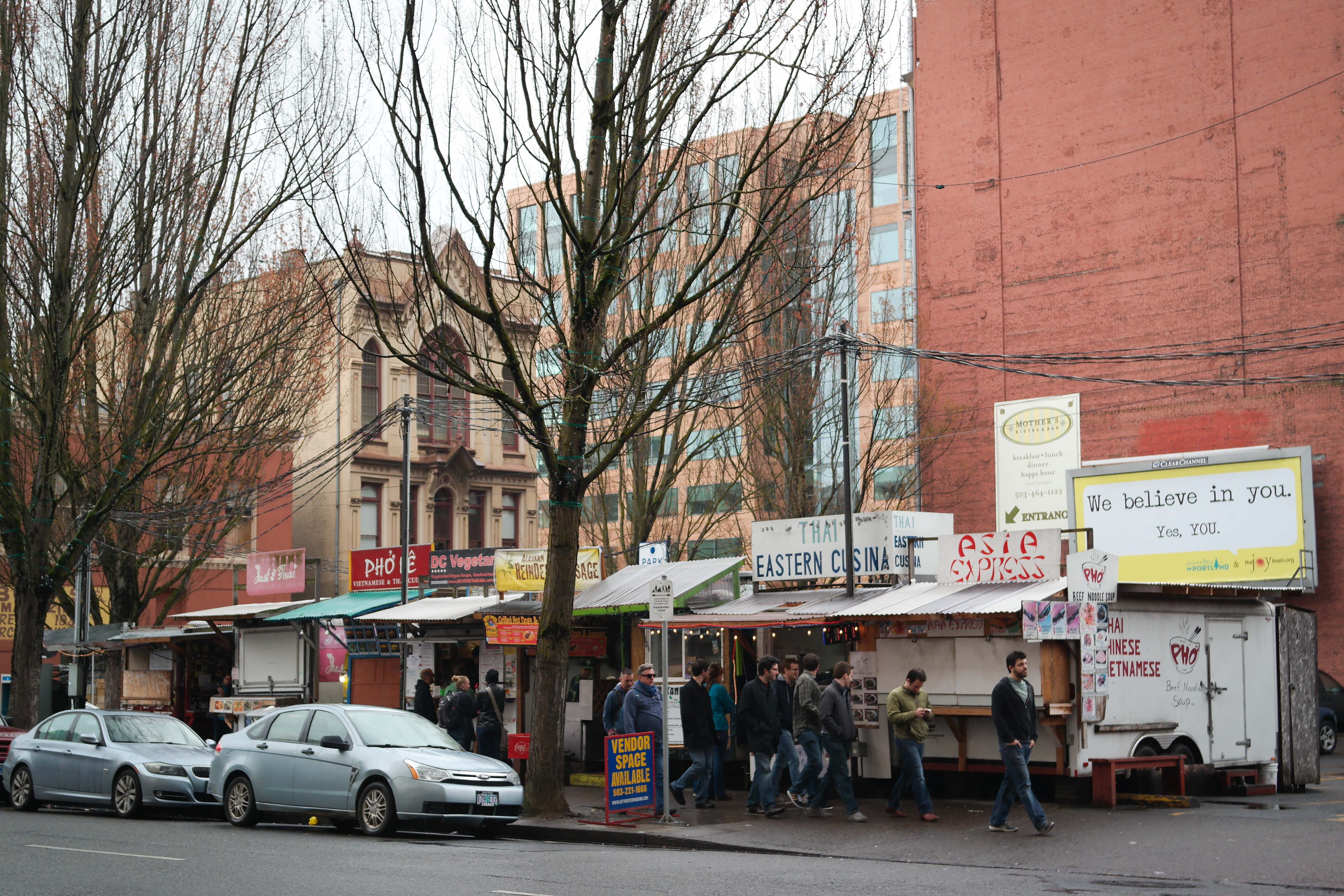
- The food cart pod in 2014
- Interactive map of Third Avenue Food Cart Pod
- Coordinates: 45.5199°N 122.6744°W

The Third Avenue Food Cart Pod is a food cart pod in Portland, Oregon, United States. Notable tenants have included The Grilled Cheese Grill, Mama Chow's Kitchen, and Stretch the Noodle.

== Description ==
The Third Avenue Food Cart Pod is a food cart pod on 3rd Avenue between Washington and Stark Streets in downtown Portland. Condé Nast Traveler has described the pod as a "no-frills", with only carts and no tables or tents. The pod is sometimes called "Gyro District" because of the many carts serving Middle Eastern cuisine such as gyros, hummus, and shawarma. The popular is most popular at lunch time.

== History ==
The pod has hosted carts serving Mexican and Thai cuisine. Tenants at the pod have included The Grilled Cheese Grill, Mama Chow's Kitchen, Stretch the Noodle, and Sumo Sushi. La Piñata Takos has also operated at the site.

== Reception ==
Condé Nast Traveler included the pod in a 2018 list of Portland's ten best food trucks. In 2023, after Food & Wine recommend the pod and the Fifth Avenue carts as a starting point for experiencing the city's food carts, Michael Russell of The Oregonian said both pods "have seen better days".
