= Cultured Caveman =

Defunct restaurant in Portland, Oregon, U.S.

- Interactive map of Cultured Caveman

Restaurant information
- Established: 2012
- Closed: 2020
- Location: 8233 North Denver Avenue, Portland, Multnomah, Oregon, 97217, United States
- Coordinates: 45.5829°N 122.6872°W

Cultured Caveman was a restaurant in Portland, Oregon, United States. The business started as a group of food carts, before opening a brick and mortar establishment in 2014. The restaurant was considered the first paleo food cart on the West Coast. It closed permanently in 2020.

== Description ==
The 60-seat counter service restaurant Cultured Caveman operated in north Portland's Kenton neighborhood. The interior had communal tables and a play area for children with a dinosaur theme.

Cultured Caveman's paleolithic diet-focused menu emphasized meats and vegetables, with dairy-, gluten-, and soy-free options. The menu included almond-stuffed and bacon-wrapped dates, Brussels sprouts fried in beef tallow, chicken tenders, and pork carnitas. The restaurant also served meat chili, meatloaf, a bone broth soup made from knuckle bone marrow, a salad with cabbage, carrots, and kale, and another with beets, jicama, and walnuts.

== History ==
Joe Ban and Heather Hunter were the owners of Cultured Caveman, which began as a group of food carts before operating solely as a brick and mortar establishment in 2014. The first food cart was installed on Alberta Street in northeast Portland in 2012, following a successful fundraiser for the cart. A second location opened later in 2012. The business grew to operates three food carts: the Alberta Street location at 14th Avenue, another on Hawthorne Boulevard at 41st Avenue, and a third in downtown Portland at Southwest 3rd Avenue and Stark Street.

The duo claimed Cultured Caveman was the first "paleo-friendly" food cart on the West Coast and raised $30,000 via Kickstarter to fund the brick and mortar restaurant, which opened in a space that previously housed an E-san Thai Cuisine location. As of 2016, Cultured Caveman hosted the musician Mr. Ben weekly.

Cultured Caveman closed permanently in 2020, during the COVID-19 pandemic.

== Reception ==
In 2012, Michael Russell of The Oregonian said Cultured Caveman was among Portland's best new food carts. The business ws also included in the newspaper's list of the top 50 food carts. Cultured Caveman received honorable mention in the Best Gluten-Free Restaurant category of Willamette Week's annual 'Best of Portland' readers' poll in 2015. It was a runner-up in the same poll's Best Paleo Options category in 2016 and 2017. It ranked third and was also a runner-up in the Best Paleo Options category in 2018 and 2020, respectively.

== See also ==
- COVID-19 pandemic in Portland, Oregon
- Food carts in Portland, Oregon
- Impact of the COVID-19 pandemic on the food industry
- Impact of the COVID-19 pandemic on the restaurant industry in the United States
- List of defunct restaurants of the United States
