= Reeva (restaurant) =

Defunct restaurant in Portland, Oregon, U.S.

Reeva Cafe y Cocina a la Leña
- Interactive map of Reeva Cafe y Cocina a la Leña

Restaurant information
- Established: April 2022
- Owners: Roberto Hernandez Guerrero; Roseva Alcerro
- Food type: Latin American
- Location: Portland, Multnomah, Oregon, United States
- Coordinates: 45°33′03″N 122°35′01″W

Reeva Cafe y Cocina a la Leña, or simply Reeva, was a restaurant in Portland, Oregon, United States. The Latino-owned business was established by Roberto Hernandez Guerrero and Roseva Alcerro in 2022. It served Neapolitan pizzas with Latin American ingredients, among other dishes. Reeva garnered a positive reception and was named one of Portland's best new food carts by The Oregonian and Eater Portland. It closed permanently in 2025.

== Description ==
The Latino-owned restaurant Reeva operated from a food cart on Sandy Boulevard in northeast Portland's Roseway neighborhood. A nearby courtyard had tables made from oak barrels as well as potted plants. Influenced by Honduran, Italian, Mexican, and Peruvian cuisines, Reeva served Neapolitan pizzas with ingredients such as jalapeño, pepperoni, Mama Lil's Peppers, pesto, and red onion. Other special pizzas used burrata, cactus chimichurri, and prosciutto. The Machu pizza had a salsa Hauncaína base and Peruvian ingredients such as a sauce with cheese and chilis. The menu included a "pizzaleada", based on the Honduran baleada with refried beans, cheese, and sour cream. The restaurant also served baked chilaquiles, steak and eggs, and huevos rotos, which had egg, wood-fired potatoes, arugula, and romesco. Coffee was on the breakfast menu; among espresso drinks were cafe con leches and cortados. The Green G.O.A.T. was a smoothie with fermented coconut yogurt, fruit, ginger, seasonal greens, lime, and mint.

== History ==
Spouses Roberto Hernandez Guerrero and Roseva Alcerro started Reeva as a food cart in April 2022. As of 2023, Reeva was one of two pizzerias in Portland serving portafoglio pizza.

In November 2025, Reeva closed indefinitely after Guerrero was denied re-entry to the U.S. The food cart was put up for sale in January 2026.

== Reception ==
Reeva ranked second in The Oregonian's list of Portland's best new food carts of 2022. In his list of the ten best dishes he ate in the city in 2022, the newspaper's Micheal Russell ranked the pizzaleada sixth and wrote, "in its basic form, the combination of chewy dough, melted mozzarella, sour cream (and perhaps the addition of a flash-cooked egg), will be one of the tastiest things you eat this year".

The business won in the Best New Food Cart of Eater Portland's annual Eater Awards in 2022. The website's Janey Wong included Reeva in a 2023 list of twelve "remarkable" restaurants in the Rose City Park and Roseway neighborhoods, and Brooke Jackson-Glidden and Rebecca Roland included the business in a 2024 overview of the best pizzas in the Portland metropolitan area. Wong and Nick Woo also included Reeva in the website's 2024 guide to Portland's "most outstanding" food carts. The business was also included in the website's 2025 overview of Portland's best food carts.

In 2023, Katherine Chew Hamilton included the Huitlacoche pizza in Portland Monthly's overview of the city's rarest regional dishes and Lindsay D. Mattison ranked the business number twenty in Tasting Table's list of Portland's best pizza. Krista Garcia included Reeva in The Infatuation's 2024 list of the city's best food carts.

== See also ==
- Food carts in Portland, Oregon
- Hispanics and Latinos in Portland, Oregon
- Pizza in Portland, Oregon
