= Sure Shot Burger =

Restaurant in Portland, Oregon, U.S.

- Interactive map of Sure Shot Burger

Restaurant information
- Chef: Nick Jarvis; Will Kuhns; Aaron Wilcenski
- Location: 5013 Northeast 42nd Avenue, Portland, Multnomah, Oregon, 97218, United States
- Coordinates: 45.5592°N 122.6206°W
- Website: sureshotburger.com

Sure Shot Burger, formerly known as Rough Draft Burger Shop, is a restaurant in Portland, Oregon.

== Description ==
Sure Shot Burger operates in the parking lot of Oaksire Brewing's beer hall, in northeast Portland's Concordia neighborhood at the border of Cully. Among burgers is the "double", which is the restaurant's most popular and includes two patties, cheese, onion, pickle, and a house sauce. The menu also includes Brussels sprouts, fried cauliflower, waffle fries, "broccoli supreme", and beer. Sure Shot has also served a hot dog hamburger.

== History ==
The restaurant was spun-off from the Seattle-based pop-up Rough Draft Burger Shop, which was "itself a spinoff from a fancy ticketed dinner and event series". In 2020, White Center-based Good Day Donuts worked with Rough Draft to serve smash burgers on glazed raised doughnuts. Rough Draft was slated to open in Lower Queen Anne in the summer of 2021.

In Portland, Rough Draft operated in a red-colored food cart at Uptown Beer in southwest Portland, and later rebranded to Sure Shot Burger and operated outside Oakshire Brewing. Nick Jarvis, Will Kuhns, and Aaron Wilcenski have been chefs.

== Reception ==
In 2020, writers (including Karen Brooks and Bill Oakley) ranked Rough Draft's single cheeseburger third in Portland Monthly's list of the city's twenty best cheeseburgers. Oakley also said Rough Draft had some of his favorite burgers in his 2021 "guide to dining" in Portland. Wyatt Fossett of the Daily Hive said the burgers "are so deliciously dynamite that we will forever rave about the punchy flavor and lack of complication".

Naomi Tomky included Rough Draft in Thrillist's 2021 list of the fourteen best burger establishments in Seattle. Michael Russell ranked Rough Draft second in The Oregonian's list of Portland's thirteen best smash burgers. Sure Shot ranked first in the best burgers category of the newspaper's Readers Choice Awards in 2024.

In 2023, Jashayla Pettigrew included Sure Shot in KOIN's list of the city's seven best smash burgers, based on Yelp reviews, and Axios Portland included the restaurant in an overview of Portland's best burgers. In Eater Portland's 2024 overview of the city's "best, beefiest" burgers, writers said: "Sure Shot is a burger shack in every sense of the word. The burgers here are simple, but hover near smash-patty perfection." They also said of the double burger, "As a whole, it has all of the trappings of a fast food burger, if a fast food burger was even richer, cheesier, and had twice the amount of caramelization."

== See also ==
- List of hamburger restaurants
