= Round Two (restaurant) =

Restaurant in Portland, Oregon, U.S.

Restaurant information
- Established: 2014
- Owner: Jeremy Sivers
- Location: Portland, Multnomah, Oregon, United States

Round Two, formerly Hit the Spot, is a restaurant in Portland, Oregon, United States. Owner Jeremy Sivers started the business as a booth at a farmers' market in southeast Portland in 2014. Hit the Spot started operating from a food cart in 2018 and moved into a brick and mortar space in 2022. Hit the Spot closed in September 2025, before reopening as Round Two in December. The business operates from a food cart.

== Description ==
In addition to hamburgers, the menu has included fried chicken sandwiches, hot dogs, and French fries. Milkshake varieties include chocolate, strawberry, and vanilla. Add-ons include Coney sauce and nacho cheese. For breakfast, Hit the Spot has served breakfast burritos and sandwiches, as well as French toast sticks. Since the business rebranded as Round Two, there is a focus on Wagyu sliders. The restaurant also serves French fries cookied in Wagyu beef tallow.

== History ==
Hit the Spot started as a booth at the Montavilla Farmers Market in southeast Portland in 2014. The business began serving smash burgers across the street from the original location of Killer Burger, on Northeast Sandy Boulevard, in September 2018. Upon opening, owner Jeremy Sivers started a program offering 10 percent discounts to local military personnel, single parents, and teachers. In December 2018, the Portland Mercury described plans for Hit the Spot to launch a breakfast menu and ice cream options in January 2019. Hit the Spot was burglarized in 2019.

In April 2022, Brooke Jackson-Glidden of Eater Portland reported on Hit the Spot's plans to operate in the brick and mortar space previously occupied by Brunch Box on Southeast Morrison Street. Portland Monthly and The Oregonian also reported on the plans. Hit the Spot opened in the new space on August 31.

Sivers sometimes handed out complimentary gummy hamburgers. On September 8, 2025, Hit the Spot closed, citing financial reasons. However, in December, the owners rebranded the business and began operating from a food cart as Round Two. Round Two sold approximately 300 burgers during Round Two's "soft opening".

== Reception ==
Karen Brooks, Bill Oakley, and other writers ranked Hit the Spot second in Portland Monthly's 2020 list of the city's 20 best cheeseburgers. Oakley also recommended Hit the Spot in a 2021 "guide to dining" in the city published by Eater Portland. In The Oregonian's 2021 list of seven "great Portland burgers that didn't quite fit our smash ranking (but you still need to try)", Michael Russell wrote, "I figured the greasy good cheeseburgers ($5) at this 2019 Best New Food Cart honoree were a lock for a Top 10 spot on this list. In the past, the blue and orange truck just across from the original Killer Burger did just about everything right, with beef seared to a gorgeous crust, a nicely griddled bun and a slight tingle from some smoky chipotle aioli. But on our visit for this roundup, owner Jeremy Sivers told us he no longer smashes his burgers, opting for pre-formed patties instead. It's still a good burger, just not right for our smash burger list." Reporting on Hit the Spot's closure, Alex Frane of Portland Monthly said the business "helped usher in the smashburger craze". When the "reimagined" business opened as Round Two, KOIN said Hit the Spot "emerged as a pioneer in Portland's smash burger space ".
