= Pod 28 =

Food cart pod in Portland, Oregon, U.S.

- Logo
- Location: Portland, Oregon, United States
- Interactive map of Pod 28
- Coordinates: 45.5219°N 122.6375°W
- Website: pod28pdx.com

Pod 28 (also known as Pod 28 Laurelhurst Food Carts) is a food cart pod in Portland, Oregon, United States. It operates in southeast Portland's Buckman neighborhood.

== Description ==
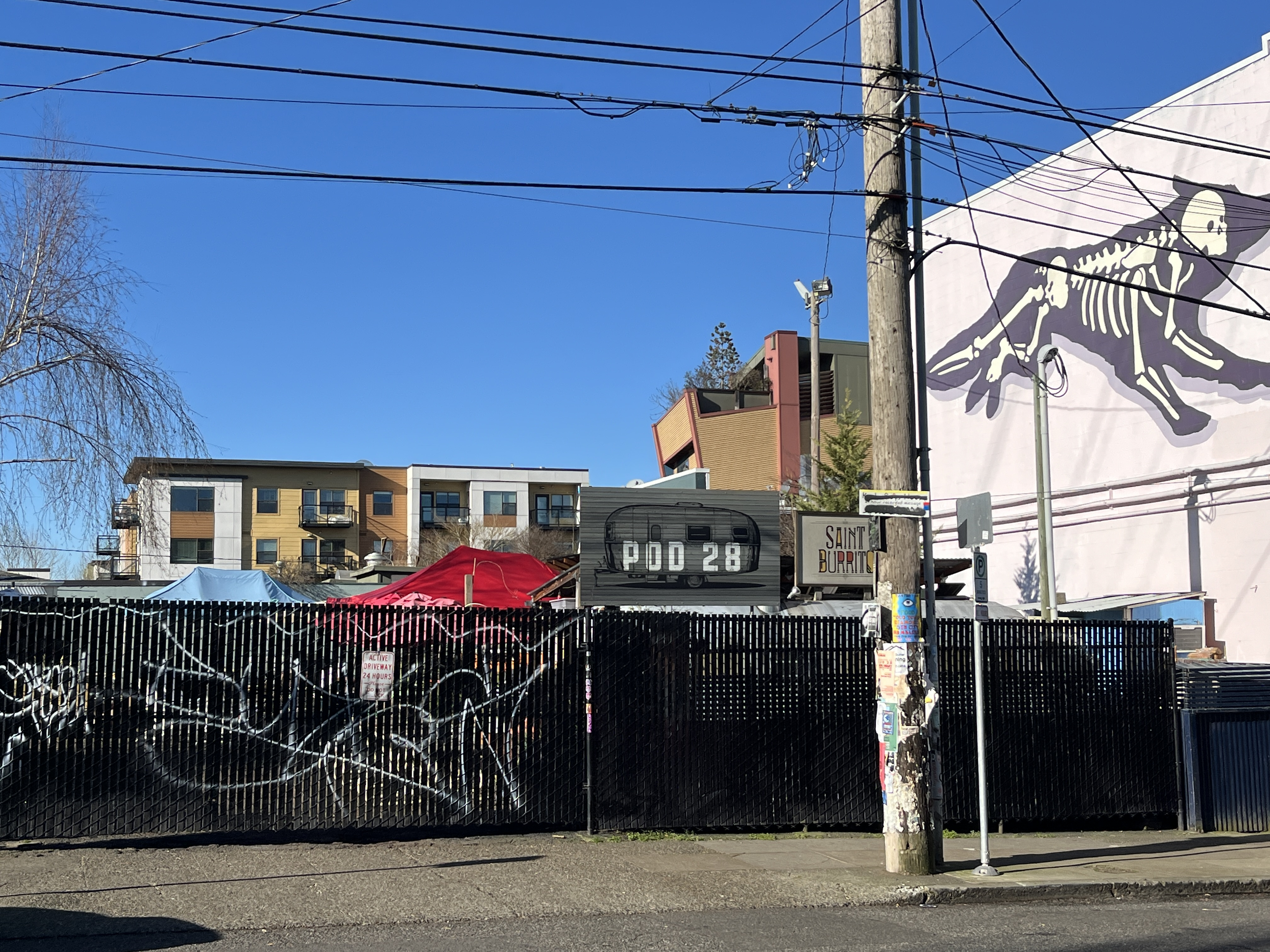
Pod 28 from across the street, 2025

Pod 28 is a food cart pod on 28th Avenue, just south of Burnside Street, in southeast Portland's Buckman neighborhood. According to Condé Nast Traveler, "This tiny, blink-and-you'll-miss it pod in has been going strong for a decade, with a casual charm that's hard to match." In a 2018 overview of the city's best food trucks, the magazine said, "There's a boho vibe to the lot, with its unruly planters and smattering of mismatched tables. It all adds to the casual charm." The pod has fire pits, picnic tables, and a tent covering. The Guardian has described Pod 28 as both "ramshackle" and "a treasure".

== History ==
In 2018, the pod had a beer bus called Captured by Porches (or Captured Beer Bus) and five food carts, including Burrasca, The Grilled Cheese Grill, Güero, Steak Frites PDX, and Wolf and Bear's. Subsequent tenants have included Crave Creperie, Egyptian Bros, Fifty Licks, FOMO Chicken, and Saint Burrito. Le Pantry also operated at the pod.

== Reception ==
San Diego Magazine called Pod 28 a "superb cluster of carts" in 2014. In 2018, Serious Eats said, "The pod is a thriving example of success in an industry that sees plenty of turnover—even in a place like the Rose City, where it seems some people aren't happy with their meal unless it came out of a converted trailer." The website also described Pod 28 as a "small pod with excellent quality throughout". Thom Hilton included the pod in Eater Portland's 2023 overview of recommended businesses along the "restaurant row" of East 28th Avenue.
