= Botto's BBQ =

Barbecue restaurant in Portland, Oregon, U.S.

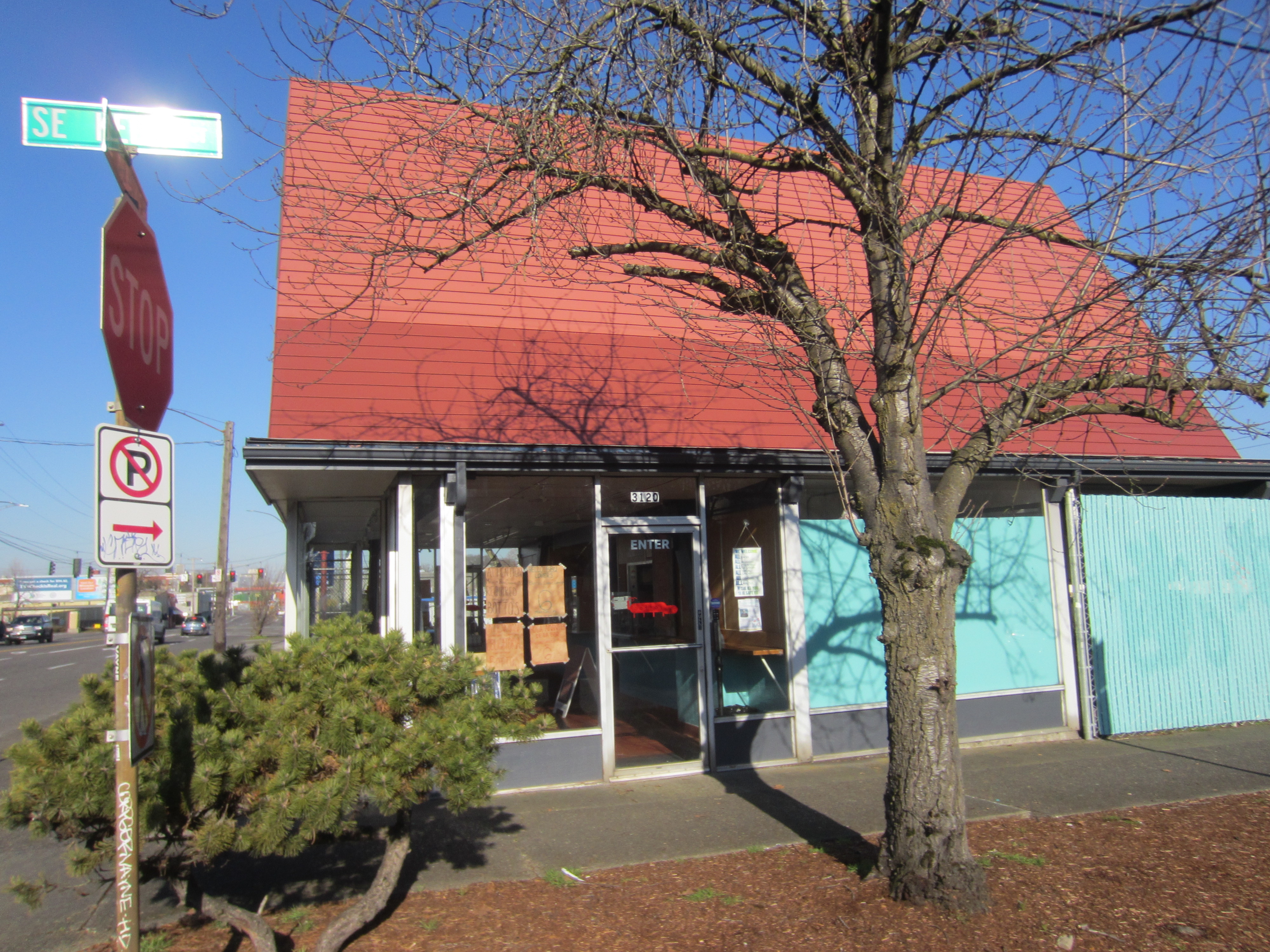
- The restaurant's exterior in 2021
- Interactive map of Botto's BBQ

Restaurant information
- Established: 2016
- Owner: Darren Bottinelli
- Location: 3120 Southeast Milwaukie Avenue, Portland, Multnomah, Oregon, 97202, United States
- Coordinates: 45.5004°N 122.6541°W
- Website: bottosbbq.com

Botto's BBQ (formerly known as Botto Barbecue) is a barbecue restaurant in Portland, Oregon, United States. Established in 2016, the business initially operated as a food cart in northwest Portland. Following a temporary closure, it relaunched with a new name in 2017. In 2020, Botto's relocated to a brick and mortar space in southeast Portland's Brooklyn neighborhood.

== Description ==
The barbecue restaurant Botto's BBQ operates from an A-frame building on Milwaukie Avenue in southeast Portland's Brooklyn neighborhood. Meat options include beef brisket, beef ribs, and sausages. The menu also includes brisket hash, poutine, kolaches with meat (including a sausage and cheese variety), coleslaw, and potato salad.

== History ==
Darren Bottinelli started the business as a food cart called Botto Barbecue in 2016, operating in northwest Portland. Following a temporary closure, Bottinelli relaunched as Botto's BBQ in 2019. Michael Russell of The Oregonian said of the temporary closure: "Without Botto, Portland's smoked meat scene became a lot less competitive."

In 2020, the business relocated to a brick and mortar space on Milwaukie Avenue that previously housed a teriyaki stand and later Pok Pok Wing. For Lardo's Chefwich program in 2021, Bottinelli created a smoked turkey sandwich with hot link stuffing and sage gravy on a hoagie roll, served with turkey broth for dipping.

== Reception ==
Botto's has garnered a positive reception, especially for its brisket and ribs. Michael Russell ranked Botto's seventh in The Oregonian's 2019 list of Portland's best new food carts. In 2024, he said the business "has quietly been putting out some of Portland’s best barbecue from its unassuming Brooklyn neighborhood A-Frame". Russell and Mims Copeland also wrote, "This was one of the under-the-radar BBQ gems that helped transform Portland into one of the best places to find Texas-style barbecue outside of Texas itself when it started as a food cart". Botto's ranked first in the barbecue restaurant category of the newspaper's annual readers choice awards in 2025.

Andrea Damewood included Botto's in Portland Mercury's 2019 overview of the city's "most essential barbecue carts". The restaurant ranked number 54 in Yelp's 2023 list of top places to eat in the U.S. Joseph Howitt included the business in The Franklin Post's 2023 overview of Portland's best barbecue eateries. Katherine Chew Hamilton and Alex Frane included Botto's in Portland Monthly's 2025 overview of the city's best restaurants for Southern barbecue. Ben Coleman included the business in Eater Portland's 2026 list of the city's best barbecue restaurants. Botto's was a finalist in the Best Barbecue category of Willamette Week's annual 'Best of Portland' readers' poll in 2026.

== See also ==
- Food carts in Portland, Oregon
- List of barbecue restaurants
