= Cheese & Crack Snack Shop =

Restaurant in Portland, Oregon, U.S.

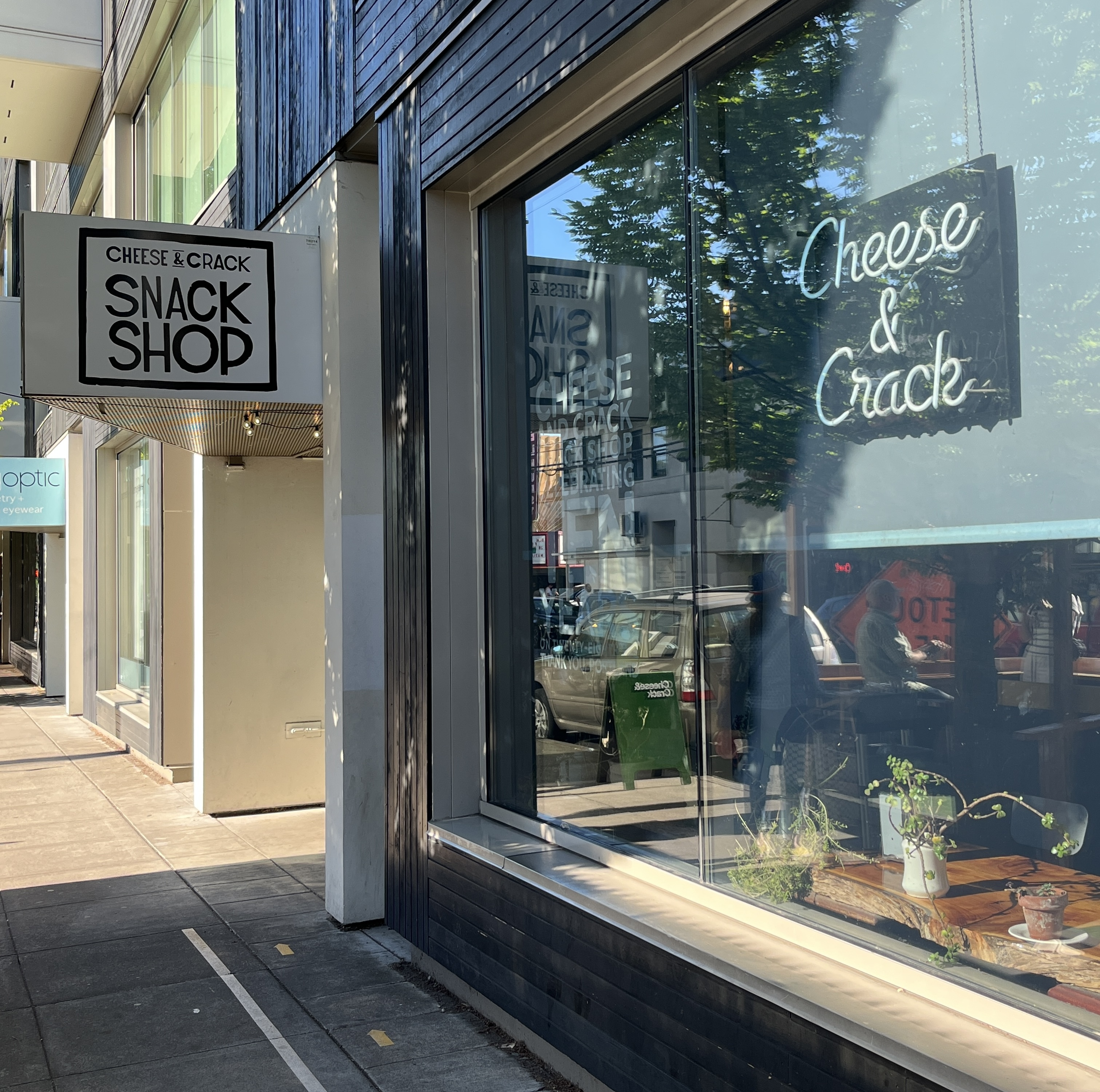
- The restaurant's exterior, 2025
- Interactive map of Cheese & Crack Snack Shop

Restaurant information
- Established: 2012
- Owners: Nathan Hall; William Steuernagel
- Location: 22 Southeast 28th Avenue, Portland, Multnomah, Oregon, 97214, United States
- Coordinates: 45.5225°N 122.6371°W
- Seating capacity: 26
- Website: cheeseandcrack.com

Cheese & Crack Snack Shop is a restaurant in Portland, Oregon, United States. The business started as a food cart on Hawthorne Boulevard before moving into a brick and mortar shop in the southeast Portland part of the Kerns neighborhood in 2014. Cheese & Crack serves charcuterie, macaroni and cheese, sandwiches, soft serve, and sundaes, among other food and drink options. The restaurant has garnered a positive reception, particularly for its ice cream. Cheese & Crack was included in The Oregonian's 2022 list of Portland's best food carts of the past decade and ranked seventh in Yelp's 2023 list of the city's 50 best restaurants.

== Description ==
Cheese & Crack Snack Shop operates on 28th Avenue, near East Burnside Street, in the southeast Portland part of the Kerns neighborhood. It is a queer-owned business described by Thom Hilton of Eater Portland as a "social media sensation" with long queues and "high-profile" customers, including Paul Thomas Anderson and Maya Rudolph. Cheese & Crack has a seating capacity of 26 people. Its interior contains concrete walls, an open kitchen, and pictures of the country musician Dolly Parton. For Pride Month, Cheese & Crack has displayed a cardboard standee of the country singer Reba McEntire in the window. Eater Portland said the indoor and outdoor patio space has a "rustic charm".

=== Menu ===
Cheese & Crack serves charcuterie on stainless steel trays. Boards include house-made crackers, capocollo and roasted turkey meat, and cheeses such as brie ganache, as well as honey, jam, and oatmeal raisin cookies. The sampler plate has a sliced baguette, butter crackers, Dijon mustard, marionberry jam, olives, and pickled cucumbers. The sampler's cheeses include blue cheese from Hooks, brie brûlée, cana de oveja made from Spanish sheep milk, and cheddar from Seattle-based Beecher's Handmade Cheese. Charcuterie packages have also been available via take-out, most frequently during the COVID-19 pandemic.

Cheese & Crack's macaroni and cheese is composed of Gruyère and white cheddar (from Tillamook) mornay and an herb sauce with chives, garlic, lemon, and olive oil. The restaurant has also served biscuit sandwiches for breakfast, a ham sandwich with ham from Tails & Trotters and herb butter, as well as potato chip "nachos" with mornay and pickled lentils.

Among dessert options is soft serve in ice cream cones with chocolate ganache on the bottom to prevent leaking; toppings include chocolate cowboy hats, colorful sprinkles, and varieties of "dust" such as beet, espresso, matcha, and strawberry. Vanilla soft serve is also the base for sundaes; varieties have included banana pudding (with Nilla Wafers), caramel cornflake, and raspberry birthday cake. Another sundae has cookie, ganache, and marshmallow. Drink options include beer, wine (including Prosecco on tap), frosés, and frozen lemonades.

== History ==
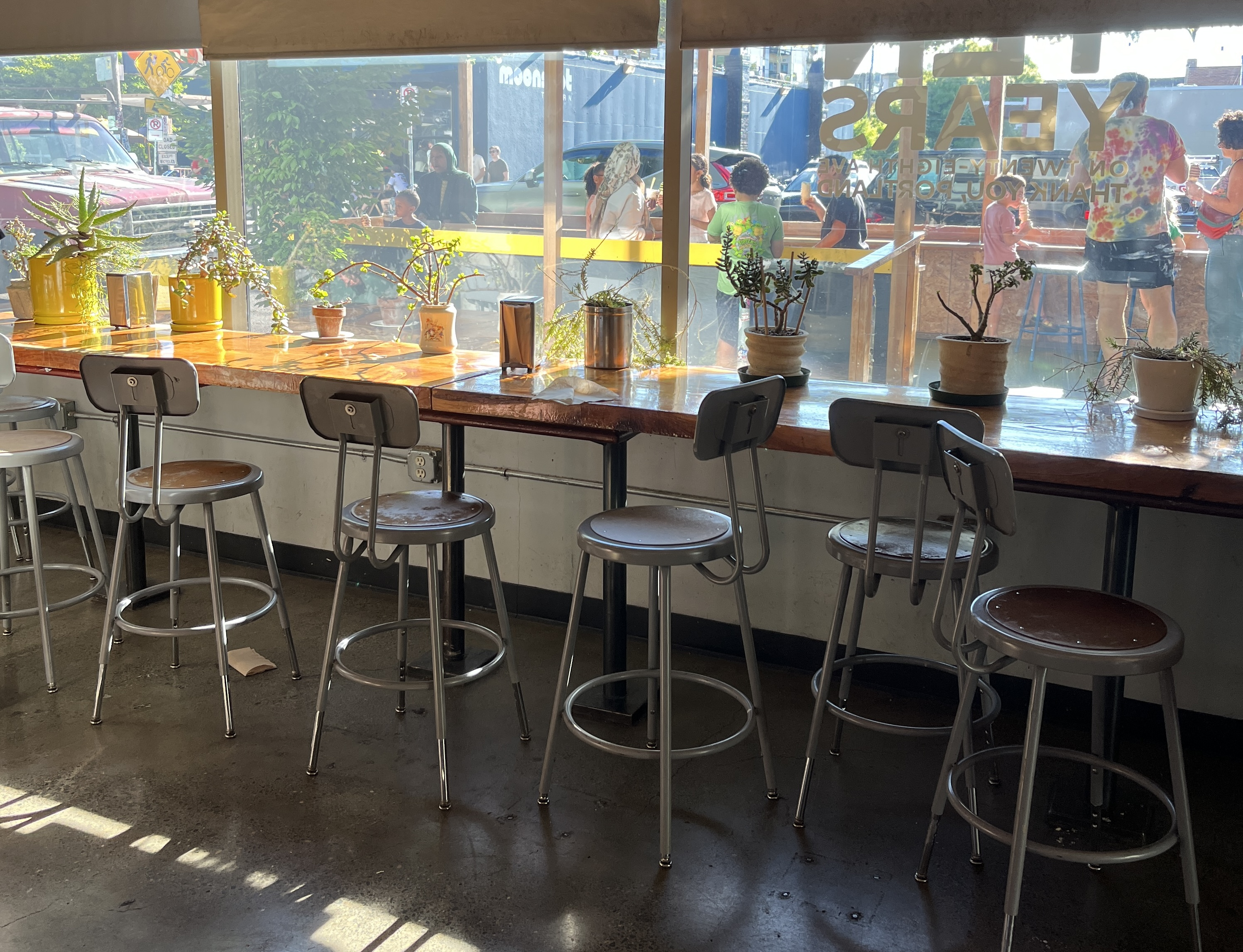
Interior seating, 2025

Cheese & Crack was established in 2012 by business partners Nathan Hall and William Steuernagel. The restaurant started as a food cart on Hawthorne Boulevard before moving into a brick and mortar shop in 2014. The restaurant operates in the space that previously housed Black Bike Cafe, an outpost or sibling establishment of Black Cat Cafe. In 2020, a man wielding a bat demanded Hall to remove a Black Lives Matter sign displayed in a window.

Cheese & Crack has served special dishes for select holidays. On April 20, 2020, for the cannabis holiday "420", the restaurant offered a Munchie Cone. For Halloween in 2022 and 2024, the Eye Scream Sundae had purple ube pudding as "witch goo", chocolate cookie as "dirt", vanilla soft serve, raspberry sauce as "blood", and a gumball resembling an eyeball.

Food critic Keith Lee visited Cheese & Crack in 2025.

== Reception ==
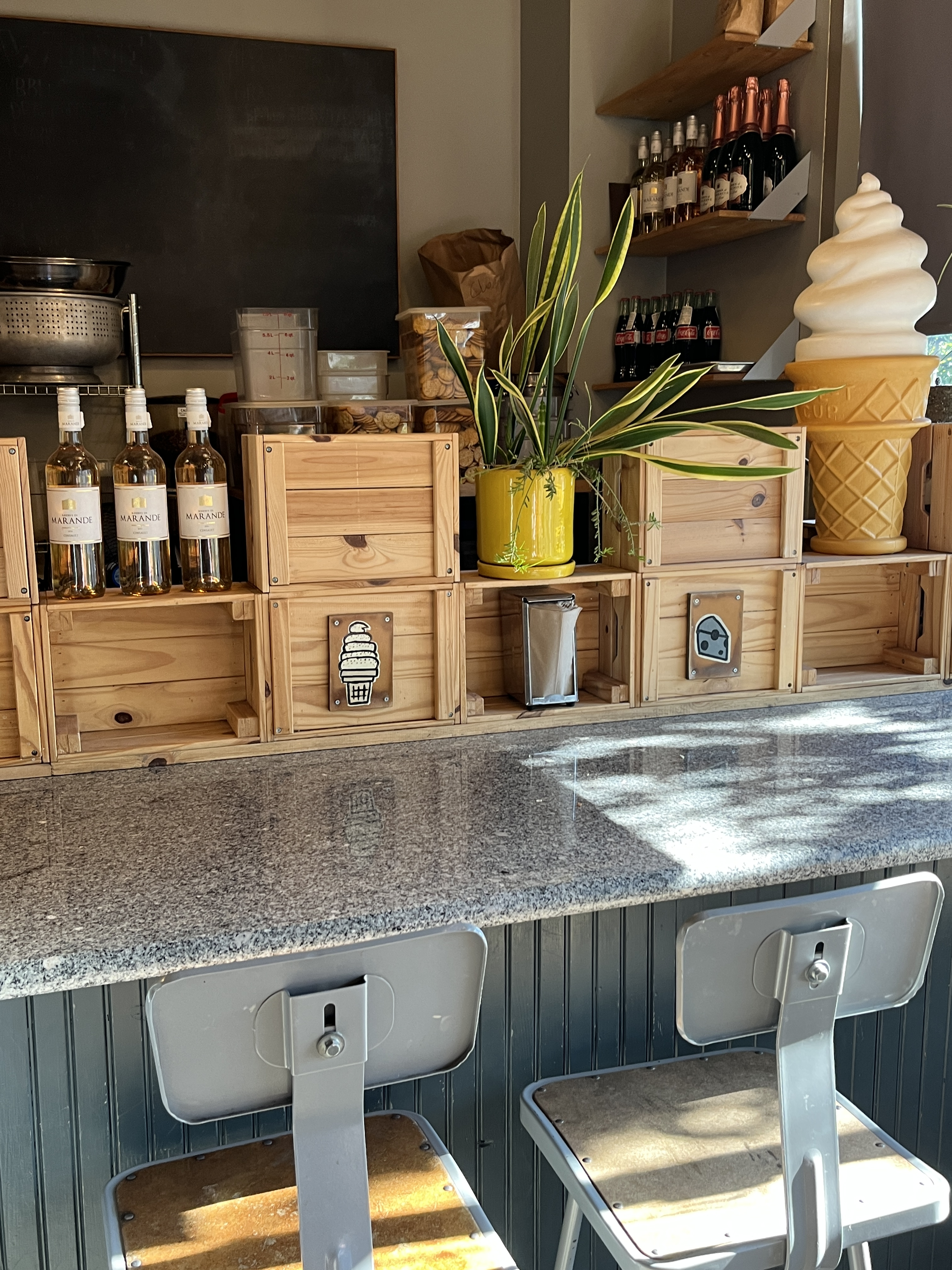
The restaurant's interior in 2025

Willamette Week ranked Cheese & Crack fourth in a 2016 overview of Portland's best soft serve. The newspaper's Andrew Jankowski recommended the restaurant in 2024 as an option for late-night dining. Michael Russell included Cheese & Crack in The Oregonian's 2022 list of Portland's best food carts of the past decade. In 2023, Yelp ranked the business seventh in a list of the city's fifty best restaurants. Cheese & Crack ranked eighth in a list of Portland's best ice cream shops based on Yelp reviews in 2025. In his 2025 review, Lee gave the ice cream with espresso and matcha "dust" a rating of nine out of ten.

Maya MacEvoy included Cheese & Crack in Eater Portland's 2020 list of the city's "top-notch" macaroni and cheese. In 2023, the business was included in an overview of recommended establishments on East 28th Avenue's "restaurant row" by Thom Hilton and Nick Woo and a list of recommended eateries near Laurelhurst Park by Olivia Lee. Hilton has also described Cheese & Crack as a "dairy palace", and the website's Brooke Jackson-Glidden recommended the restaurant for a late-night sundae in 2023. Local drag performer and entertainer Carla Rossi recommended Cheese & Crack in a 2023 dining guide of Portland published by Eater Portland. The website's Michelle Lopez and Janey Wong included the restaurant in 2024 and 2025 overviews of the best ice cream in the Portland metropolitan area.
