= Gumba (restaurant) =

Italian restaurant in Portland, Oregon, U.S.

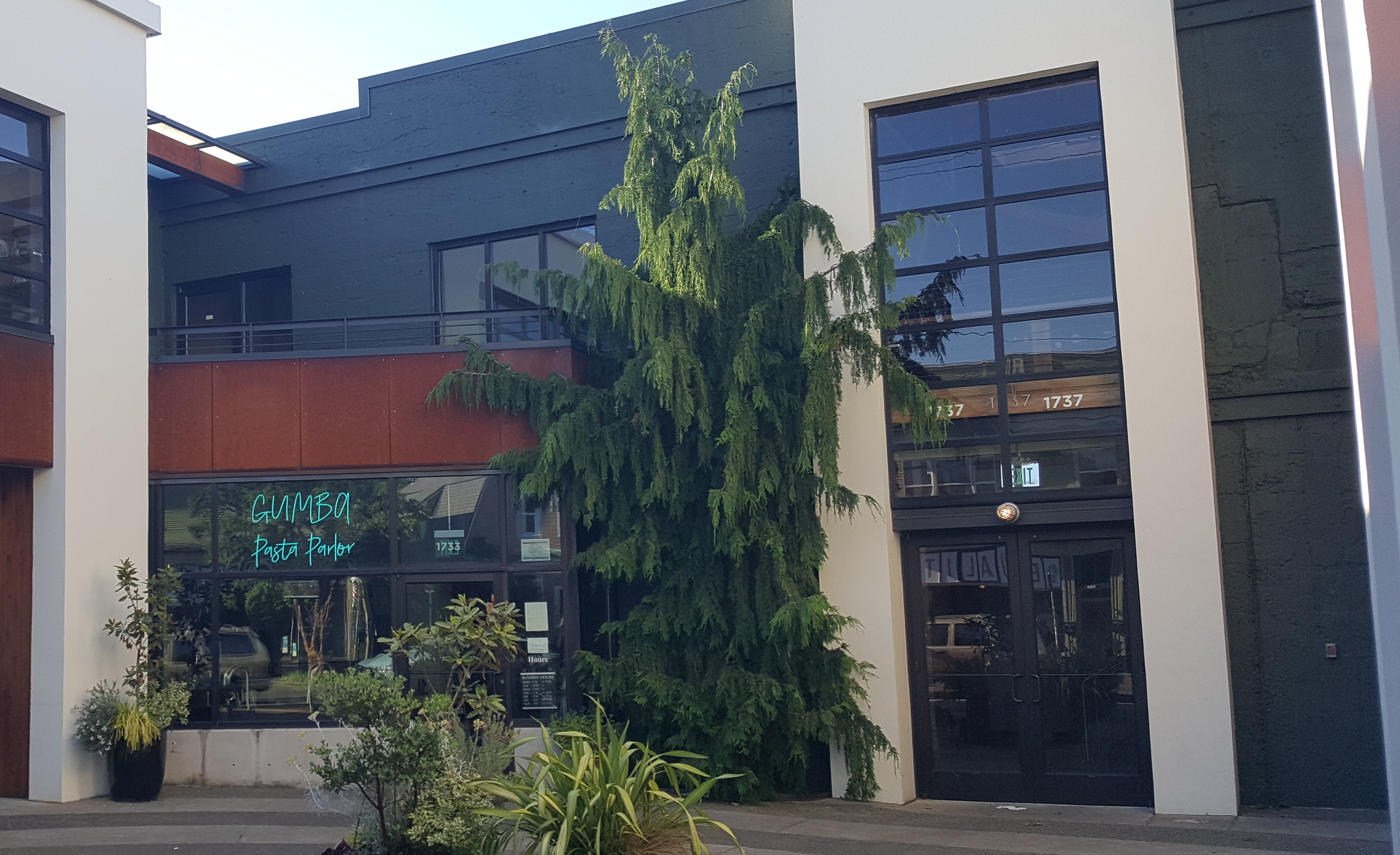
- The restaurant's exterior in 2022
- Interactive map of Gumba

Restaurant information
- Established: 2016
- Owners: Robin Brassaw; Jesse Martinez
- Food type: Italian
- Location: 1733 Northeast Alberta Street, Portland, Multnomah, Oregon, 97211, United States
- Coordinates: 45.5594°N 122.6472°W
- Website: gumba-pdx.com

Gumba Pasta Parlor, or simply Gumba, is an Italian restaurant in Portland, Oregon, United States. Established in 2016, the business initially operated as a food cart.

== Description ==
The Italian restaurant Gumba (pronounced "GOOM-bah") operates in northeast Portland's Vernon neighborhood. Originally a food cart, the business now operates as a brick and mortar restaurant with an "airy, floral-but-industrial" dining room, according to Eater Portland.

The menu includes pastas with ingredients such as burrata, egg yolk, lemon, shallots, and sumac, as well as calamari with marinated chickpeas and pappardelle with braised beef short rib. The restaurant has also served burrata with black pepper, fry bread, and olive oil, as well as cannolis and eggplant caramel olive oil cake. The squid ink spaghettini has Manila clams, mussels, scallops, and cheese frico.

== History ==
Robin Brassaw and Jesse Martinez are the owners. The duo started the business as a food cart in 2016 and relocated to a pod called The Whale in August 2017. Gumba became a brick and mortar establishment in 2020, operating in the space that previously housed Aviary.

== Reception ==
Brooke Jackson-Glidden included Gumba in Eater Portland's 2017 list of seventeen "date-worthy" restaurants open on Mondays. She also included the business in a 2022 overview of restaurants with the best burrata in the metropolitan area. The website's Janey Wong included the squid ink spaghettini in a 2024 overview of the city's best pasta dishes. Gumba was also included in Eater Portland's 2025 overview of the city's best Italian restaurants. Katherine Chew Hamilton included the business in the website's 2025 overview of recommended restaurants on Alberta Street. Gumba ranked number 98 on Yelp's "Top 100 Places to Eat" list in 2023.

== See also ==
- List of Italian restaurants
