= Off the Griddle =

Restaurant in Portland, Oregon, U.S.

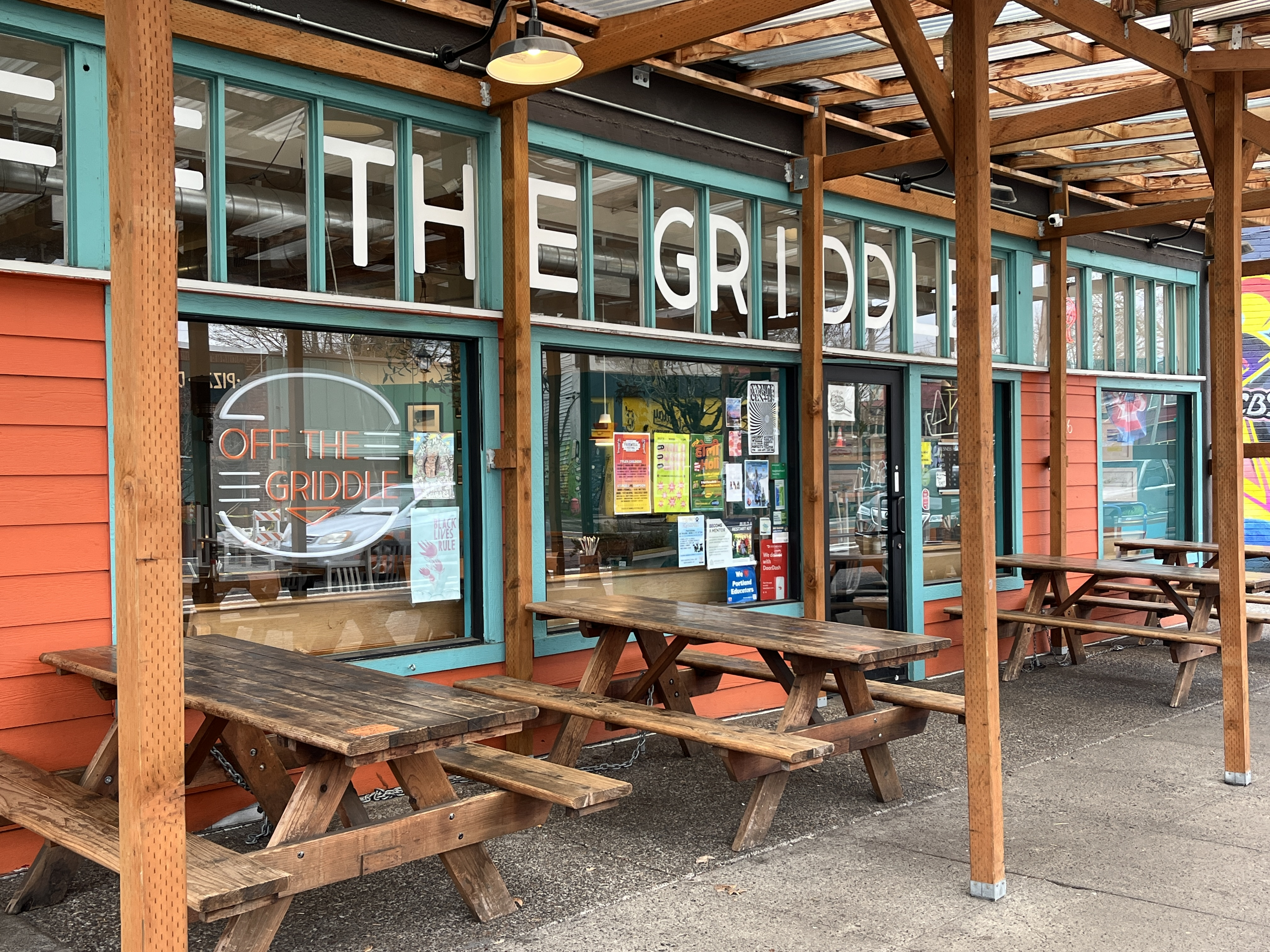
- The restaurant's exterior in 2025
- Interactive map of Off the Griddle

Restaurant information
- Established: 2010
- Owners: Ashley Arthur; Dan Harding
- Food type: Vegan; vegetarian
- Location: 6526 Southeast Foster Road, Portland, Multnomah, Oregon, 97206, United States
- Coordinates: 45.4888°N 122.5953°W
- Seating capacity: 54
- Website: offthegriddle.com

Off the Griddle is a restaurant in Portland, Oregon. Owned by Ashley Arthur and Dan Harding, the business started as a food cart in 2010 before becoming a brick and mortar restaurant in southeast Portland's Mt. Scott-Arleta neighborhood in 2017. The menu includes vegan and vegetarian burgers, as well as breakfast options, salads, sandwiches, and cocktails.

== Description ==
The vegetarian diner Off the Griddle operates on Foster Road at 65th in southeast Portland's Mt. Scott-Arleta neighborhood, near Foster-Powell. The 1,480-square-foot space has a seating capacity of approximately 54 people. According to Eater Portland, the interior has a "funky atmosphere of the late '80s and early '90s", a color scheme inspired by Saved by the Bell, a large wristwatch, a bowling lane as a bartop, a fake fireplace, and reclaimed church pews for seating. Portland Monthly said the restaurant has "fun, retro vibes" and a hamburger piñata.

=== Menu ===
The menu has included vegan and vegetarian burgers, as well as French fries. Burger varieties include a jalapeño cheeseburger and the Smoky Bleu, which has been described as a barbecue-tempeh-bacon-and-blue-"cheese" burger. Patties are made from leeks, mushrooms, and wild brown rice, among other ingredients. Off the Griddle has also served salads, sandwiches, and macaroni and cheese bowls.

The restaurant also serves brunch; among breakfast options is biscuits and gravy, a breakfast burrito, jackfruit brisket hash, a "brunch wrap supreme", walnut meatloaf Benedict, and the Blue Plate, which has house-made sausage, hash browns, a biscuit with gravy, and either eggs or a scramble with tofu and herbs. Waffle options include the plant-based fried "chk'n" and waffles, pumpkin with sweet cream, and blue corn with fruit.

Among 1990s-themed cocktails is the Cinnamon Toast, which has cinnamon whisky, root beer, and coconut-vanilla ice cream. Bloody Mary varieties include Spicy (jalapeño), Gazpacho (cucumber, pepper, and garlic), and Bangkok (Thai basil and ginger). The drink menu also includes Arnold Palmers and "kimosas" (half kombucha and half juice).

== History ==
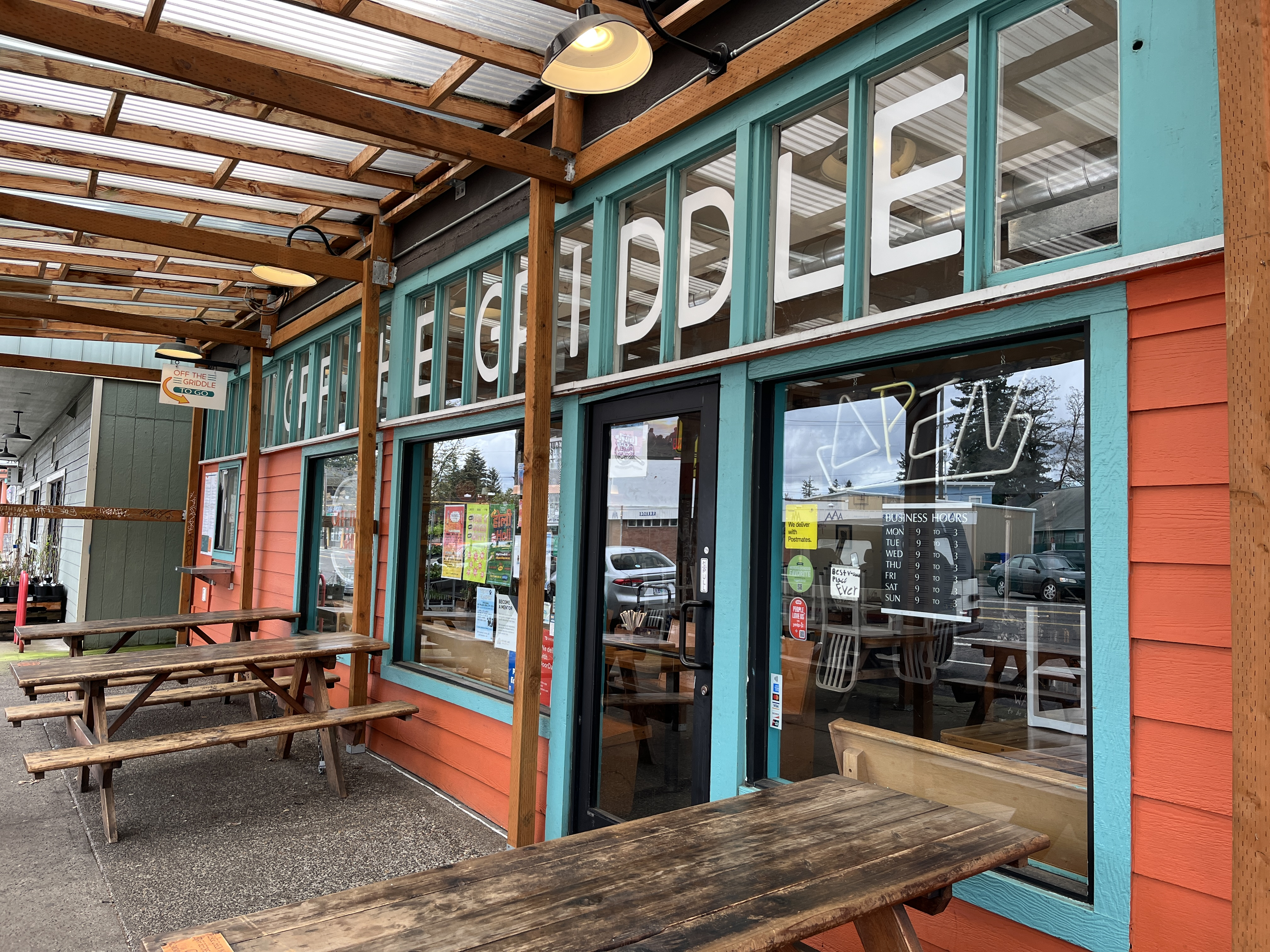
The restaurant's exterior, 2025

Off the Griddle started as a solar-powered food cart at the intersection of 50th and Division in 2010, before moving into a brick and mortar space previously occupied by music bar Gemini in 2017. The business is owned by Ashley Arthur and Dan Harding, and has shared a space with A.N.D Cafe.

== Reception ==
Carrie Uffindell included Off the Griddle in Eater Portland's 2017 overview of the city's "most worthy" waffles. The website's Waz Wu included the business in a 2021 overview of the city's "hottest spots for vegan brunch right now", and Nathan Williams and Janey Wong included Off the Griddle in a 2023 overview of recommended eateries in Foster-Powell. The restaurant has been included in The Oregonian's "ultimate guide to Portland's 40 best brunches". VegOut recommends the restaurant for "classic comfort food with a vegan twist". Off the Griddle ranked second in the Best Vegan-Friendly Restaurant category of VegNews' 2023 overview of the best vegan establishments in the United States. The business was included in a Yelp list of Portland's ten best vegan eateries in 2025.

== See also ==
- List of diners
- List of vegetarian and vegan restaurants
