= Paladin Pie =

Restaurant in Portland, Oregon, U.S.

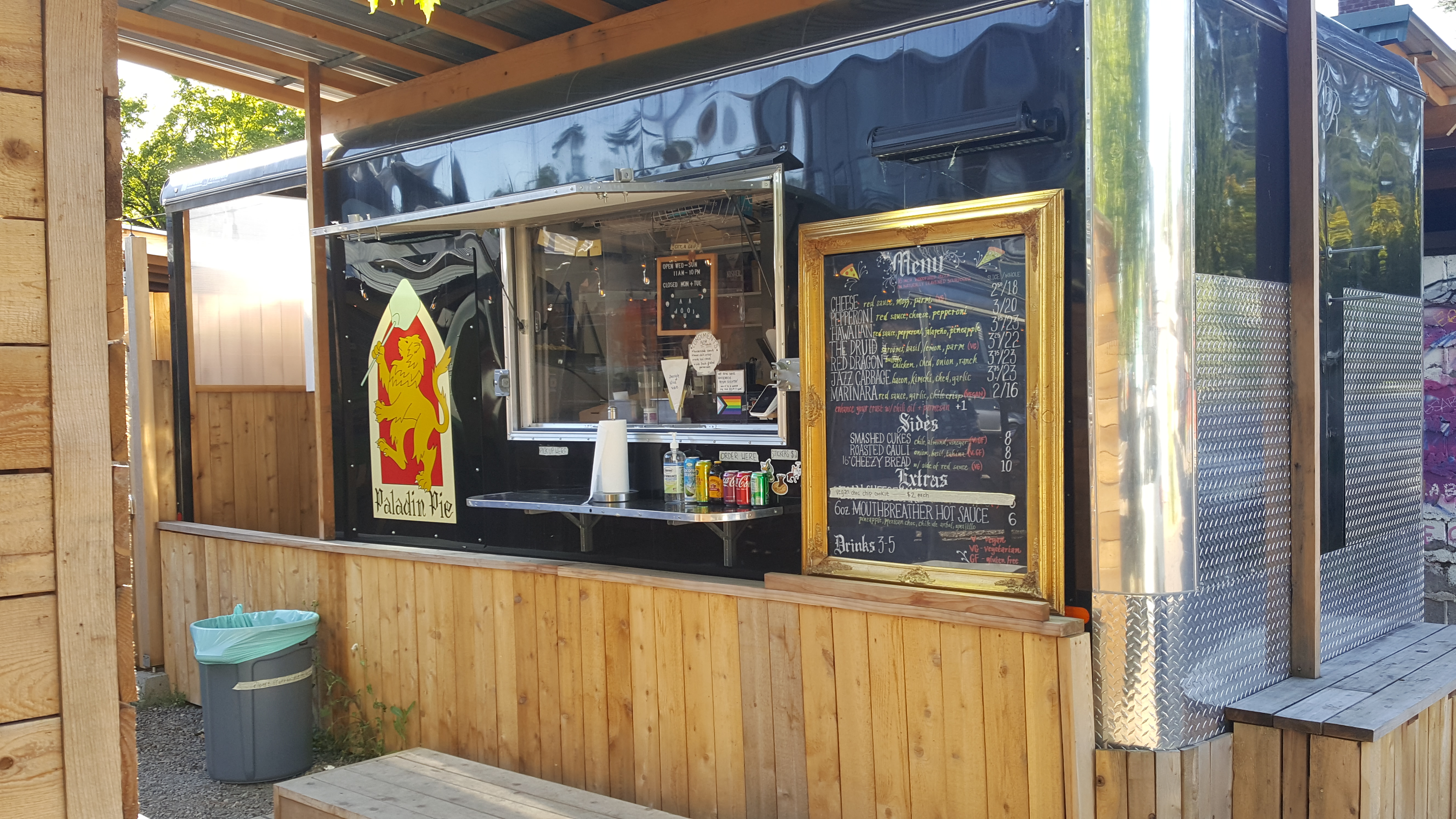
- The food cart in 2022
- Interactive map of Paladin Pie

Restaurant information
- Owner: Leo Brill
- Food type: Italian (pizza)
- Location: 1027 Northeast Alberta Street, Portland, Multnomah, Oregon, 97211, United States
- Coordinates: 45.5592°N 122.6548°W
- Website: paladinpie.com

Paladin Pie is a Dungeons & Dragons-themed pizzeria in Portland, Oregon, in the United States. Owner Leo Brill started the business as a pop-up restaurant in 2020, before operating from a food cart on Alberta Street starting in 2022.

== Description ==
Paladin Pie is a Dungeons & Dragons-themed pizzeria in northeast Portland's Concordia neighborhood. Pizza varieties include the Druid (roasted mushrooms, Parmesan cream, mozzarella, basil, and lemon), the Jazz Cabbage (mozzarella, cheddar, bacon, and kimchi), and the Red Dragon (Buffalo chicken with Frank's, chicken, red onion, and house ranch).

== History ==
Owner Leo Brill, a former pizza chef at Oven and Shaker, started the business as a backyard pop-up restaurant in the summer of 2020. In January 2022, Bill announced plans to operate the business from a food cart on Alberta Street in northeast Portland. The cart opened on March 4, 2022.

Brill has donated business proceeds to various nonprofit organizations and other groups, including Don't Shoot PDX, For The Gworls, Minnesota Freedom Fund, the National Black Justice Coalition, and The Okra Project. Flynn McEchron is a business partner. For Pizza Week in 2024, Paladin Pie served the special Questing Taco pizza, which had vegetarian chili, cheddar, mozzarella, jalapeño crema, scallion, and Fritos.

Paladin Pie's "sibling" restaurant Oathbreaker Pie opened in the Hinterland Bar and Food Carts in November 2024.

== Reception ==
Brooke Jackson-Glidden included Paladin Pie in Eater Portland's 2022 overview of "where to eat and drink" on Alberta, as well as a list of Portland's "hottest" new restaurants and food carts, in which she called the Jazz Cabbage a "particular standout". Jackson-Glidden also included the business in a 2023 overview of "exceptional" pizzas in the Portland metropolitan area. Paladin Pie was a runner-up in the Best Food Cart category of Willamette Week's annual 'Best of Portland' readers' poll in 2024. The business was named the Portland metropolitan area's second best pizza restaurant in The Oregonian's Readers Choice Awards in 2026.

== See also ==
- Pizza in Portland, Oregon
