= Ruthie's =

Restaurant in Portland, Oregon, U.S.

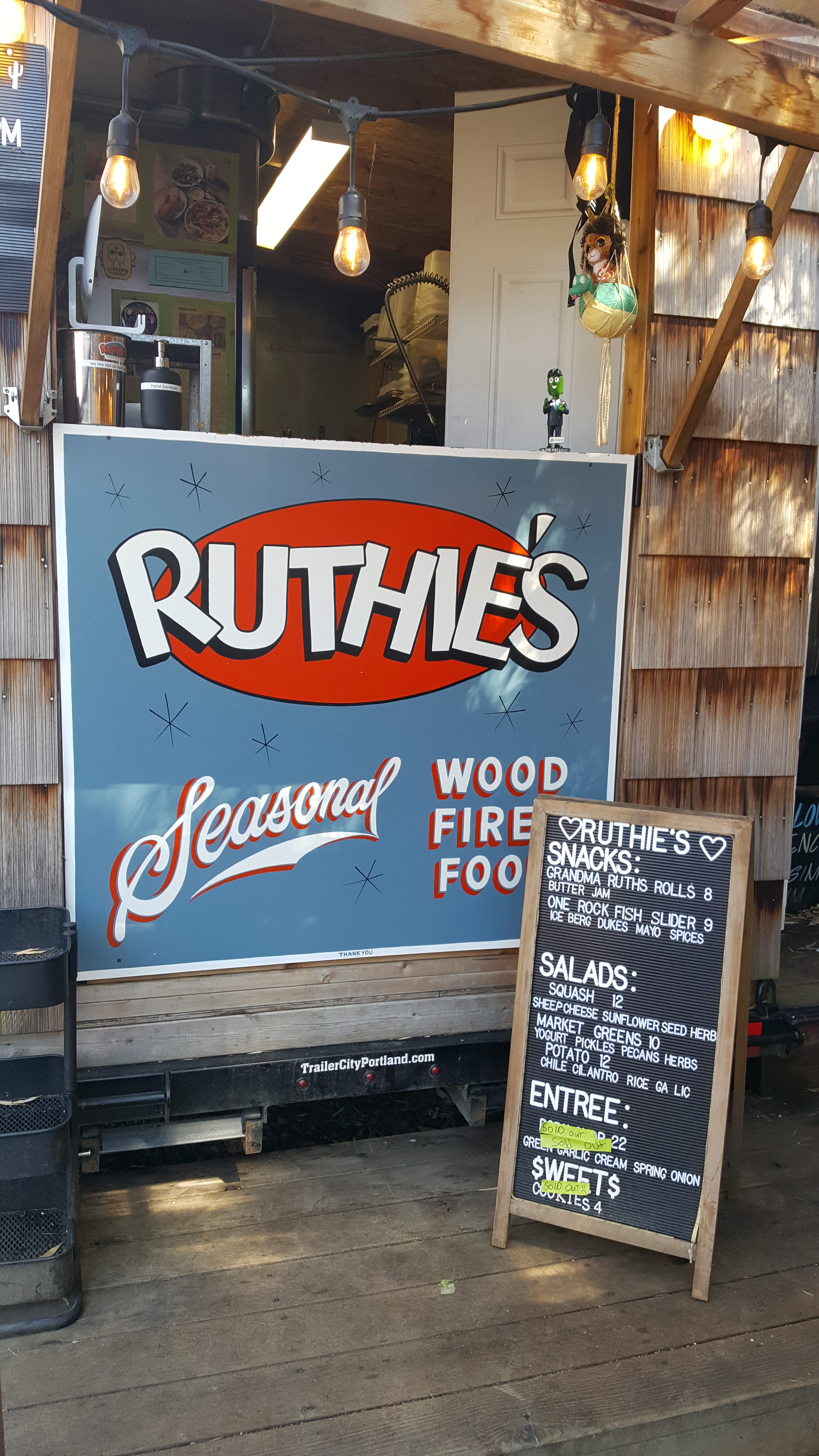
- The food cart in 2022
- Interactive map of Ruthie's

Restaurant information
- Location: 3634 Southeast Division Street, Portland, Multnomah, Oregon, 97202, United States
- Coordinates: 45.5046°N 122.6257°W

Ruthie's is a restaurant in Portland, Oregon, United States.

== Description and history ==
Ruthie's operates from a food cart at the intersection of 36th Avenue and Division Street in southeast Portland's Richmond neighborhood. The menu, described by Eater Portland as a "modern spin on Mormon food", has included funeral potatoes, Jell-O, rockfish sliders, a pork roll, a salad with corn, sheep cheese, popped sorghum, and tomato, as well as biscuits, jams, pickles, and desserts. For Valentine's Day, Ruthie's has served shokupan with dino nuggets, ranch powder, and caviar.

== History ==
Collin Mohr and Aaron Kiss opened Ruthie's in October 2020. Named after Mohr's Mormon grandmother, the restaurant has sourced food from the local farms Farrah Farms, Vibrant Valley, and Wild Roots. In 2022, Ruthie's was featured episodes of the Netflix travel documentary series Somebody Feed Phil as well as Street Food.

== Reception ==
Katherine Chew Hamilton included Ruthie's in Portland Monthly's 2021 list of "Portland’s Best New Food Carts" and 2022 list of "20 Food Carts that Define Portland Now". Ruthie's was included in Eater Portland's 2025 overview of the city's best food carts.

== See also ==
- Cuisine of the Western United States
- Culture of The Church of Jesus Christ of Latter-day Saints
- Food carts in Portland, Oregon
- Mormon foodways
