= DC Vegetarian =

Restaurant in Portland, Oregon, U.S.

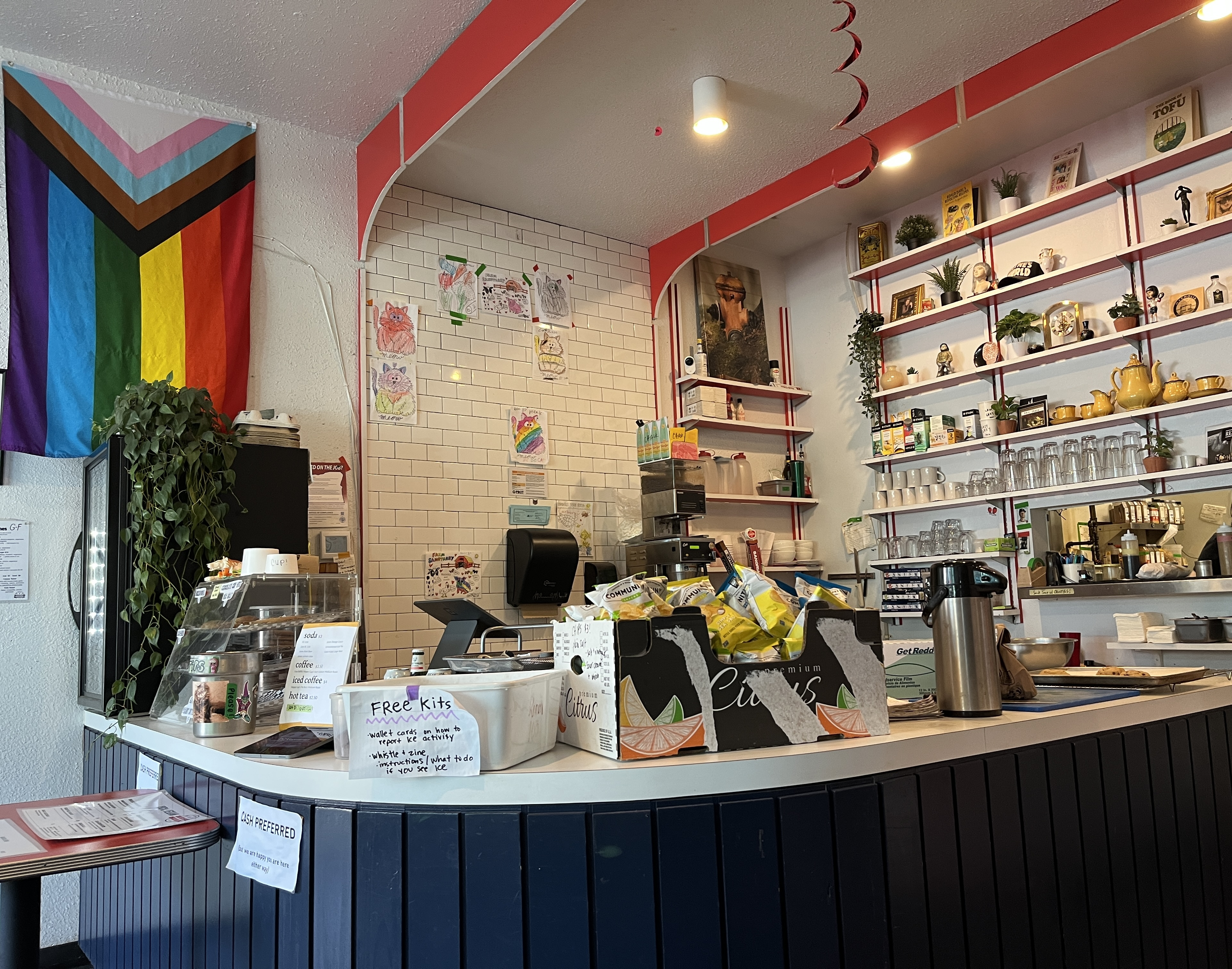
- The restaurant's interior, 2026
- Interactive map of DC Vegetarian

Restaurant information
- Established: 2009
- Owners: Damien Gill; Becky Leonard
- Food type: American
- Location: 5026 Southeast Division Street, Portland, Multnomah, Oregon, 97206, United States
- Coordinates: 45.5051°N 122.6106°W
- Website: dcvegordering.com

DC Vegetarian is a vegetarian and vegan restaurant in Portland, Oregon, United States. Owners Damien Gill and Becky Leonard started the business as a food cart in 2009, before relocating to a brick and mortar location in southeast Portland in 2018. DC Vegetarian serves American cuisine including various burgers and sandwiches.

== Description ==
DC Vegetarian is a vegetarian and vegan restaurant in Portland, Oregon. The business originally operated as a food cart, before relocating to a diner-style brick and mortar location near the intersection of 50th and Division Street in southeast Portland's Richmond neighborhood. The interior has books, plants, and rustic benches.

The fast casual restaurant serves American cuisine such as burgers and sandwiches, including breakfast sandwiches, a grilled cheese, and meatless variants of BLTs, cheesesteaks, and Italian subs. The Chicken Salad Sub has soy curls. The Steak and Cheese has seitan, sautéed peppers, onions and vegan cheese. Vegetarian options can be made vegan. The Carl's Senior is a gluten-free option. Dessert options include peanut butter cups. The drink menu includes cocktails.

== History ==
Owners and spouses Damien Gill and Becky Leonard started the business as a food cart in 2009. DC Vegetarian operated in the food cart pod on Southwest Third Avenue between Stark and Washington in 2011. In 2017, news outlets described DC Vegetarian's plans to open a brick and mortar restaurant later in the year, in the space that previously housed Mi Mero Mole. The restaurant opened on February 16, 2018. The food cart closed in March 2018. Like many restaurants, the business operated via delivery and take-out at times during the COVID-19 pandemic.

DC Vegetarian has hosted pop-up restaurants, including Tender Texan in 2020.

== Reception ==
Alexandra Chang included the Chicken Salad Sub in VegNews's 2011 list of the seven best vegan sandwiches. Eric Lindstrom included the restaurant in the magazine's 2017 list of twelve diners "where it's always National Greasy Food Day for vegans". In 2012, People for the Ethical Treatment of Animals ranked DC Vegetarian first in a list of the nation's top ten vegan BLTs, saying it has "all the deliciousness with none of the cruelty that pork sandwiches do". Additionally, The Oregonian ranked the Steak and Cheese Sub seventh in a list of Portland's top ten vegan dishes.

Michelle Udem included the business in Thrillist's 2015 list of Portland's best vegetarian restaurants. In 2016, Yelp included DC Vegetarian in a list of Portland's top 40 food carts. Nick Zukin gave the restaurant honorable mention in Willamette Week's 2019 overview of the city's best vegan burgers. Jordan Michelman included the BLT in the newspaper's 2019 list of Portland's best vegan dishes. Willamette Week also called DC Vegetarian "a food cart staple for alt-diet PSU students" in 2019. Anastasia Sloan included DC Vegetarian in Eater Portland's 2025 list of the city's best vegetarian and vegan burgers.

== See also ==
- List of vegetarian and vegan restaurants
