= The Grilled Cheese Grill =

Restaurant in Portland, Oregon, U.S.

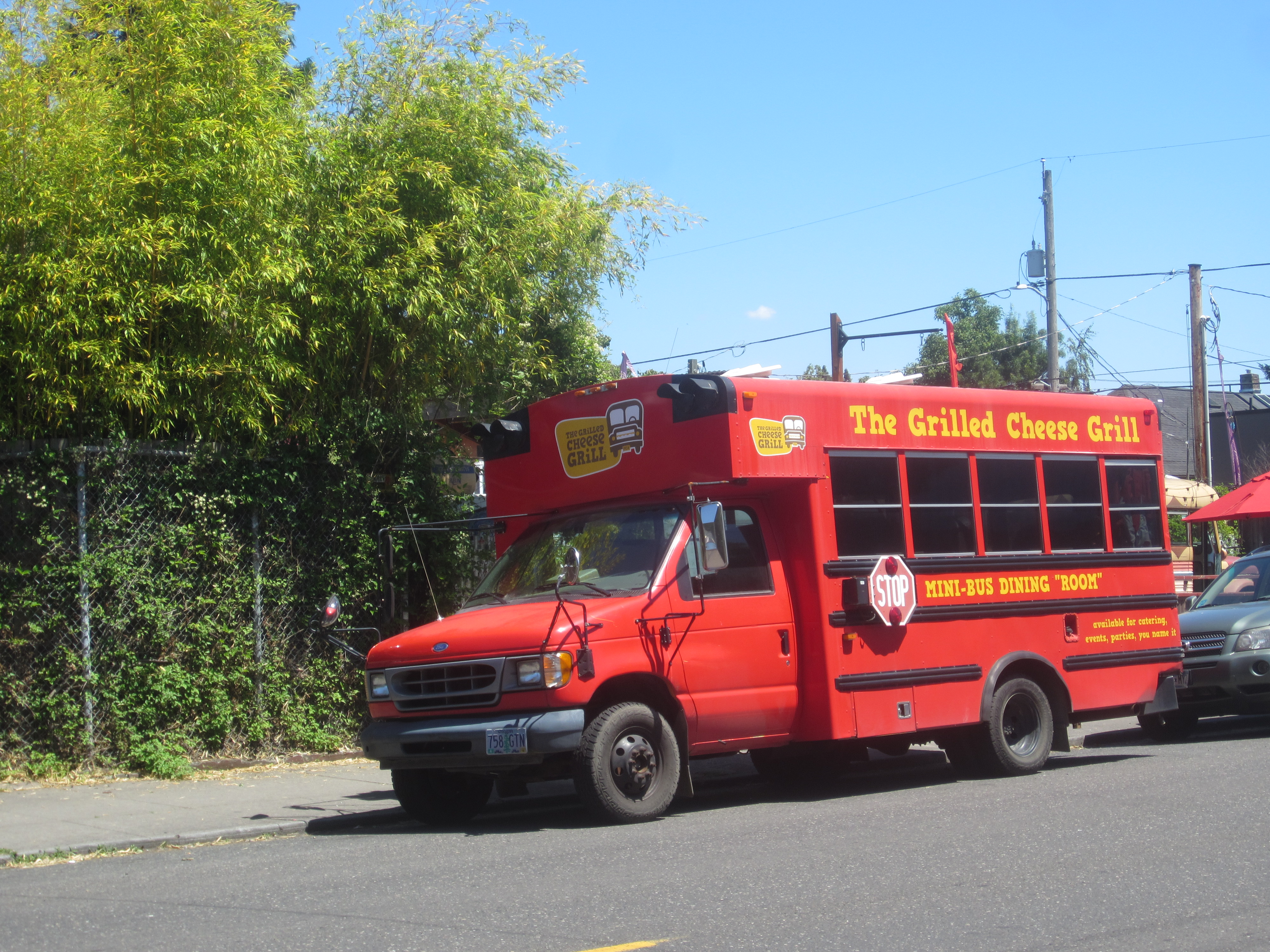
- Food truck in northeast Portland in 2019

Restaurant information
- Established: April 20, 2009; 17 years ago
- Owner: Matthew "Matt" Breslow
- Food type: Comfort food
- Dress code: None
- Rating: Zagat: 25/30
- Location: 2315 NE Alberta St., Portland, Multnomah, Oregon, United States
- Reservations: Not taken
- Website: grilledcheesegrill.com

The Grilled Cheese Grill is a restaurant focusing on gourmet grilled cheese sandwiches in Portland, Oregon, United States. Established in 2009, the restaurant became known for its highly successful food carts. The owners announced they would not reopen in March 2021 after being closed since the start of the COVID-19 pandemic in March of the previous year. In July 2022, the restaurant re-opened in a brick and mortar location.

== History ==
Matthew "Matt" Breslow is originally from New Jersey and New York. His family went on holiday to Portland as a child since he had uncles, aunts and cousins residing in the city. In 2007, he moved to Portland, and on April 20, 2009, opened the first GCG location on Alberta Street.

== Locations ==
The GCG has used unconventional locations for its restaurants. One location, which was located on Alberta Street in Portland, was an airstream-school bus combination. The kitchen was in the renovated airstream, while the old school bus had been converted to be a stationary place for patrons to eat. The tables were plastered with school photos "taken at the height of dorkdom". Outside of the bus were picnic tables people could eat on as well.

In Southeast Portland the GCG restaurant was inside a double decker bus, and the downtown location was a stationary food cart. The double decker bus was a 1954 former Mount St. Helens tour bus that Breslow painted on the sides of to resemble a large checkerboard.

In July 2022, the restaurant reopened inside the kitchen of the cocktail bar The Knock Back, which is also reopening, in the Alberta neighborhood of East Portland.

== Impact ==
While operating out of food carts before the pandemic closure, GCG had become an example of "highly successful" food carts. Lonely Planet considered the GCG to be one of the top food carts of Portland. In 2009, the GCG won the People's Choice trophy at the Eat Mobile, Willamette Week's annual food cart contest.

Rachael Ray recommended the GCG in her magazine Every Day with Rachael Ray. Reader's Digest also called the GCG "the best grilled cheese in Portland." The Zagat guide reviewed the restaurants, with each category out of a possible 30 points: The GCT scored 25 on food, 22 on décor, and 23 on service.

With the success of the three GCG locations, Breslow decided to open another sandwich cart called the Shotgun Sub Shop, located in downtown Portland.

== Menu ==
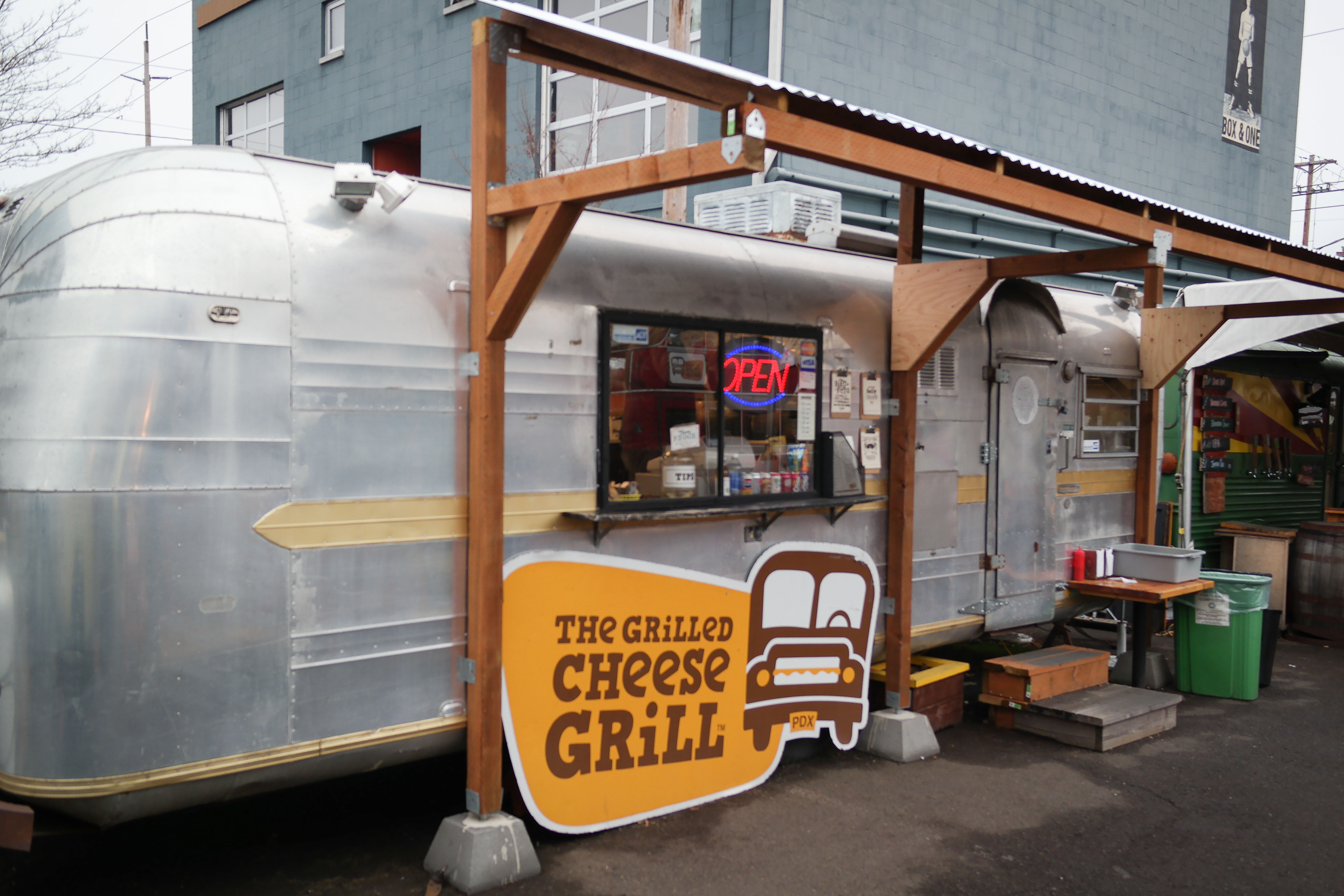
Food cart at Pod 28 in 2013

The GCG offers a variety of toppings not usually found on grilled cheese sandwiches. Some of these toppings include bacon, apples, blue cheese, Swiss cheese, jalapeño, artichoke, turkey, hummus, mascarpone, Nutella, banana, cinnamon, avocado, tomato, sauerkraut, ham, salami, chips, fried eggs and many others. Some original sandwiches included:

- Cheesus: the Cheesus is the signature sandwich of GCG, which has been described as a "grilled cheese cheeseburger". On either side, instead of a traditional hamburger bun, there are two grilled cheese sandwiches. One sandwich consists of pickles and American cheese and the other consists of grilled onions and Colby Jack Cheese. The middle is traditional burger fare: lettuce, tomato, ketchup, mustard and a 1/3 lb burger.
- BABS: the BABS is an acronym for Bacon, Apple, Blue Cheese and Swiss. This sandwich is served on rye bread. Breslow stated, "This sandwich is on our permanent menu at the carts and is a top-seller, for its unique flavor combination of the tart blue cheese, sweet apples, savory bacon and nice mellow Swiss cheese to tie it all together. We serve it at the cart on marble rye bread."
- Jalapeño Popper: The Jalapeño Popper has roasted jalapeños, Colby jack cheese, cream cheese, and corn tortilla chips atop sourdough bread. 1859 magazine described the experience as: "The crack of the chips and the spice of the peppers make for a delicious medley of texture and taste... Stick around to eat your sandwich, as a grilled cheese should only be eaten with the cheese nice and melty."

== See also ==
- COVID-19 pandemic in Portland, Oregon
- Impact of the COVID-19 pandemic on the restaurant industry in the United States
