= Tails & Trotters =

Defunct restaurant in Portland, Oregon, U.S.

- Interactive map of Tails & Trotters

Restaurant information
- Location: 525 Northeast 24th Avenue, Portland, Oregon, 97232, United States
- Coordinates: 45°31′37.1″N 122°38′29.7″W

Tails & Trotters was a Portland, Oregon-based pork company that operated a butcher shop in the northeast Portland part of the Kerns neighborhood until 2022. The shop was featured on Diners, Drive-Ins, and Dives.

== Description ==
The butcher shop was located in the northeast Portland part of the Kerns neighborhood. It sold various sandwiches, paninis, and kebabs, as well as meat products such as bacon, brisket, cutlets, ribs, and sausage.

== History ==
Tails & Trotters was established in 2007, and began operating from a farmers' market booth in 2009. The business opened a "micro-restaurant" in late 2012.

In 2017, the shop was damaged by an electrical fire. Owners Aaron and Kelly Silverman announced plans to close in 2022 because of rising business costs and challenges caused by the COVID-19 pandemic.

== Reception ==
Tails & Trotters was featured on Diners, Drive-Ins, and Dives and recognized by the Good Food Awards.

== See also ==
- COVID-19 pandemic in Portland, Oregon
- Impact of the COVID-19 pandemic on the meat industry in the United States
- Impact of the COVID-19 pandemic on the restaurant industry in the United States
