= Mama Chow's Kitchen =

Chinese restaurant in Portland, Oregon, U.S.

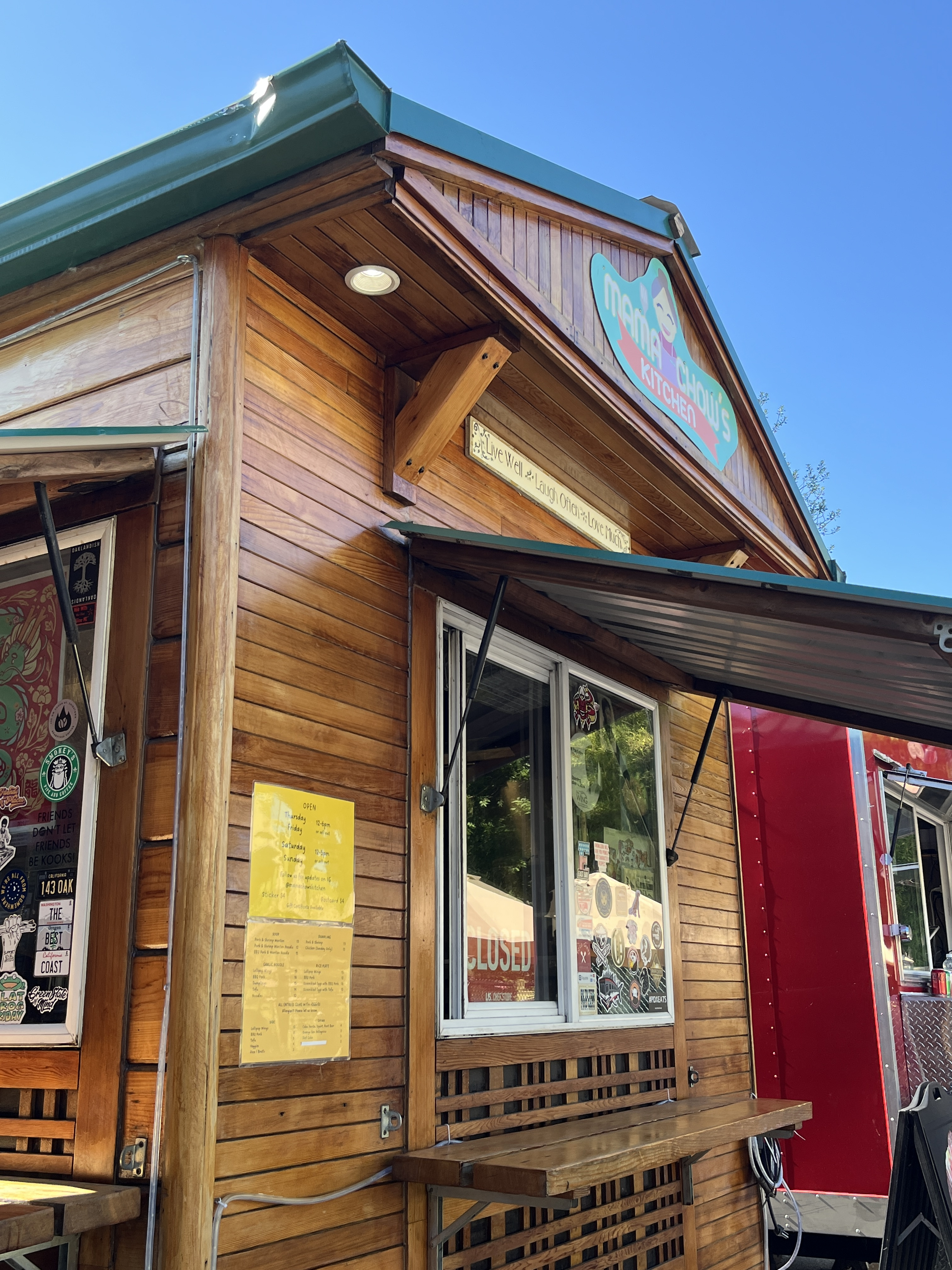
- The food cart in 2025
- Interactive map of Mama Chow's Kitchen

Restaurant information
- Established: 2014
- Owner: Jeff Chow
- Chef: Jeff Chow
- Food type: Chinese
- Location: 3757 Southeast Hawthorne Boulevard, Portland, Multnomah, Oregon, 97214, United States
- Coordinates: 45°30′44″N 122°37′29″W

Mama Chow's Kitchen is a Chinese restaurant in Portland, Oregon, United States. Chef and owner Jeff Chow started the business in 2014, operating in downtown Portland for nearly a decade before relocating to southeast Portland's Richmond neighborhood in 2023.

Mama Chow's Kitchen has garnered a positive reception. It was named one of the city's best new foods carts by The Oregonian, was selected for Oregon in The Daily Meal's 2021 list of the best Chinese restaurants in each U.S. state, and ranked sixth in Yelp's list of the top 100 Chinese eateries in the nation in 2024.

== Description ==
The Chinese restaurant Mama Chow's Kitchen operates from a food cart in Portland, Oregon. The business originally operated in downtown Portland, before relocating to the food cart pod called Farmhouse Carts on Division Street in southeast Portland's Richmond neighborhood.

The menu includes dumplings, wonton noodle soup, as well as lollipop chicken wings marinated in garlic, honey, soy, and vinegar, and served with yakisoba noodles or rice. The restaurant also serves char siu and garlic noodles.

== History ==
Jeff Chow is the chef and owner. He started the restaurant in 2014 and was inspired to name the business after his mother, who worked at a Chinese restaurant in Oakland, California. Chow announced plans to move the business from downtown Portland to the Richmond neighborhood in 2022. The move was completed in 2023. In 2024, the restaurant closed temporarily after Chow was injured while hiking at Wahclella Falls in the Columbia River Gorge.

Mama Chow's has participated in The Oregonian's annual Dumpling Week several times, including in 2019 and since 2022. In 2022, the restaurant served Mom's Pork & Shrimp Wonton Soup with cilantro, garlic chives, and scallions. It served sui gow-style dumplings with bamboo shoots, carrots, mushrooms, pork, shrimp, and water chestnuts, served with a chili oil black vinegar dipping sauce in 2023, and Chicken Wonton Soup, which had chicken, caramelized shiitakes, and yellow onion wontons served with bok choy and garlic chive in a bonito brown butter bone broth, in 2024.

Mama Chow's is slated to begin operating as one of five food carts in the pod on Hawthorne Boulevard in southeast Portland's Sunnyside neighborhood in February 2025. The site is part of the Steeplejack Brewing Company outpost, which operates in a former bank building and also houses a coffee shop by Harder Day.

== Reception ==
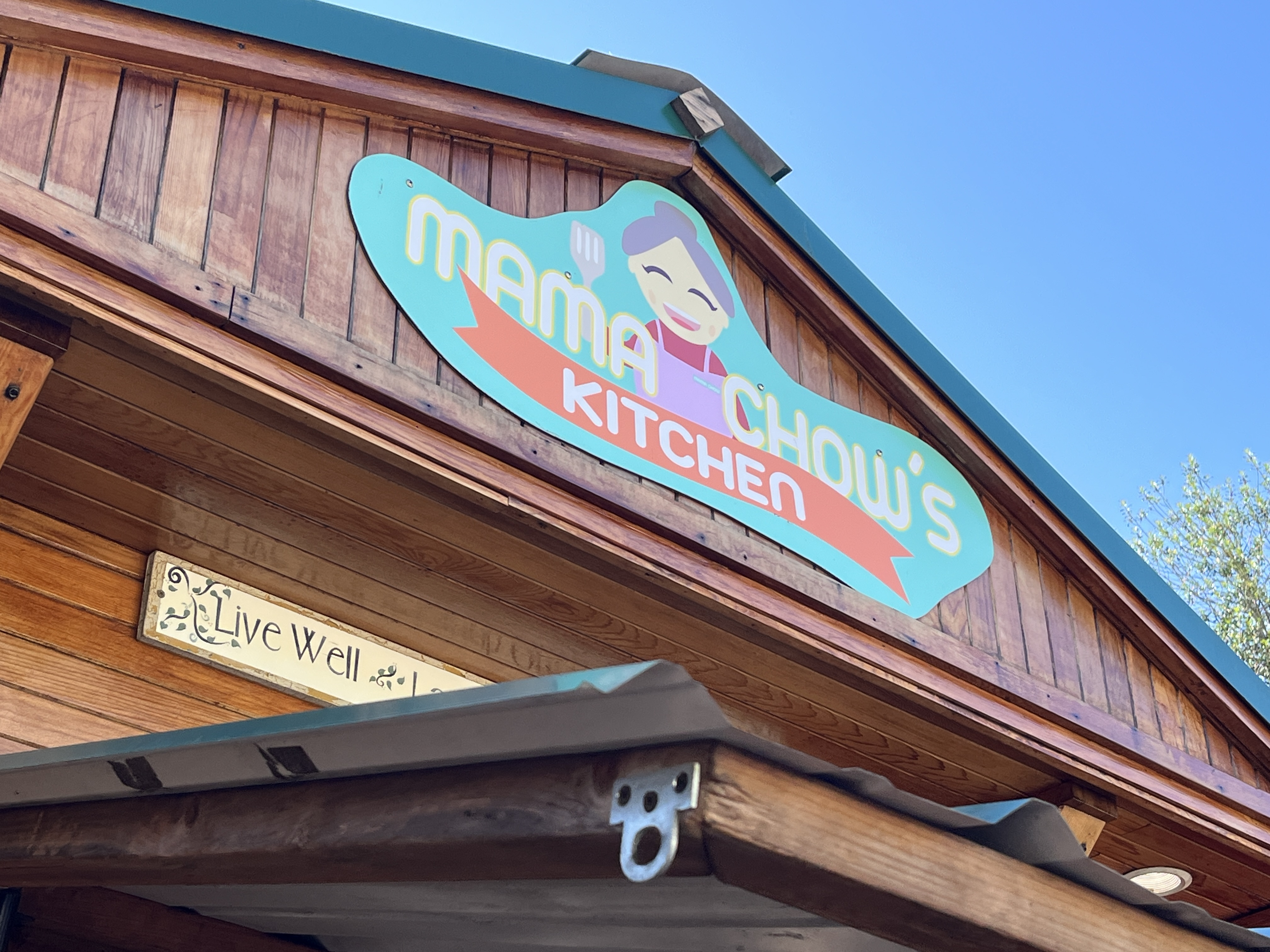
The food cart in 2025

Mama Chow's was named one of Portland's best new food carts by The Oregonian in 2014. The newspaper's Michael Russell also included the business in a 2016 overview of the city's best fried chicken wings. In a positive 2014 review of the restaurant, Andrea Damewood of the Portland Mercury wrote, "Mama Chow's is one of those gems that you can tell is going to make it, good press or not." In 2024, she wrote, "Back then, people complained about a lack of good Chinese food in Portland. That wasn't true then and it’s especially not true now, thanks to places like Mama Chow's." Katherine Chew Hamilton included the business in the newspaper's 2026 list of the city's top twenty food carts.

In 2021, The Daily Meal selected Mama Chow's for Oregon in a list of the best Chinese restaurants in each U.S. state. Brooke Jackson-Glidden and Krista Garcia included Mama Chow's in Eater Portland's overview of the metropolitan area's best chicken wings. Mama Chow's ranked number six in Yelp's list of the top 100 Chinese restaurants in the United States in 2024. Covering the list, Food & Wine said, "The secret to Mama Chow's success is, in some ways, its simplicity; dishes with only a few ingredients are elevated by an attention to detail rather than an excess of culinary flourishes." Parade said, "This food truck uses a lot of garlic and love to make their food, and it shows. Yelpers say the 'Food is unbelievably good. Love the garlic noodles with the dumplings.' Unfortunately, you can't go here for Christmas because the truck is shut down until January, but when it reopens, it's a must-stop!" Mama Chow's ranked number 72 in Yelp's 2025 list of the 100 best food trucks in the U.S., based on reviews.

== See also ==
- History of Chinese Americans in Portland, Oregon
- List of Chinese restaurants
