= Fifty Licks =

Ice cream parlor based in Portland, Oregon, U.S.

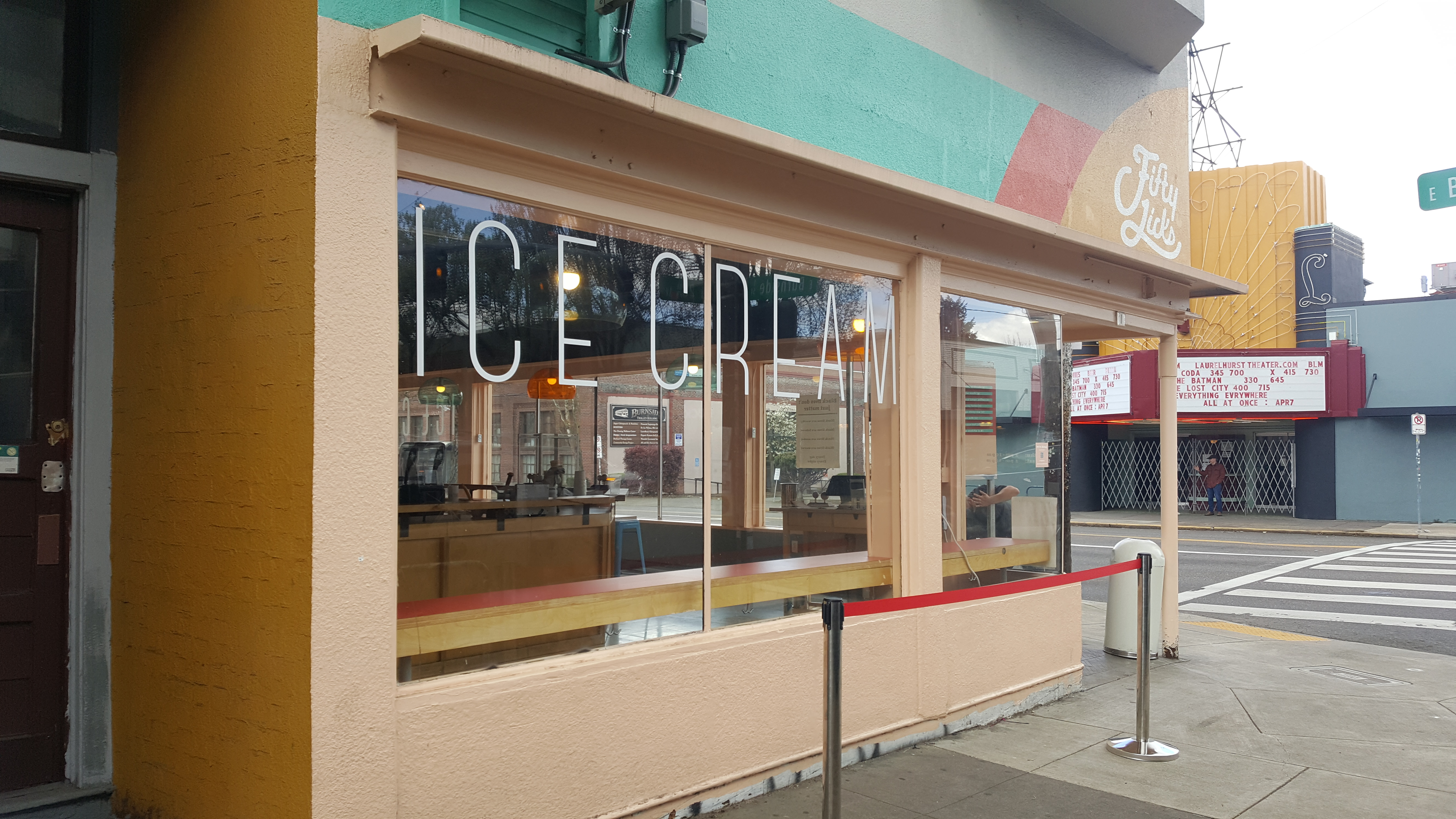
- Exterior of Fifty Licks on East Burnside Street (with Laurelhurst Theater in the background), Portland, Oregon, 2022

Restaurant information
- Established: 2009; 17 years ago
- Owner: Chad Draizin
- Food type: Ice cream
- Website: www.fifty-licks.com

Fifty Licks is an ice cream parlor with several locations in Portland, Oregon.

== History ==
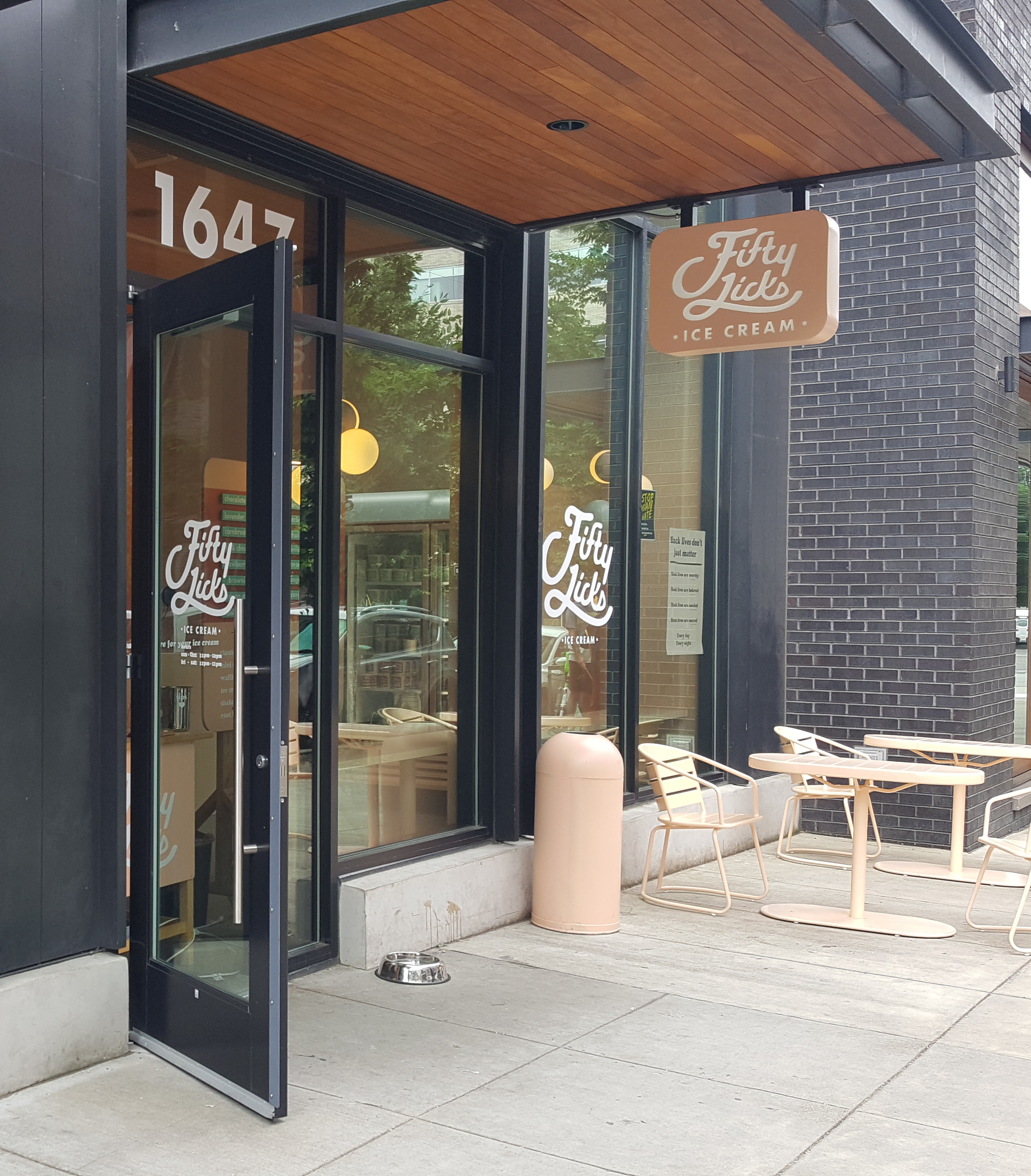
Exterior of a shop in northwest Portland's Northwest District, 2022

Owner Chad Draizin had graduated from NSU University School and studied beer brewing at the University of Florida before an internship at Portland Brewing. After realizing brewing beer on an industrial level was not for him, he began Fifty Licks as an ice cream truck in 2009. That ice cream truck, which operates only during the summer, was named one of Portland's "best new food carts" in 2011 by The Oregonian. "Fifty Licks" is an estimate of the number of licks required to eat one scoop.

In 2013, Draizin opened the first brick and mortar location in the Hosford-Abernethy neighborhood, and Vox Media's Eater selected Fifty Licks as seventh on a list of "16 worthy ice cream candidates that opened across the country over the past year or so" to be included on its "Eater National Ice Cream Heatmap".

The second location opened on East Burnside Street in the Buckman neighborhood in 2017, which led to increased popularity for the company. Fifty Licks offers approximately eleven flavors daily as well as two soft serve flavors and offers ice cream cocktails. The ice cream parlor also makes an effort to provide non-dairy and vegan options, and hopes to eventually feature fifty-percent dairy-free products.

In 2018, Akron Beacon Journal reporter Katie Byard wrote about "some feasting in Portland, Ore., considered one of the country’s best food cities..." and "... an ice cream place dubbed Fifty Licks. Specializing in nontraditional flavors, it touts that it makes its base for its ice creams in house... a friend bought some 'Chocolate as #$%&' with housemade ganache for us to try. The name works... "

During the 2018, Occupy ICE protests, the Fifty Licks food truck distributed free ice cream to protestors. In 2020, Fifty Licks opened its third location in the Slabtown district of the Northwest District neighborhood. Later that year, following the George Floyd protests, one of the shops was briefly targeted by a rioter who tore down a Black Lives Matter poster displayed in the shop's window.

An Associated Press article reported that Fifty Licks was featured in the Hulu television series Shrill. Peter Cottell of Thrillist said Fifty Licks is "beloved for simple, elegant flavors in no-nonsense spaces."

== Locations ==
- Food cart at Northwest 24th Avenue and Thurman Street, Northwest District
- Hosford-Abernethy neighborhood (opened 2013)
- Buckman neighborhood (opened 2017)
- Slabtown district of the Northwest District neighborhood (opened 2020)
- Fifty Licks is also a vendor at the Moda Center

== Reception ==
Fifty Licks ranked third in the Best Ice Cream category of Willamette Week's 'Best of Portland' readers' poll in 2017, 2018, and 2020. It ranked second in the same poll in 2022 and 2025. It won in the same category in 2024.

== See also ==
- List of ice cream parlor chains
- List of restaurant chains in the United States
