= Karen Brooks (food critic) =

American food critic and writer

- Occupation: Food critic

Karen Brooks is an American food critic and writer. She has worked for Portland Monthly, The Oregonian, and Willamette Week. She was laid off from The Oregonian in 2010.

Brooks co-wrote The Mighty Gastropolis: Portland (2012) with Gideon Bosker and Teri Gelber. In 2017, she received the James Beard Foundation's Craig Claiborne Distinguished Restaurant Review Award. She has appeared in the television series Eater's Guide to the World and Street Food: USA.
