= Food cart =

Mobile kitchen set up on the street to prepare and sell street food

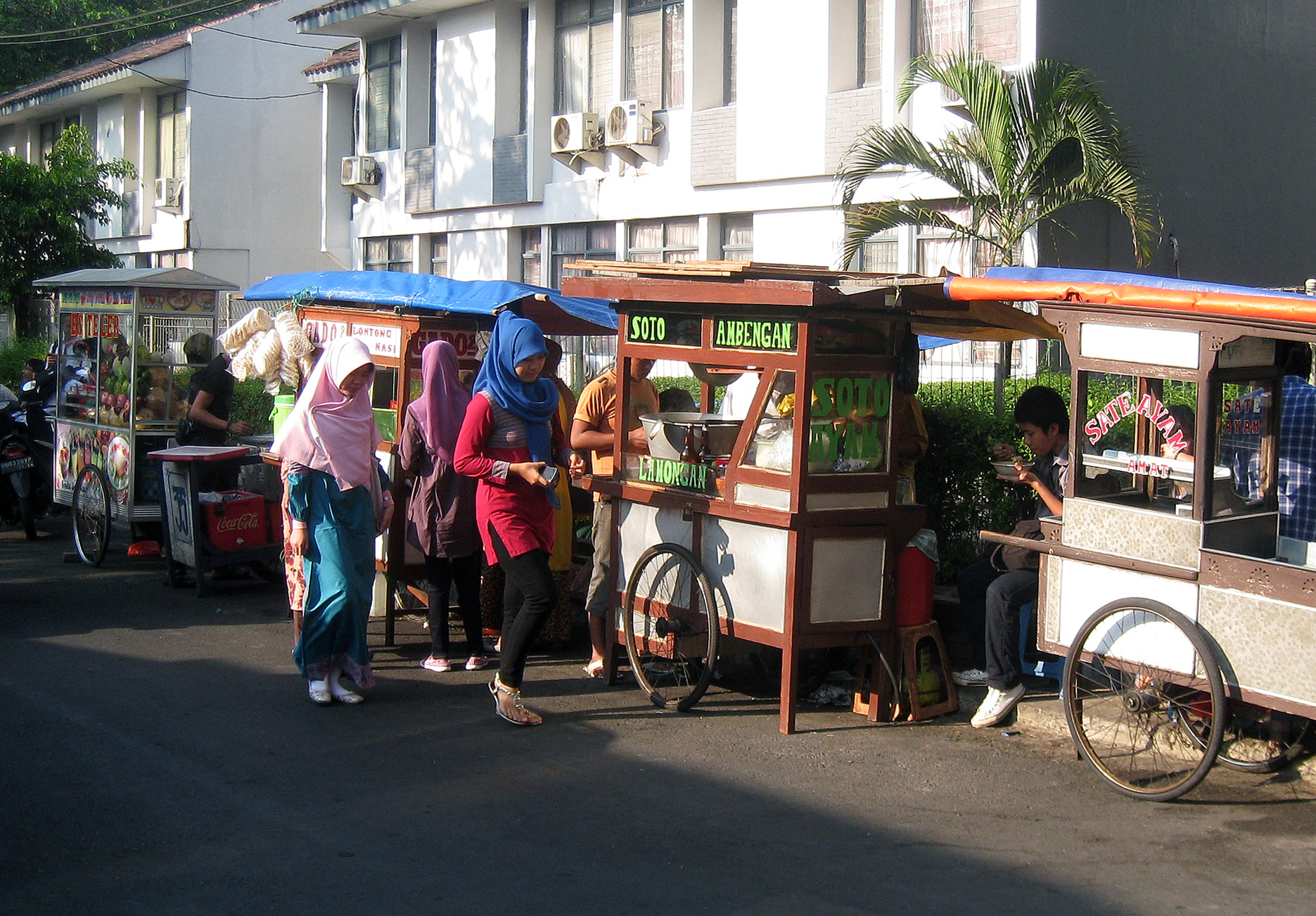
Traditional wood-and-glass food carts, known as Pedagang Kaki Lima, lining a street in Jakarta. They sell various forms of Indonesian street foods.

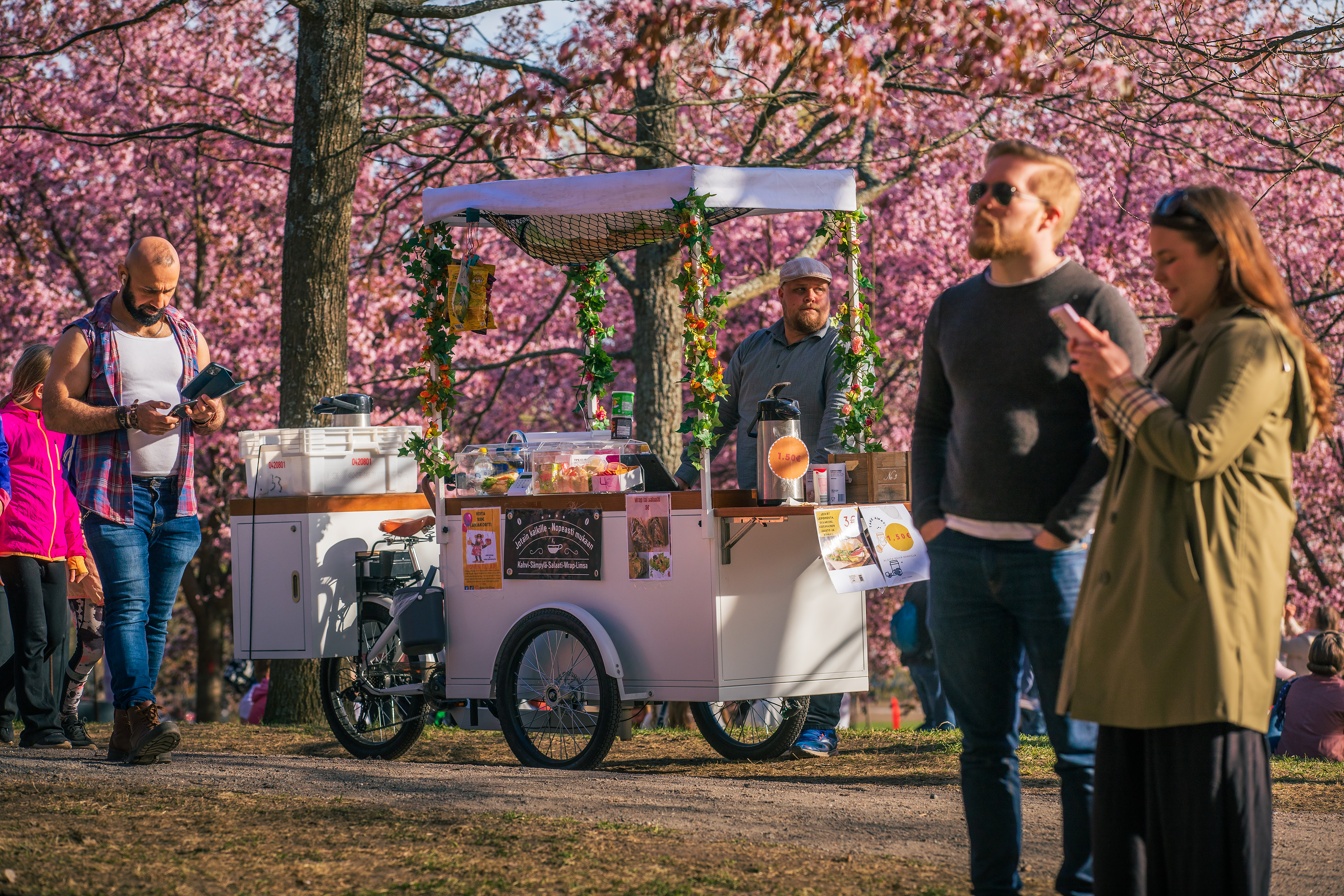
Food cart at the Kirsikkapuisto park in Helsinki, Finland

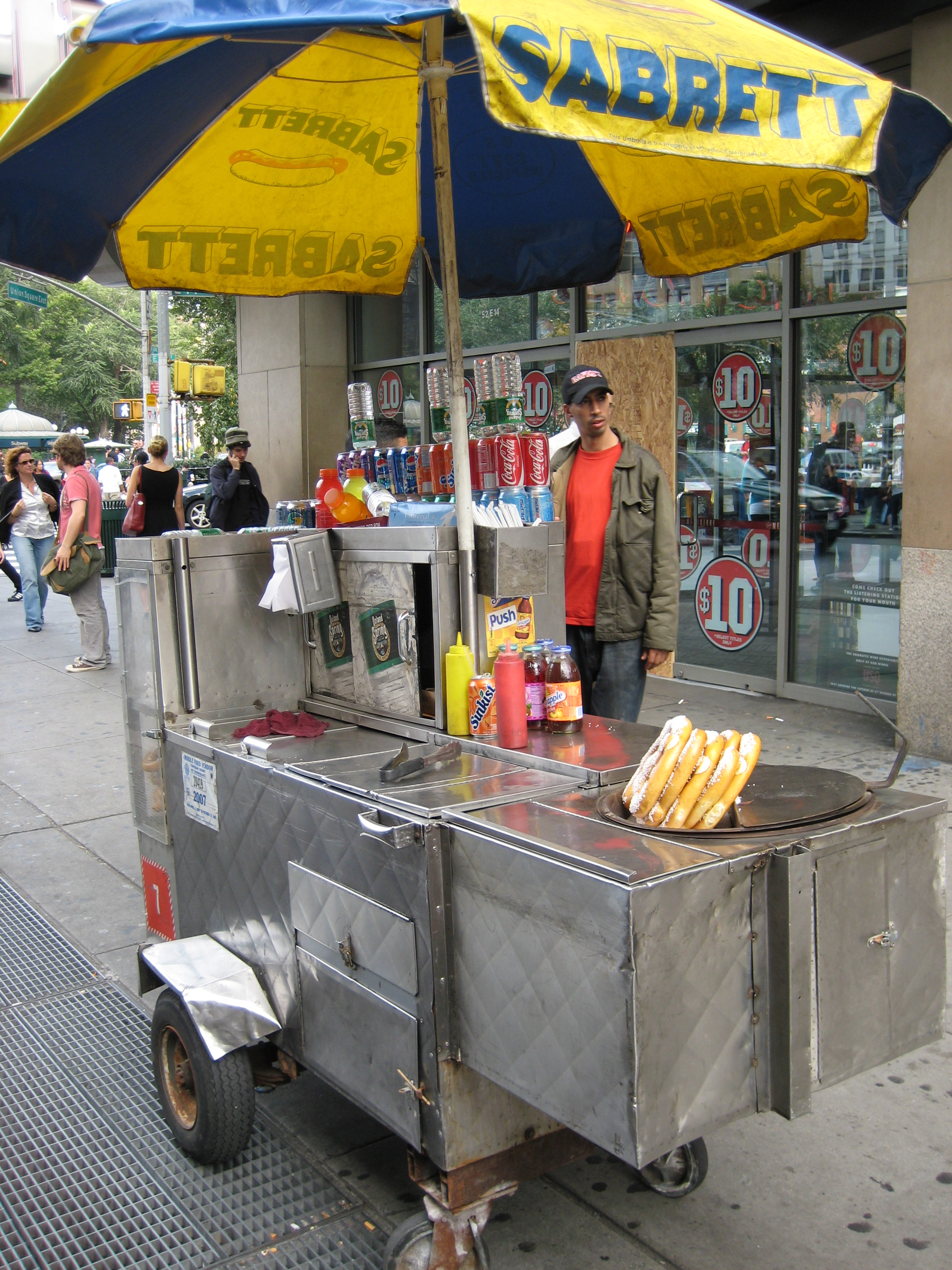
Sabrett hot dog cart in New York City, run by a street vendor

A food cart is a mobile kitchen set up on the street to prepare and sell street food to passers-by. Food carts are often found in cities worldwide selling food of every kind.

Food carts come in two basic styles. One allows the vendor to sit or stand inside and serve food through a window. In the other, the vendor stands next to the cart, while all the room in the cart is used for storage and to house the cooking machinery, usually a grilling surface. The cart style is determined principally by the type of food.

Food carts are different from food trucks because they do not travel under their own power. Some food carts are towed by another vehicle, while some are pushed by a human or animal.

== History ==
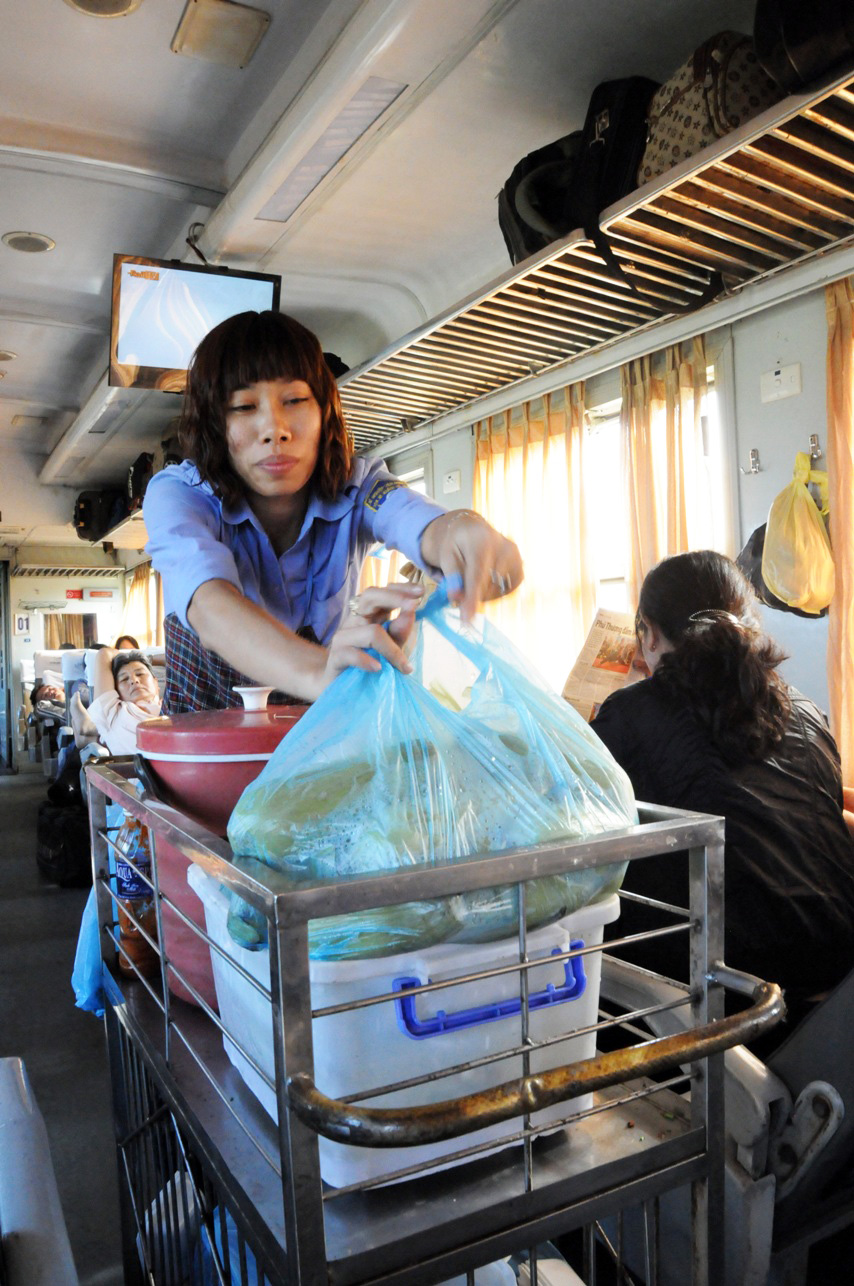
Vietnam Railways employee sells corn from a cart

The first food carts probably came into being at the time of the 5th century BCE Greek and Roman civilizations with traders converting old hand-carts and smaller animal-drawn carts into mobile trading units. Carts have the distinct advantage of mobility, should a location not be productive in sales, as well as for transporting goods to/from storage to the marketplace.

The first modern food cart can be seen in the 1866 when Charles Goodnight, a cattle rancher from Texas purchased a wagon to transport his cows to Colorado. Because the trip was so long, he customized the vehicle with shelves and drawers it make it convenient to carry food. His invention was later called the chuckwagon, chuck being slang for food in West America.

However, the use of carts exploded with the coming of railways. Firstly, highly mobile customers required food and drink to keep them warm within the early open carriages. Secondly, locomotives needed to stop regularly to take on coal and water, and hence allow their passengers use the toilets, eat and drink. Thirdly, few early trains had any form of buffet or dining car. Finally, when passengers did arrive at their destination, or at a point when they needed to switch trains or modes of transport, some refreshment was required, particularly for poorer passengers who could not afford to stay in the railway-owned hotels. This expansion lead to a mutually successful relationship with some of the first concession stands and laws developing from mobile traders operating from restricted railway property. This form of concession based operation can be seen still in many countries, but at its most original in the under developed stations and infrastructure of Africa and Southeast Asia.

The railways also brought another benefit: a plentiful supply of new suitably sized carts. Often traders requiring new carts would simply buy old railway station luggage carts and adapt them to serving food, knowing that these were sized/scaled to fit in between the necessary doors and lifts.

Today the size and scale of carts have generally increased, and most are towed behind 4x4 vehicles. But hand-towed food carts are still a common sight where access is restricted and hungry people can be found.

== Modern engineering and function ==
In the 21st century, innovations have included modular designed carts made with stainless steel, fiber reinforced plastic and aluminum. Some have been developed to drive themselves.

Some food carts are associated with restaurants. Most of the food served from the cart is the same as the food in the restaurant.

== See also ==
- Food booth
- Gastronorm, a European standard for food containers
- Kiosk
- List of food trucks
- List of street foods
- Mobile catering
- Serving cart
- Taco stand
- Yatai
- Pojangmacha
