= TEDxPortland =

Event in Portland, Oregon, U.S.

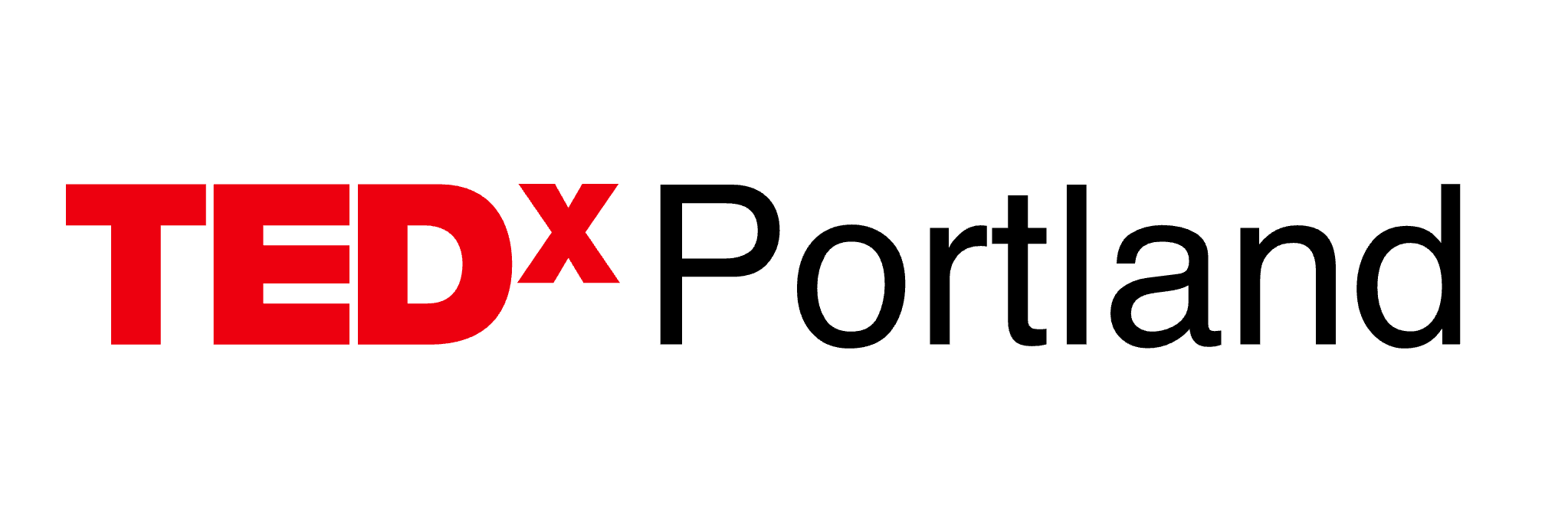
- Formation: 2009; 17 years ago
- Type: Conference
- Legal status: Active
- Location: Portland, Oregon, U.S.
- Region served: Portland metropolitan area
- Website: www.tedxportland.com

TEDxPortland is an independently organized TEDx event held annually in Portland, Oregon, United States. Founded in 2009, TEDxPortland is one of the largest and most recognized TEDx events in the world, and the largest indoor TEDx conference.

== History ==
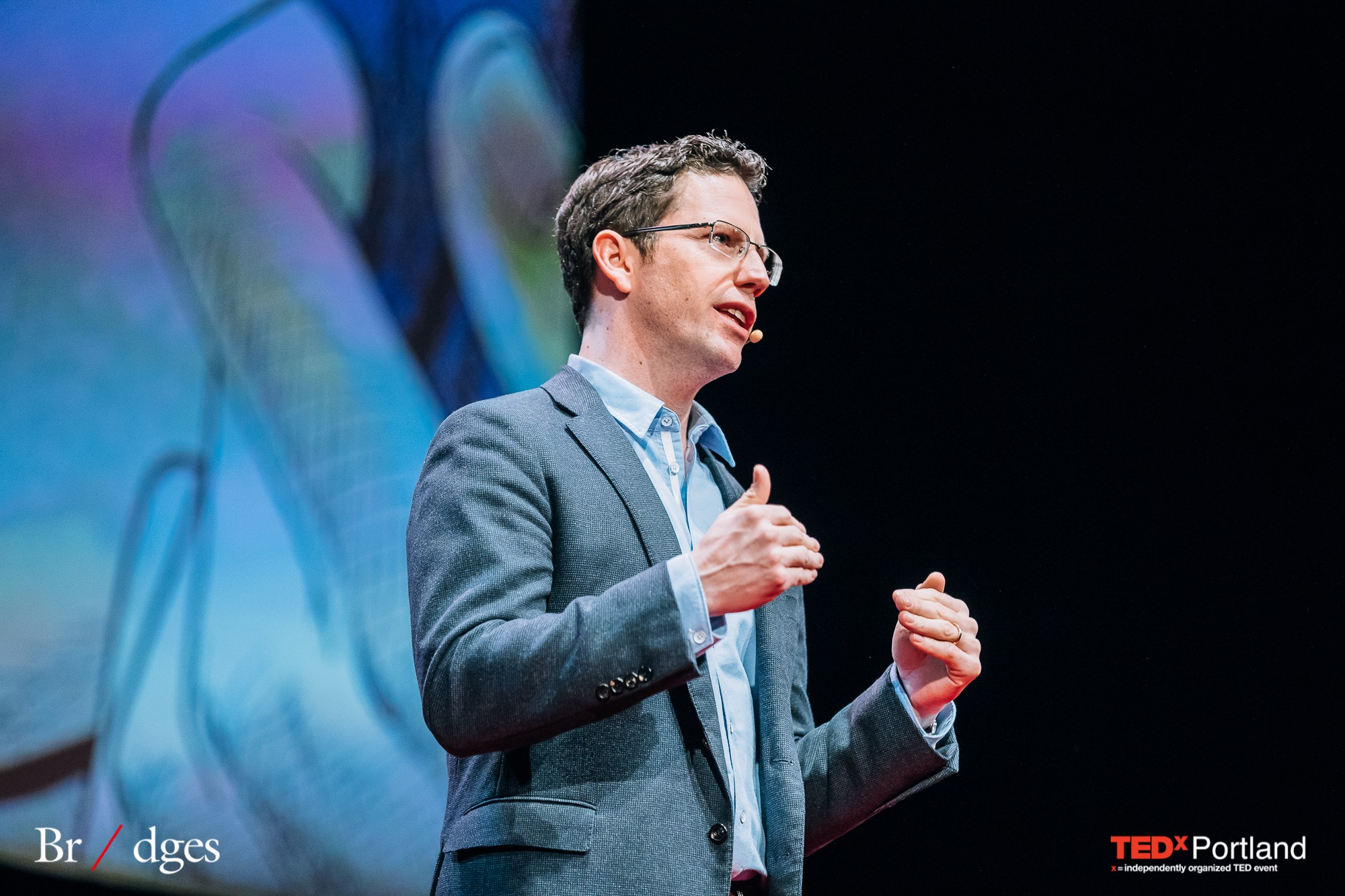
Historian Christopher McKnight Nichols speaking at the event in 2018

TEDxPortland was founded in 2009. Renny Gleeson is among co-founders and board members.

The event was held at Keller Auditorium in 2018 and 2019. The 2022 event was held at the Moda Center. In 2023, the event returned to Keller Auditorium.

TEDxPortland has featured a range of speakers and performers, including:

- Mike Bennett, artist and creator
- Scott J. Bolton
- Kevin Cavenaugh
- Ann Curry, journalist and former NBC News anchor
- Michael Curry
- Sarah Edmondson
- Thomas Lauderdale
- Christopher McKnight Nichols
- Colin O’Brady, world record-holding endurance athlete
- Oregon Symphony
- Liv Osthus (also known as Viva Las Vegas)
- Gabriel Rucker, chef and restauranteur
- Dennis Connors, American para-cyclist and para-climber, Paralympic silver medalist, and two-time world champion

TEDxPortland and Nike have collaborated on sneakers.
