= Canard (restaurant) =

Restaurant in Portland, Oregon, U.S.

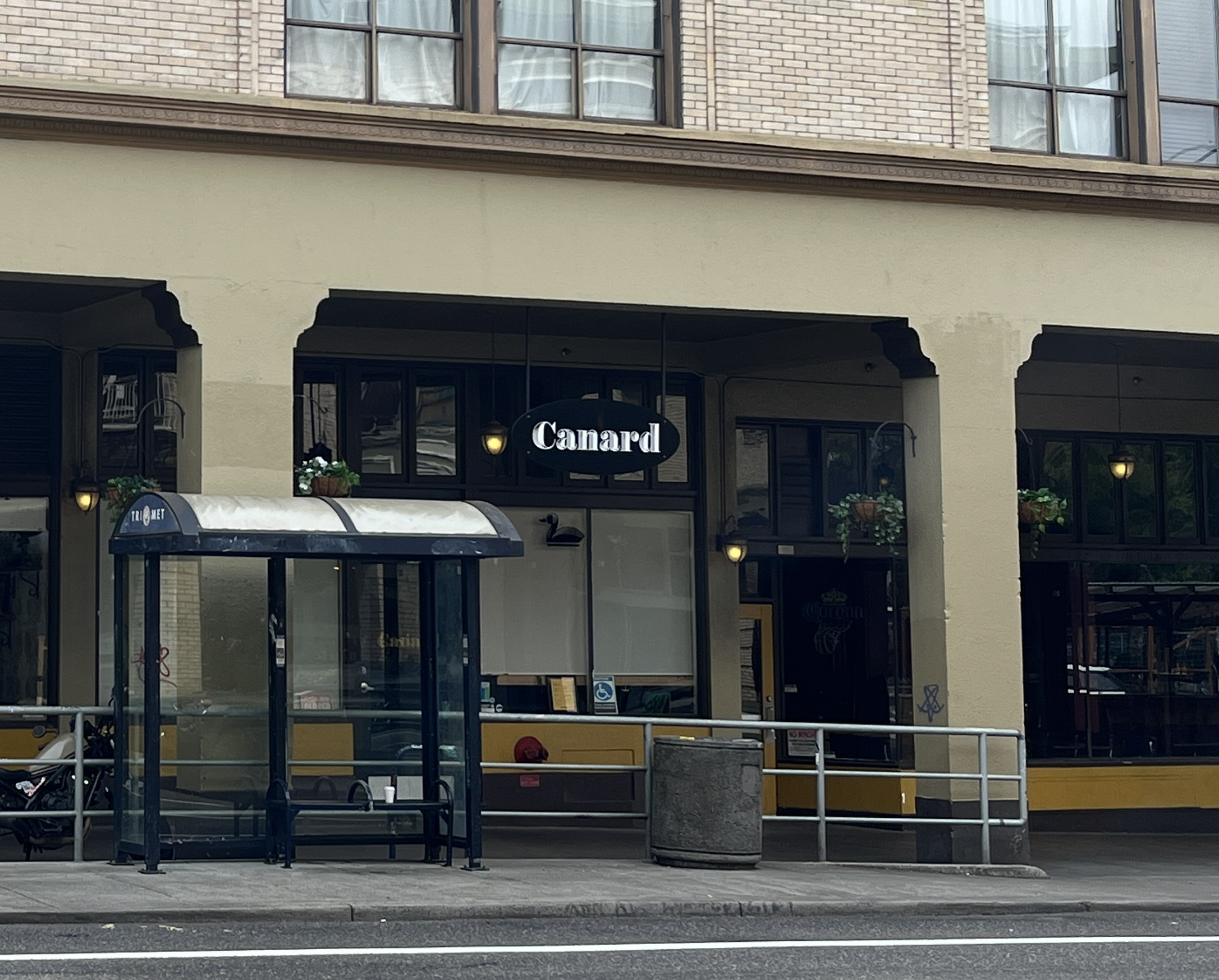
- The restaurant's exterior, 2022
- Interactive map of Canard

Restaurant information
- Established: April 2018
- Food type: French
- Location: 734 East Burnside Street, Portland, Multnomah, Oregon, 97214, United States
- Coordinates: 45.5228°N 122.6580°W
- Website: canardpdx.com

Canard is a French restaurant with two locations in the U.S. state of Oregon. The original restaurant opened in Portland. A second location opened in Oregon City in 2022. A third location opened in Beaverton in 2025.

== Description ==
Canard (French for "duck") is a restaurant with three locations in the U.S. state of Oregon. The original restaurant is located on East Burnside Street in southeast Portland's Buckman neighborhood, next to Le Pigeon, and outposts operate in nearby Oregon City and Beaverton.

The menu includes small plates such as foie gras dumplings with peanut sauce, fried chicken wings with truffle ranch, and sea urchin on Texas toast. The tartare is served with Chinese sausage, beef, and broccoli, and the New York steak comes with French onion soup sauce and Swiss cheese toast. The brunch menu includes fried chicken sandwiches with orange chile-wasabi mayonnaise, French toast, oysters, pancakes with duck sausage gravy, and Shrimp Toast Benedict. Canard also has a cocktail menu.

== History ==
Co-owners Gabriel Rucker and Andrew "Andy" Fortgang (Le Pigeon, Little Bird Bistro) opened the restaurant in April 2018. The restaurant's interior was designed by Mark Annen. The restaurant launched brunch in May.

In 2022, owners announced plans to open a second location in Oregon City. The restaurant is slated to open on July 10.

A third location opened in Beaverton, in the space that previously housed Beaverton Bakery, in 2025.

In 2026, Canard was among local restaurants, community organizations, and other businesses that joined the "We Are Rip City" campaign in support of the Moda Center renovation project.

== Reception ==
Steam burgers, 2022

In 2018, Eater named Canard one of the eighteen best new restaurants in the United States". Eater Portland, Portland Monthly, and The Oregonian named Canard the restaurant of the year. The business was a semifinalist in the Outstanding Wine Program of the 2020 James Beard Awards. Alex Frane and Brooke Jackson-Glidden included Canard in Eater Portland's 2021 list of eleven "charming" French restaurants in the city. The Oregon City location was also included in the website's 2025 list of Portland's best brunch restaurants. Katrina Yentch included Canard in the website's 2025 overview of the best restaurants in Buckman. Rebecca Roland included the Paris-brest in Eater Portland's 2025 overview of the city's eleven best restaurants for desserts.

Canard was a runner-up in the Best French Restaurant category of Willamette Week's annual 'Best of Portland' readers' poll in 2022 and 2024. It ranked second in the same category in 2025. In 2023, chef Dana Francisco was one of eighteen Portland industry professionals deemed "rising stars" by the restaurant resource and trade publication StarChefs. Canard was included in The Infatuation's 2024 list of Portland's best restaurants. Michael Russell included Canard in The Oregonian's 2025 list of the 21 best restaurants in southeast Portland.

== See also ==
- List of French restaurants
