= The Zipper (Portland, Oregon) =

Mixed-use development in the United States

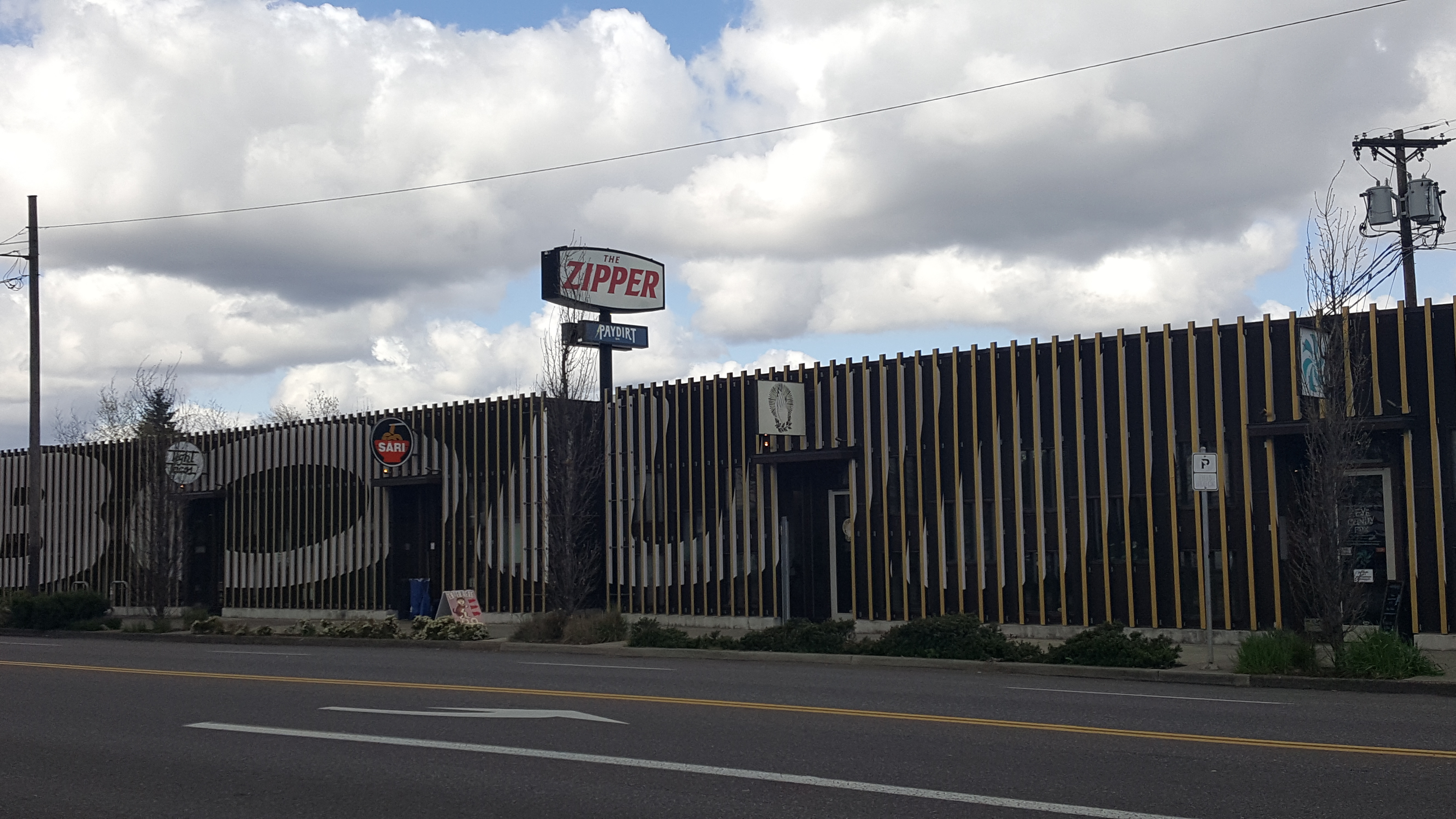
- The Zipper's exterior, 2022
- Interactive map of the The Zipper area

General information
- Location: Portland, Oregon, United States
- Coordinates: 45°31′45″N 122°38′16″W
- Opened: September 2015

The Zipper is a mixed-use development by Kevin Cavenaugh on Sandy Boulevard in the northeast Portland part of the Kerns neighborhood, in the U.S. state of Oregon. Established in 2015, the food hall has housed several restaurants and other businesses including Tight Tacos.

== Description and history ==
The Zipper opened in September 2015. The food hall is dog-friendly and has indoor and outdoor seating.

=== Tenants ===
The building has housed restaurants, a bar (Paydirt), a coffee shop, and a salon. Businesses have included Bywater Grocery, Chickpeadx, Rua, Seven Virtues Coffee Roasters, and Slice Pizza. Rua closed in February 2016 and was replaced by Basilisk, which has been described as a fried chicken sandwich shop. In 2017, Wares began operating in the space that had housed Bywater Grocery.

In December 2018, Chickpeadx announced plans to close permanently. The Argentine restaurant Boca Grande moved into the space in February 2019. In July, the owner of Wares announced plans to close; by October, the Korean restaurant Sari had started operating in the space. Tight Tacos began operating in The Zipper in September 2019. Tenants were not charged rent in April 2020, during the COVID-19 pandemic.

Boxcar Pizza began operating in The Zipper in August 2020.

== Reception ==
Katherine Chew Hamilton and Brooke Jackson-Glidden included The Zipper in Eater Portland's 2025 list of the city's best restaurants and food cart pods for large groups.
