= Gabriel Rucker =

American chef and restaurateur (born 1981/82)

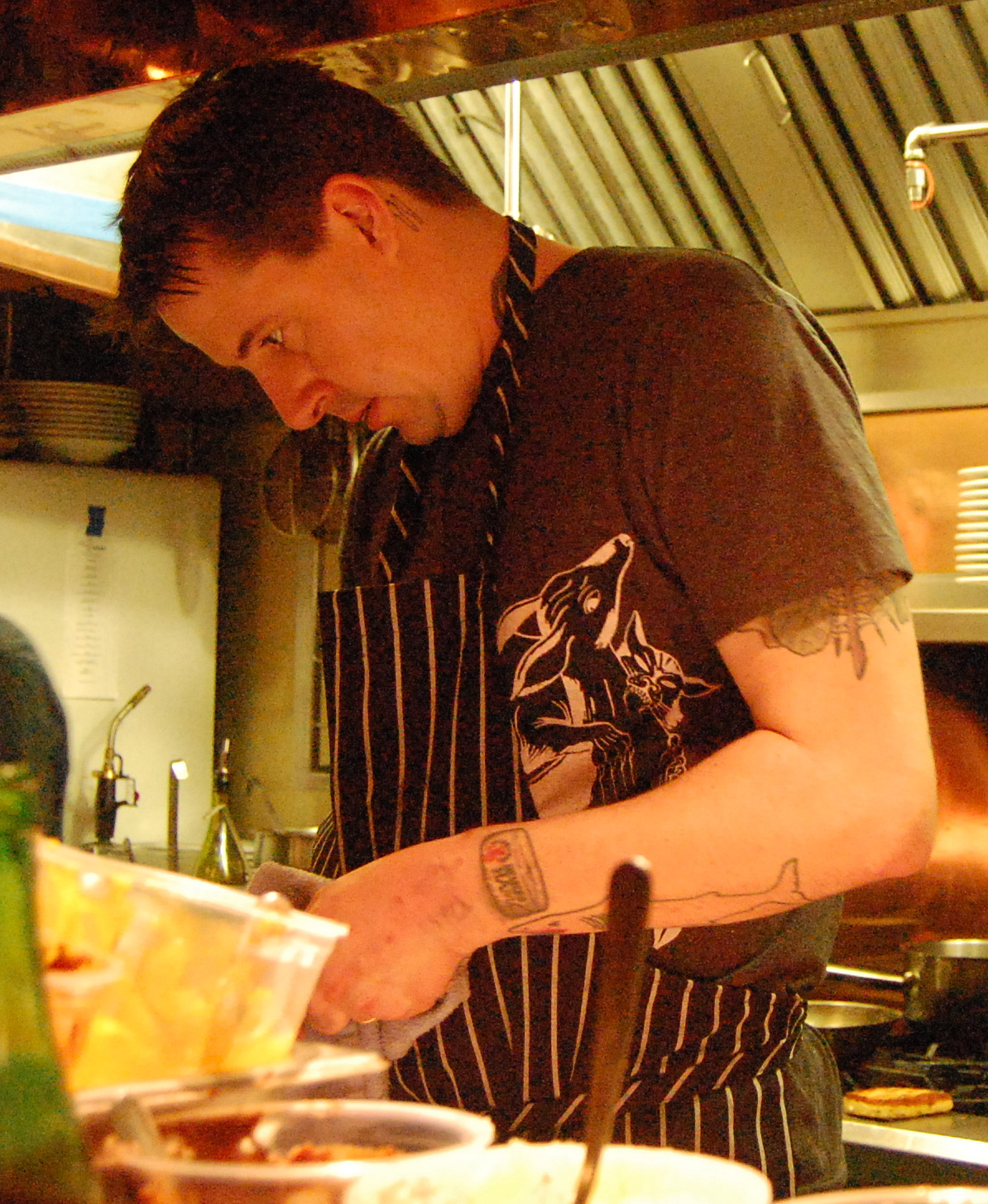
- Rucker cooking in 2010
- Born: 1981 or 1982 (age 44–45)
- Education: Santa Rosa Junior College
- Occupation: Chef

Gabriel Rucker is an American chef and owner of the restaurants Le Pigeon, Canard, and previously Little Bird Bistro, in Portland, Oregon. He has received two James Beard Foundation Awards.

== Early life and education ==
Gabriel Rucker was raised in Napa, California. As a child he watched the Great Chefs franchise which inspired him to begin cooking. After attending high school in the San Francisco Bay Area, he enrolled at Santa Rosa Junior College in 1999. He began a two-year culinary program at the college, but ultimately dropped out in favor of working in kitchens.

== Career ==
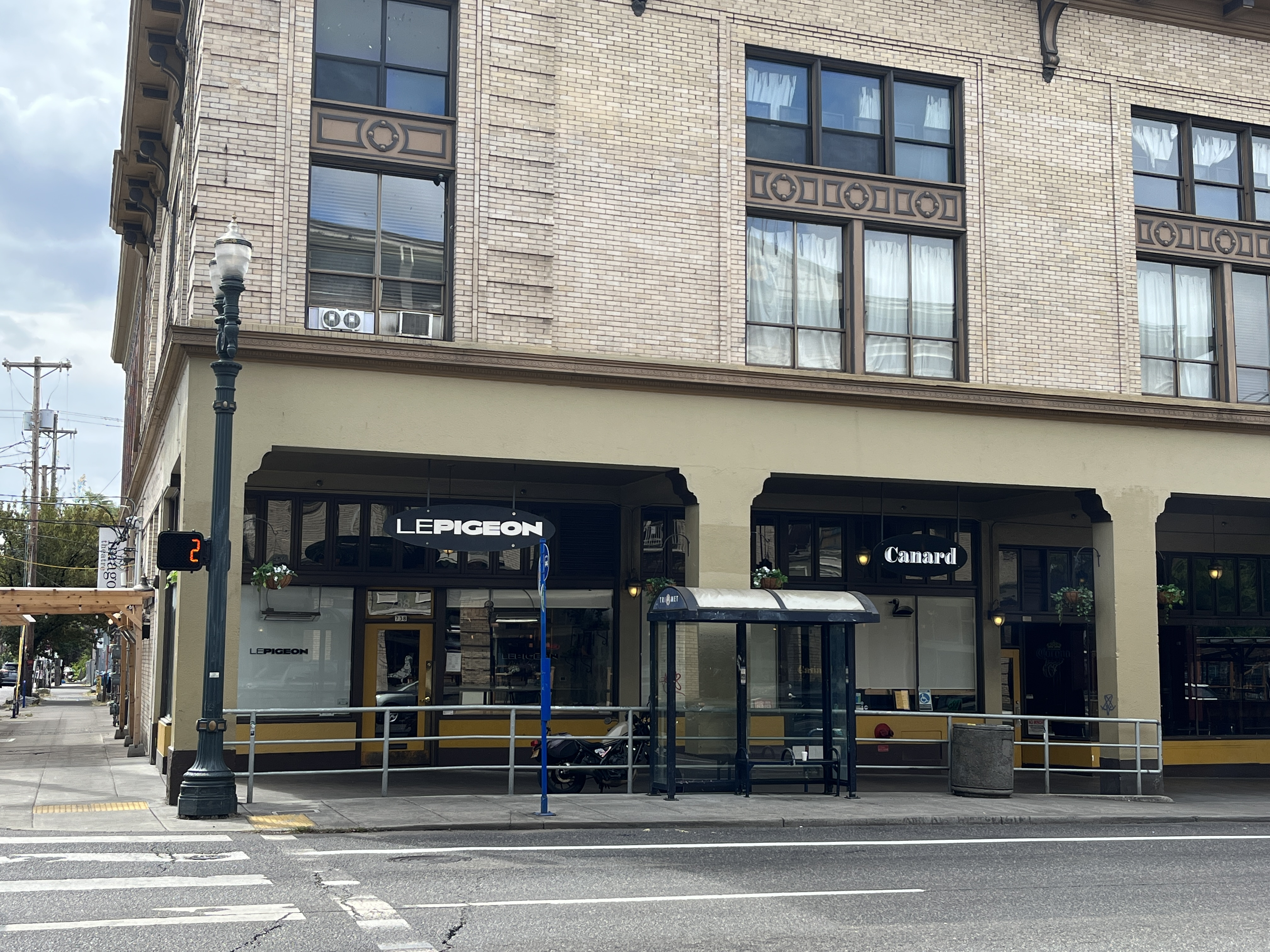
Exteriors of the restaurants Le Pigeon and Canard, 2022

Rucker worked at various restaurants in California until 2002, at which point he moved to Portland, Oregon, to experience its culinary scene. He worked at Paley's Place and was mentored by Vitaly Paley. He went on to become the head chef at Colleen's Bistro. By 2007, Colleen's Bistro was renamed to Le Pigeon under Rucker's management.

Rucker was a Food & Wine "Best New Chef" in 2007. He won the Rising Star Chef award at the 2011 James Beard Foundation Awards. He was nominated as Best Northwest Chef in 2012. In 2013, he won the James Beard Foundation Award for Best Northwest Chef and was a semifinalist for Outstanding Chef in 2025. Rucker released a cookbook in 2013 titled Le Pigeon: Cooking at the Dirty Bird. In 2018, he opened his third restaurant, Canard, next door to Le Pigeon, which offers "French bar food". He also offered cooking lessons and worked as a private chef during the COVID-19 pandemic.

Rucker was one of two local chefs who trained actor Nicolas Cage for his role as a Portland chef in the 2021 film Pig. That same year he appeared as a guest judge in the cooking competition show Top Chef. On the show he prepared a pigeon dish, and contestants were tasked with identifying the dish's ingredients in the dark before recreating it. Rucker spoke at a TEDxPortland conference in 2024.

== Personal life ==
Rucker is married and has three children. He previously struggled with alcoholism but became sober in October 2013. Rucker helped to found the Portland chapter of the nonprofit organization Ben's Friends after he found support in the organization. He has tattoos of birds on his arm, and the name of Le Pigeon was inspired by a pigeon tattoo of his.

== Bibliography ==
- Le Pigeon: Cooking at the Dirty Bird (2013)
