= Byways Cafe =

Defunct diner in Portland, Oregon, US

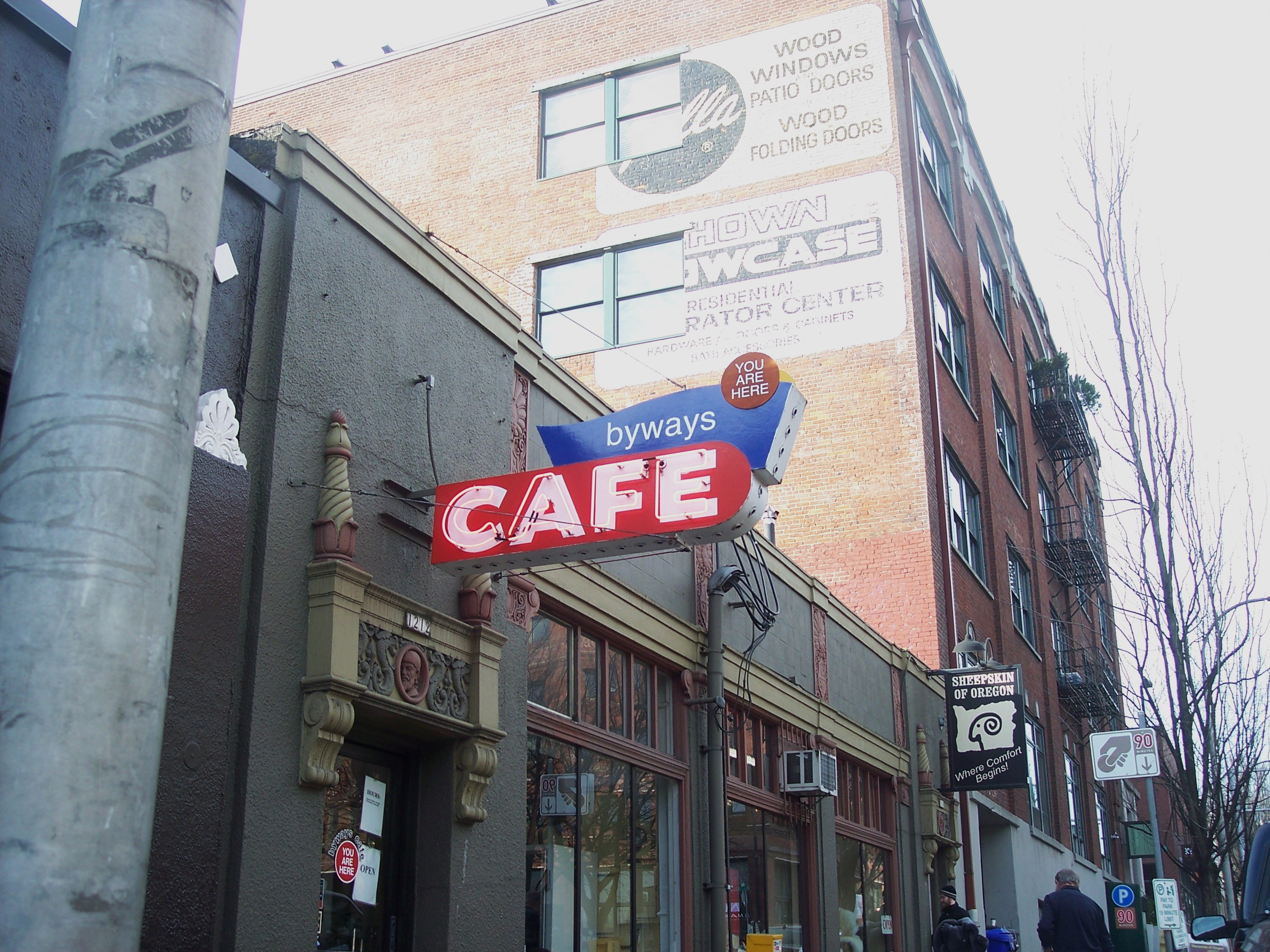
- The diner's exterior in 2004
- Interactive map of Byways Cafe

Restaurant information
- Established: 1999
- Owners: Collin McFadden; Megan Brinkley
- Food type: American
- Location: 1212 Northwest Glisan Street, Portland, Multnomah, Oregon, United States
- Coordinates: 45.52646°N 122.68366°W
- Website: bywayscafe.com

Byways Cafe was a diner in the Pearl District of Portland, Oregon, United States. Owners, Collin McFadden and Megan Brinkley, opened the restaurant in 1999, serving American breakfast and brunch comfort foods such as corned beef hash, omelets, and pancakes. Guy Fieri visited the diner for a 2007 episode of the Food Network show, Diners, Drive-Ins and Dives. Byways received generally positive receptions and was voted the city's "best brunch spot" by readers of The Oregonian in 2016. It closed in late 2019, after the owners were unable to reach a lease agreement with the landlord.

== Description ==
The diner was located along Glisan Street in northwest Portland's Pearl District. Andi Prewitt of Willamette Week described Byways as a "classic diner accented with red vinyl booths and lunch counter stools along with a black-and-white checkered floor".

The menu included comfort food such as corned beef hash, pancakes, scrambles, and milkshakes. Hollyanna McCollom's 2016 guide book, Moon Portland, says "locals have been flocking here for years to sample the omelets, scrambles, and corned beef hash. Byways is also famous for its blue corn pancakes, made with ground blue corn and served with honey pecan butter." In 2019, Alex Frane from Eater Portland said that Byways had served "a menu that has remained more or less constant: American breakfast and brunch classics like French toast, monte cristos, biscuits and gravy, and all sorts of egg scrambles and omelets, as well as a lunch menu of burgers and sandwiches. The vibe, too, is that of a classic American family-owned diner, with kitschy displays like decorative plates and license plates."

== History ==
Owners Collin McFadden and Megan Brinkley opened Byways in 1999. The space was previously occupied by Shakers Cafe, operated by Jeani Subotnick and Bruce Bauer, from 1991 to 1998. Shakers's decor was described as "kitschy-cool, with collections of salt and pepper shakers all over the place and chrome counter stools that evoked a bygone era". The cafe was known for "homemade pies, massive pancakes, killer scones, and cup after cup of strong coffee". Cindy's Helvetia Cafe briefly operated in the space after Shakers.

Guy Fieri visited Byways in 2007, for a "retro-themed" episode on the first season of the Food Network's Diners, Drive-Ins and Dives. During the episode, Fieri "raved about the corned beef hash and Brinkley's house-made desserts".

=== Closure ===
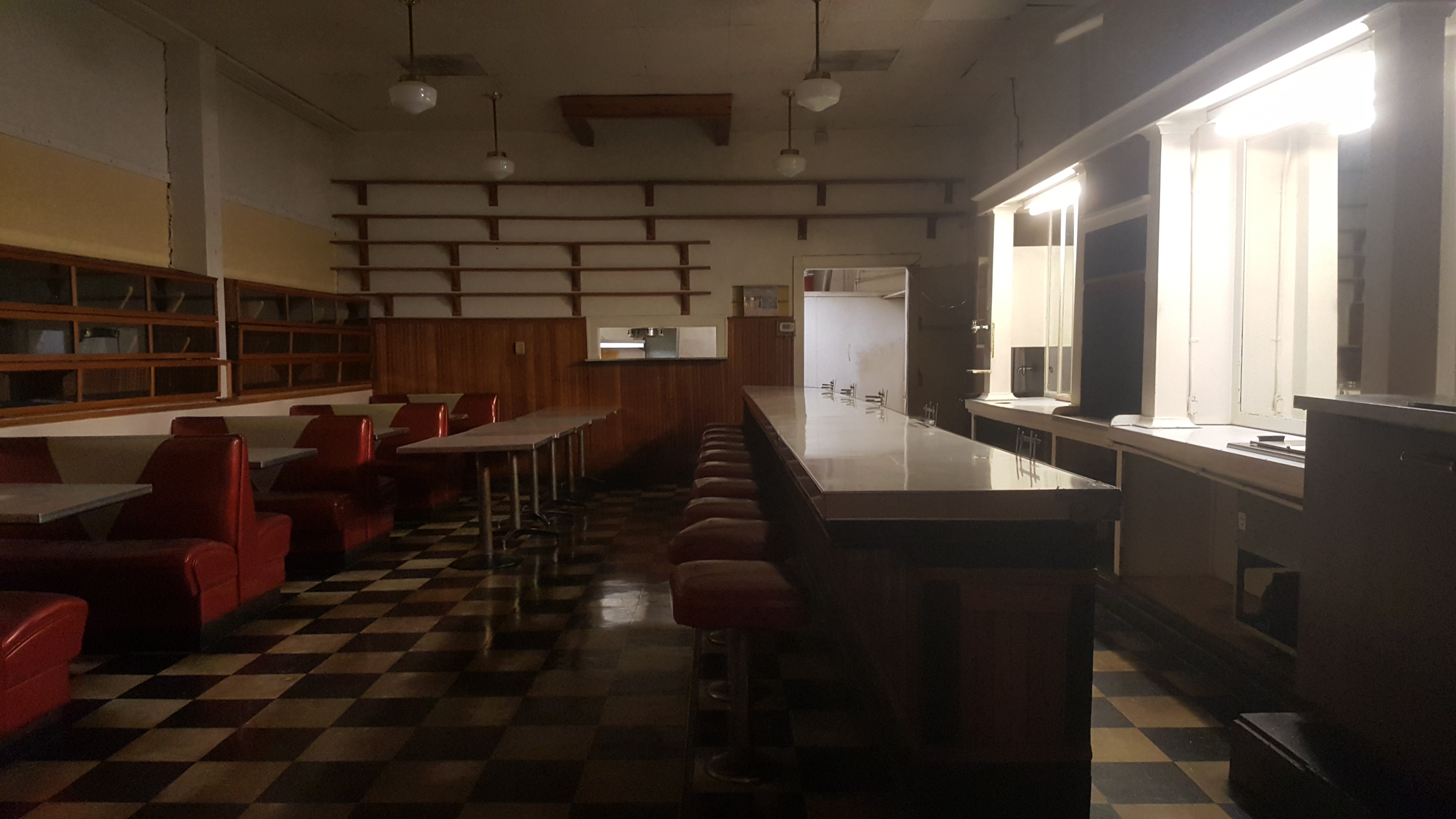
The diner's interior in February 2020, after closing in late 2019

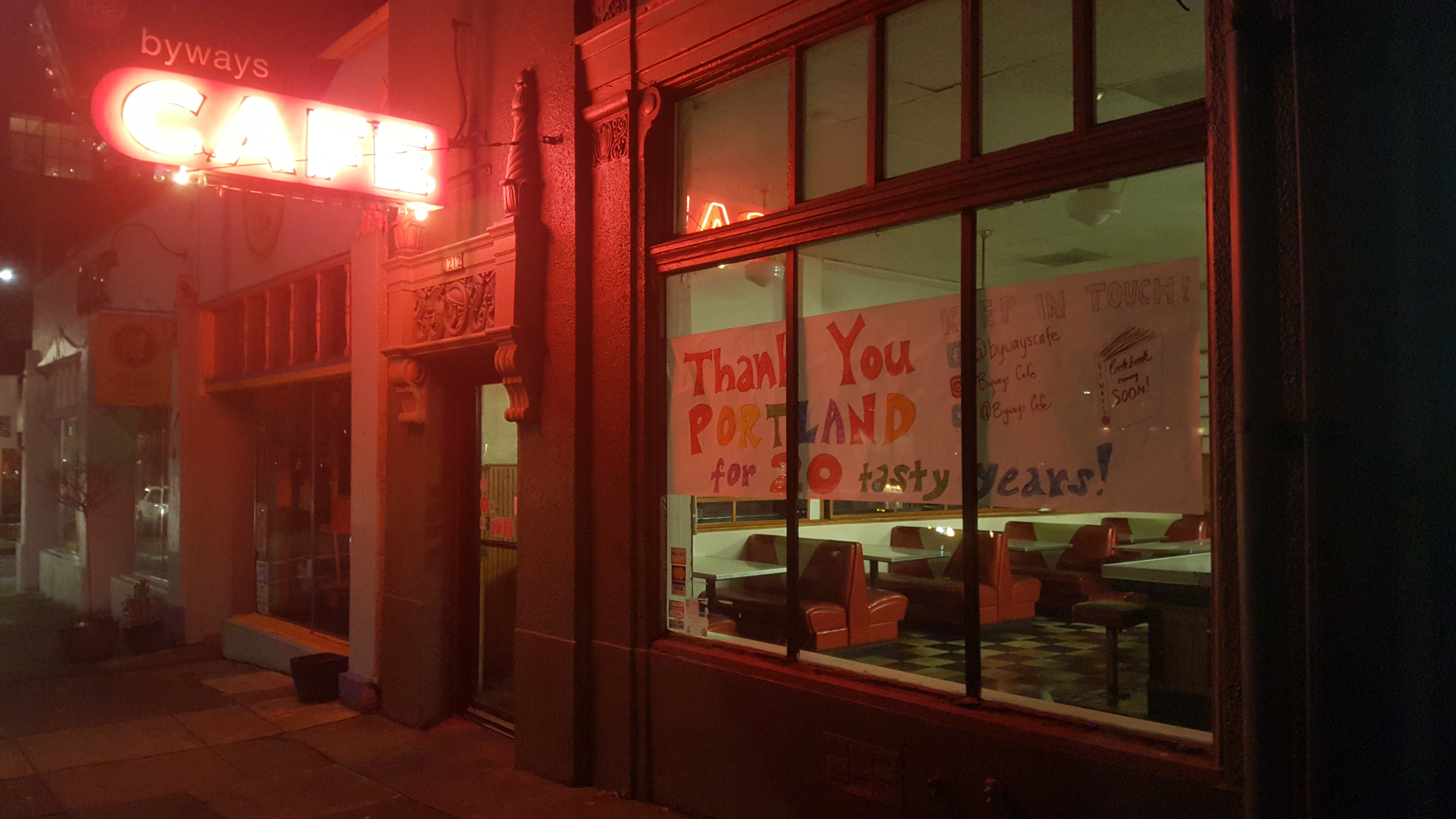
The restaurant's exterior at night, in 2020, with a sign thanking patrons

In November 2019, McFadden and Brinkley announced plans to close before the end of the year. They were unable to reach a lease agreement with the building's owners. The duo wrote on Facebook,

"It's been well known that our building has been for sale for almost 2 years and that we have never had the resources to buy it ourselves. Unfortunately we haven't been able to work out a lease that will allow us to keep Byways moving along like it always has. We will miss the community space that Byways has become, and the time spent with staff, customers, and family."

Additionally, they invited patrons for a "last meal" and expressed an eagerness to move on, writing:

"We have spent over half our lives at Byways and we are ready and excited to have the chance to pursue other interests. Our customers have meant everything to us over the years. We've seen babies born that have turned into young adults. And the early risers that are there every day when we unlock the door in the morning are some of the memories we will cherish. The neighborhood around us has changed so much, but we lasted for so long and we are so proud."

== Reception ==
In 2008, Ted Wheeler said that Byways Cafe was his favorite restaurant. Byways was listed as an "editors' choice" in the eighth edition of the guide book, Best Places: Portland (2010). In Moon Portland, McCollom stated, "The corn cakes are good, but nothing compares to the amaretto French toast". She advised, "The weekend wait can be long here, as at many Portland restaurant joints. To make it more bearable, arrive early, bring something to read, and pick up something caffeinated on the way." In 2016, readers of The Oregonian voted Byways the city's "best brunch spot" in an online "People's Choice" poll. Byways gained support using social media and earned 23 percent of the vote. The newspaper's Lizzy Acker ranked the diner fourth in her 2019 list of the city's top 25 corned beef hashes, writing:

The corned beef hash at this Pearl District classically inspired cafe almost seems unfair. Cubes of corned beef, potatoes, onions and green bell peppers are joined by a delicious outside not found in most dishes citywide: Cheese. Where some hashes fall flat in the flavor or interest department, the hash here shines thanks in part to our cheesy friend. Byways has the look of a café that's been around for a few generations, and the state-themed license plates and luggage lining the walls conjure dreams of the open road. If you have a pit stop, pull up at the counter and order the hash.

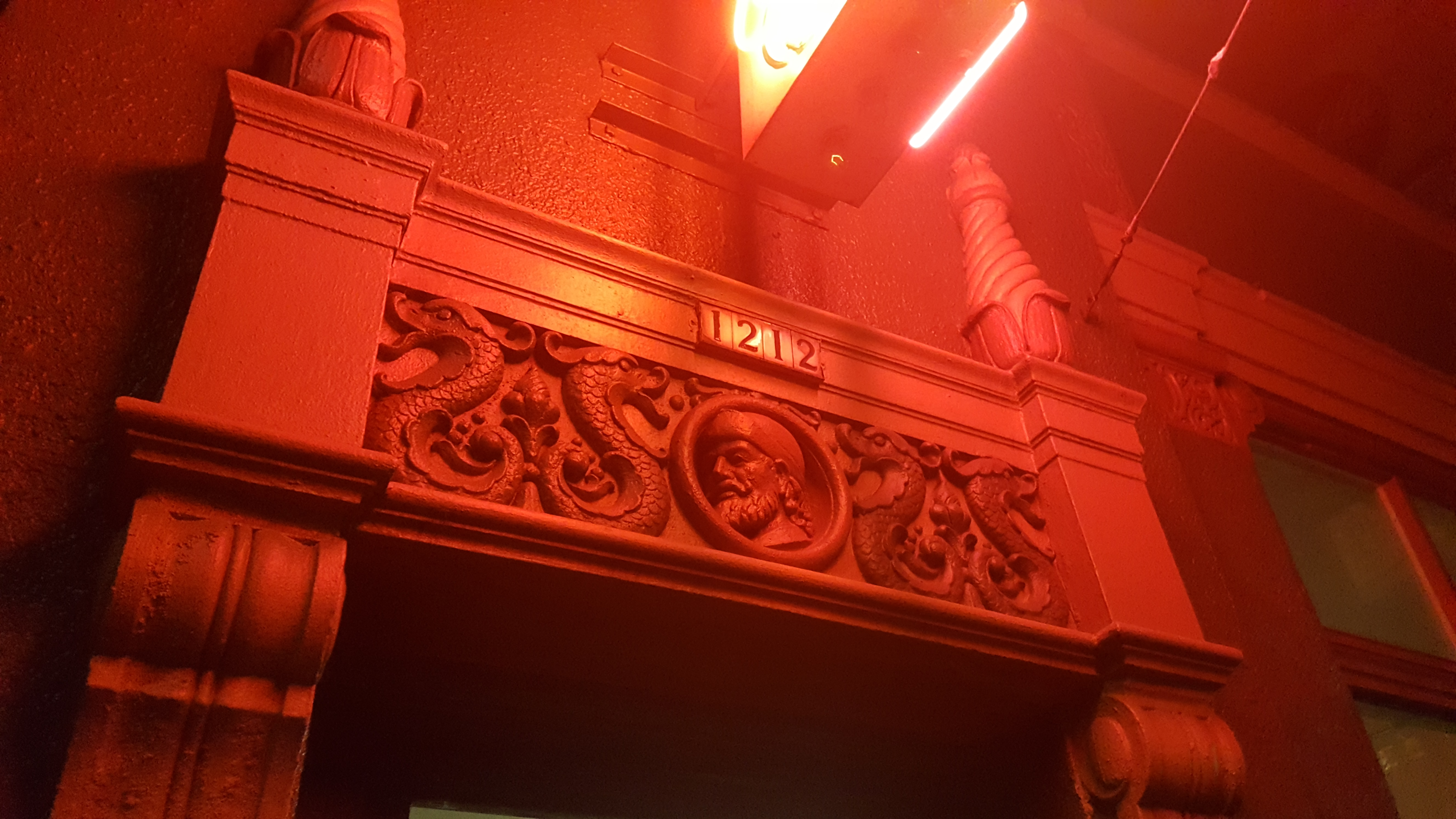
Detail of the restaurant's exterior under the glow of a neon sign at night

Following confirmation of the pending closure, Michael Russell of The Oregonian said the diner was "one of Portland's longest-running and best-loved brunch spots, a tchotchke-filled slice of Americana that felt out of time even before its surrounding Pearl District neighborhood grew up all around it". Willamette Week's And Prewitt described Byways as "one of Portland's breakfast institutions". Wm. Steven Humphrey of the Portland Mercury described Byways as "adorable and yummy" and considered the confirmed closure as "probably the saddest food news of the week".

Eater Portland's Alex Frane called Byways a "longstanding and beloved breakfast spot" and said its closure made "a sizable dent in the Pearl District's breakfast scene". The website's Brooke Jackson-Glidden also called Byways a "Portland breakfast institution". In December 2019, Sander Gusinow of Oregon Business said the diner's closure, along with the closing of Little Bird Bistro, explained why "restaurant entrepreneurs would err on the side of caution when it comes to opening dining venues downtown".

== See also ==
- List of diners
- List of Diners, Drive-Ins and Dives episodes
