= Yard (Portland, Oregon) =

Apartment building in Portland, Oregon, U.S.

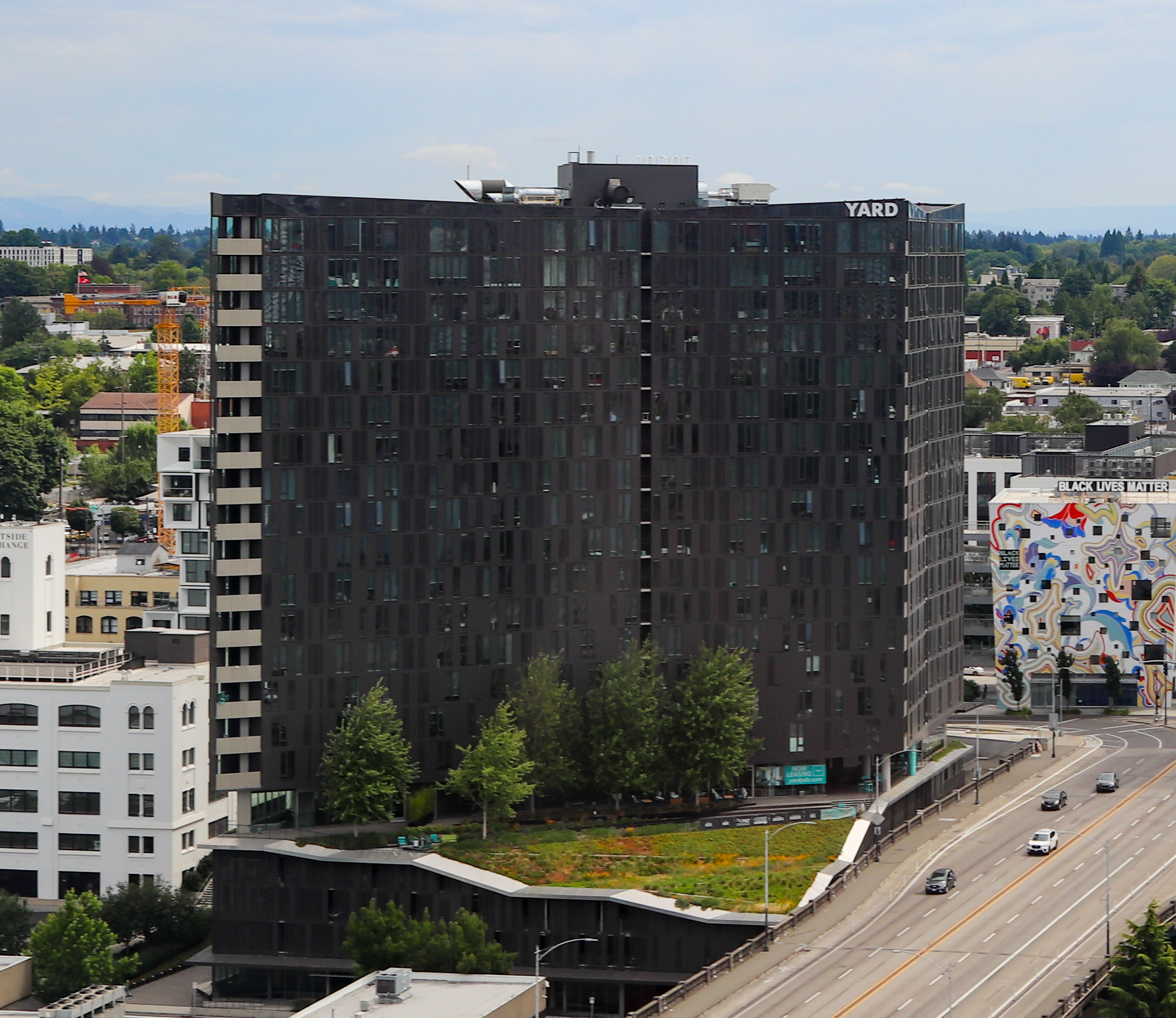
- The building in August 2020

- Location within Portland, Oregon

General information
- Status: Completed
- Location: Portland, Oregon, United States
- Coordinates: 45.52338°N 122.66323°W
- Construction started: 2015
- Topped-out: 2016

Height
- Height: 206 feet (63 m)

Technical details
- Floor count: 21

Design and construction
- Architect: Skylab

Yard is a 21-story, 206-foot (63 m)-tall apartment building built at the Burnside Bridgehead in Portland, Oregon's Kerns neighborhood, in the United States. It was designed by Skylab Architecture for Key Development Co. of Hood River and Guardian Real Estate Services of Portland.

== Description ==
Yard includes 21 above ground floors. The 206-foot (63 m)-tall concrete and glass high rise was designed by Skylab Architecture. It is a mixed-use development with ground floor retail and 284 apartments. The sixth through eighth floors are set aside for working-class studio apartments, available through a lottery process.

Given its appearance, the building is referred to as the "Death Star" and was dubbed "the new apartment building you'll love to hate".

== History ==
The Portland Development Commission started buying land at the east end of the Burnside Bridge about 2000 for a redevelopment project, eventually spending $11 million. Plans were first submitted to develop the property in 2006, but eventually the project was delayed due to the Great Recession. Construction began in October 2014 on what was estimated to be a $58 million project. The building topped out in January 2016 with a ceremony attended by Congressman Earl Blumenauer.

The Yard is the winner of a 2018 honor award from the American Society of Landscape Architects.
