= Burnside Bridgehead =

Development project in Portland, Oregon, U.S.

Coordinates: 45.52338°N 122.66323°W

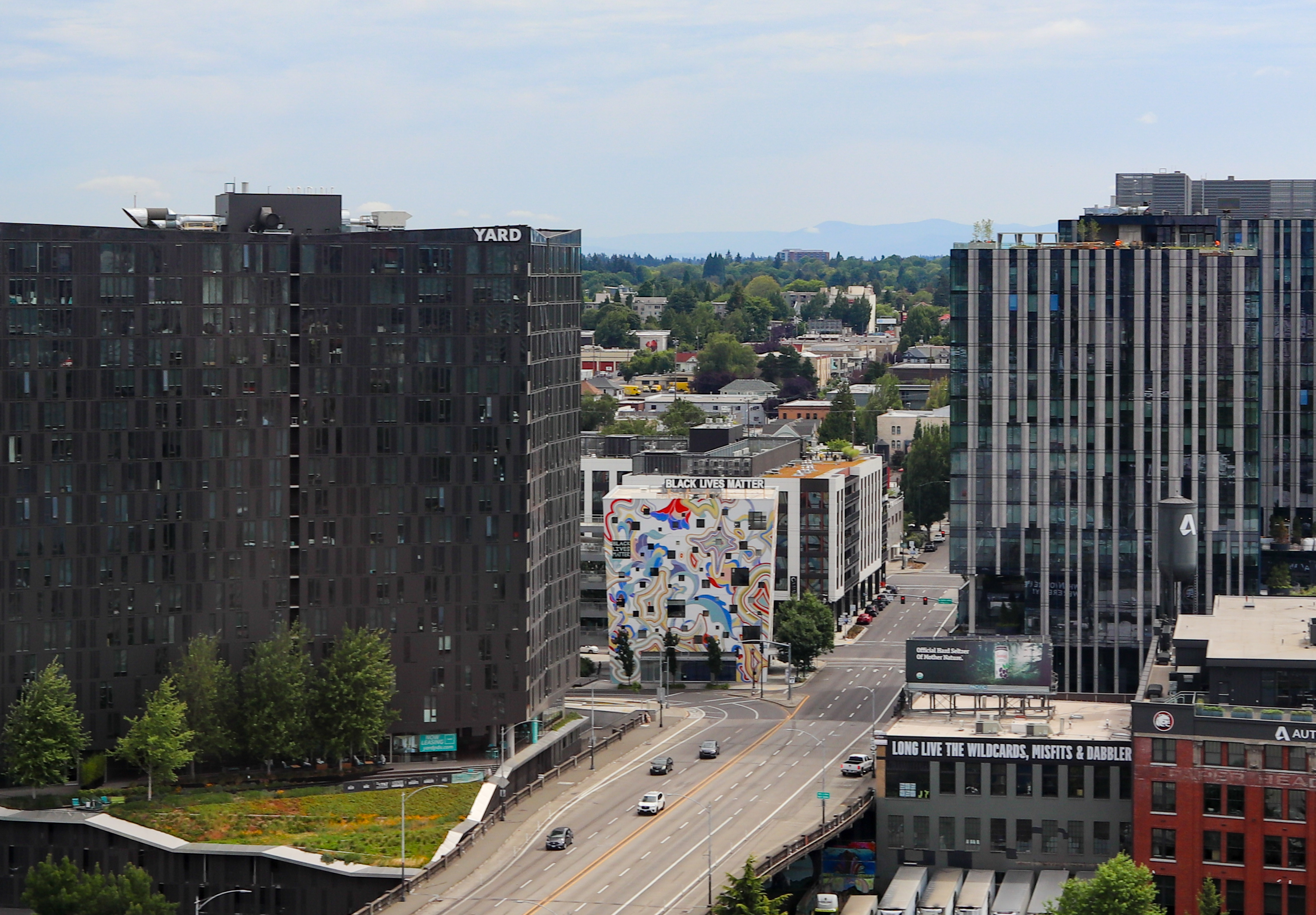
View of the Burnside Bridgehead buildings

The Burnside Bridgehead is a development project at the northeast end of the Burnside Bridge in Portland, Oregon's Kerns neighborhood, in the United States.

The site includes:

- Yard, a black 21-story apartment building completed in 2017
- Fair-Haired Dumbbell, two brightly colored connected six-story towers, completed in 2017
- Blake McFall Company Building; historic, home to Autodesk
- Slate building, 10 stories
- Eastside Exchange; historic
- Union Arms Apartments; historic
- Sideyard, designed by Skylab; 4 stories of cross-laminated timber, completed in 2020
- Frigidaire Building
