= Boxcar Pizza =

Pizzeria in Portland, Oregon, U.S.

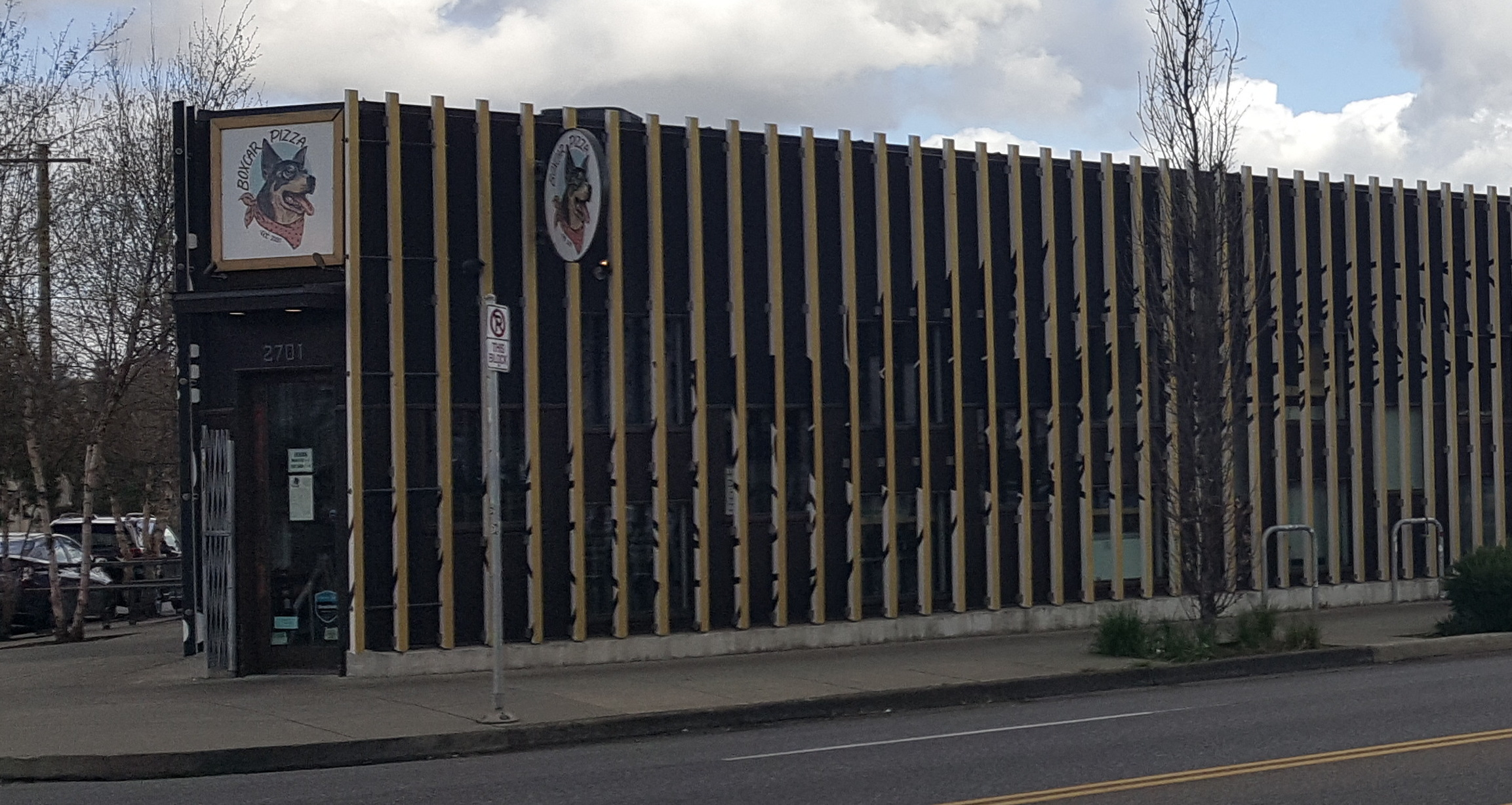
- Exterior of The Zipper with signs for Boxcar Pizza, 2022
- Interactive map of Boxcar Pizza

Restaurant information
- Established: August 2020
- Owner: Odie O'Connor
- Location: Portland, Multnomah, Oregon, United States
- Coordinates: 45.528943°N 122.638259°W

Boxcar Pizza is a vegan pizzeria in Portland, Oregon, United States. Odie O'Connor opened the restaurant in August 2020, during the COVID-19 pandemic. The business operates in The Zipper, a mixed-use development in the northeast Portland part of the Kerns neighborhood.

== Description ==
The vegan restaurant Boxcar Pizza serves Detroit-style pizza in the food hall of The Zipper, a mixed-use development on Sandy Boulevard in the northeast Portland part of Portland, Oregon's Kerns neighborhood. Pizza ingredients include coconut oil-based mozzarella, seitan bacon, gluten-free soy curl chicken, and vegetable protein sausage, as well as blue cheese and ricotta made with tofu.

The cheeseburger pizza has cheddar and mozzarella, cherry tomatoes, pickles, red onion, and burger sauce. The Ape Dos Mil has red sauce, basil, mozzarella, and parmesan. The Bianca has Good Planet mozzarella, an Italian sauce with fennel, and tofu-based ricotta. The Green Supreme has red sauce, Mama Lil's hot peppers, and kale, and the Jimmy Pesto Special is a tribute to the Italian restaurant owner on the animated sitcom Bob's Burgers with cheddar, mozzarella, jalapeños, pesto, vegetable protein "pepperoni", and hot agave syrup. The Steaky Break Heart has steak, cheddar, mozzarella, pickled red onions, and a cilantro lime aioli. The Strings of Nashville has vegan Nashville hot chicken nuggets, pickles, and ranch. Boxcar has gluten-free and "alternative diet" options.

The restaurant's seating capacity is approximately 100 people (which was reduced to approximately 40 people during the pandemic because of social distancing requirements. Boxcar's logo depicts Homer, the owner's Australian Cattle Dog.

== History ==
Odie O'Connor opened Boxcar in August 2020, during the COVID-19 pandemic. Boxcar has been described as a Portland's first vegan Detroit-style pizzeria and a "sister" establishment to O'Connor's defunct restaurant Baby Blue Pizza, which closed in 2022. In 2023, Eater Portland said Baby Blue sometimes appears as a pop-up at Boxcar.

In April 2021, Boxcar closed for a weekend after a couple refused to wear face masks. For Pizza Week in 2023, the restaurant served a special called the Birria Pie, which had a plant-based birria, cheddar, mozzarella, cilantro, onion, and a side of consommé. For the same promotion in 2024, Boxcar served a special pizza called the Smash or Pass, which had vegan beef, cheddar, mozzarella, lettuce, onion, sesame seeds, and burger sauce.

== Reception ==
Boxcar was nominated for best pizzeria by VegNews. The business ranked third in the Best Vegan Pizzeria category of the magazine's annual Restaurant Awards in 2024. Tasting Table included Boxcar in a 2024 list of the 24 "top-rated" restaurants for vegan pizza in the U.S.

In her 2020 review for the Portland Mercury, Suzette Smith wrote, "The crust at Boxcar (I got the regular, not the gluten-free) is a pillowy delight, but perhaps not crunchy enough to rival the true Detroit pizza crust. To be honest, that feels like the best of both worlds. Boxcar started as Detroit-style pizza, but landed on a cloud of puffy crust that is perfectly wonderful in its own right." Katherine Chew Hamilton and Karen Brooks included Boxcar in Portland Monthly's 2021 overview of the city's best new vegan restaurants, food carts, and pop-ups. Boxcar was also included in The Oregonian's 2022 list of Portland's ten best new "pandemic-time" pizzerias.

Waz Wu included Boxcar in Eater Portland's 2021 list of the city's "exciting" new vegan and vegetarian restaurants and 2023 overview of the city's "knockout" vegan pizza. Brenna Houck included the business in the website's 2025 list of Portland's eighteen best vegan and vegetarian restaurants. Boxcar was a runner-up in the Best Pizza category of Willamette Week's annual 'Best of Portland' readers' poll in 2024. Krista Garcia included the business in The Infatuation's 2024 overview of Portland's best pizza. Boxcar was included in a Yelp list of Portland's ten best vegan eateries in 2025.

== See also ==
- List of vegetarian and vegan restaurants
- Pizza in Portland, Oregon
