= Fair-Haired Dumbbell =

Building in Portland, Oregon, U.S.

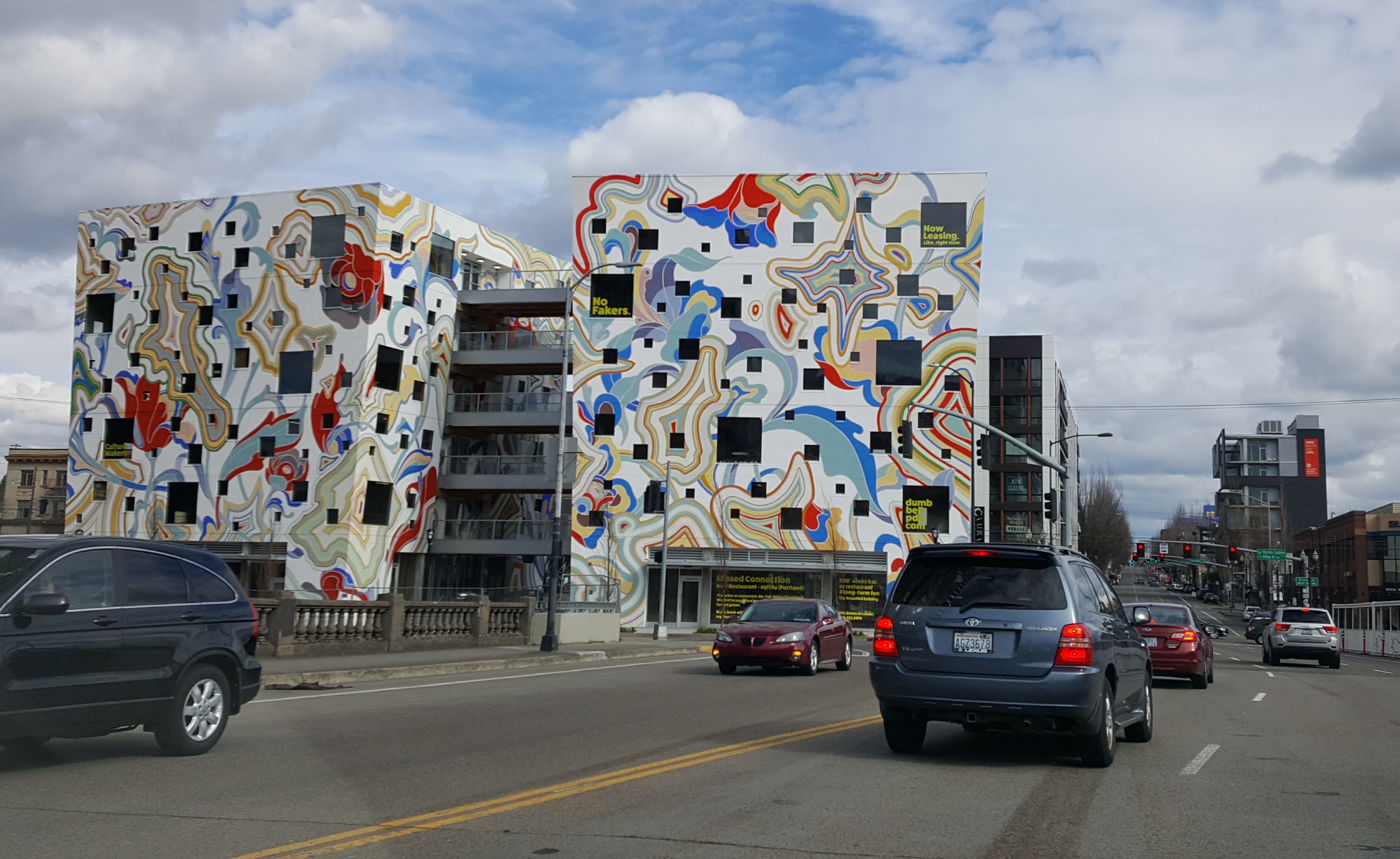
- The building's exterior, 2018

- Location within Portland, Oregon

General information
- Location: 11 Northeast Martin Luther King Jr. Blvd., Portland, Oregon, United States
- Coordinates: 45.5233°N 122.66209°W

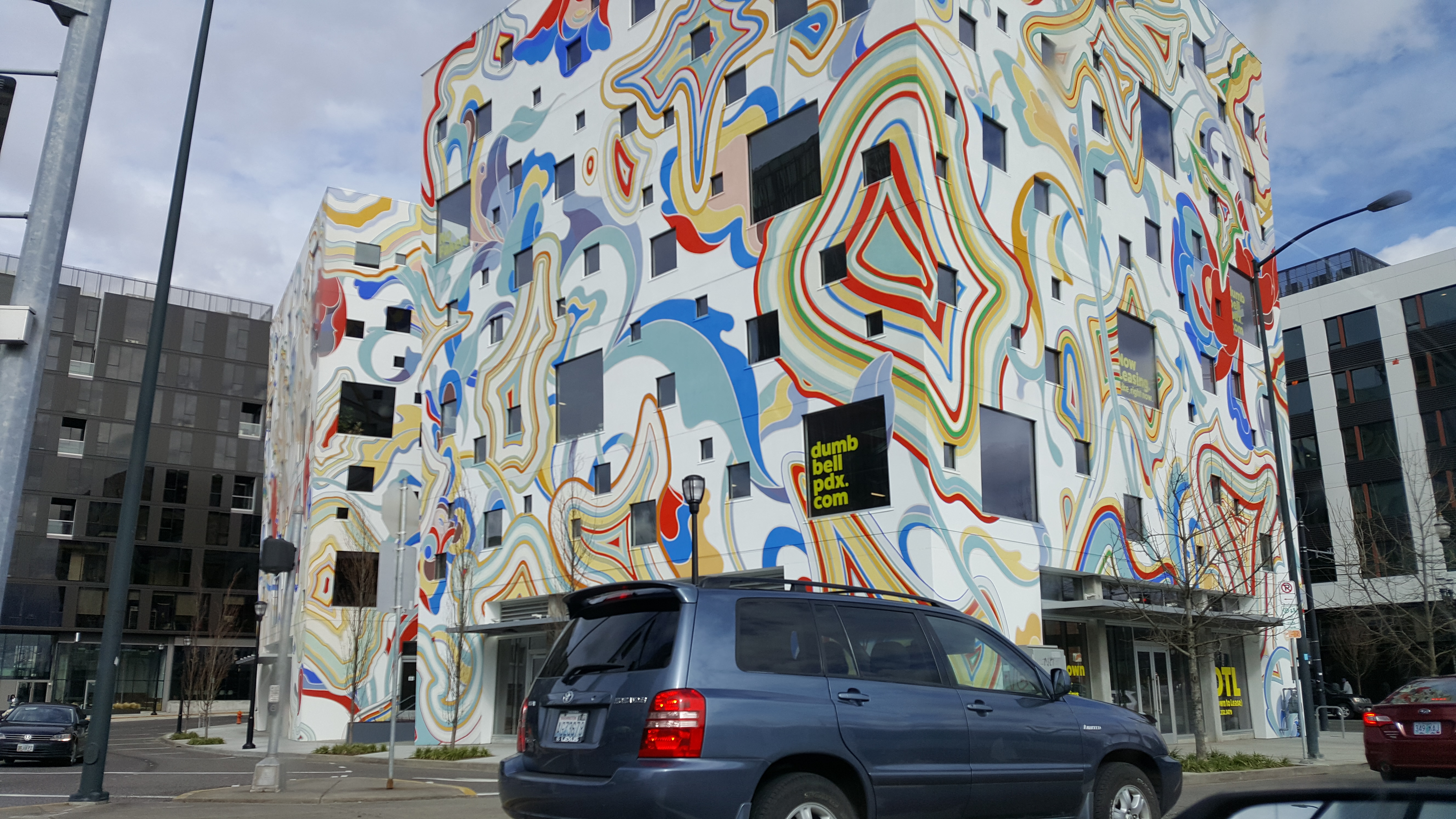
Exterior in 2018

The Fair-Haired Dumbbell is a building located at 11 Northeast Martin Luther King Jr. Blvd., in Portland, Oregon's Burnside Bridgehead project in the Kerns neighborhood, United States. Its exterior design was created by Los Angeles artist James Jean, and was selected by the Regional Arts & Culture Council, the city, and Guerrilla Development. Dan Cohen painted the artwork in June 2017.

== See also ==
- Kevin Cavenaugh
