= Club 21 (Portland, Oregon) =

- Interactive map of Club 21
- Address: 2035 Northeast Glisan Street
- Location: Portland, Oregon, U.S.
- Coordinates: 45.526744°N 122.644692°W

Construction
- Closed: January 15, 2017

Club 21 was a dive bar located in the Kerns neighborhood, in northeast Portland, Oregon.

== History ==
The bar was housed in a "castle-shaped" building constructed as a Russian Orthodox church during the 1930s. Late 2016 plans to relocate the building were abandoned because it was deemed structurally unsound. Club 21, which opened in the late 1960s, closed on January 15, 2017.
