= Grits n' Gravy =

Defunct restaurant in Portland, Oregon, U.S.

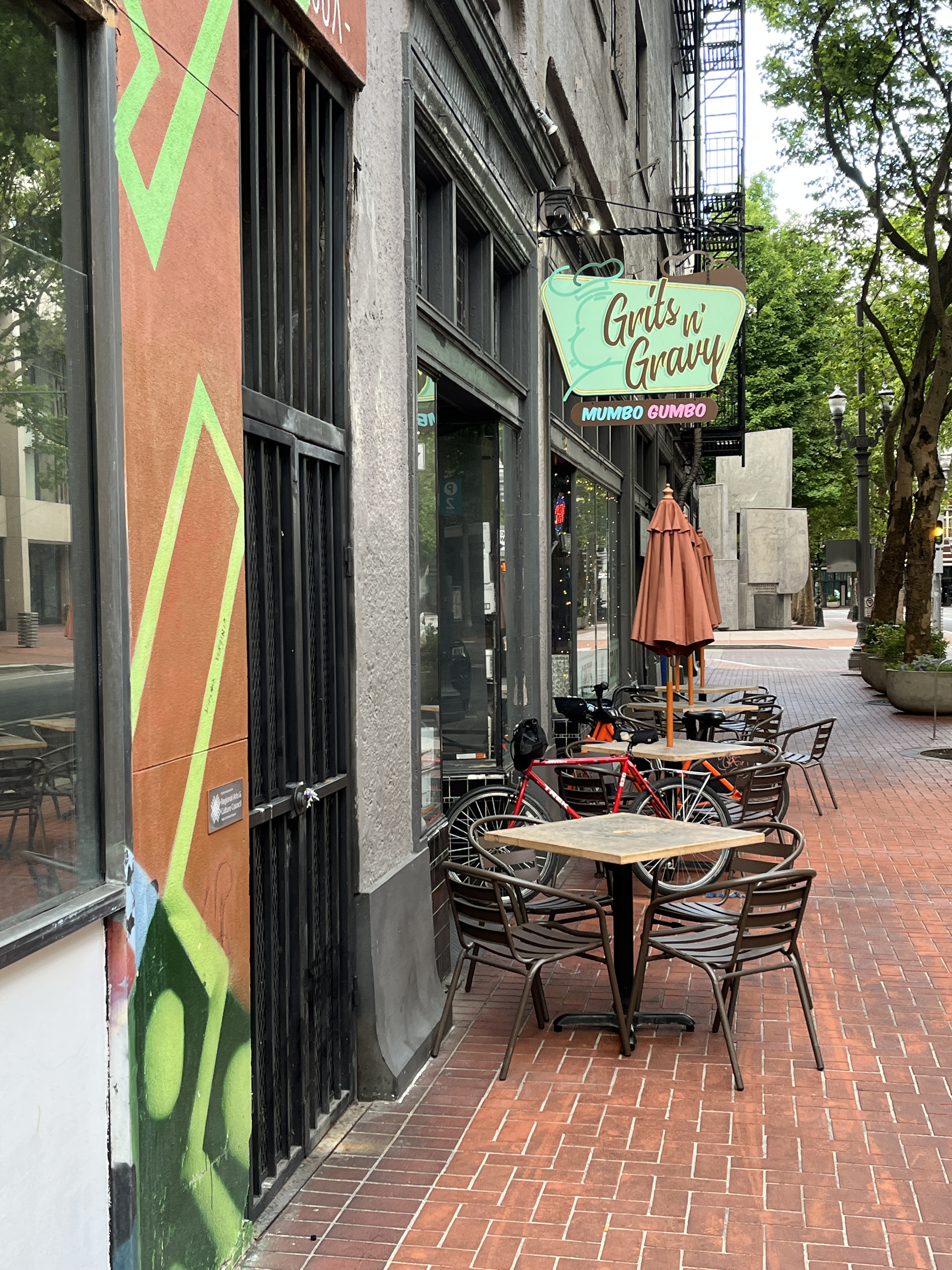
- The restaurant's exterior, 2023
- Interactive map of Grits n' Gravy

Restaurant information
- Established: December 2021
- Owner: Jesús Alejandro Chipres
- Previous owner: Brandon Stevens
- Food type: Southern
- Location: 215 Southwest 6th Avenue, Portland, Multnomah, Oregon, 97204, United States
- Coordinates: 45.5222°N 122.6773°W

Grits n' Gravy is a Southern restaurant in Portland, Oregon, United States. Chef Brandon Stevens opened the restaurant in December 2021, in the space that previously housed Little Bird Bistro. The restaurant closed in June 2026, but reopened under new ownership in October 2026.

== Description ==
Grits n' Gravy is a diner serving traditional Southern-style comfort food in downtown Portland. Eater Portland said the restaurant "harkens back to the old-school breakfast haunts with dozens of omelets and every possible permutation of eggs, meat, and potatoes". Grits n' Gravy has displayed works by local artists and provided food from other businesses, especially local Black-owned ones.

=== Menu ===
The menu has included chicken-fried steak and pork chops, French toast with powdered sugar, grits as well as sausage patties, biscuits, and rice, with four different types of gravy (including country-style white, onion, "redeye", and sausage varieties). One version of shrimp and grits ("Downtown") has bacon and cheese, and another ("Uptown") has andouille, white wine, and a Cajun cream sauce. The Country Boy Breakfast includes an 8-ounce pork sausage patty, two buttermilk biscuits with gravy, three eggs, and grits. The drink menu includes bottomless sweet tea.

== History ==
Chef Brandon Stevens opened Grits n' Gravy in December 2021, in the space that previously housed Little Bird Bistro. He based the menu on one operated by his grandfather in the Sacramento area during the 1970s. This was his first brick and mortar restaurant, having previously operated the food cart Mumbo Gumbo.

Grits n' Gravy partnered with Black Restaurant Week in 2023 and 2024. The restaurant closed in June 2026, but reopened in October with Jesús Alejandro Chipres as owner. Some of the original restaurant's employees returned and the Southern-inspired menu was kept.

== Reception ==
In 2022, Andi Prewitt of Willamette Week wrote, "every single Southern breakfast staple on the sizable menu will not only fill you up for the better part of a day; you'll leave satisfied and half convinced you somehow strolled to Louisiana for your meal". Michael Russell and Lizzy Acker included Grits n' Gravy in The Oregonian's list of the ten best new brunches of 2023.

Zoe Baillargeon and Janey Wong included Grits n' Gravy in Eater Portland's 2023 overview of "where to find a real-deal breakfast" in the city. The website's 2024 list of the city's "killer" Southern eateries recommended both varieties of shrimp and grits, as well as "something with gravy".

== See also ==
- List of Black-owned restaurants
- List of diners
- List of Southern restaurants
