= Kevin Cavenaugh =

American business executive

- Born: Kevin A. Cavenaugh; May 2, 1967 (age 59); Alameda County, California, California, U.S.
- Occupations: Real estate developer, designer
- Years active: 2001–present

Kevin A. Cavenaugh (born May 2, 1967) is a real estate developer and designer from Portland, Oregon, and the owner of Guerrilla Development.

== Early life and education ==
Cavenaugh is from California. He studied architecture at the University of California, Berkeley, and was a Loeb fellow at Harvard University's Graduate School of Design.

== Career ==
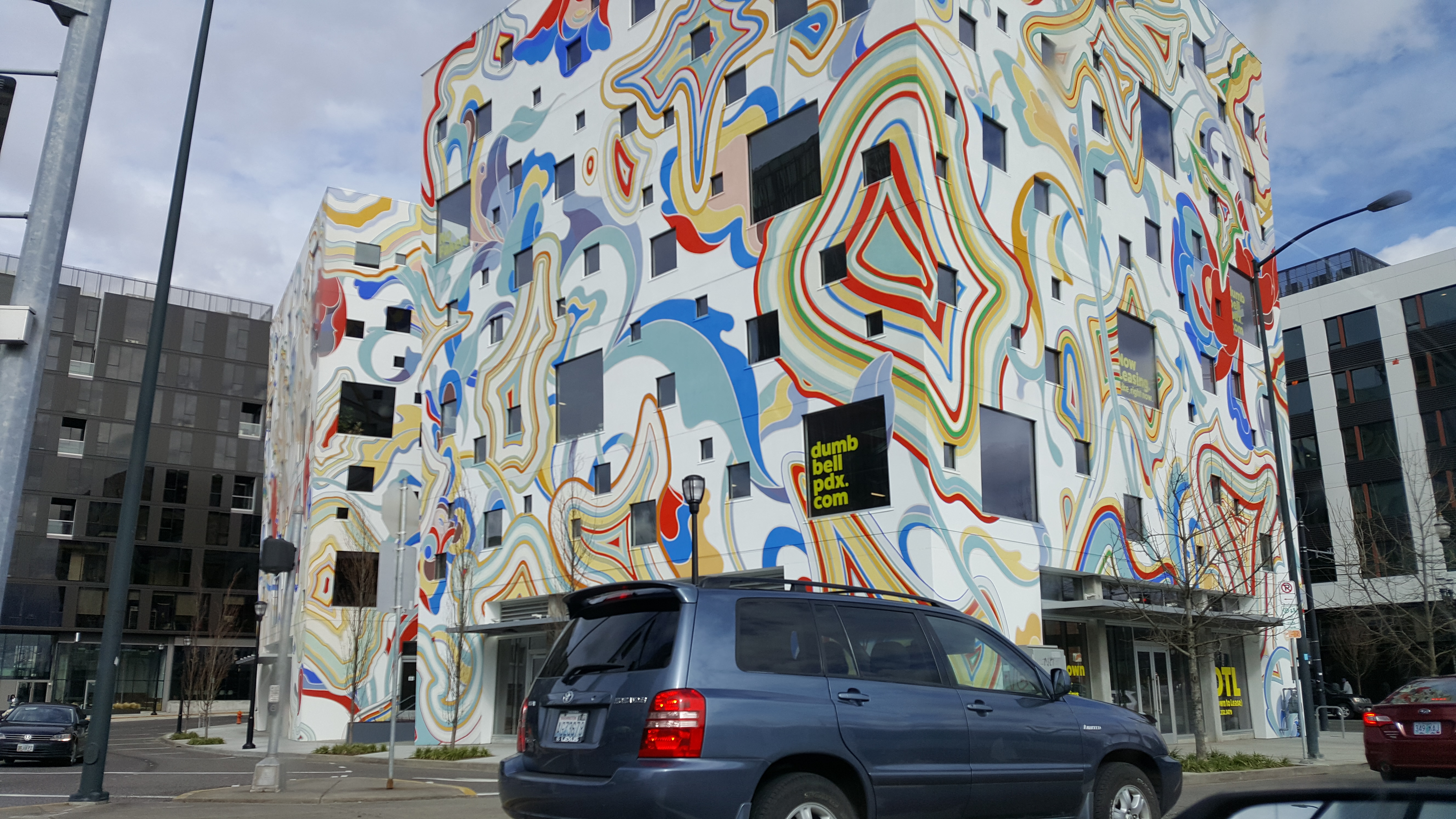
Exterior of the Fair-Haired Dumbbell

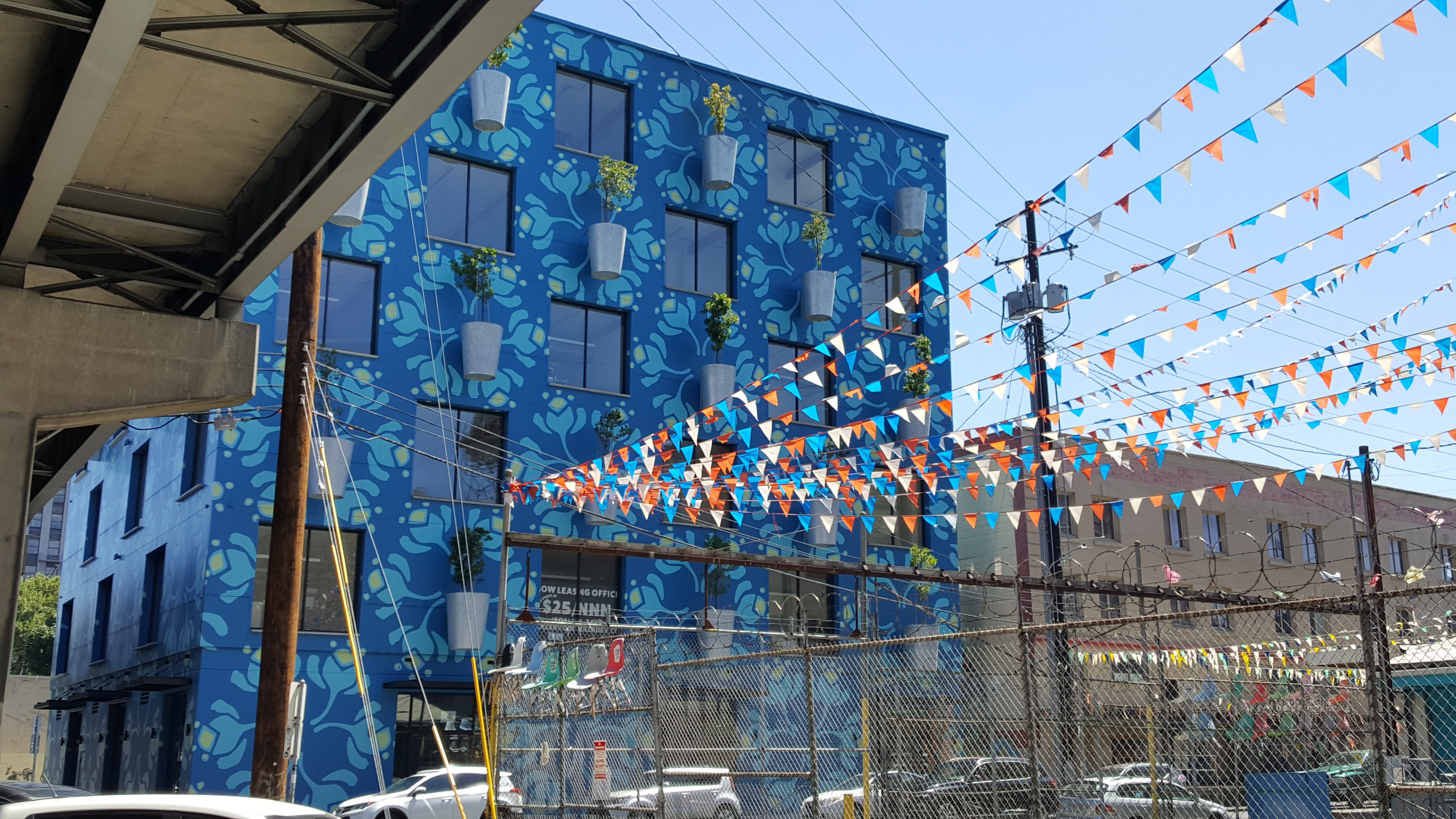
Tree Farm, 2020

Cavenaugh is a real estate developer and designer, and the founder and owner of Guerrilla Development. He became a developer in 2001, and was an intern with Fletcher Farr Ayotte, as of 2004. Cavenaugh is known for his views on affordable housing, displacement, and gentrification. His projects have included:

- Atomic Orchard Experiment
- Box & One Lofts
- Burnside Rocket
- "Dr. Jim's Still Really Nice"
- Fair-Haired Dumbbell
- "Jolene's First Cousin"
- "The Ocean"
- Pub at the End of the Universe
- "Rig-a-Hut"
- Standard Dairy building
- Tree Farm
- Two-Thirds (8735 North Lombard Street)
- The Zipper

In 2018, Cavenaugh and his five colleagues at Guerrilla all received the same compensation for one year, regardless of position or length of employment, to "[equalize] the boss to employee ratio" and eliminate any possible gender pay gap.

Two of Cavenaugh's projects, Jolene's First Cousin and Atomic Orchard Experiment, will have units reserved for homeless people and social workers.

== Personal life ==
After working for Peace Corps in Gabon, he relocated to Portland, Oregon during the 1990s.

Cavenaugh and his wife live in Portland with their three children, as of 2016.
