= Sunshine Dairy =

Sunshine Dairy Foods, Inc.
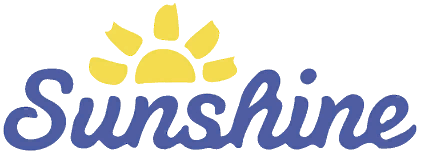

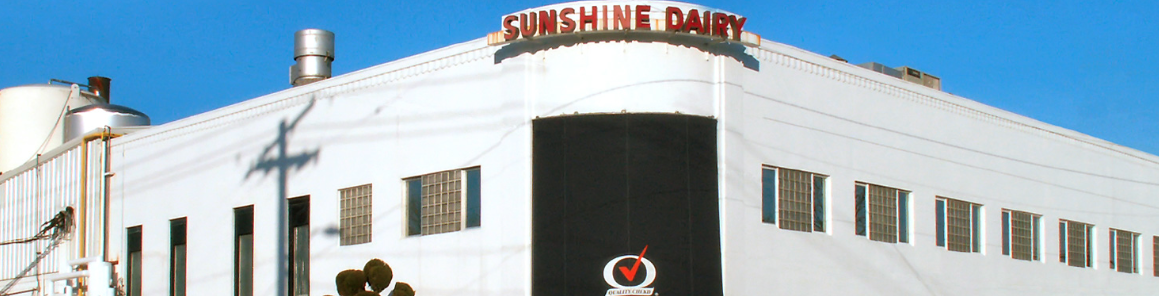
- Sunshine Dairy plant in northeast Portland, Oregon
- Industry: Dairy
- Founded: 1936; 89 years ago
- Founder: John Karamanos
- Headquarters: Portland, Oregon; United States
- Area served: Pacific Northwest
- Products: Milk, organic milk, buttermilk, sour cream, chocolate milk, drinking chocolate, cottage cheese, whipping cream, creamer, yogurts, plant based products

Sunshine Dairy was a dairy manufacturer and supplier in the Kerns neighborhood of Portland, Oregon, United States. The company was founded in 1936. As well as a full line of dairy products, the company produced plant based yogurts at its processing facility on Northeast 84th Avenue and Halsey Street in Portland.

== History ==
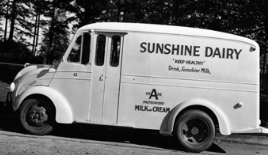
Sunshine Dairy delivery truck

Sunshine Dairy Foods was founded in 1936 by John Karamanos, who originally began the dairy delivery service for his friends working in Portland's food industry. There were 50 independent dairy processors in the city at the time.

In 1994, customers began asking Sunshine numerous growth hormone-related questions when the U.S. Food & Drug Administration approved the use of Bovine Somatotropin (rBST) that year. In 2001, Sunshine Dairy became the first dairy in the area to buy only rBST-free milk.

Sunshine's largest vendor was the Oregon Milk Marketing Federation (OMMF). OMMF members are almost universally family farmers who manage small- to mid-sized farms in the Willamette Valley of Oregon and the Yakima Valley and Chehalis in Washington.

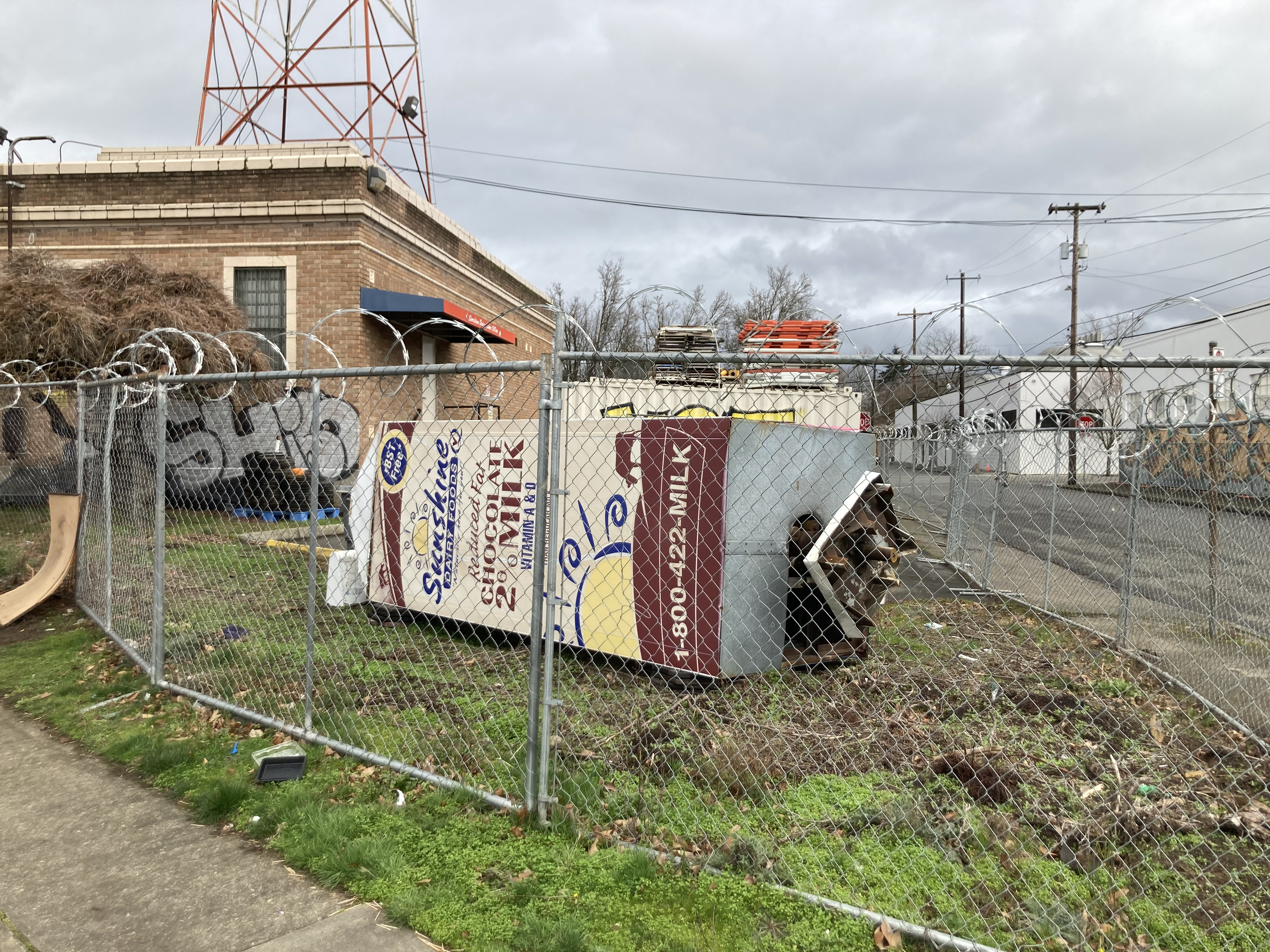
Rotating milk carton, formerly on top of building, on ground during redevelopment

In May 2018, Sunshine filed for bankruptcy and announced the closing of its main site on NE 21st Avenue in Northeast Portland, with competitor Alpenrose Dairy due to take over the property. In February 2019, it was announced that the site had been acquired by Portland-based NBP Capital LLC with plans to redevelop Sunshine Dairy site and replace it with a mixed-use project.
