= Tight Tacos =

Restaurant chain in the United States

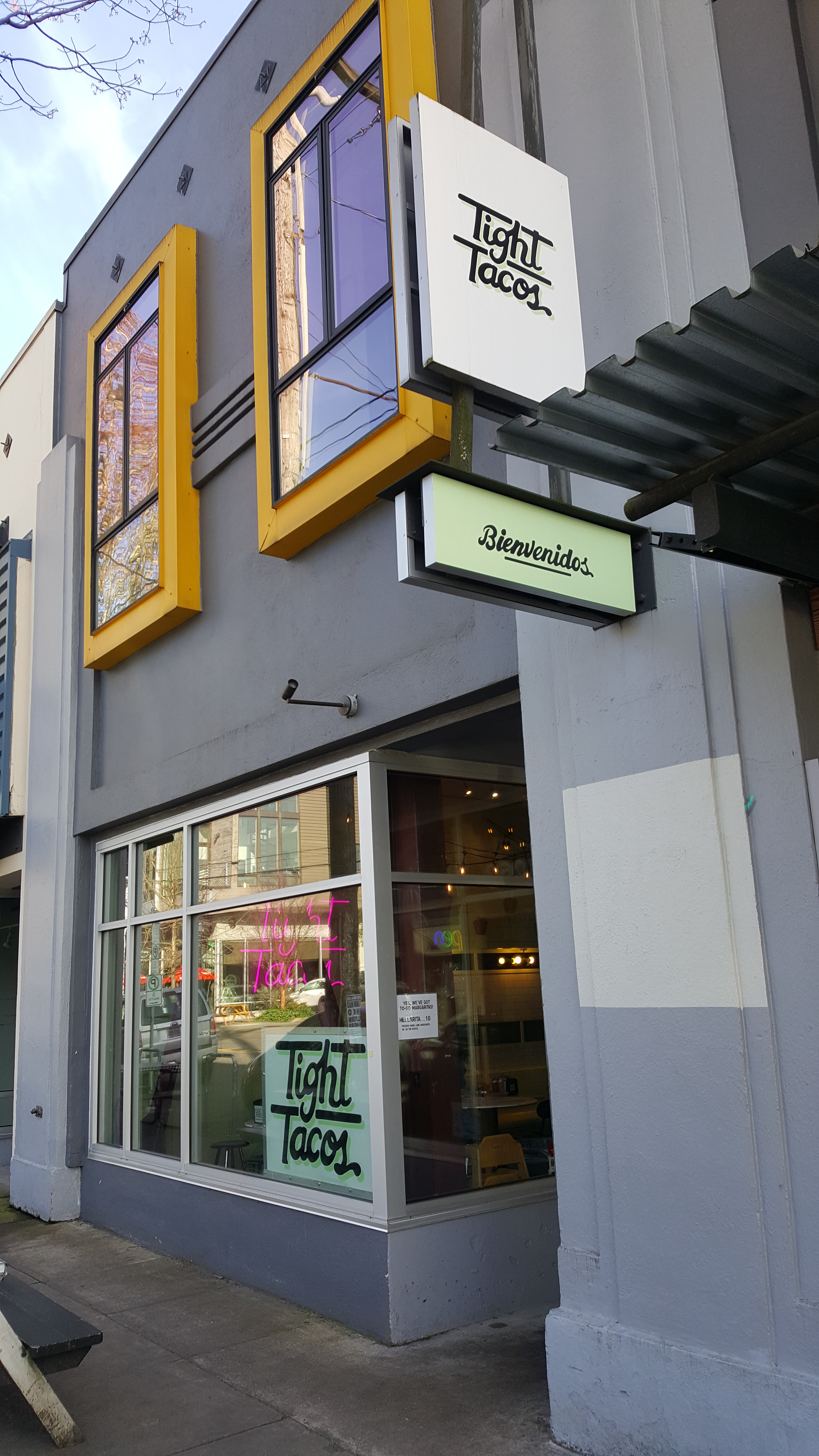
- Exterior of Tight Tacos in southeast Portland's Richmond neighborhood in March 2022

Restaurant information
- Established: 2016
- Owners: Mark Cosio; Annamarie Cosio
- Food type: Mexican
- Website: tighttacos.com

Tight Tacos is a small chain of Mexican restaurants based in Portland, Oregon, United States. Established in 2016, the business has also operated in Hawaii. Tight Tacos has garnered a positive reception.

== Description ==
The restaurant chain and catering company Tight Tacos operates in the U.S. states of Oregon and Hawaii. In addition to tacos, the business serves nachos with cheese, guacamole, jalapenos, and salsa fresca, as well as burritos. Meatless fillings include adobo-marinated cauliflower and soy chorizo. The Hellaburrito—stylized as Hella(bur)Rito—has cream, French fries, nacho cheese, and onions. Drink options include micheladas made with hard seltzers (Truly, White Claw), as well as agua fresca, horchata, and sodas.

== History and locations ==
Co-owner Mark Cosio launched Tight Tacos with his brother-in-law Reggie Ballesteros in 2016. Annamarie Cosio has also been credited as a co-owner.

By 2019, the business operated four food carts. Tight Tacos's first brick and mortar restaurant opened in The Zipper in Portland in September 2019. In early 2020, Tight Tacos began operating in the kitchen of Thirsty Monk in southeast Portland. The business operated via delivery and take-out at times during the COVID-19 pandemic.

Tight Tacos has also operated on Division Street in southeast Portland's Richmond neighborhood, and in Maui and Oahu. The Portland food cart in a southeast Portland parking lot hosted the breakfast burrito pop-up Kooks Burritos.

== Reception ==
Tight Tacos's Hellarito was included in the Daily Hive's 2021 list of the fifteen best eateries in Portland. Michael Russell included the business in The Oregonian's list of Portland's best new food carts of the past decade. Waz Wu recommended Tight Tacos in Eater Portland's 2023 overview of the city's vegan tacos.

In 2020, during the COVID-19 pandemic, Willamette Week's Matthew Singer included Tight Tacos in a list of twenty "awesome meals for takeout and delivery in Portland right now". The business was a runner-up in the Best Taco category of the newspaper's annual 'Best of Portland' readers' poll in 2022, and ranked second in the Best Catering Service category in the same poll in 2024.

== See also ==
- Hispanics and Latinos in Portland, Oregon
- List of Mexican restaurants
- List of restaurant chains in the United States
- List of restaurants in Hawaii
