= Beaverton Bakery =

Defunct bakery in Beaverton, Oregon, U.S.

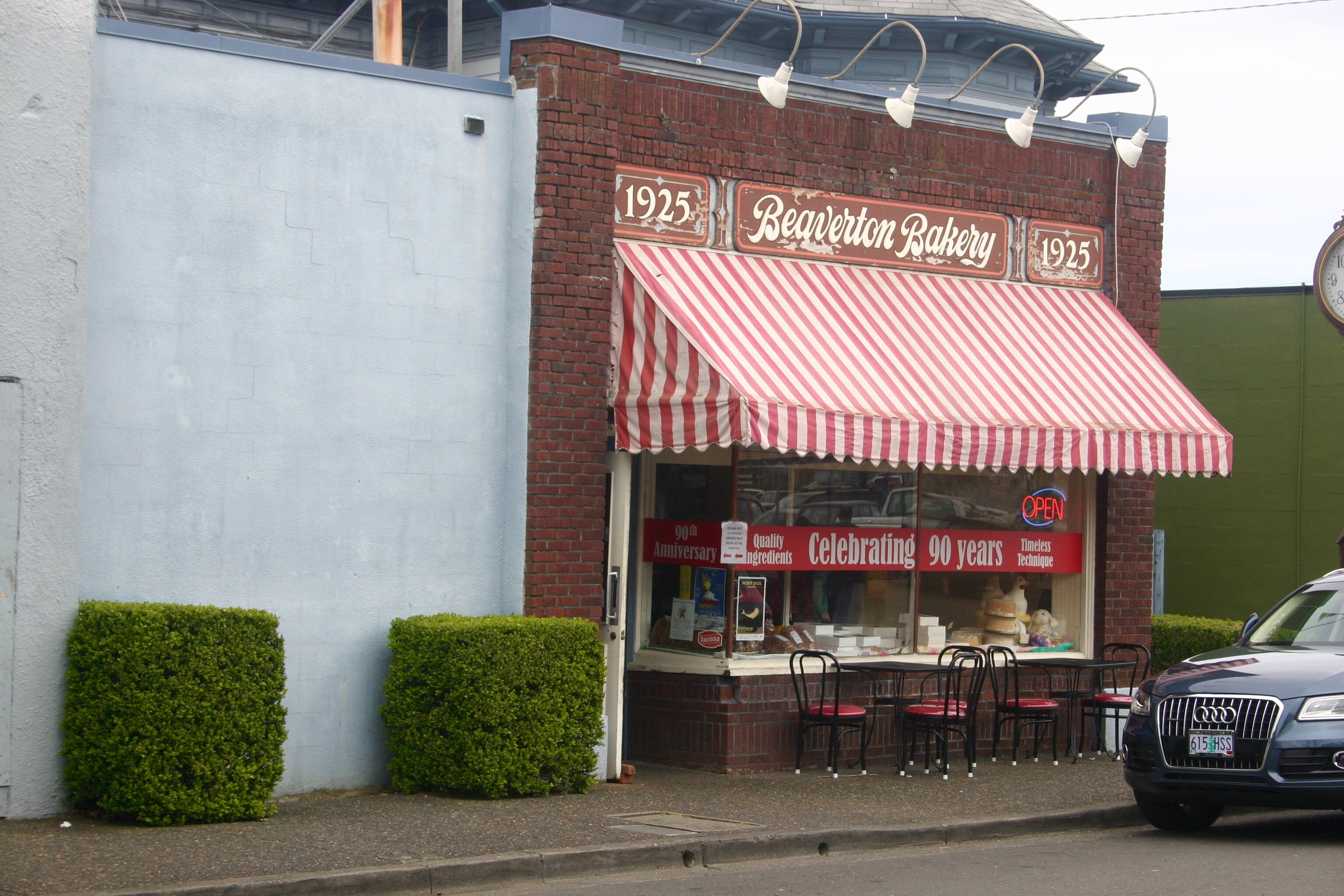
- The bakery's exterior in 2016
- Interactive map of Beaverton Bakery

Restaurant information
- Established: 1925
- Closed: 2018
- Food type: Bakery
- Location: 12375 SW Broadway St, Beaverton, Washington, Oregon, 97005, United States
- Coordinates: 45°29′15.7″N 122°48′12.1″W

Beaverton Bakery was a bakery in Beaverton, Oregon, United States. The business was started by Charles Yeager in 1925. The business was well known locally for their wedding cakes and donuts along with a variety of other baked goods. It closed in 2018, after operating for 93 years.

== History ==
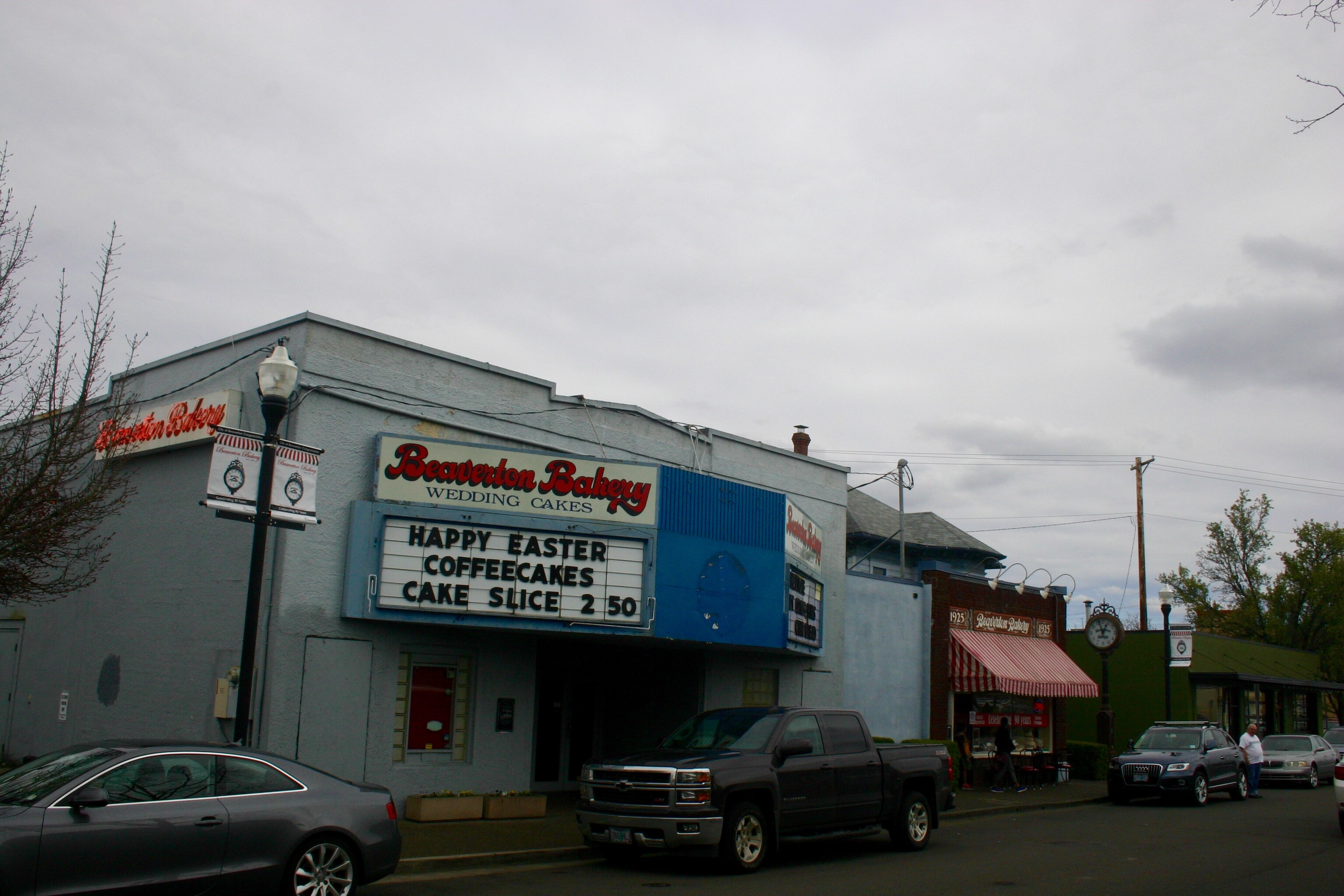
Exterior, 2016

Beaverton Bakery occupied a three building site on Broadway in downtown Beaverton. The origins of the location can be traced back to 1887 when Francis Marion Robinson, Beaverton's first doctor, built the original structure as his home. Dr. Robinson added a pharmacy to the house in 1893, which was the same year that Beaverton was incorporated as a city. Both buildings eventually came to house the business.

Charles Yeager opened a bakery in Robinson's former home in 1925 and expanded it to include the two adjacent buildings. Charles Schubert began working as a baker there in 1952 at the age of 19 and purchased it from Yeager in 1965. After retirement, his daughter Carrie Schubert took over the role of president and manager of Beaverton Bakery.

Robert F. Kennedy visited the bakery in 1968 while campaigning in Oregon for a primary presidential election. He was served a maple bar, which he reportedly liked. A clock designed by Joseph Mayer was built between 1912 and 1915 and placed at the site of the bakery in 1983.

Beaverton Bakery at one point operated three satellite locations in Lake Oswego, the Portland International Airport, as well as another storefront in Beaverton. All three were eventually shut down prior to the closing of the original Beaverton location.

In February 2017, Beaverton Bakery closed for four days due to a rat infestation in the building that was discovered by health inspectors. The bakery released a statement apologizing for the conditions, citing the age of the building as well as a recent flood as probable causes. The Oregon Department of Agriculture stated that although rat infestations are relatively routine, it is much less common to have an active infestation that is significant enough to warrant the closure of a bakery for four days.

Beaverton Bakery officially closed its doors on September 27, 2018, having released a statement addressed to the community the day prior. There was a considerable local response to the closure including people rushing to get the last of the baked goods, as well as a statement from the then Mayor of Beaverton, Denny Doyle.

== See also ==
- List of bakeries
