= Christopher McKnight Nichols =

American historian

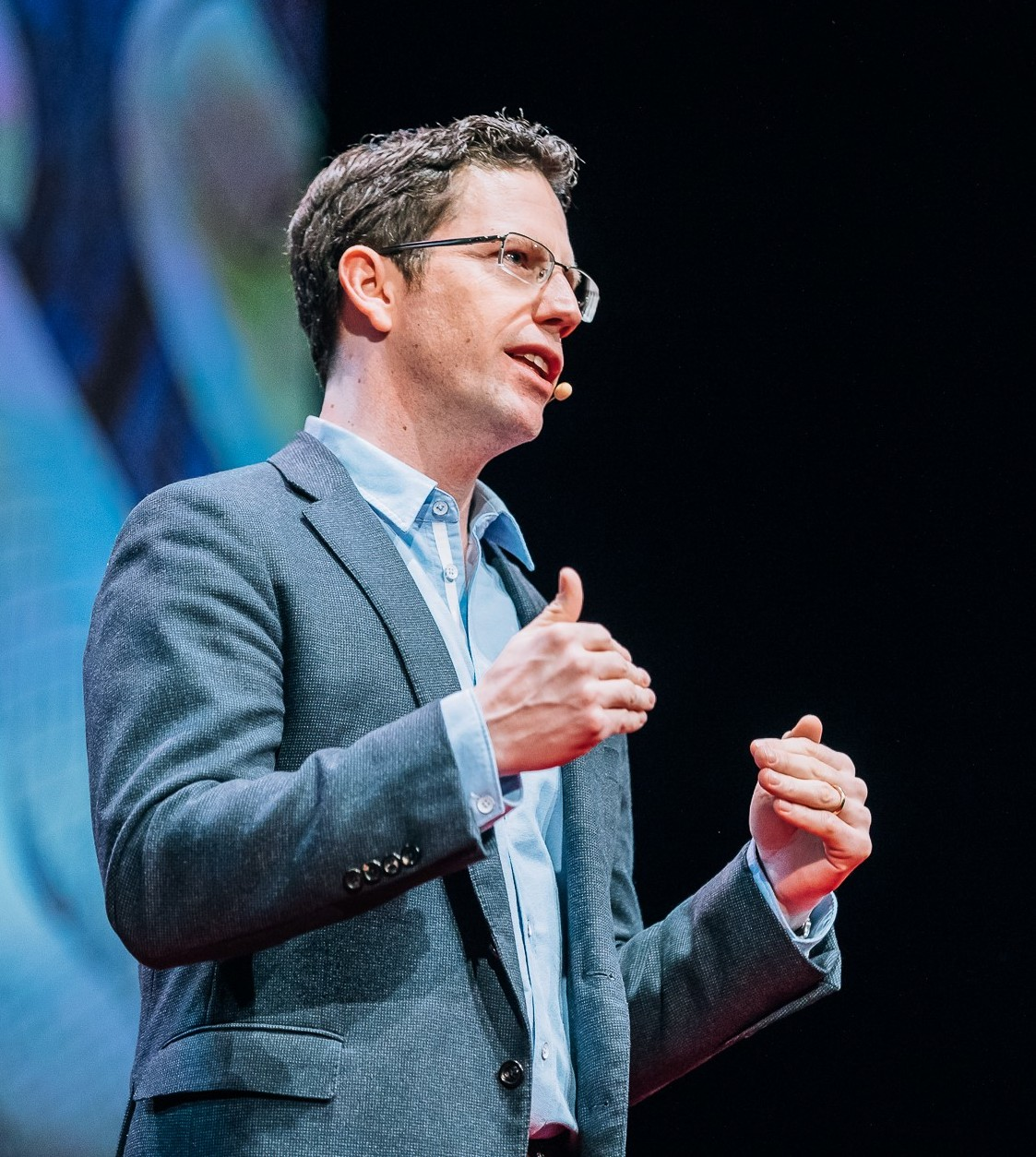
- Born: New York City, New York
- Awards: Andrew Carnegie Fellowship (2017)

Academic background
- Education: Harvard University; Wesleyan University; University of Virginia (PhD, 2008)

Academic work
- Discipline: History
- Sub-discipline: American history
- Institutions: University of Virginia; University of Pennsylvania; Oregon State University; Ohio State University (2022-Present)
- Main interests: History of American foreign relations, Intellectual History, Gilded Age through the Progressive Era
- Notable works: Rethinking American Grand Strategy (2021), Promise and Peril (2011), Prophesies of Godlessness (2008)
- Website: Official website

Christopher McKnight Nichols is an American historian. He is the Wayne Woodrow Hayes Chair in National Security Studies and Professor of History at The Ohio State University.

== Career ==
Originally from New York City, New York, Nichols was educated at Harvard University, Wesleyan University, and the University of Virginia, where he received his PhD in history in 2008. He previously taught at the University of Virginia, where he was a fellow at the Institute for Advanced Studies in Culture, and at the University of Pennsylvania, where he was an Andrew W. Mellon Postdoctoral Fellow.

In 2014, he launched the Citizenship and Crisis Initiative at Oregon State University with an emphasis on issues at the intersection of citizenship, crisis, politics, international relations, civics, and engaged democracy, along with the centenary of World War I.

== Research ==
Nichols’ research focuses on the intellectual history of the United States’ role in the world from the Civil War period to the present, with an emphasis on isolationism, internationalism, and globalization. He is also a specialist on American political history and the intellectual and cultural history of the Gilded Age and Progressive Era (1880-1920) through the present. Nichols is an advocate for the importance of history and the humanities in education and as a way to understand and address some of the most urgent contemporary problems.

Nichols also has researched, written, and presented extensively on the 1918 flu pandemic, including publishing a roundtable in the Journal of the Gilded Age and Progressive Era (2020) and doing a series of talks, including a presentation for C-SPAN to the Center for Presidential History at Southern Methodist University (2020).

== Publications ==
Nichols is the author or editor of six books including:

- Ideologies and U.S. Foreign Relations: New Histories, edited with David Milne (Winter 2021/22);
- Rethinking American Grand Strategy, edited with Elizabeth Borgwardt and Andrew Preston (2021); Rethinking American Grand Strategy
- Wiley Blackwell Companion to the Gilded Age and Progressive Era, edited with Nancy C. Unger (2017); A Companion to the Gilded Age and Progressive Era | Wiley
- Oxford Encyclopedia of American Military and Diplomatic History, with David Milne and Timothy Lynch (2013); The Oxford Encyclopedia of American Military and Diplomatic History: 2-Volume Set
- Promise and Peril: America at the Dawn of a Global Age (2011, 2015) Promise and Peril — Christopher McKnight Nichols
- Prophesies of Godlessness: Predictions of America's Imminent Secularization from the Puritans to the Present Day, edited with Charles Mathewes (2008). Prophesies of Godlessness: Predictions of America's Imminent Secularization from the Puritans to the Present Day
