= Le Pigeon =

Restaurant in Portland, Oregon, U.S.

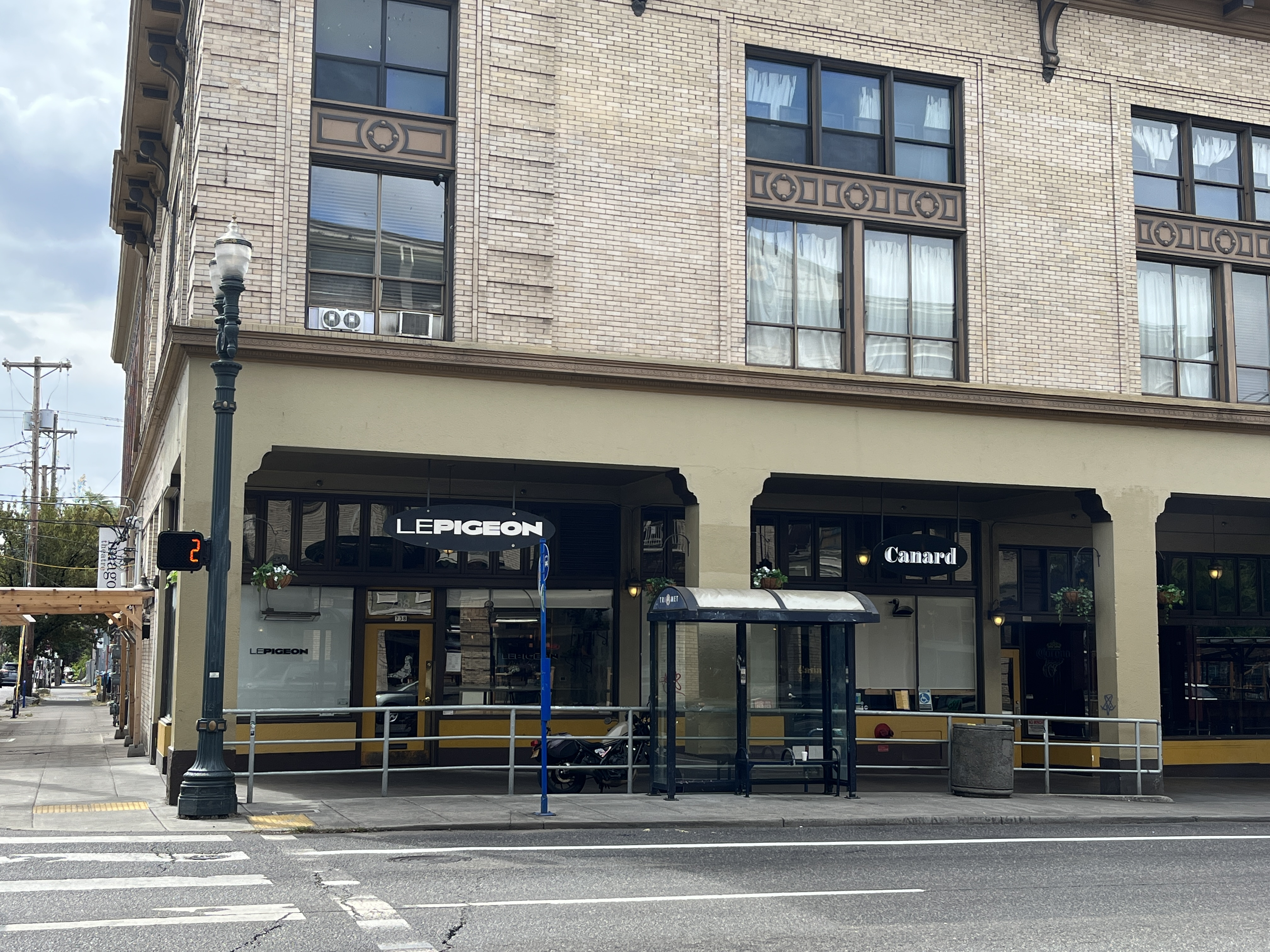
- The restaurant's exterior, 2022
- Interactive map of Le Pigeon

Restaurant information
- Established: 2006
- Location: 738 East Burnside Street, Portland, Oregon, 97214, United States
- Coordinates: 45.52282°N 122.65783°W
- Website: lepigeon.com

Le Pigeon is a French bistro in Portland, Oregon's Buckman neighborhood, in the United States.

== History ==
Le Pigeon was previously known as Colleen's Bistro. Head chef Gabriel Rucker invested in the restaurant and became a partner by 2007, renaming it to Le Pigeon. Andrew Fortgang is a co-owner.

American chef Andrew Zimmern visited for an episode of the Travel Channel series The Zimmern List.

In 2026, Le Pigeon was among local restaurants, community organizations, and other businesses that joined the "We Are Rip City" campaign in support of the Moda Center renovation project.

== Reception ==
Brooke Jackson-Glidden included the foie gras profiteroles in Eater Portland's 2024 overview of "iconic" Portland dishes. Katrina Yentch included Le Pigeon in the website's 2025 overview of the best restaurants in Buckman. Rebecca Roland included the foie gras profiteroles in Eater Portland's 2025 overview of the city's eleven best restaurants for desserts.

The business was also included in The Infatuation's 2024 list of Portland's best restaurants. Le Pigeon ranked second and won in the Best French Restaurant category of Willamette Week's annual 'Best of Portland' readers' poll in 2022 and 2024, respectively. Michael Russell included the business in The Oregonian's 2025 list of the 21 best restaurants in southeast Portland. He also ranked Le Pigeon number 17 in the newspaper's 2025 list of Portland's 40 best restaurants. Hannah Wallace included the business in Condé Nast Traveler's 2025 list of Portland's 23 best restaurants. The business was included in Portland Monthly's 2025 list of 25 restaurants "that made Portland". Writers for Portland Monthly included the foie gras profiteroles in a 2025 list of the city's "most iconic" dishes.

== See also ==
- Canard (restaurant)
- James Beard Foundation Award: 2010s
- List of French restaurants
