= Ben's Friends =

American non-profit organization

Ben's Friends is an American non-profit organization that serves people with rare diseases. It was founded in 2007 by Ben Munoz and Scott Orn and was granted 501(c)(3) nonprofit status on February 9, 2014. It is headquartered in Austin, Texas.

Ben's Friends runs over 30 online communities, each focused on a specific rare disease or chronic illness. Its mission is to provide patients living with rare diseases or chronic illnesses, as well as their caregivers, family, and friends, a place to connect with others. Ben's Friends communities are managed by approximately 100 volunteer moderators, most of whom are patients themselves. The organization was founded in 2007 by Ben Munoz and Scott Orn during Munoz's recovery from a rare brain aneurysm caused by an arteriovenous malformation (AVM). In early 2008, Munoz and Orn started two more communities, Living With Ataxia and Living With Trigeminal Neuralgia. Ben's Friends has served over 50,000 members, with more than 100,000 online visitors to the communities each month.

A few of the larger Ben's Friends communities:

- AVM
- Trigeminal neuralgia
- Ataxia International
- Adrenoleukodystrophy (ALD)
- Fibromyalgia
- Brain aneurysm
