= Tree Farm (building) =

Building in Portland, Oregon, U.S.

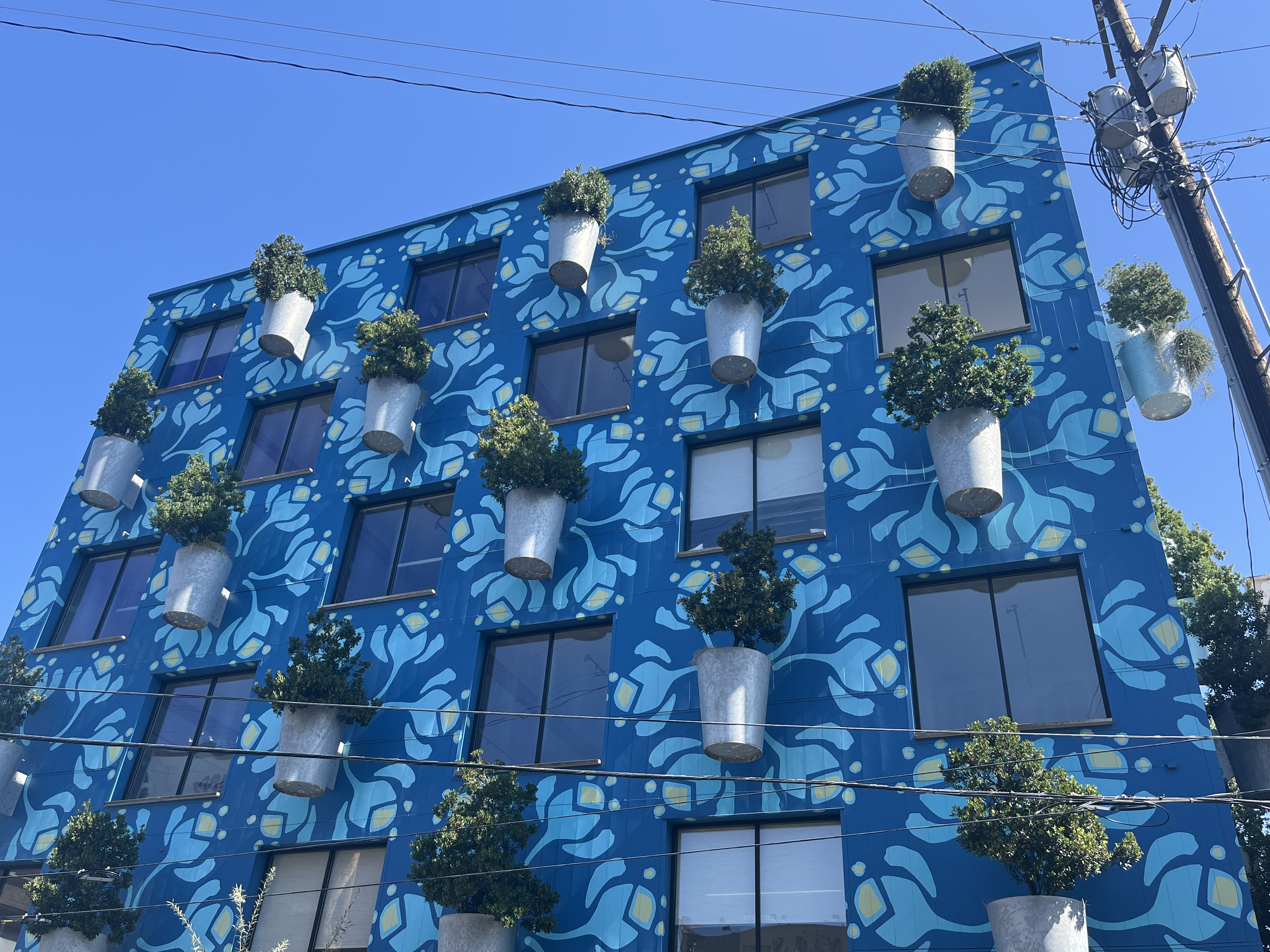
- The building's exterior in 2025

- Location within Portland, Oregon

General information
- Location: Portland, Oregon, United States
- Coordinates: 45.51704°N 122.66247°W

Design and construction
- Architecture firm: Brett Schulz Architects
- Developer: Guerrilla Development
- Main contractor: Pro-Teck Construction

The Tree Farm, or Tree Farm Building is a six-story building in Portland, Oregon's Buckman neighborhood, in the United States.

== Description and history ==
Located at Morrison and Southeast Third, the building was designed by Brett Schulz Architects; Guerrilla Development and Pro-Teck Construction served as developer and contractor, respectively. More than 50 strawberry trees are installed on the building's exterior. The project reportedly cost $12.7 million.
