= Little Bird Bistro =

Defunct restaurant in Portland, Oregon, U.S.

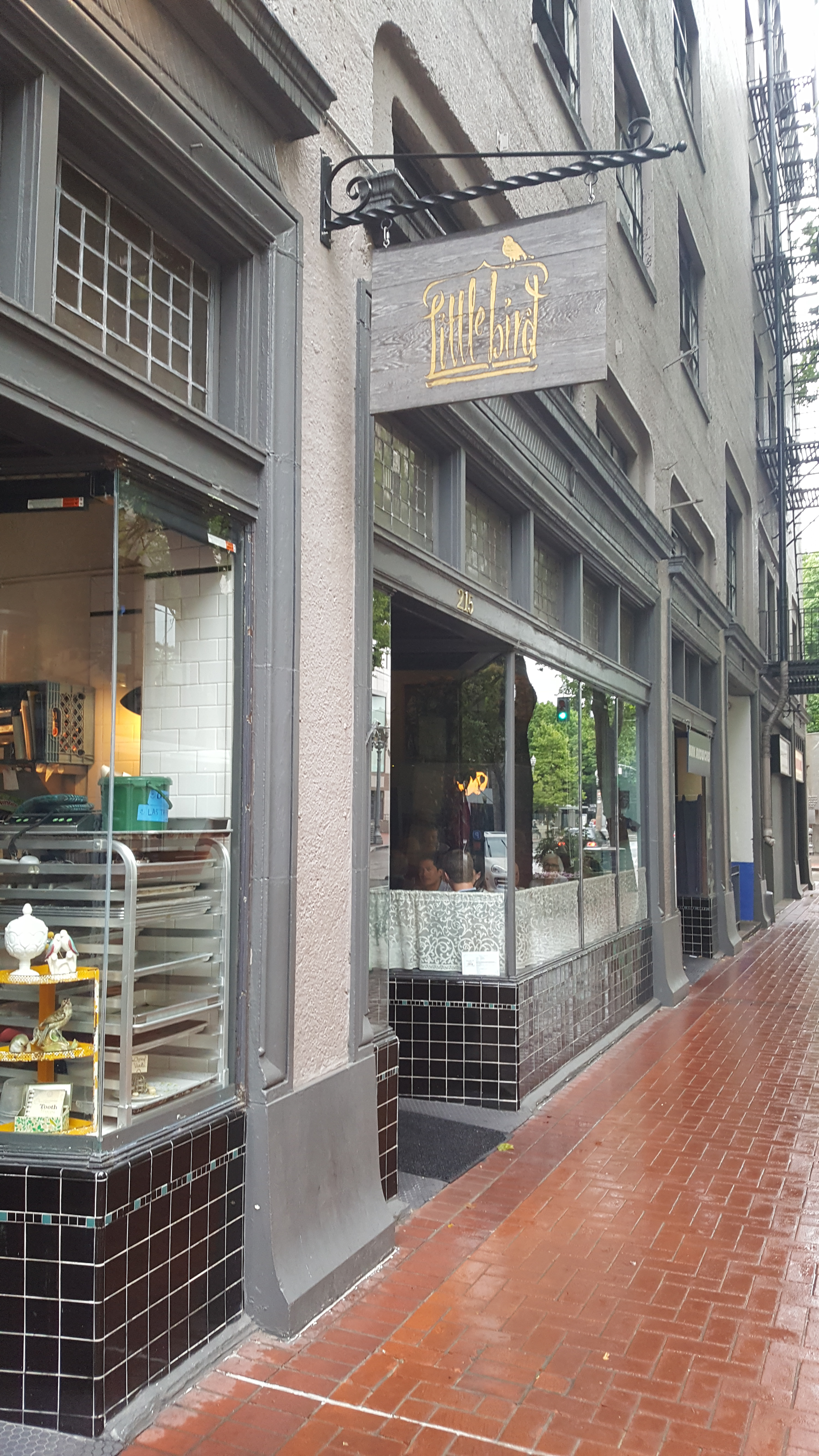
- The bistro's entrance, 2016
- Interactive map of Little Bird Bistro

Restaurant information
- Established: 2010
- Closed: October 27, 2019
- Location: 215 Southwest 6th Avenue, Portland, Multnomah, Oregon, 97204, United States
- Coordinates: 45.5222°N 122.6772°W
- Website: littlebirdbistro.com

Little Bird Bistro was a French bistro in Portland, Oregon, in the United States. The restaurant opened in 2010, and closed on October 27, 2019.

== Description and history ==
Little Bird was a French bistro in downtown Portland. It opened in 2010, and has been called Le Pigeon's "downtown sister". The Oregonian's Michael Russell described the restaurant as a "Swiss Army knife, stately enough for a business lunch, lively enough for an anniversary dinner, yet able to handle a drop-in at 10:45 p.m." The dining room was designed by Mark Annen, and featured robin egg blue walls, tall mirrors, and taxidermied birds.

In 2015, Gabriel Rucker replaced opening chef Erik Van Kley. Rucker's team of chefs included Marcelle Crooks, Andrew Gordon, and Su Lien Pino. As of 2015, Kristen Thoennes served as general manager and Andy Fortgang is Little Bird's wine director.

Little Bird Bistro closed on October 27, 2019. It was replaced by the restaurant Grits n' Gravy.

== Reception ==
In 2012, Little Bird was The Oregonian's selection for "Restaurant of the Year". In 2016, the newspaper ranked Little Bird number 16 on its list of "Portland's 101 best restaurants". The Oregonian's Michael Russell included Little Bird is his list of "Portland's most painful restaurant closures of 2019".

== See also ==
- List of French restaurants
