= Kerns, Portland, Oregon =

Kerns
- Neighborhood
- Interactive map of Kerns
- Coordinates: 45°31′35″N 122°38′38″W
- Country: United States
- State: Oregon
- City: Portland

Government
  - Association: https://kernspdx.org/
  - Coalition: https://seuplift.org/

Area
  - Total: 0.83 sq mi (2.14 km^{2})

Population (2020)
  - Total: 6,958
  - Density: 8,420/sq mi (3,250/km^{2})

Housing
  - No. of households: 4201
  - Occupancy rate: 89.6% occupied
  - Owner-occupied: 17%
  - Renting: 83%
  - Avg. household size: 1.6 persons

Kerns is a neighborhood in the inner Northeast and Southeast sections of Portland, Oregon. It borders the Lloyd District and Sullivan's Gulch neighborhoods on the north, Hollywood on the northeast, Laurelhurst on the east, Buckman and Sunnyside on the south, and (across the Willamette River) Old Town Chinatown on the west.

The Kerns neighborhood dates back to the 1850s when the area's first homesteader, William Kerns, wielded axes and saws to clear his 320-acre Donation Land Claim. Kerns earned a living making and selling wood shingles and shakes. By 1855, Kerns was elected by the local school district as its school director, and he led the effort to purchase land for Washington High School.

Kerns has a healthy mixture of commercial buildings, condos, rental housing, and single-family residences. Its streets are characterized by many trees and comfortable sidewalks. Sandy Boulevard, which follows a path that was used by Native Americans to travel from the Willamette River to the Sandy River, is a main thoroughfare in the neighborhood. Transportation to and from the neighborhood is easy by foot, bike, bus, or car.

According to the 2014 Kerns Neighborhood Street Tree Inventory, the neighborhood has 3,140 trees representing 91 different types. Parks in Kerns include Everett Community Garden (1988), Buckman Field (1920), and Oregon Park (1940).

Portland Public Schools include Benson Polytechnic High School and da Vinci Arts Middle School. Pacific Crest Community School also resides within the neighborhood.

28th Avenue's popular restaurant scene brings a great deal of business into the neighborhood. Paadee, Pambiche, and Navarre are just a few of the notable restaurants which operate on this street. Screen Door, a restaurant which has been featured on the Food Network is located nearby on East Burnside.

The neighborhood hosts the Art-Deco Laurelhurst Theater, Bond Organ Builders, which makes and refurbishes real pipe organs, and the Oregon Children's Theatre.

For many years, Sunshine Dairy operated in the Kerns neighborhood on NE 21st Avenue and Oregon Streets. Sunshine Dairy ran its sales and marketing out of the Fire Alarm Dispatch (FAD) building, which, in 1928 was constructed solely for use as a communications headquarters at NE 21st and Pacific Avenue. In May 2018, Sunshine Dairy filed for Chapter 11 bankruptcy, closing their historic location after 83 years of dairy production.

Fire Alarm Telegraph building in the Kerns neighborhood of Portland

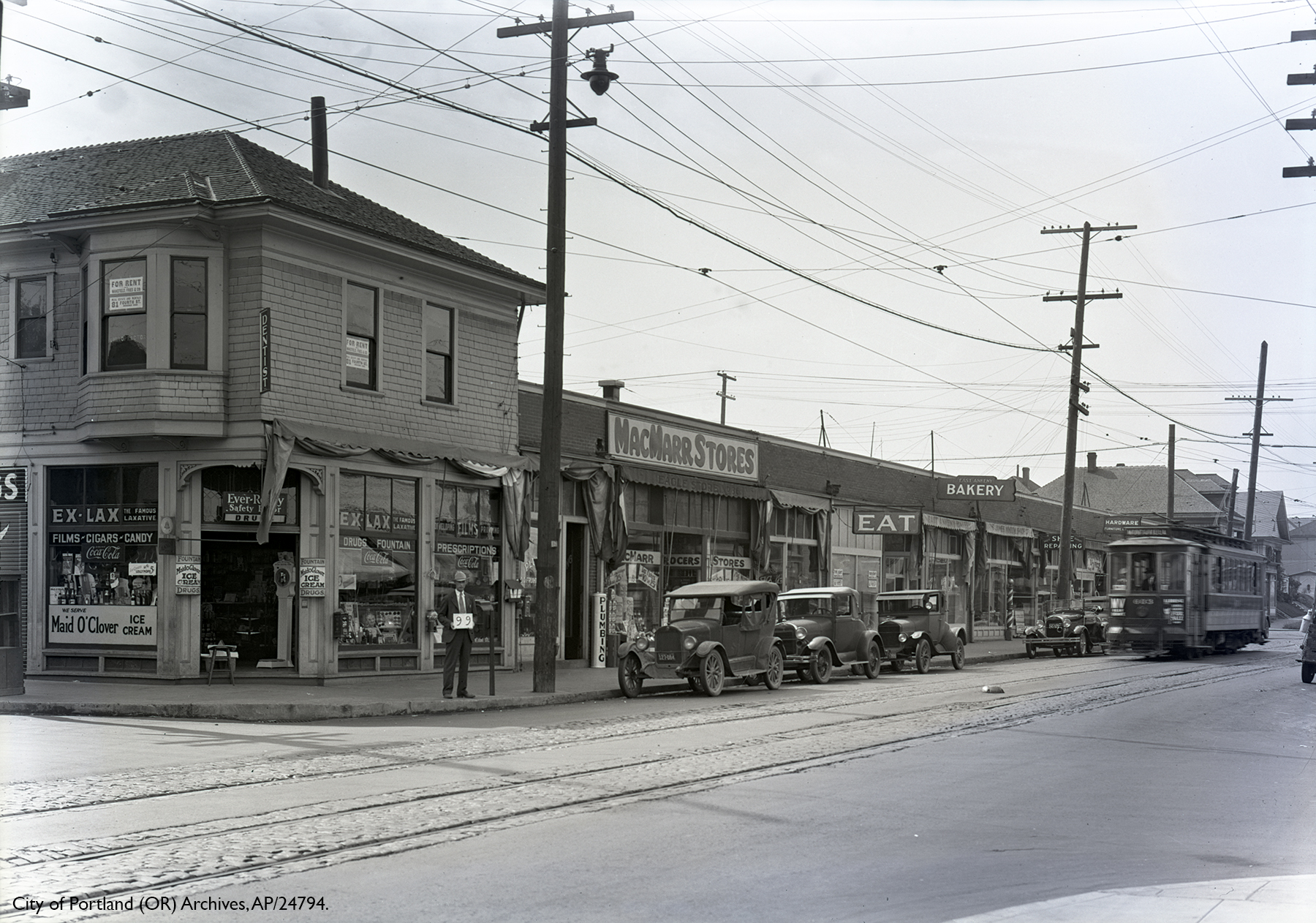
SE 28th Ave from E Burnside St on Tuesday, December 31, 1929

Starting in the 1960s, Pepsi Beverages Company operated a bottling and distribution facility on a 4.7-acre Northeast Portland tract on 2505 Northeast Pacific Street, but this location closed in the mid-2010s and was purchased by a developer in 2017. Coca-Cola operates a bottling and distribution facility on 2710 NE Davis St in a former school building.

In 2024, Time Out placed Kerns at No. 5 in its list of "The 38 Coolest Neighborhoods in the World."
