= Le Bistro Montage =

Defunct restaurant in Portland, Oregon, U.S.

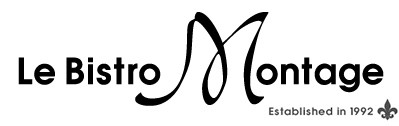

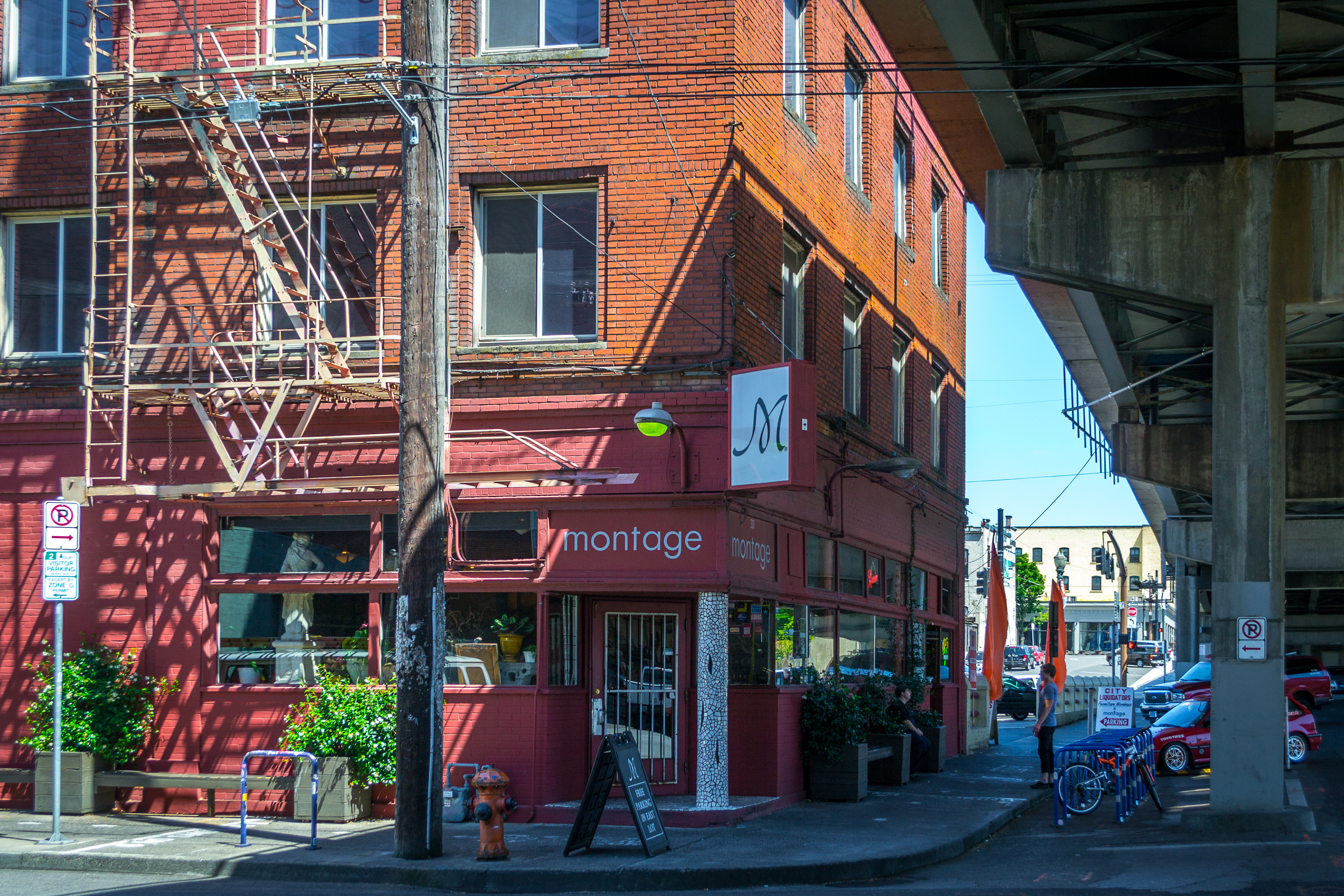
- The restaurant under the Morrison Bridge

- Location within Portland, Oregon

Restaurant information
- Closed: June 2020
- Food type: Cajun
- Location: 301 Southeast Morrison Street, Portland, Multnomah, Oregon, 97214, United States
- Coordinates: 45.51776°N 122.662654°W

Le Bistro Montage, or simply Montage, was a restaurant in Portland, Oregon, United States.

== Description and history ==
Characterized as quirky, and long a favorite of the late night crowd, it featured communal dining and eclectic Cajun fare such as alligator, frog legs, and jambalaya served late into the night. Originally on Belmont Street, it later moved to larger quarters at the site of the former Royal Hotel under the Morrison Bridge.

The restaurant closed in June 2020, during the COVID-19 pandemic. Food carts have operated as Le Bistro Montage Ala Cart at Hawthorne Asylum, Happy Valley Station, and BG's Food Cartel.

The Doug Fir Lounge has announced plans to relocate to the building which had previously housed Le Bistro Montage in 2023.

== See also ==
- COVID-19 pandemic in Portland, Oregon
- Impact of the COVID-19 pandemic on the restaurant industry in the United States
- List of Cajun restaurants
