= Monster Smash (restaurant) =

Restaurant in Portland, Oregon, U.S.

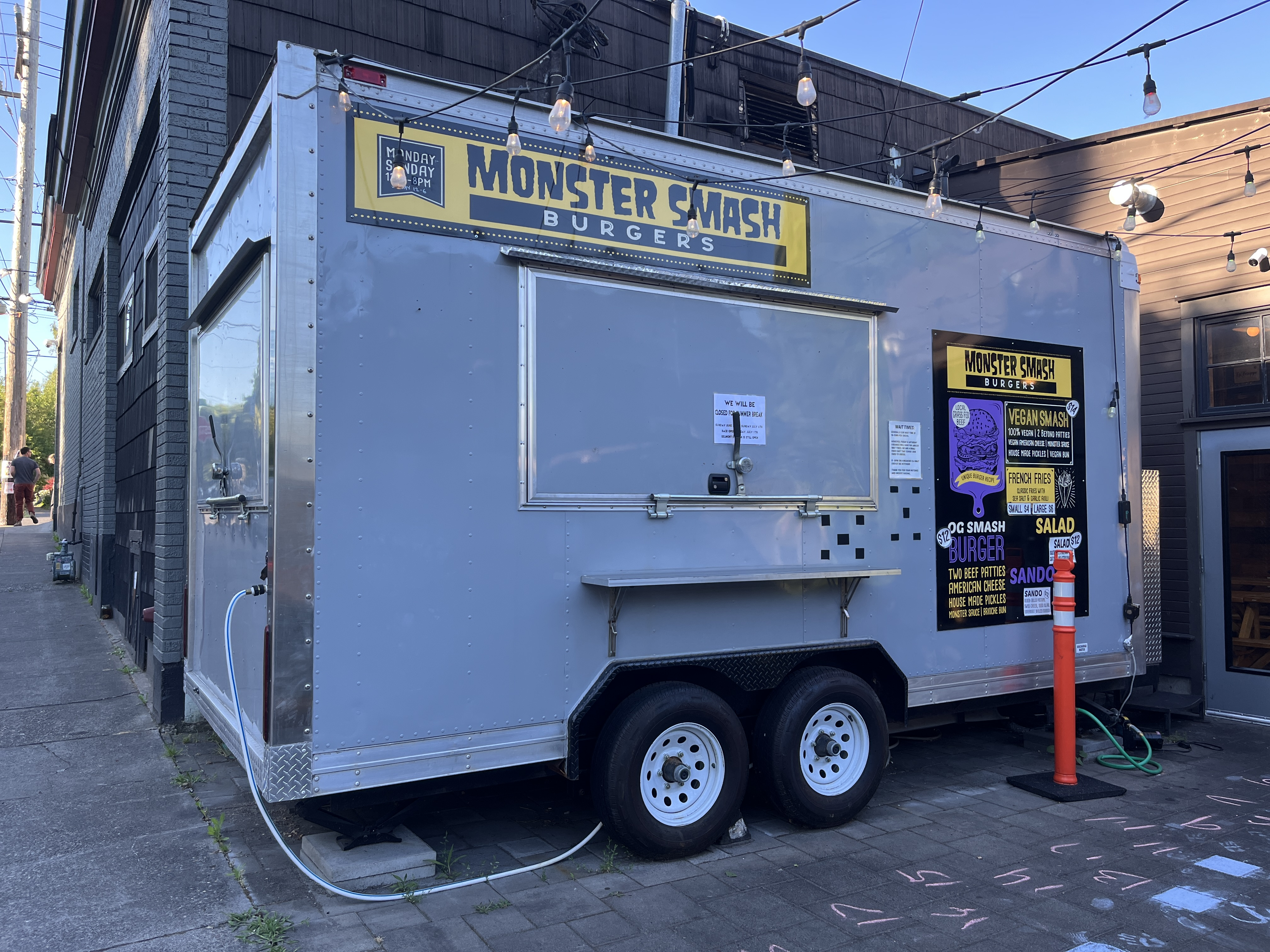
- The food cart in 2025
- Interactive map of Monster Smash

Restaurant information
- Established: February 2021
- Owner: Rico Loverde
- Chef: Rico Loverde
- Location: Portland, Multnomah, Oregon, United States
- Coordinates: 45.5192°N 122.6159°W

Monster Smash is a restaurant in Portland, Oregon, United States. Chef and owner Rico Loverde began operating the business from a food cart behind the bar Belmont Station in southeast Portland's Sunnyside neighborhood in February 2021. It serves smash burgers, French fries, soups, and salads.

== Description ==
The restaurant Monster Smash serves smash burgers and other food options from a food cart in Portland, Oregon. It neighbors the bar Belmont Station on Stark Street in southeast Portland's Sunnyside neighborhood. The OG Smash Burger has two beef patties, American cheese, housemade pickles, and "Monster sauce" on a brioche bun made by Dos Hermanos Bakery. A vegan burger uses Beyond Meat "beef". Willamette Week has described the "Monster sauce" as a "classic" Thousand Island-style dressing with ketchup, mayonnaise, yellow mustard, and seasonings. One salad has beets, fennel, goat cheese, candied pecans, and pomegranate seeds. French fries are served with garlic aioli. The Soup & Sando option has a smoked tomato bisque and a sandwich with pesto, provolone, and genoa salami.

== History ==
Chef and owner Rico Loverde began operating Monster Smash in February 2021, replacing Monk's Deli at Belmont Station. His wife Alaina also works in the food cart.

In 2021, the restaurant closed for a week because of a heat wave. Monster Smash also experienced pipe bursts. In late 2022, KATU reported that Monster Smash planned to open a second location at the intersection of Sandy Boulevard and 86th in 2023. The outpost came to fruition. In 2023, propane tanks were stolen at the Belmont Station location.

== Reception ==
In her 2020 overview of Portland's five best smash burgers for the magazine PDX Parent, Denise Castañon called the burgers "scarily good" and the French fries "yummy". Michael Russell of The Oregonian called the sandwich served with the Soup & Sando "a contender for the best grilled cheese in the city right now". Meira Gebel and Emily Harris included Monster Smash in Axios Portland's 2023 overview of Portland's best burgers.

Jashayla Pettigrew included the business in KOIN's 2023 overview of the best smash burgers in the Portland metropolitan areas, based on Yelp reviews. Rebecca Roland, Janey Wong, and Ron Scott included Monster Smash in Eater Portland's 2024 overview of the city's "best, beefiest" burgers. The writers said, "Monster Smash is up in the top tier of smash burgers in town among locals... It's located at Belmont Station, which makes for a beer lover's dream as the pairing options there are among the best to be found anywhere in the city."
