= Le Bistro Montage Ala Cart =

Restaurant in the Portland metropolitan area, Oregon, U.S.

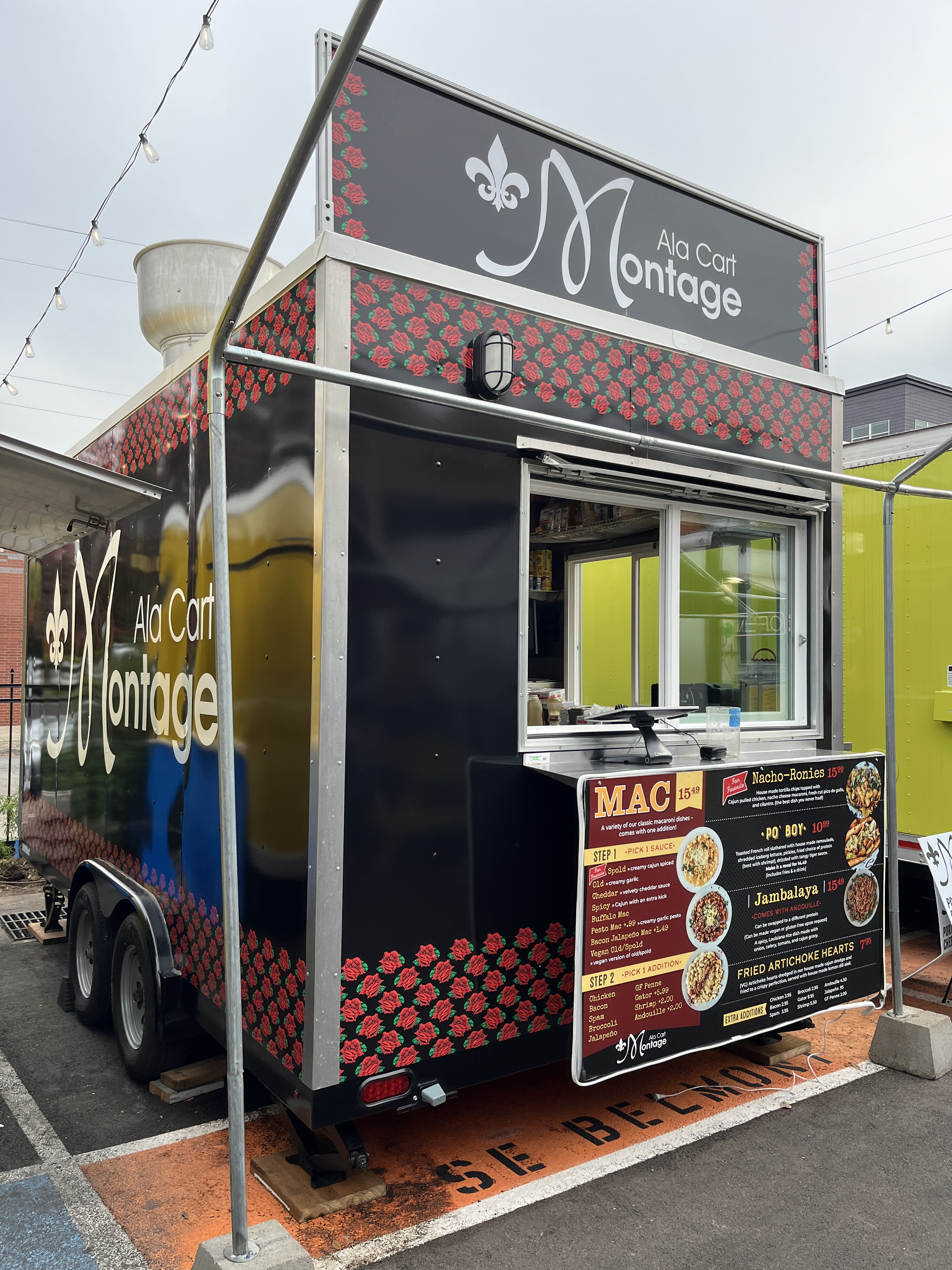
- Le Bistro Montage Ala Cart operating at The Heist in southeast Portland, Oregon's Woodstock neighborhood in 2021

Restaurant information
- Established: August 8, 2020
- Owners: Derek Ingwood; Scot Abplanalp
- Chef: Derek Ingwood
- Food type: Southern
- Location: Oregon, United States

Le Bistro Montage Ala Cart, or simply Montage Ala Cart, is a Southern restaurant operating from multiple food carts in the Portland metropolitan area, in the United States.

== Description ==
The restaurant Le Bistro Montage Ala Cart, or simply Montage Ala Cart, operates from food carts in the Portland metropolitan area. A reiteration of the defunct restaurant Le Bistro Montage, Montage Ala Cart has operated at Hawthorne Asylum in southeast Portland's Buckman neighborhood, in Happy Valley, and at BG's Food Cartel in Beaverton.

Orders sometimes come with tin foil roses or other shapes, a tribute to Le Bistro Montage's practice of wrapping leftovers in foil shaped like animals.

=== Menu ===
The Southern menu has included fried artichokes, jambalaya, multiple varieties of Cajun-style macaroni and cheese, po'boys, and "nacho-ronis", which have fried chips, Cajun pulled chicken, nacho cheese macaroni, pico de gallo, and cilantro. The restaurant also serves alligator, andouille, and bacon.

== History ==
On July 29, 2020, chef and co-owner Derek Ingwood announced plans to start operating a food cart at Hawthorne Asylum on August 8. Ingwood was previously the executive chef at Le Bistro Montage, which closed in June 2020, for approximately four years. After learning about the restaurant's planned closure, Ingwood approached the owners with an offer to license the name. Ingwood kept some of Le Bistro Montage's menu options for the food cart's menu, also adding some new items.

According to Restaurant Business, Ingwood spent approximately $70,000 to get the food cart operating. Launching during the COVID-19 pandemic, he invested in POS equipment and a contactless payment setup. Scot Abplanalp has also been described as a co-owner of Montage Ala Cart.

Montage Ala Cart later operated in Happy Valley, and in February 2022, Ingwood announced plans to start operating a food cart at BG's Food Cartel in Beaverton in March.

== Reception ==
Eater Portland included Montage Ala Cart in a 2024 list of the city's "killer" Southern restaurants and food carts.

== See also ==
- List of Southern restaurants
