= KJG =

KJG, KjG, or kjg may refer to:

- Katholische Junge Gemeinde, German Catholic youth organization
- Khmu language, Austroasiatic language spoken in Laos
- Kim Jong Grillin', Korean restaurant in Portland, Oregon, U.S.
- Kurdistan Justice Group, political party in the Kurdistan Region, Iraq
