= Frybaby =

Restaurant in Portland, Oregon, U.S.

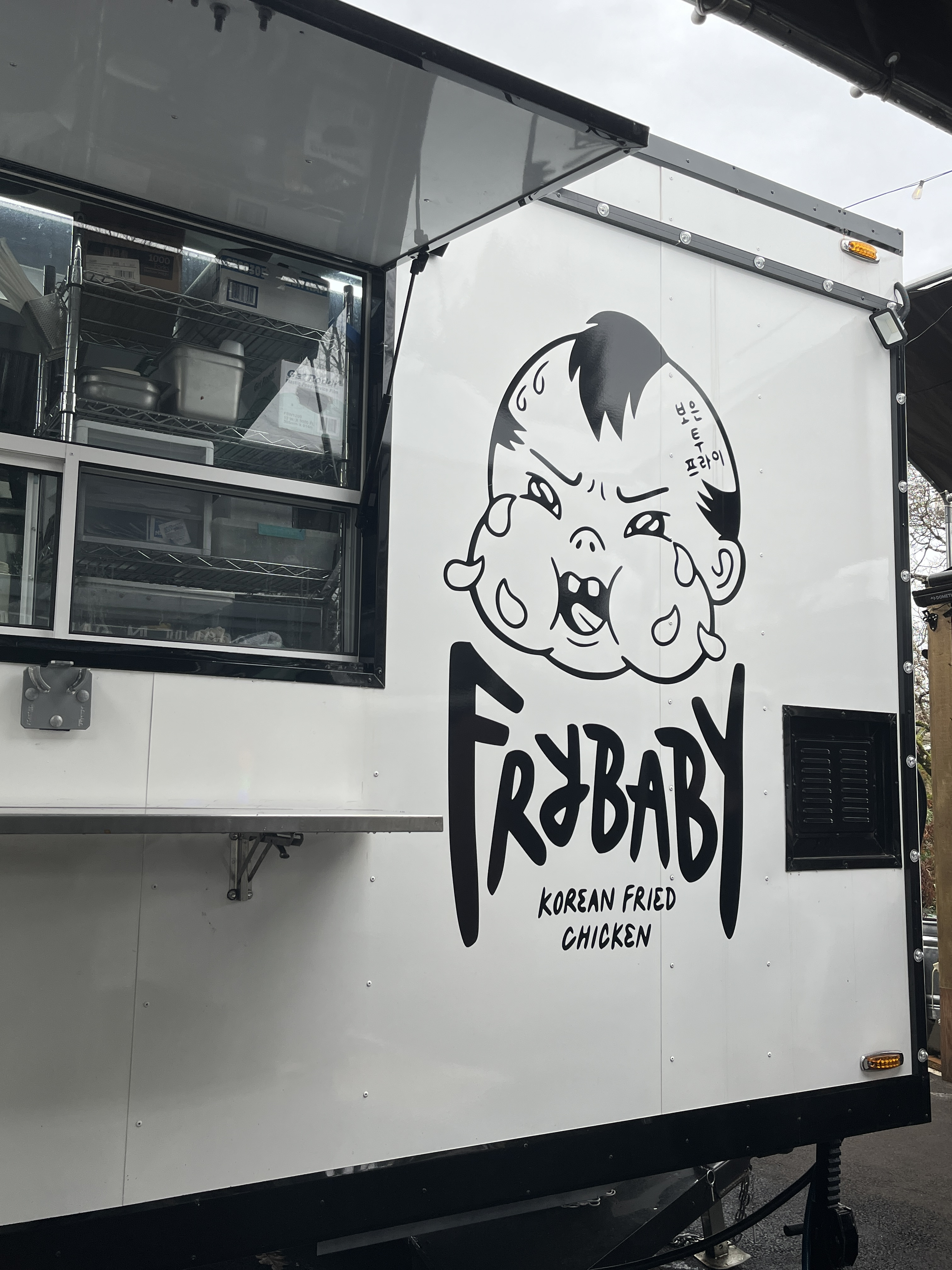
- The food cart at The Heist, 2026
- Interactive map of Frybaby

Restaurant information
- Established: 2023
- Owner: Sunny Hatch
- Chef: Sunny Hatch
- Food type: Korean; Korean-American
- Location: Portland, Multnomah, Oregon, United States
- Coordinates: 45.5195°N 122.6552°W

Frybaby is a restaurant in Portland, Oregon, United States. Chef and owner Sunny Hatch operates the business from a food cart in The Heist in southeast Portland's Woodstock neighborhood. Previously, the restaurant operated from the Pan y Pueblo (formerly known as Lil' America) pod in southeast Portland's Buckman neighborhood.

Frybaby specializes in Korean fried chicken and the menu also has Southern-inspired sides such as macaroni and cheese with kimchi, mashed potatoes with curry gravy, and coleslaw. The restaurant has garnered a positive reception and was named Food Cart of the Year by The Oregonian in 2023.

== Description ==
Frybaby operates from a food cart at The Heist, a pod in southeast Portland's Woodstock neighborhood. Previously, the business operated from the Pan y Pueblo (formerly known as Lil' America) pod, which hosts BIPOC- and LGBTQ-owned businesses, in southeast Portland's Buckman neighborhood. Michael Russell of The Oregonian described Frybaby as the owner's "ode to the fantastic fried chicken he first tried during a tipsy night hanging with new hostel friends on a trip to South Korea".

Frybaby specializes in Korean fried chicken and other Korean (or "Korean American") foods, as well as "Southern-inspired" sides. Wings, drumsticks, and thighs are mixed with potato, rice, and tapioca flour, with vodka in the batter. Sauces for wings include gochujang and soy garlic snow cheese. The menu also includes garlic butter rice, macaroni and cheese with kimchi, smashed cucumbers, sesame lime coleslaw, bo ssam collard greens and mashed potatoes with curry gravy as sides.

== History ==
Frybaby opened with the Lil' America pod in 2023. Sunny Hatch is the chef and owner. For the Portland Mercury's "Weiner Week" event in 2025, Frybaby served a Korean Corn Cheese Dog, or a hot dog with mozzarella Korean corn cheese, kimchi-gochujang sauce, sesame seeds, and green onions. In October 2025, Frybaby relocated from Lil' America to The Heist.

== Reception ==
In 2023, Frybaby was named Food Cart of the Year by The Oregonian. The business was a runner-up in the Best Wings category of Willamette Week's annual 'Best of Portland' readers' poll in 2024. It placed second in the same category in 2025. Alex Frane included Frybaby in Portland Monthly's 2025 guide to the city's best fried chicken. Katherine Chew Hamilton included the business in Portland Mercury's 2026 list of the city's top twenty food carts.

Frybaby won in the Best New Food Cart category of Eater Portland's annual Eater Awards in 2023. Ron Scott and Thom Hilton included the business in the website's 2024 overview of Portland's "best real-deal" fried chicken. The duo recommended the mashed potatoes with curry gravy and the kimchi mac and cheese. In 2025, the website's Rebecca Roland included Frybaby in a list of Portland's best Korean food and Katrina Yentch included the business in an overview of the best restaurants in Buckman.

== See also ==
- Fried chicken restaurant
- History of Korean Americans in Portland, Oregon
- List of Korean restaurants
