= Câche Câche (restaurant) =

Defunct seafood restaurant in Portland, Oregon, U.S.

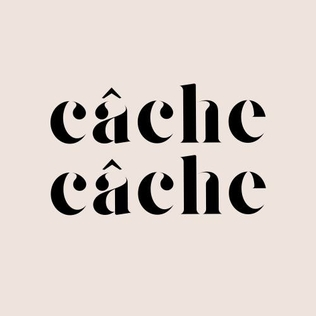
- Interactive map of Câche Câche

Restaurant information
- Established: May 16, 2023
- Closed: June 2024
- Chef: John Denison
- Food type: Seafood
- Location: 1015 Southeast Stark Street, Portland, Multnomah, Oregon, 97214, United States
- Coordinates: 45.5195°N 122.6553°W
- Seating capacity: 20

Câche Câche was a seafood restaurant in Portland, Oregon's Buckman neighborhood, in the United States.

== Description ==
Câche Câche (French for "hide-and-seek" and pronounced "cash cash") was a seafood restaurant in southeast Portland's Buckman neighborhood. The 800-square foot space had a seating capacity of 20 people. It shared a patio with the Pan y Pueblo (then known as Lil' America) food cart pod. The menu included lobster rolls, a sardine toast, hamachi, and raw oysters. Orders were submitted using QR codes and picked up at a counter. The business did not have a phone number or website.

== History ==
John Denison was the chef. He was previously a chef at St. Jack, and Câche Câche was his first solo project. The restaurant opened on May 16, 2023, and closed in June 2024. A post on social media read: "We had a great year serving you all but John has many more ideas up his sleeve and will be pursuing those both in Portland and abroad. All of us will be looking forward to following your next adventures as you prepare for your journey to France."

== Reception ==
Janey Wong and Brooke Jackson-Glidden included the business in Eater Portland's 2023 overview of recommended establishments for "fully loaded" lobster rolls in the metropolitan area. Krista Garcia included Câche Câche in The Infatuation's 2024 list of the 24 best restaurants in Portland.

== See also ==
- List of oyster bars
- List of seafood restaurants
