= Bake on the Run =

Restaurant in Portland, Oregon, U.S.

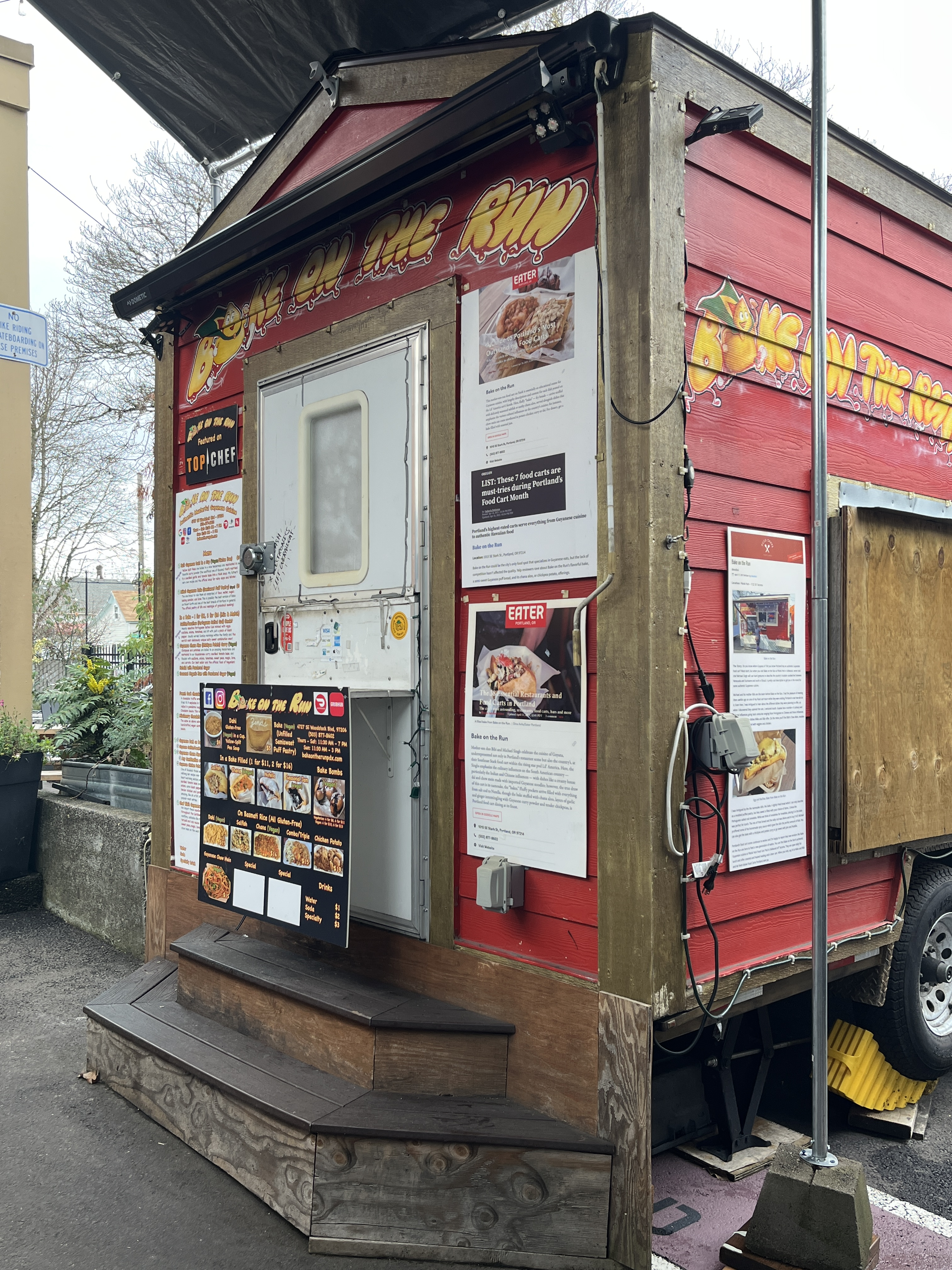
- The food cart at The Heist in southeast Portland's Woodstock neighborhood, 2026

Restaurant information
- Owners: Bibi and Michael Singh
- Food type: Guyanese
- Location: Oregon, United States

Bake on the Run is a Guyanese restaurant in the Portland metropolitan area, in the U.S. state of Oregon. The business was established in 2018. Bibi and Michael Singh operate the restaurant from a food cart, which has previously been installed in Portland's Sellwood-Moreland neighborhood, the Hawthorne Asylum and Pan y Pueblo (formerly known as Lil' America) pods, the Central Eastside district and The Heist in southeast Portland's Woodstock neighborhood. In 2026, it moved to the 1847 Food Park in Milwaukie.

Bake on the Run was featured on Top Chef: Portland and was the only Guyanese restaurant on the West Coast, as of 2023.

== Description ==
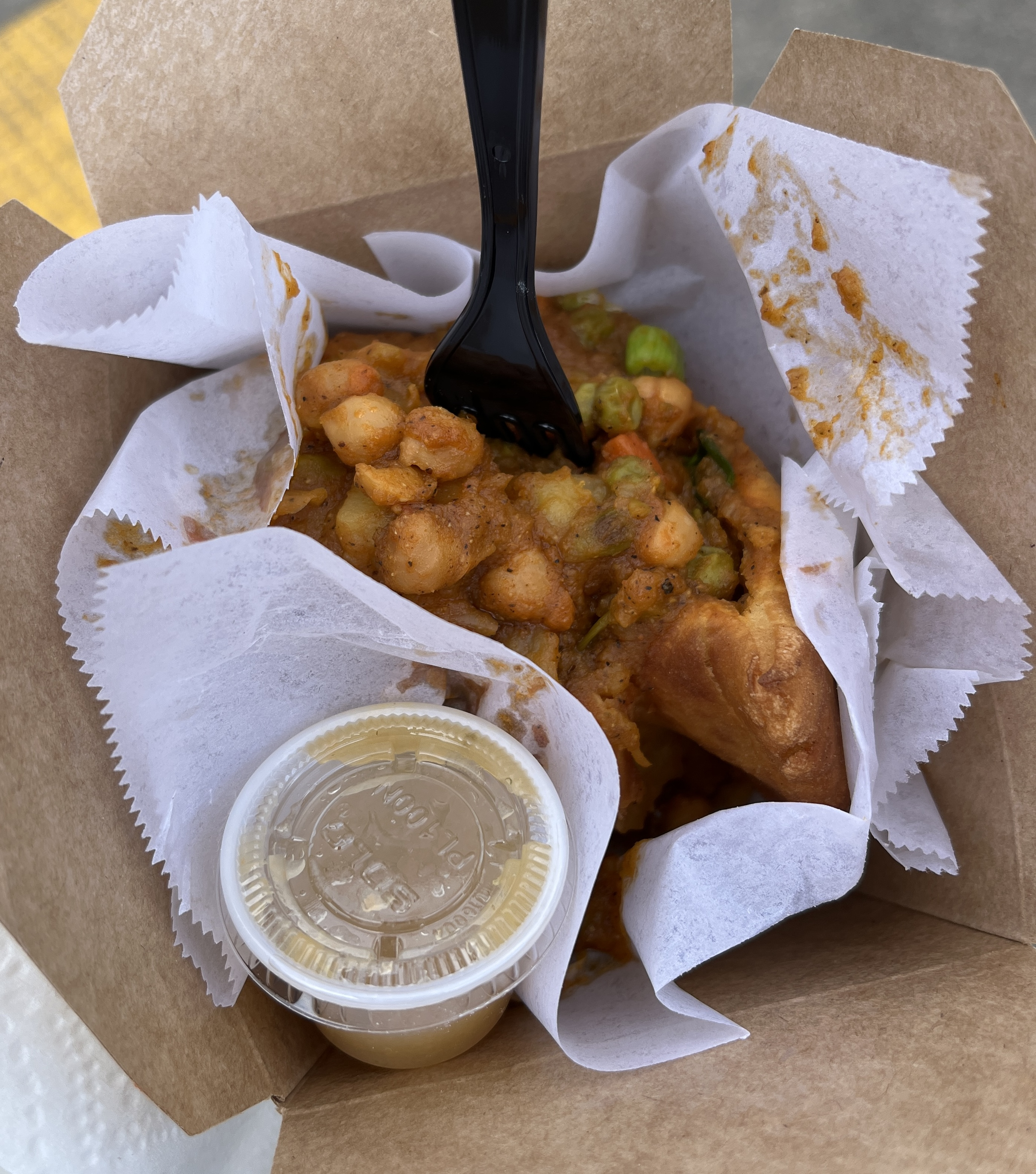
Bake with chana aloo (chickpea potato) curry

The family-operated restaurant Bake on the Run operates from a food cart and serves Guyanese cuisine. The menu includes chow mein, bakes with savory and sweet fillings, and pastries. Among vegan options are yellow split pea dahl and chana aloo curry. The Chef Bibi's Famous Peppersauce has been described as a "yellow condiment that's more piquant than blistering". According to Eater Portland, the restaurant "is essentially an educational center for Guyanese cuisine, with lengthy descriptions and context for each dish posted on the cart’s facade".

== History ==
Mother and son duo Bibi and Michael Singh began operating Bake on the Run in 2018. The two have operated the food cart at the Piknik Park pod in southeast Portland's Sellwood-Moreland neighborhood.

In 2021, the business was operating at southeast Portland's Hawthorne Asylum pod. Bake on the Run was also featured in an episode of Top Chef: Portland, the eighteenth season of the television series Top Chef.

In 2022, the business announced plans to relocate to the Pan y Pueblo (formerly known as Lil' America) pod. Bake on the Run was still at Lil' America in 2023. According to Portland Monthly, the business was the only Guyanese restaurant on the West Coast at the time. Bake on the Run operated at the Wonderlove pod in Portland's Central Eastside district in 2024 and The Heist in southeast Portland's Woodstock neighborhood in 2025. It moved the 1847 Food Park in Milwaukie in 2026.

== Reception ==
Waz Wu included Bake on the Run in Eater Portland's 2021 overview of recommended restaurants for "standout" vegan curries in the city. Ron Scott and Olivia Lee included the business in the website's 2023 list of "stellar" Caribbean cuisine in the Portland metropolitan area. Wu also included Bake on the Run in a 2023 overview of Portland's best food carts for vegan food. Janey Wong included the business in a 2025 list of the city's best food carts. Separately, another writer included the business in a 2025 list of Portland's best food carts. Krista Garcia included the business in The Infatuation's 2024 and 2025 lists of the city's best food carts. The business ranked number 18 in Yelp's 2025 list of the 100 best food trucks in the U.S., based on reviews.
