= Pan y Pueblo =

Food cart pod in Portland, Oregon, U.S.

- Former name: Lil' America
- Logo
- Opened: April 2023
- Address: 1015 Southeast Stark Street; Portland, Oregon, United States
- Location within Portland, Oregon
- Coordinates: 45.5195°N 122.6555°W
- Website: panypueblopdx.com

Pan y Pueblo, formerly known as Lil' America, is a food pod (or group of food carts) in Portland, Oregon's Buckman neighborhood, in the United States.

== Description and history ==
Former logo when the food cart pod was called Lil' America

The pod opened as Lil' America at Stark Street and 10th Avenue in southeast Portland's Buckman neighborhood in April 2023, in the space previously occupied by MidCity SmashedBurger. Initial businesses in the pod were LGBTQ- and/or BIPOC-owned. The project has been a collaboration between ChefStable and the restaurant group Win Win. KOIN has described Win Win as an "organization that creates equitable and sustainable opportunities in the food industry for the queer and trans community".

On August 29, 2025, owner ChefStable asked three vendors to leave by the end of October: Hawker Station, Makulít, and Speed-O Cappuccino. Frybaby also announced plans to relocate by then. These vendors, however, had already made preparations to depart the pod in unison, in response to management's de facto retreat from the pod's original mission as an incubator for LGBTQ and BIPOC restaurateurs, a dynamic underscored by Win Win's previous disassociation from ChefStable and subsequent dissolution. Management claimed the decrease in the number of vendors was a result of the expansion of neighboring Dos Hermanos Bakery, although that claim was contested by the evicted vendors.

The pod was nominally renovated and renamed Pan y Pueblo. In December 2025 the pod had six carts, by February of 2026 four remained. Two carts were expected to join in January 2026: a Yucatecan cart operated by the father of the brothers who own Dos Hermanos Bakery, and another serving hamburgers and French fries, but remained absent come February of that year.

=== Tenants ===
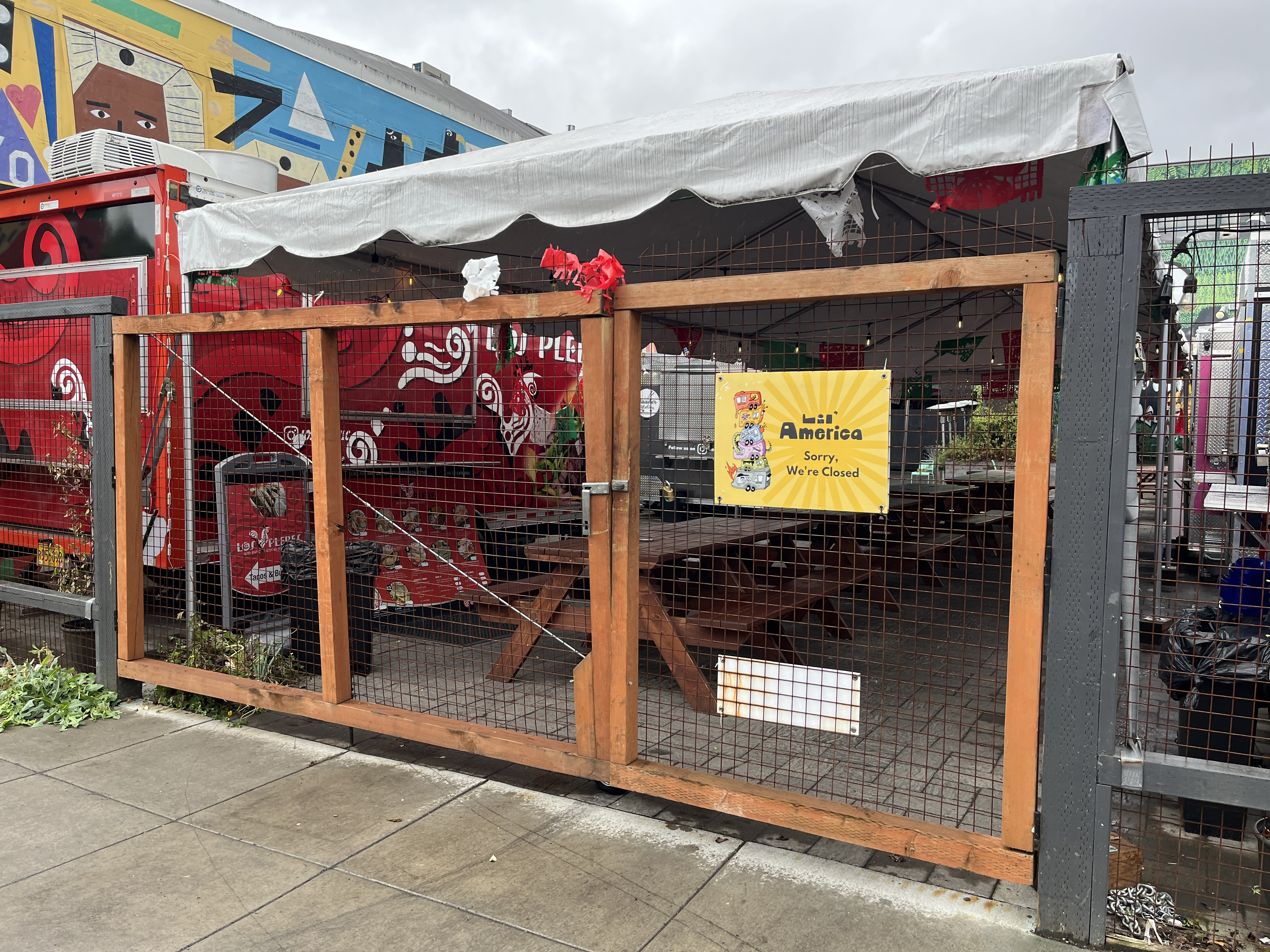
Entrance to Lil' America in 2025

Tenants, which pay a monthly flat fee to operate in the pod, have included:

- Bake on the Run (Guyanese cuisine)
- Câche Câche
- Drip'n Crab
- Flame Pizza
- Frybaby (Korean fried chicken)
- Hawker Station
- Los Plebes
- Makulit (Filipino cuisine), the first to sign on to the project
- Noah Halal
- Speed-O Cappuccino

Frybaby was named Food Cart of the Year by The Oregonian in 2023.

== See also ==
- Culture of Portland, Oregon
- Food carts in Portland, Oregon
- LGBTQ culture in Portland, Oregon
