= Hawthorne Asylum =

Food cart pod in Portland, Oregon, U.S.

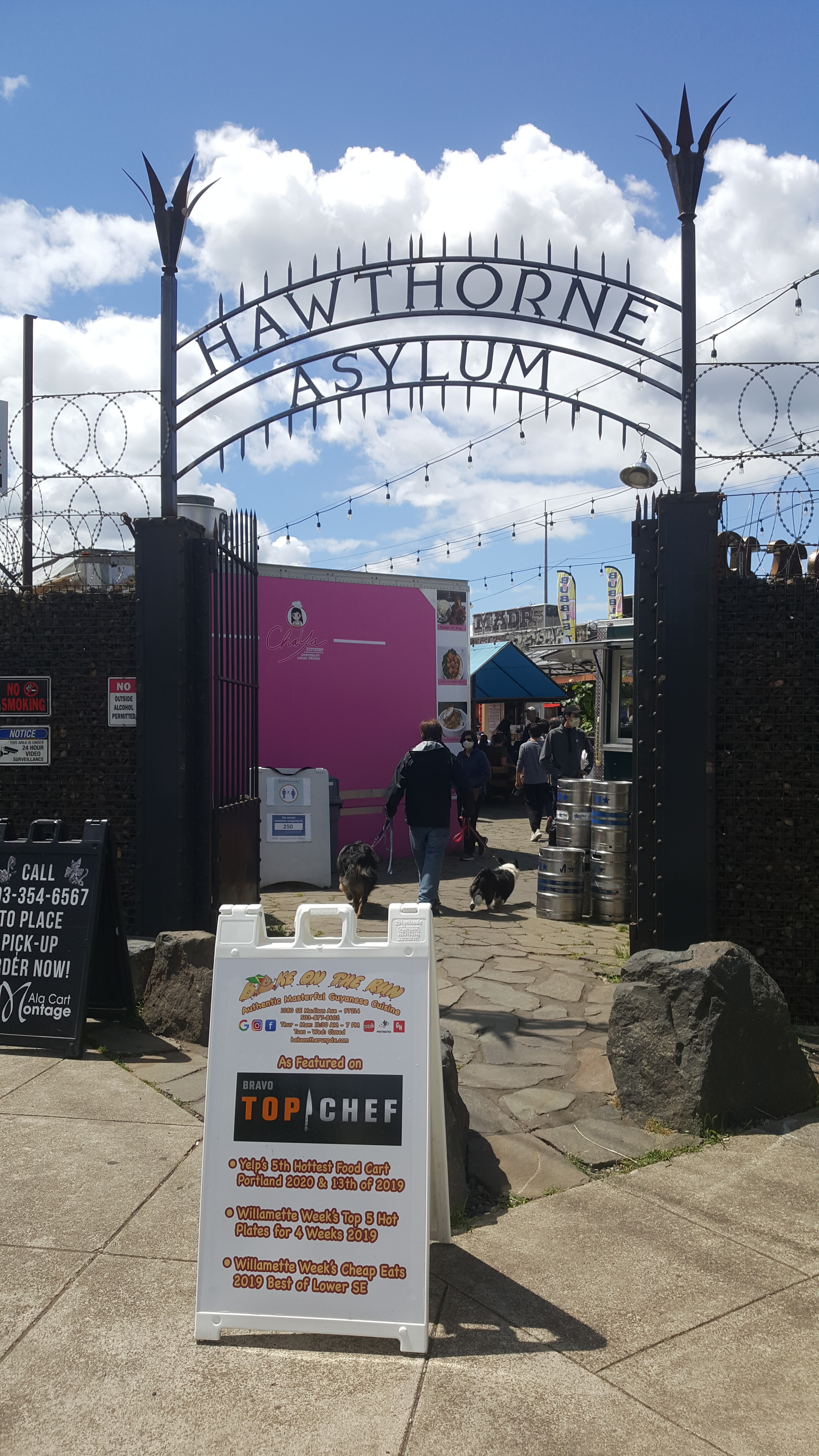
- Entrance, 2021
- Manager: Brock Johnson
- Location: Portland, Oregon, U.S.
- Address: 1080 SE Madison St
- Location within Portland, Oregon
- Coordinates: 45°30′46″N 122°39′18″W

The Hawthorne Asylum is a food cart pod in the Hawthrone District of Portland, Oregon, United States. There are more than 20 carts, as of April 2021. The pod also has picnic tables and fire pits.

== History ==
The food cart pod opened in February 2019 and was named after the Oregon Hospital for the Insane and its co-founder (and also the district's namesake) James C. Hawthorne. Approximately a dozen carts were burglarized in January 2021. Vendors have included:

- Amedia
- Bake on the Run
- Bark City BBQ
- Black Dagger PDX
- Le Bistro Montage Ala Cart
- Smaaken Waffle Sandwiches
- Tall Boy Fish and Chips
- Your Side Chicks (closed in 2024)

== Reception ==
Pete Cottell of Willamette Week wrote, "Named after a 19th-century hospital for the mentally ill, the pod looks like what might happen if Tim Burton were commissioned to design a Portland-themed section of Disneyland."

== See also ==
- James C. Hawthorne
- Oregon Hospital for the Insane
