= Sammich (restaurant) =

Restaurant chain in the U.S. state of Oregon

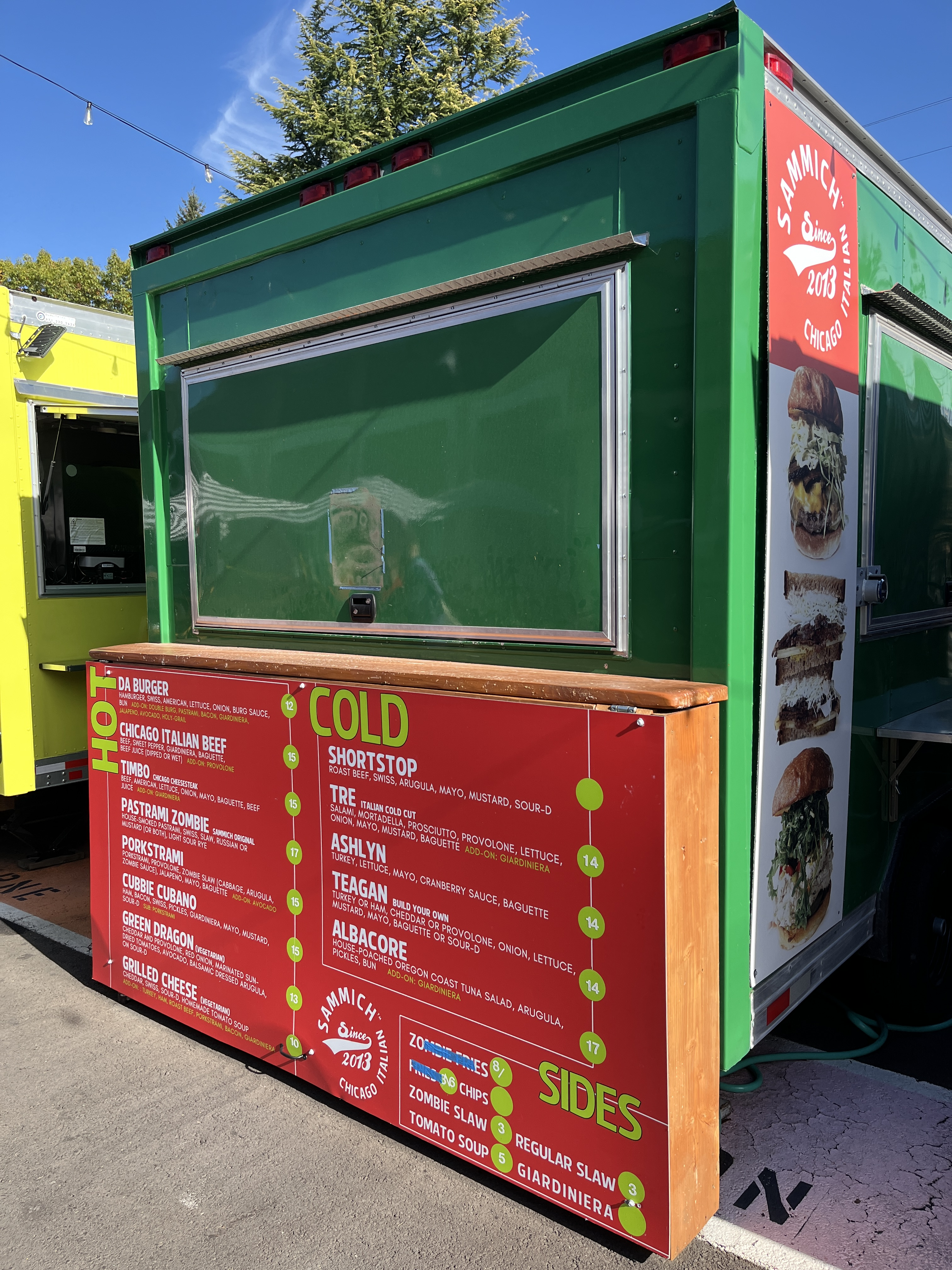
- Sammich food cart in Woodstock, Portland, Oregon, 2024
- Interactive map of Sammich

Restaurant information
- Established: 2013
- Owner: Melissa "Mel" McMillan
- Location: 2137 East Burnside Street, Portland, Multnomah, Oregon, United States
- Coordinates: 45.5232°N 122.6439°W

Sammich is a small chain of restaurants in the U.S. state of Oregon. The business was established in Ashland and has also operated in Lebanon and Portland. The Ashland location is sometimes referred to as Sammich Ashland, and in Portland, the business is sometimes called Sammich PDX and Sammich Portland). Previously, there was a location in Seattle from April 2023 to August 2024. The business has garnered a positive reception and has been featured on the Food Network.

== Description ==
The restaurant chain Sammich operates in Oregon, and previously Seattle, Washington. The 900-square-foot brick and mortar restaurant on East Burnside Street, in the northeast Portland part of the Kerns neighborhood, has a seating capacity of approximately 28 people.

Sandwich varieties include Italian beef, pastrami, and the Timbo, a Chicago-style cheesesteak. Sammich also serves burgers.

Sammich is an LGBTQ-owned business.

== History ==
Sammich was established in Ashland, Oregon in 2013. Chef and owner Melissa "Mel" McMillan opened the brick and mortar restaurant Sammich PDX on December 1, 2017, having previously launched Pastrami Zombie from a food truck in Portland starting in June 2016. When the Burnside Street restaurant opened in late 2017, McMillan also planned to open an outpost at 50th and Division in southeast Portland.

In 2023, Sammich began operating at The Heist, a food cart pod in southeast Portland's Woodstock neighborhood.

In addition to Ashland and Portland, Sammich has operated in Lebanon, Oregon, and Seattle. The Seattle location operated from a food truck at Project 9 Brewing starting in April 2023, before closing in August 2024.

Alexa Numkena-Anderson is also a chef. Sammich appeared on the Food Network series Triple D Nation: Stuffed Stuff.

== Reception ==
In 2022, Matthew Trueherz of Portland Monthly said Sammich had the city's "finest" Italian beef sandwich. Alex Frane and Janey Wong included Sammich in Eater Portland's 2024 list of the nineteen best sandwich shops in the city. The website's Susanne Robertson included the Ashland location in a list of the city's seventeen "essential" restaurants.

== See also ==
- List of restaurant chains in the United States
