= Smaaken Waffle Sandwiches =

Restaurant chain in the Portland metropolitan area, Oregon, U.S.

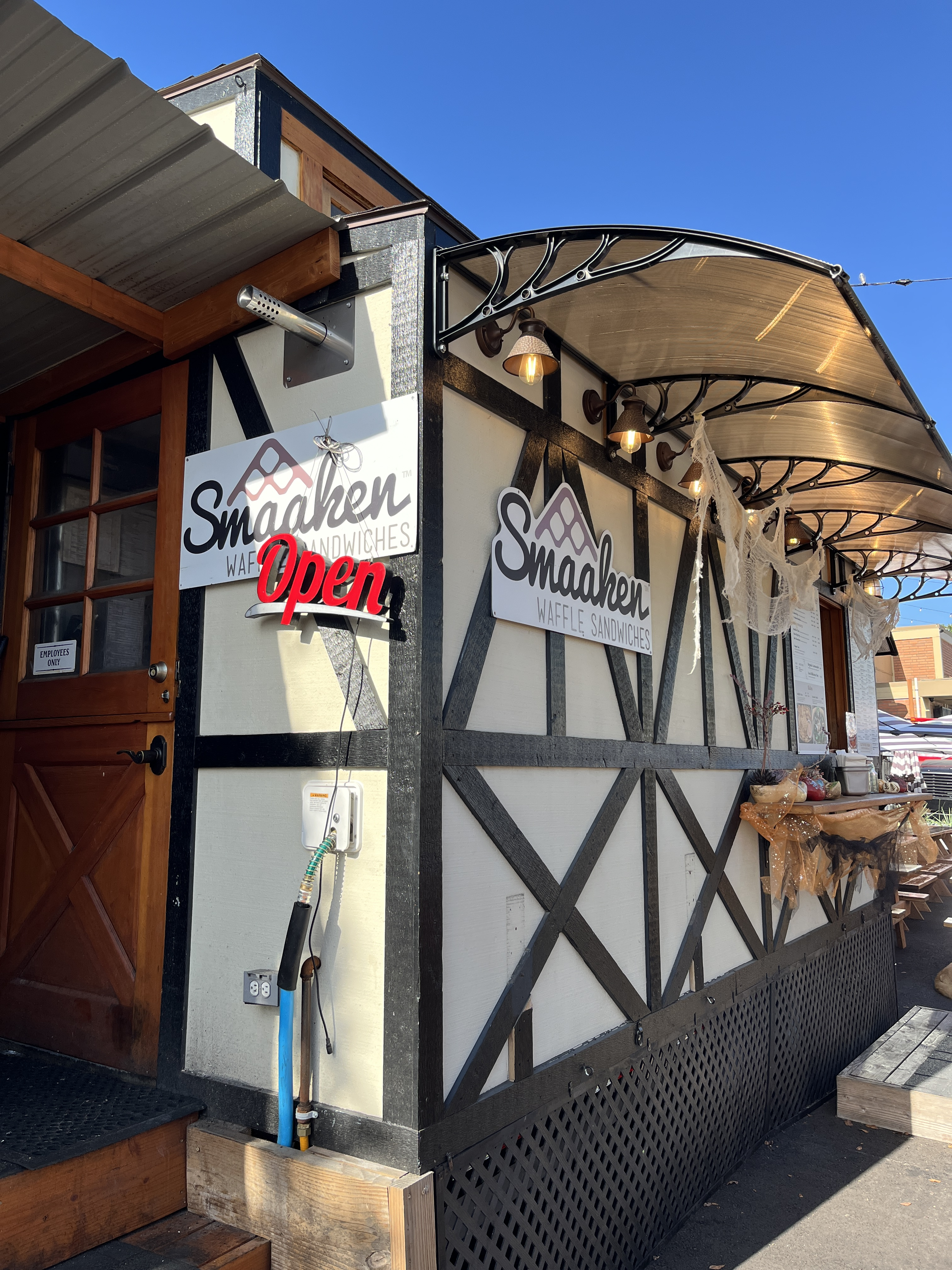
- The food cart in southeast Portland's Woodstock neighborhood, 2024

Restaurant information
- Established: 2012
- Owners: Matt Feiner; Melanie Walker
- Location: Portland; Beaverton, Oregon, United States
- Website: smaaken.com

Smaaken Waffle Sandwiches is a small chain of restaurants in the Portland metropolitan area, in the U.S. state of Oregon. The business was established by spouses Matt Feiner and Melanie Walker in 2012 and has operated food carts at various locations in Portland, including Hawthorne Asylum and Zidell Yards, and at BG's Food Cartel in Beaverton. Smaaken has garnered a positive reception for its sweet and savory sandwiches.

== Description ==
The small restaurant chain Smaaken Waffle Sandwiches operates in the Portland metropolitan area. "Smaaken" means "tasty" in Dutch.

In southeast Portland, the business has operated food carts at the Hawthorne Asylum pod in the Buckman neighborhood, at a pod called The Heist in the Woodstock neighborhood, and at the intersection of 50th and Division Street in the Mount Tabor neighborhood. Smaaken has also operated in the north Portland part of the Eliot neighborhood. Previously, the business operated in southwest Portland's Hillsdale neighborhood and at Zidell Yards. In Beaverton, Smaaken has operated at BG's Food Cartel. The Beaverton location has a small patio.

The menu includes savory and sweet sandwiches. The peanut butter cup waffle sandwich has chocolate and peanut butter on Dutch-style waffles. Other waffles sandwiches have bacon, vegan sausage, jam, maple butter, and whipped cream. The namesake and most popular sandwich has bacon from Cascade Farms, brie, and spiced apple on waffles. Among breakfast sandwiches is one with egg and cheese, and the Elvis, which has bacon, banana, and peanut butter. Another waffle sandwich has cheddar cheese, fried tofu, spinach, and Dijon mustard. The Brit has cucumber and mint jelly. Smaaken also serves coffee from Millars.

== History ==
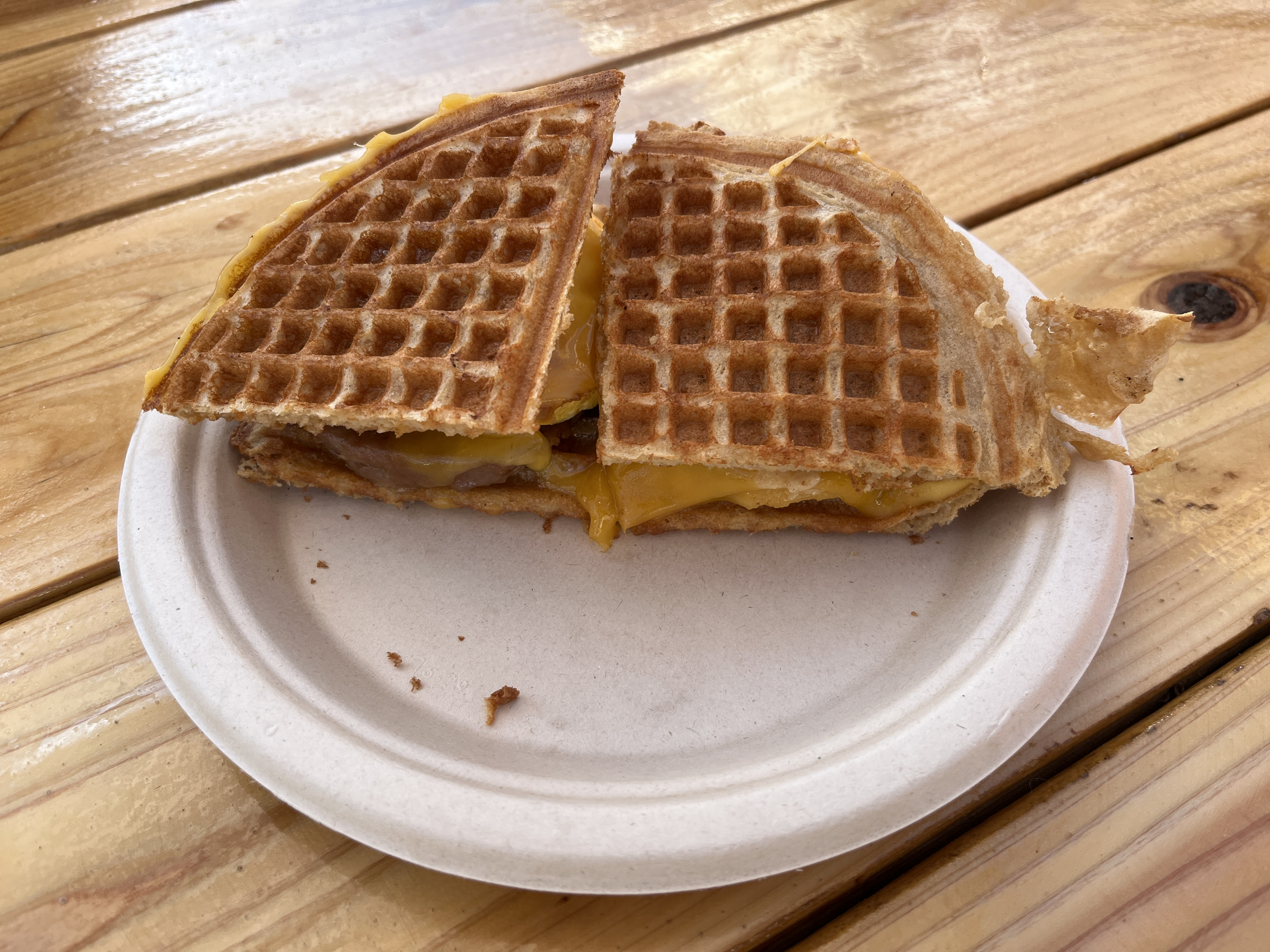
Waffle sandwich with egg, sausage, cheese, and maple butter (2024)

Spouses Matt Feiner and Melanie Walker began operating the first food cart in Hillsdale in 2012. Within two years, the cart was relocated to the Tidbit Food Farm and Garden pod (which operated from 2014 to 2017) at the intersection of 28th Avenue and Division Street, then to Zidell Yards. Both relocations were caused by development projects. Smaaken relocated to a pod called The Lot at Scout at the intersection of 50th and Division Street, then opened an outpost in Beaverton. A third location opened at Hawthorne Asylum in May 2019. Walker oversaw the menu and business operations at the time.

Smaaken began operating at Cartside Food Carts, a new pod on Williams Avenue between Broadway and Hancock Streets in Eliot, in mid 2020. Smaaken opened a food cart in Woodstock when The Heist opened on June 10, 2023.

Smaaken uses flour from Oregon farmers; as of 2012–2014, the business used wheat flour from Greenwillow Grains in Corvallis. According to Portland Monthly, "the batter is left to rest for a full 24 hours, giving it a rich, malty flavor."

== Reception ==
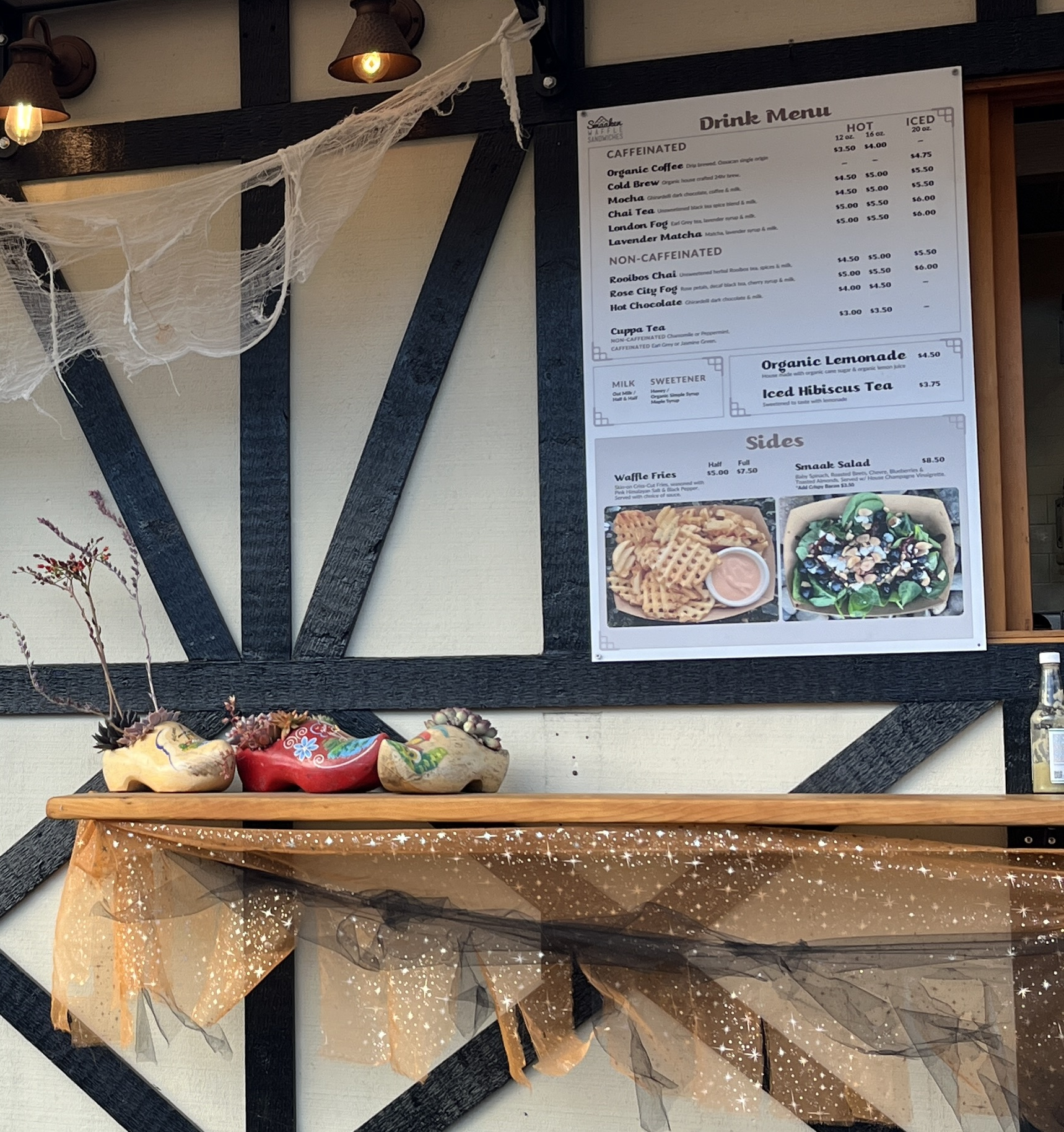
Counter and menu display at the food cart in Woodstock, 2024

Erica Iannitti included Smaaken's namesake sandwich in Portland Monthly's 2014 list of six "great summer food cart sandwiches and wrote, "At once crisp and fluffy and subtly sweet, these waffles are so delicious in their own right that we might even prefer to eat them plain." Drew Tyson recommended the waffle sandwich with pork sausage and maple butter in Thrillist's 2014 overview of eateries at Tidbit Food Farm and Garden.

In The Oregonian's 2017 list of seven "great waffles to distract you this holiday season", Michael Russell said Smaaken had "[his] favorite of Portland's fleet of waffle and waffle sandwich food carts". Carrie Uffindell included Smaaken in Eater Portland's 2017 list of the city's "most worthy" waffles. The waffle sandwiches were also included in the website's 2024 overview of Portland's eighteen best breakfast sandwiches.

In 2020, KGW included Smaaken in a list of Portland's four "favorite spots to score waffles on the cheap" and said, "With four stars out of 144 reviews on Yelp, the food truck and breakfast and brunch spot, serving waffles and more, has proven to be a local favorite for those looking for a cheap option." In 2023, a Fodor's guide said Smaaken "has developed a cult following" for the waffle sandwiches with bacon or vegan sausage with maple. Smaaken ranked first in the Best Food Cart category of Willamette Week's 'Best of Portland' readers' poll in 2024. It was a finalist in the same category in 2025.

== See also ==
- List of restaurant chains in the United States
