= The Heist (Portland, Oregon) =

Food cart pod in Portland, Oregon, U.S.

- Logo
- Opened: June 10, 2023
- Location: Portland, Oregon, United States
- Address: 4727 Southeast Woodstock Boulevard
- Location in Portland, Oregon
- Coordinates: 45.4796°N 122.6138°W

The Heist is a food cart pod in Portland, Oregon, United States. The pod opened in Southeast Portland's Woodstock neighborhood in 2023, occupying a former bank building and its parking lot. The Heist has hosted food carts serving various types of cuisine, including Bake on the Run, Bark City BBQ, Frybaby, Kim Jong Grillin', Sammich, and Smaaken Waffle Sandwiches.

== Description ==
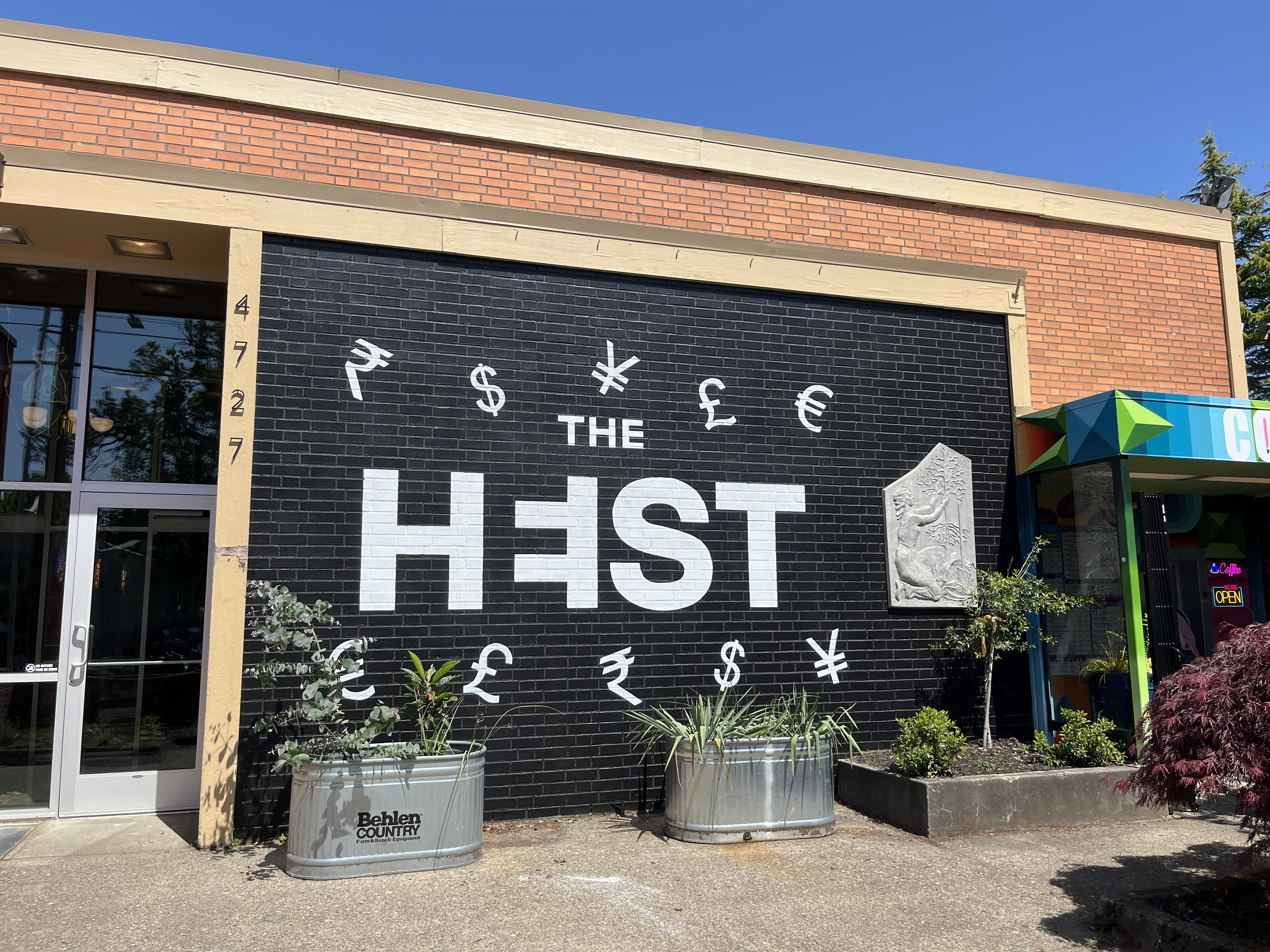
The former bank building, 2025

The Heist is a food cart pod on Woodstock Boulevard in Southeast Portland's Woodstock neighborhood. According to Eater Portland the pod's design "pays homage to the bank building that it now occupies" and a bar window occupying the space that previously housed a drive-through teller offers draught beer, cocktails, and wine. There is outdoor seating with umbrellas, as well as a shaded patio.

== History ==
Plans for the food cart pod emerged in 2023, following the closure of the U.S. Bank branch in late 2020. Michael Shall owns The Heist.

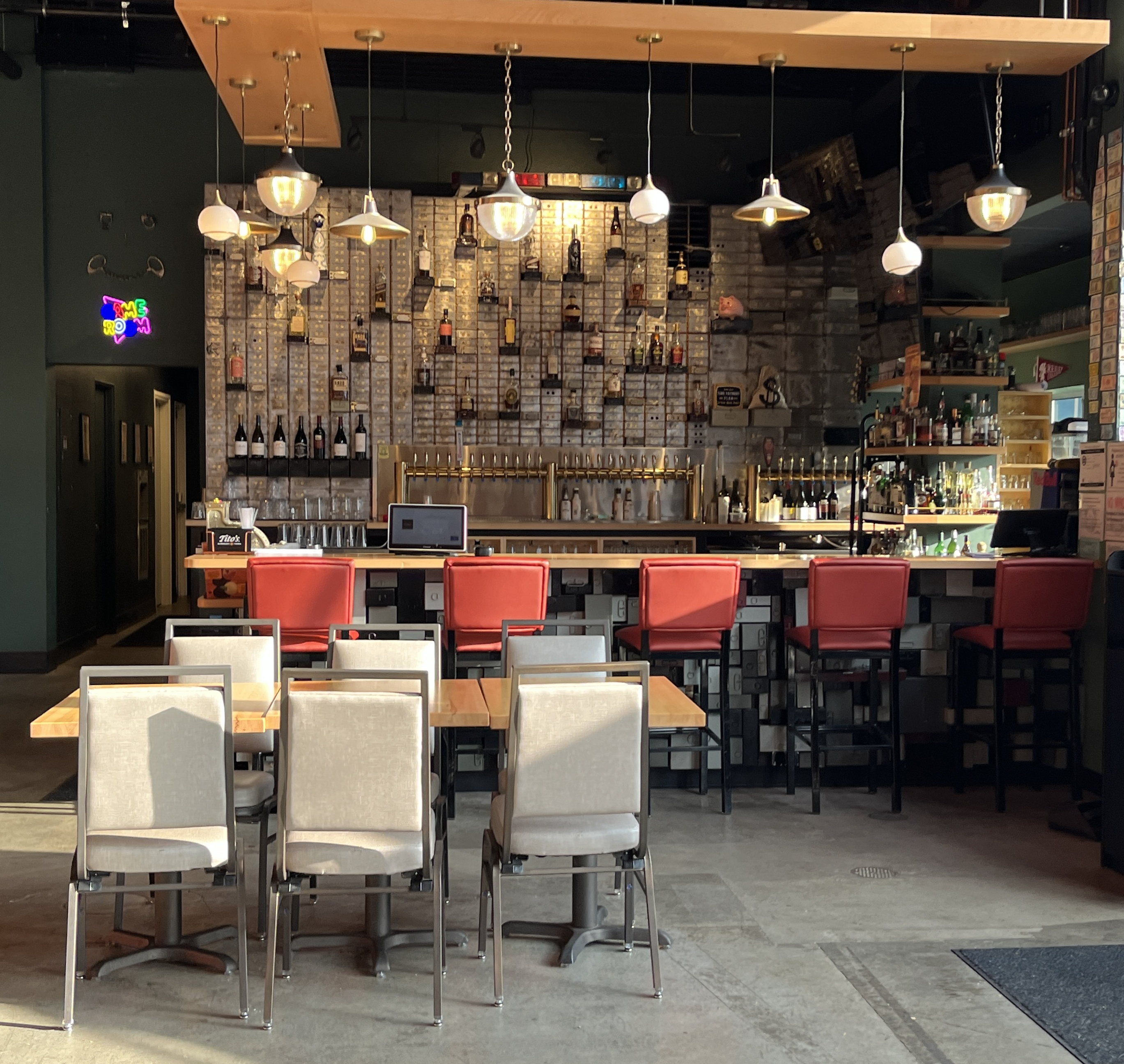
Interior bar, 2025

The Heist opened on June 10, 2023. Among the initial fifteen carts were Great Tang Chinese Food, Indian Rasoi, Namo Buddha Himalayan Cuisine, Sammich, Smaaken Waffle Sandwiches, Thai Sunflowers, and The Pit Smokehouse. Other tenants have included:

- Amani Jollof Bowl
- Bake on the Run
- Bark City BBQ
- Caffeine Withdrawal
- CoKieas Kitchen
- Cookie McCakeface
- Fitas Cocina
- Fresh n' Funky
- Frybaby
- Golden Triangle
- Kim Jong Grillin'
- Kracked Crab
- Mike's Cheesesteaks
- P53
- Pig Patas
- Pizzeria Stellina
- Rocket Breakfast
- RomoLicious Cafe
- Tacos Fita
- Wasabi Sushi

The Heist has hosted activities such as trivia by Rip City Trivia on Thursdays, as of 2025, and drag brunches featuring Poison Waters, as of 2026.

== Reception ==
Katherine Chew Hamilton and Brooke Jackson-Glidden included The Heist in Eater Portland's 2025 list of the city's best restaurants and food cart pods for large groups, writing: "No other food cart pod right now can match the Heist's level of variety or the caliber of its carts."
