= Dos Hermanos Bakery =

Bakery in Portland, Oregon, U.S.

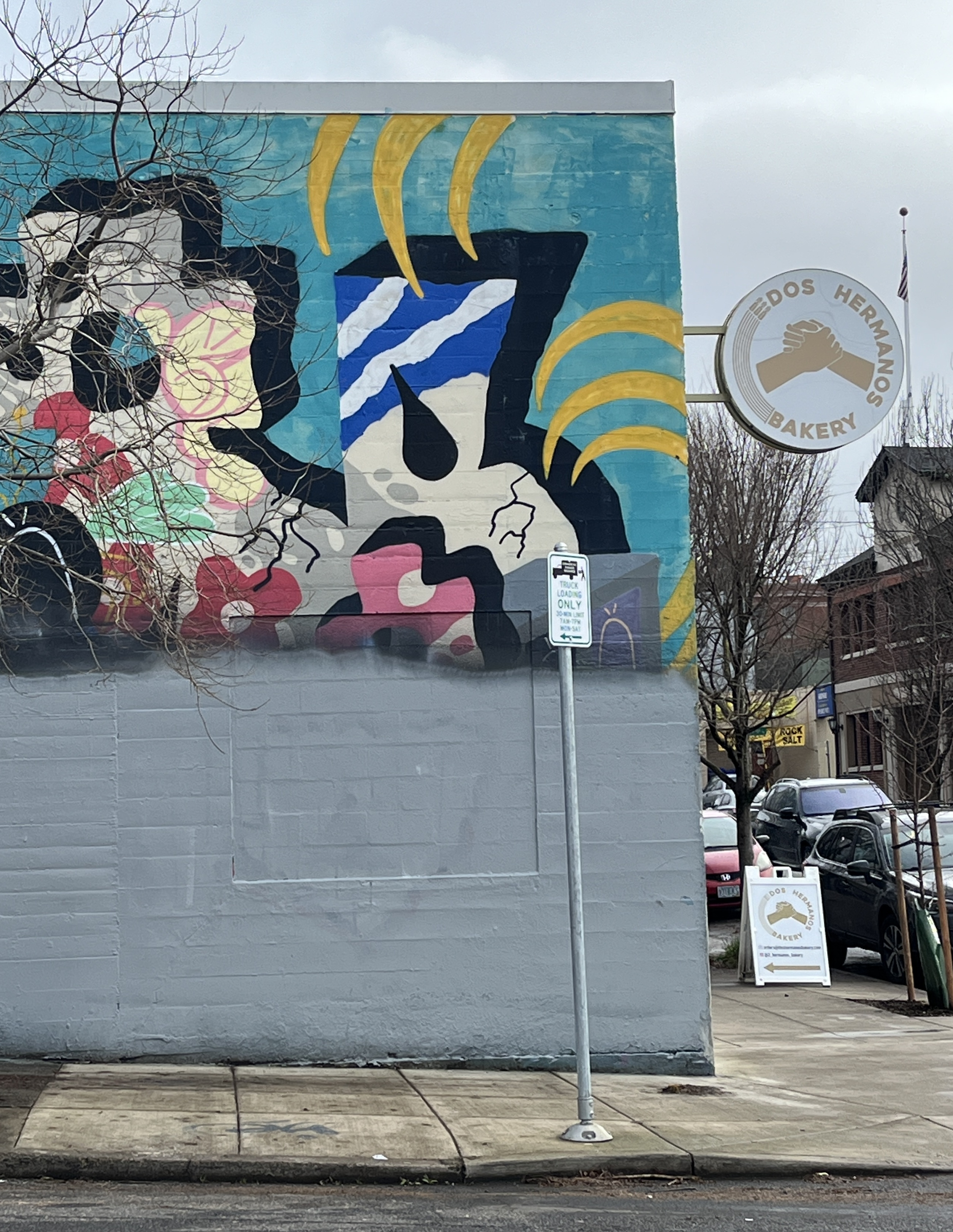
- Exterior of the bakery in southeast Portland, Oregon, 2025
- Interactive map of Dos Hermanos Bakery

Restaurant information
- Established: 2018
- Owners: Gabriel Azcorra; Josue Azcorra
- Food type: Mexican
- Location: 1015 Southeast Stark Street, Portland, Multnomah, Oregon, 97214, United States
- Coordinates: 45.5196°N 122.6553°W
- Website: doshermanosbakery.com

Dos Hermanos Bakery is a bakery in Portland, Oregon, United States. It was established in 2018 and moved from the northeast Portland part of the Boise neighborhood to southeast Portland's Buckman neighborhood in 2023. In 2025, the business announced plans to open another location in Beaverton.

== Description ==
Dos Hermanos Bakery operates at the intersection of 10th Avenue and Stark Street in southeast Portland's Buckman neighborhood, and previously operated on North Killingsworth Street in the northeast Portland part of the Boise neighborhood. It has a 7,000-square-foot production area and warehouse, operating in the same development as a Fracture Brewing taproom and the food cart pod Pan y Pueblo (formerly known as Lil' America). The interior of Dos Hermanos has terracotta-colored tiles and a mural depicting Chichen Itza.

=== Menu ===
Dos Hermanos offers sandwiches, sourdough, and Mexican-inspired baked goods such as baguettes with habanero and pumpkin seeds, as well as conchas and small pies with ham, cheese, and jalapeño.

Sandwich varieties include: the Bada Bing, which has Italian cured meats, provolone, peppers, lettuce, tomatoes, mayonnaise, mustard, and vinegar; the Beast Master, which has roast beef, horseradish, and chips; the Get Him to the Greek, which has chickpeas, feta, olives, pepperoncini; the Irish Goodbye, which has corned beef and sauerkraut; and the Papa Gabe, which has chicharrónes, escabeche, ham, queso fresco, and salsa verde.

== History ==
Interior display case, 2025

The business was founded by brothers Gabriel and Josue Azcorra, from Mérida, Yucatán. According to The Oregonian: "In 2017, ChefStable owner Kurt Huffman reached out to the brothers to see if they might be interested in taking over Philippe's Bread, an 1,800-square-foot bakery originally opened by French baker Philippe Garcia to fuel several ChefStable restaurants, including the rapidly growing Lardo. Huffman told the brothers that if they managed to turn the business around, they could earn an ownership stake in the business. After rebranding as Dos Hermanos in 2018, the bakery quickly turned a profit." The brothers owned 50.1 percent of Dos Hermanos in 2023.

In 2023, Dos Hermanos moved from Boise to Buckman and made approximately 18,000 loaves of ciabatta weekly. It has supplied baked goods to local restaurants, such as rolls for Demarco's Sandwiches, bread for Kimura, and brioche for Monster Smash. Dos Hermanos has also supplied English muffins to New Seasons Market.

Dos Hermanos has operated a booth at the farmers' market in southeast Portland's Woodstock neighborhood. In 2025, the business announced plans to open another location in Beaverton.

== Reception ==
Michelle Lopez and Janey Wong included Dos Hermanos in Eater Portland's 2024 and 2025 lists of the city's best bakeries. The website's Krista Garcia also included the business in a 2025 overview of Portland's best Mexican restaurants and food carts. Dos Hermanos won in the Best Bakery category of Willamette Week's annual 'Best of Portland' readers' poll in 2024, 2025, and 2026.

== See also ==
- Hispanics and Latinos in Portland, Oregon
- List of bakeries
- List of restaurant chains in the United States
