= Bark City BBQ =

Barbecue restaurant in Portland, Oregon, U.S.

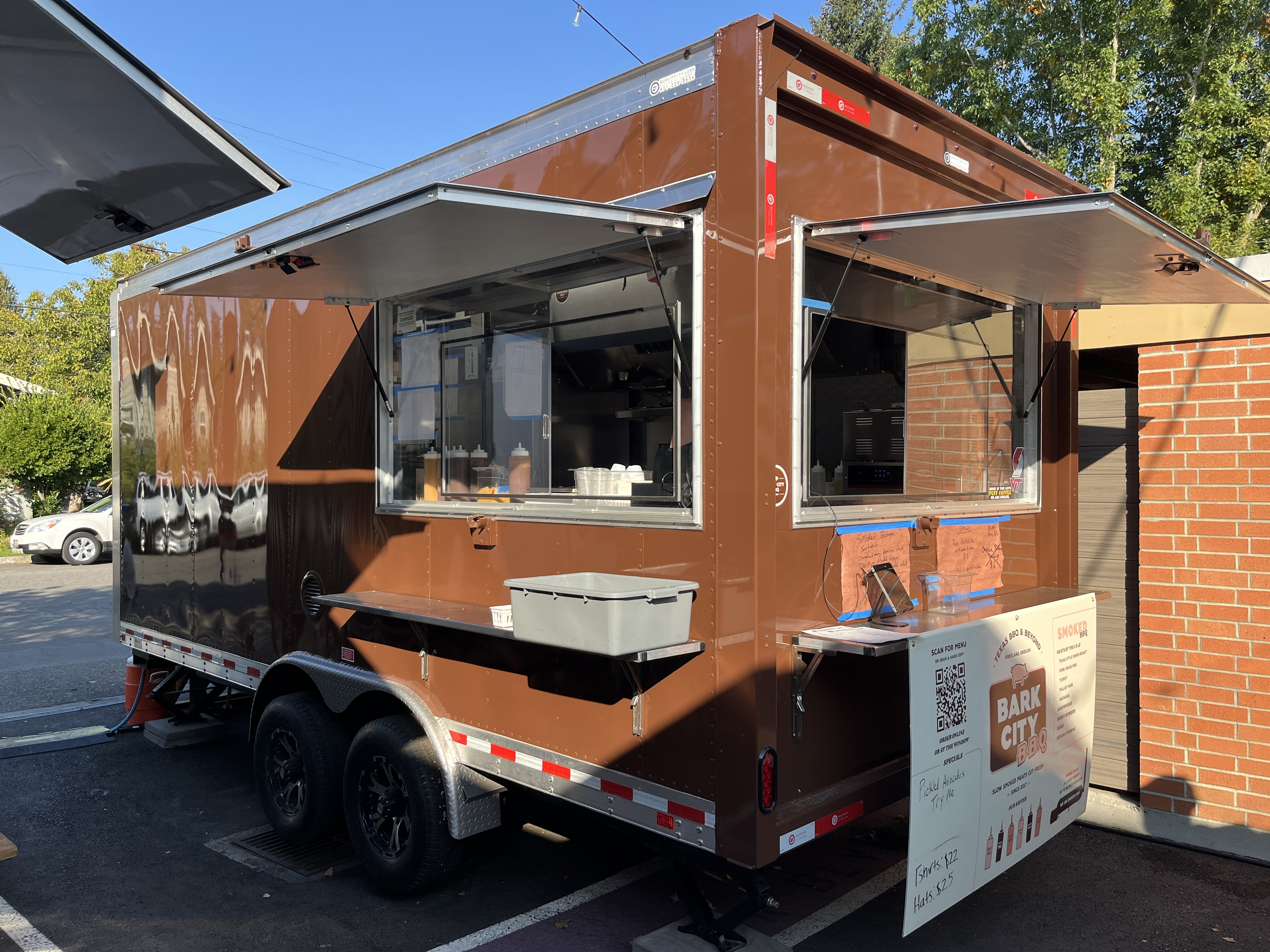
- Food cart at The Heist in Portland's Woodstock neighborhood, 2024
- Interactive map of Bark City BBQ

Restaurant information
- Location: Portland, Multnomah, Oregon, 97202, United States
- Coordinates: 45.4965°N 122.6266°W
- Website: barkcitybbq.com

Bark City BBQ is a barbecue restaurant in Portland, Oregon, United States.

== History ==
Bark City closed in 2022, but reopened in the food cart pod called The Heist in southeast Portland's Woodstock neighborhood in 2024.

== Reception ==
The business was named 2018 Food Cart of the Year by Eater Portland. Bark City ranked third in the Best Food Cart category of Willamette Week's annual 'Best of Portland' readers' poll in 2018. Katherine Chew Hamilton included the business in Portland Mercury's 2026 list of the city's top twenty food carts.

== See also ==
- Barbecue in the United States
- List of barbecue restaurants
