= Belmont Station (bar) =

Drinking establishment in Portland, Oregon, U.S.

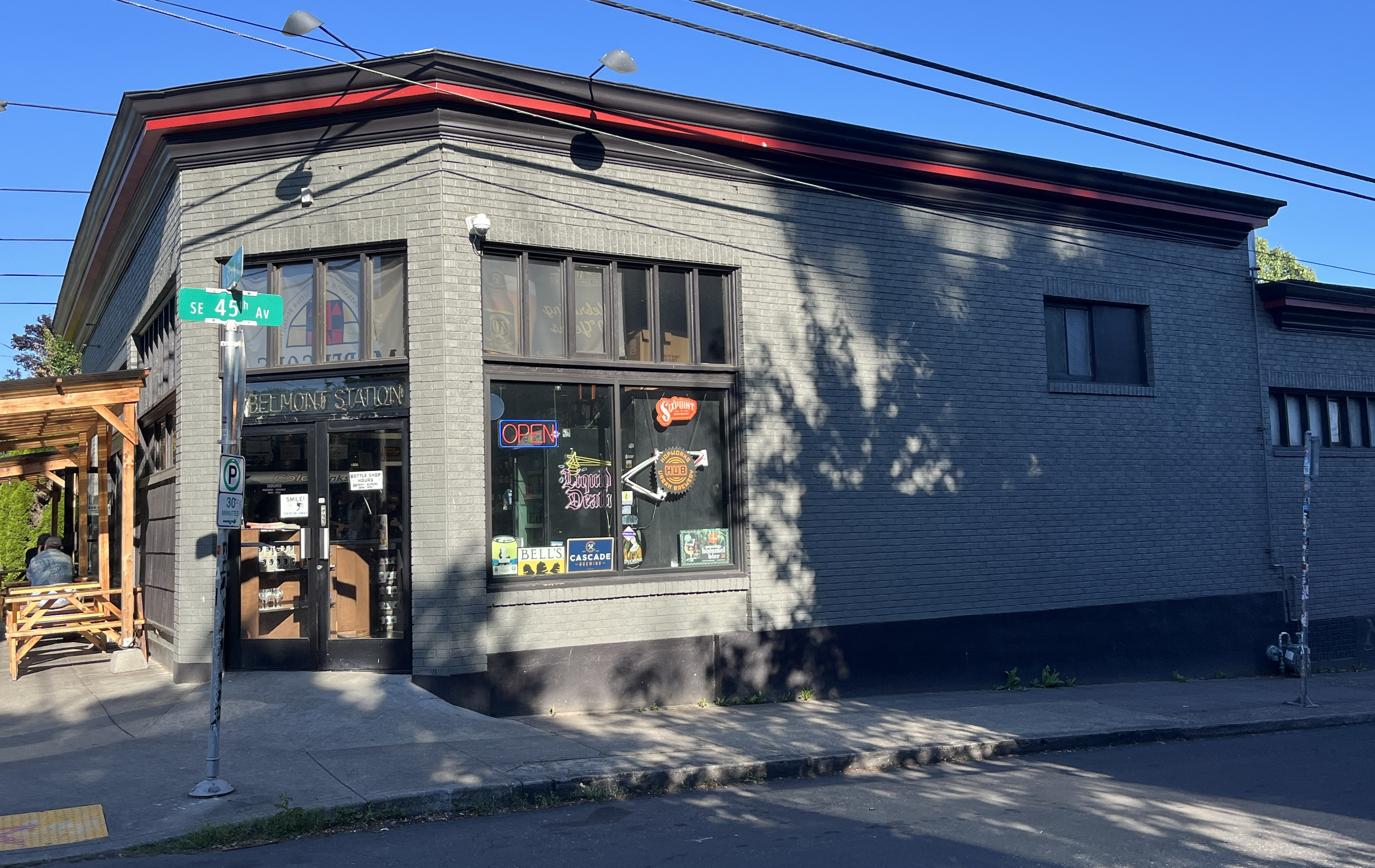
- The bar's exterior, 2025
- Interactive map of Belmont Station

Restaurant information
- Established: 1997
- Location: 4500 Southeast Stark Street, Portland, Multnomah, Oregon, 97215, United States
- Coordinates: 45°31′09″N 122°36′58″W
- Website: belmont-station.com

Belmont Station is a bar and bottle shop in Portland, Oregon. It operates at the intersection of Stark Street and 45th Avenue, in southeast Portland's Sunnyside neighborhood.

== Description and history ==
Belmont Station opened in 1997, and stocks approximately 1,200–1,500 bottles of craft beer. It relocated from Belmont to Stark in 2007. The bar hosts events throughout the year, such as Puckerfest. It has also hosted a food cart on-site.

== Reception ==
Belmont Station placed second in the Best Bottle Shop category of Willamette Week's annual 'Best of Portland' readers' poll in 2025.
