= BG's Food Cartel =

Food cart pod in Beaverton, Oregon, U.S.

Coordinates: 45°29′21.5″N 122°48′30″W

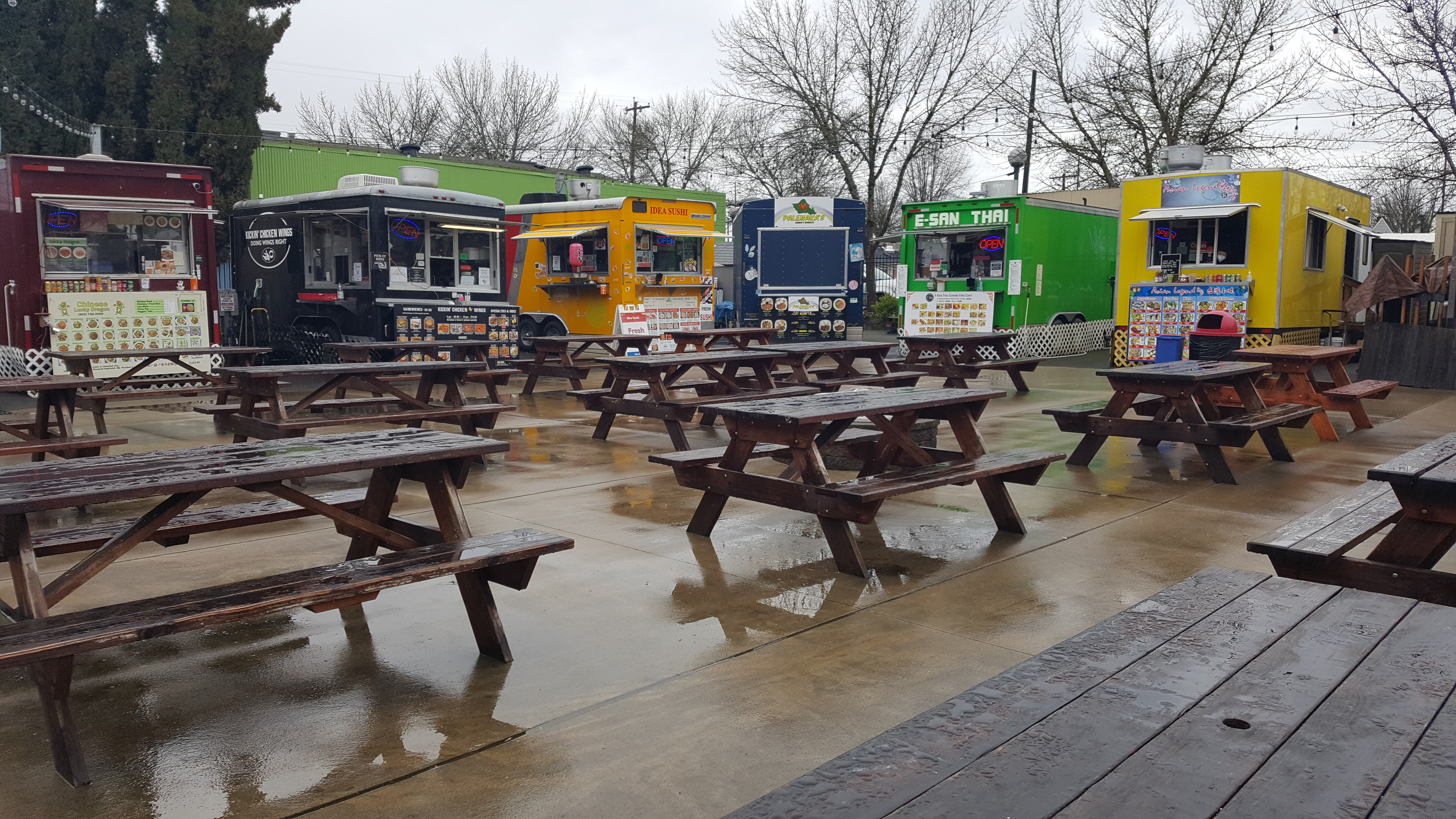
- Food carts in 2022
- Interactive map of BG's Food Cartel

Restaurant information
- Location: Beaverton, Oregon, United States

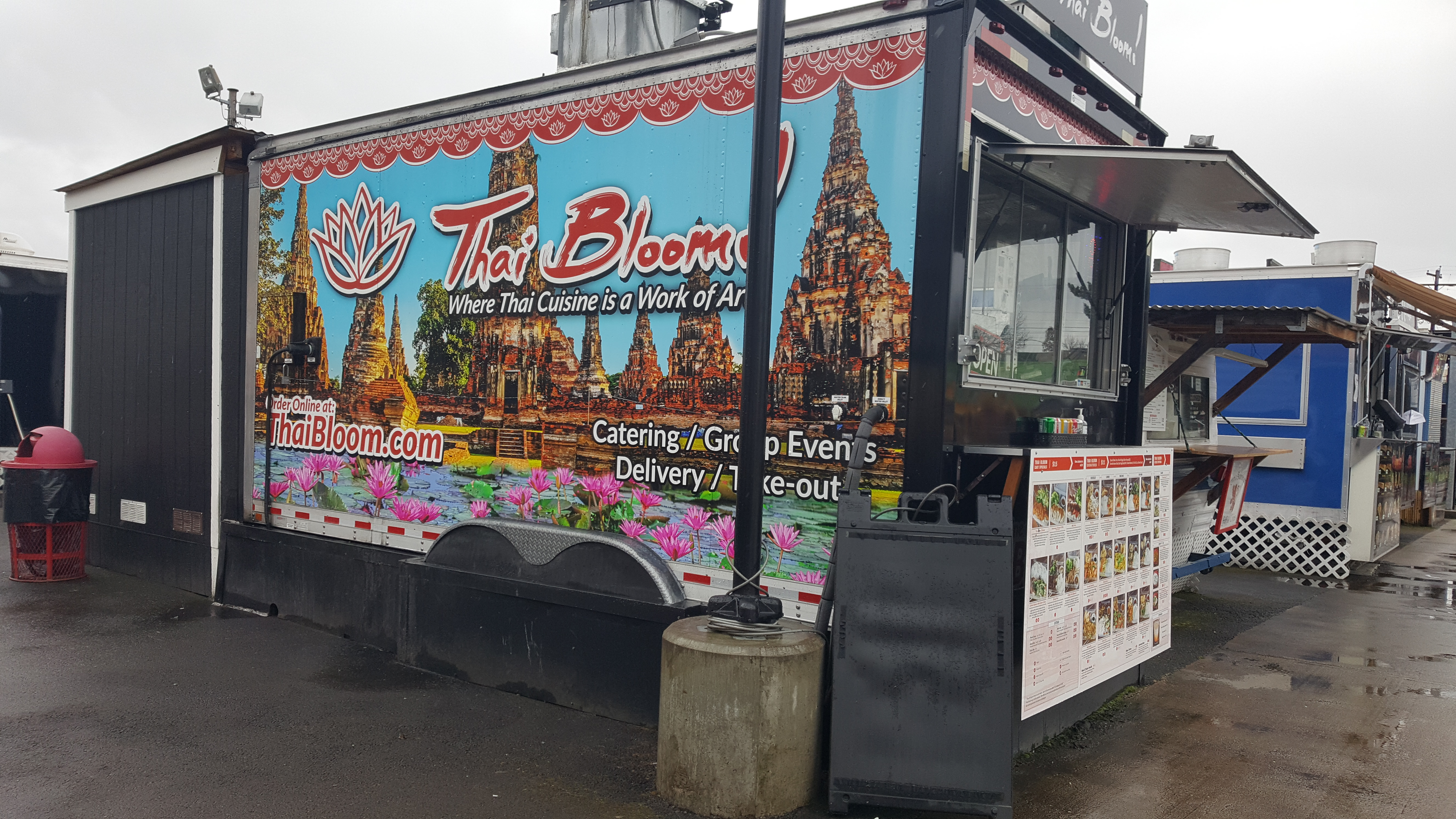
Thai Bloom, 2022

BG's Food Cartel (sometimes BG Food Cartel) is a food cart pod near The Round in Beaverton, Oregon, United States. The pod opened as Beaverton's first in 2018. Business have included:

- Avenue Saint Charles
- Burger Stevens
- Cocina Mexico Lindo
- E-san Thai Cuisine
- Fry Bar
- Le Bistro Montage Ala Cart
- Mama's Peruvian Bowls
- Oh My Crepe
- Smaaken Waffle Sandwiches

== Reception ==
Katherine Chew Hamilton and Brooke Jackson-Glidden included BG's in Eater Portland's 2025 list of the best restaurants and food cart pods for large groups.

== See also ==
- Food carts in Portland, Oregon
