= Kim Jong Grillin' =

Korean restaurant in Portland, Oregon, U.S.

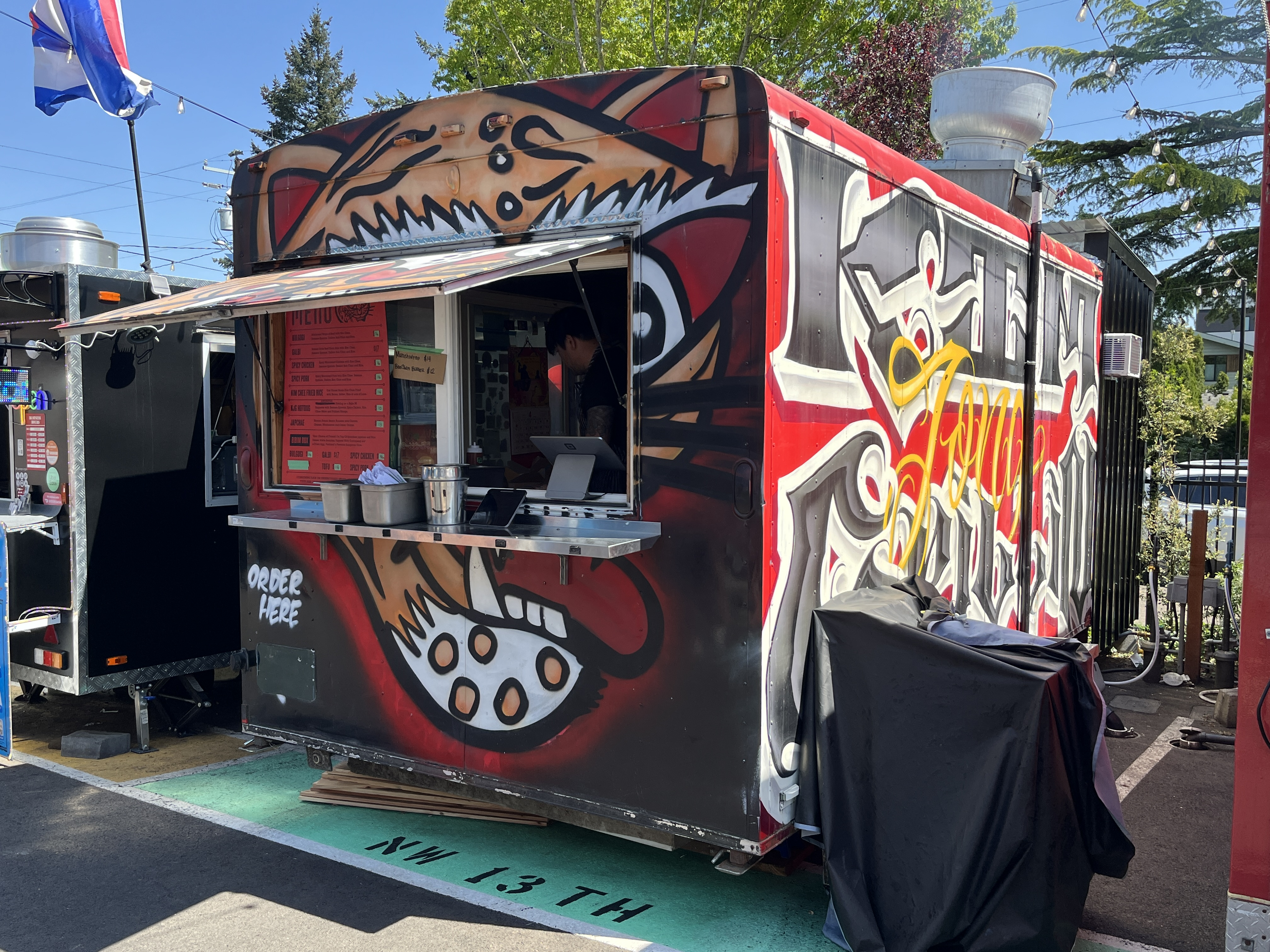
- The food cart at The Heist in southeast Portland, Oregon, 2025
- Interactive map of Kim Jong Grillin'

Restaurant information
- Owner: Han Ly Hwang
- Chef: Han Ly Hwang
- Food type: Korean
- Location: 4606 Southeast Division Street, Portland, Oregon, United States
- Coordinates: 45.523°N 122.679°W
- Website: kimjonggrillin.com

Kim Jong Grillin' is a Korean restaurant in Portland, Oregon, United States. In 2025, the food cart operated at 770 West Burnside Street and at The Heist in southeast Portland's Woodstock neighborhood.

Previously, the business operated in southeast Portland's Richmond neighborhood in 2022. Plans to expand with a stall in the food hall at Block 216 did not come to fruition. Kim Jong Grillin' has also operated a brick and mortar restaurant in Happy Valley, but the location closed permanently in March 2025.

== Description ==
Kim Jong Grillin' serves Korean cuisine, including bulgogi, galbi, and japchae.

== History ==
Kim Jong Grillin' is owned by chef Han Ly Hwang. The food cart caught fire in 2011. The business began operating again in 2014.

According to Chad Walsh of Eater Portland, Kim Jong Grillin' sold 60–80 pounds of short ribs, 130 pounds of bulgogi, 470–500 pounds of meat, and 250 pounds of kimchi per week as of mid 2016. In June 2016, the business confirmed plans to close on Alberta and collaborate with Matt's BBQ. Kim Jong Grillin' was burglarized in December 2016.

In 2017, Hwang confirmed plans to open Kim Jong Grillin' Ssam at Cartopia, a food cart pod in southeast Portland.

In 2020, during the COVID-19 pandemic, Kim Jong Grillin' served free meals to unemployed restaurant workers. The business planned to operate a stall in the food hall at Block 216, as of 2023. However, the project did not come to fruition. Kim Jong Grillin' moved to the Cart Blocks in downtown Portland and announced plans to operate a brick and mortar restaurant in Happy Valley. The Happy Valley location closed permanently in March 2025. In 2025, the Kim Jong Grillin' food cart operated on West Burnside Street and at The Heist in southeast Portland's Woodstock neighborhood.

== Reception ==
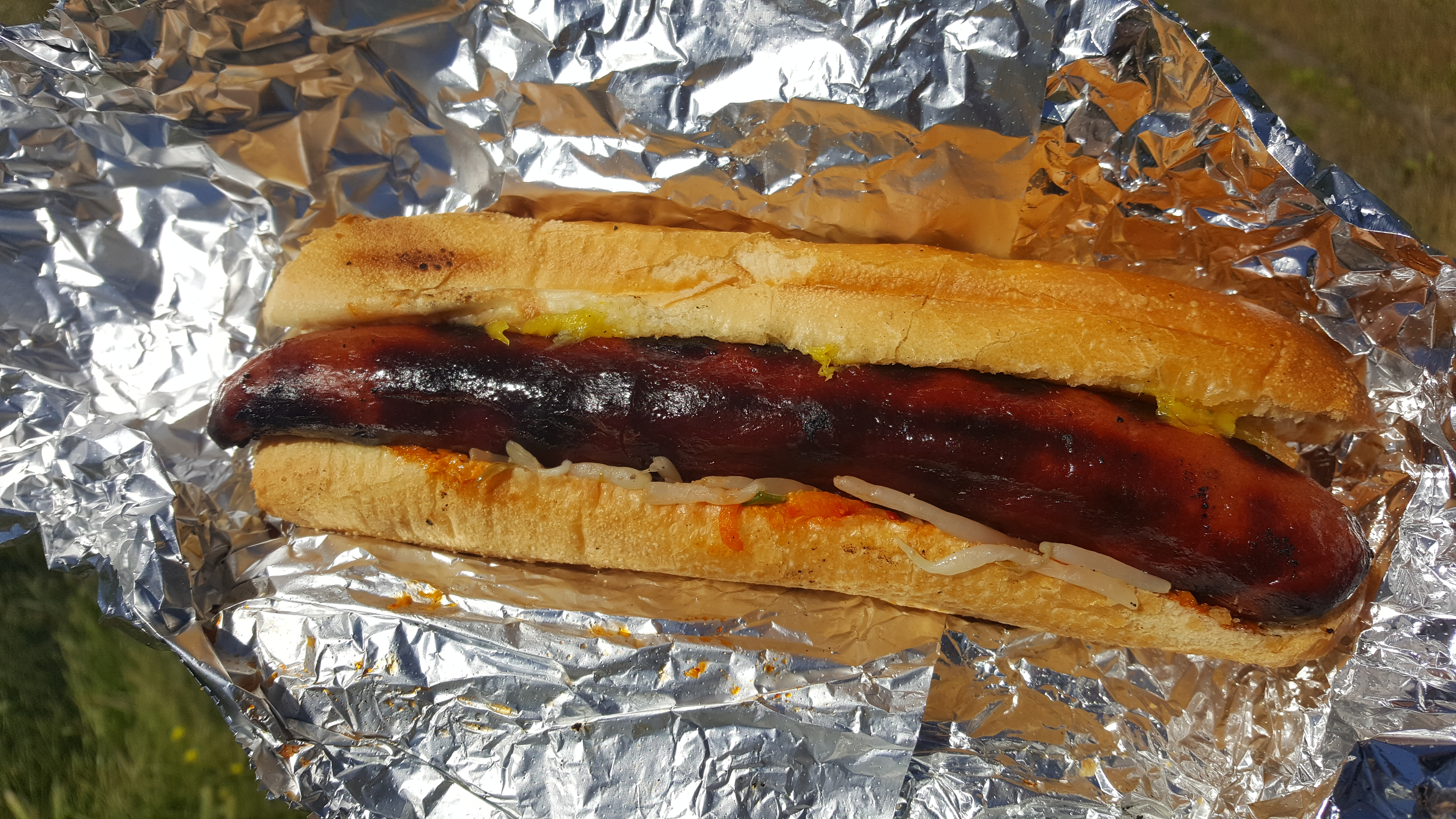
KJG hot dog, 2022

In 2016, Eater Portland described the restaurant as "enormously popular". The restaurant was named in multiple Eater Portland lists in 2021, including Nick Townsend's "15 Restaurants Worth Visiting on SE Division", Nick Woo and Brooke Jackson-Glidden's "15 Outstanding Portland Food Carts", and Jackson-Glidden's "The 38 Essential Restaurants and Food Carts in Portland". The website's Nathan Williams included Kim Jon Grillin' in a 2023 list of the city's "snappiest, juiciest" hot dogs. Brooke Jackson-Glidden included the KJG Hot Dog in a 2024 overview of "iconic" Portland dishes. The business was also included in the website's 2025 overview of Portland's best food carts.

Katherine Chew Hamilton and Nick Campigli included the restaurant in Portland Monthly's 2021 list of 7 "must-try hot dog hotspots", writing: "The KJG hot dog is a must-have if you're looking for mild heat and Korean American flair. The spicy daikon, kimchi mayo, and pickled mango are excellent additions to the longstanding American tradition of putting meat (in this case, Zenner's sausage) inside a bun." Hamilton also included the business in Portland Mercury's 2026 list of the city's top twenty food carts. In their book Raw Dog: The Naked Truth About Hot Dogs, journalist, TV writer and comedian Jamie Loftus included Kim Jong Grillin's hot dog in their top five favorite hot dogs in the United States.

== See also ==
- History of Korean Americans in Portland, Oregon
- List of food trucks
- List of Korean restaurants
