= Lost Lake (Hood River County, Oregon) =

Lake in Hood River County, Oregon, United States

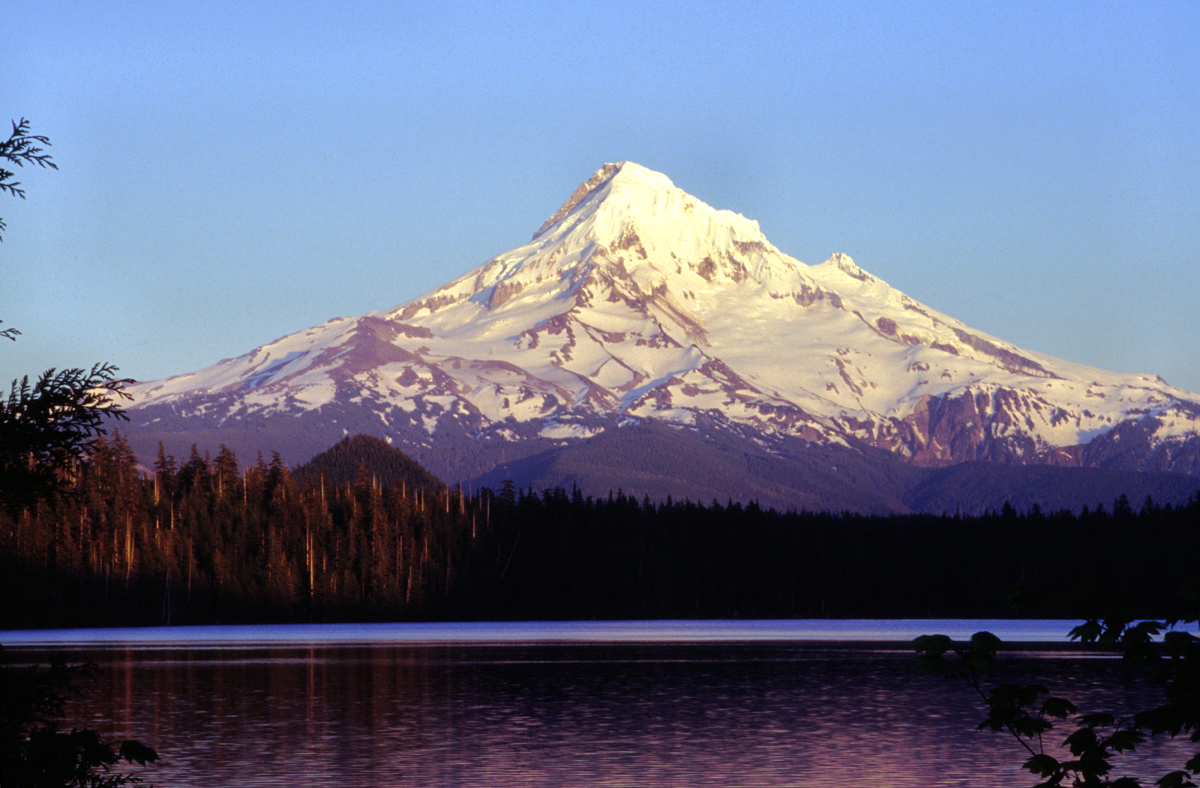
- Famous View of Lost Lake, Mount Hood in the distance

- Location within Oregon Location within the United States
- Location: Hood River County, Oregon
- Coordinates: 45°29′23″N 121°49′21″W
- Primary outflows: Lake Branch Hood River (Source)
- Basin countries: United States
- Max. length: 5,395 ft (1,644 m)
- Max. width: 4,150 ft (1,260 m)
- Surface area: 245 acres (99.1 ha)
- Max. depth: 167 ft (51 m)
- Surface elevation: 3,146 ft (959 m)
- Frozen: occasionally
- Islands: (none)
- Settlements: (none)

Lost Lake is a lake in Mount Hood National Forest 10.1 miles (16.2 km) northwest of Mount Hood in Hood River County in the U.S. state of Oregon. It is 21.4 miles (34.4 km) southwest of Hood River, a 26.4-mile (42.5 km) drive.

The lake is bounded on the east by 4,468-foot (1,362 m) Lost Lake Butte and on the southwest by 4,556-foot (1,389 m) Preachers Peak. The lake is fed by three unnamed intermittent creeks from Lost Lake Butte, and Inlet Creek from Preachers Peak. The lake maintains a very consistent level via an outlet at the north tip, the source of Lake Branch Hood River, a tributary of West Fork Hood River. It is the second-deepest lake in Mount Hood National Forest after Wahtum Lake at 167 feet (51 m).

== Recreation ==
The lake is a popular recreational site, with 125 primitive campsites, seven rustic cabins, and a rustic general store. The resort's normal season is May through October. Canoes, row boats, and kayaks are available for rental; motor craft are not allowed. A day use fee applies to all vehicles entering the area, payable to the concessionaire.

Astrophotography has become a popular activity at Lost Lake with the rise of social media attracting photographers to capture the Milky Way and Mount Hood.

== Wildlife ==
The lake contains brook trout, brown trout, kokanee salmon, rainbow trout, crayfish, otter, and beaver. Throughout the area are blacktail deer, Roosevelt elk, squirrels, chipmunks, rabbits, black bear, cougar, and bobcat. The heavily forested area consists mostly of Douglas-fir and mountain hemlock with some cedar and white pine. Alder and huckleberry underbrush occurs in open areas.

== Protection ==
The area is a part of the proposed Lewis and Clark Mount Hood Wilderness which would prevent development, logging, mining, and likely would require the removal of structures and roads.

== History ==
Native Americans called the lake E-e-kwahl-a-mat-yam-lshkt (heart of the mountains). The name Lost Lake came from Mack Hollamon, who was a hunting and fishing guide during the turn of the 19th century. He had guided for many years throughout Mount Hood but did not come across the lake until Native Americans later showed him where it was. So he called it Lost Lake on his future trips.

== Gallery ==
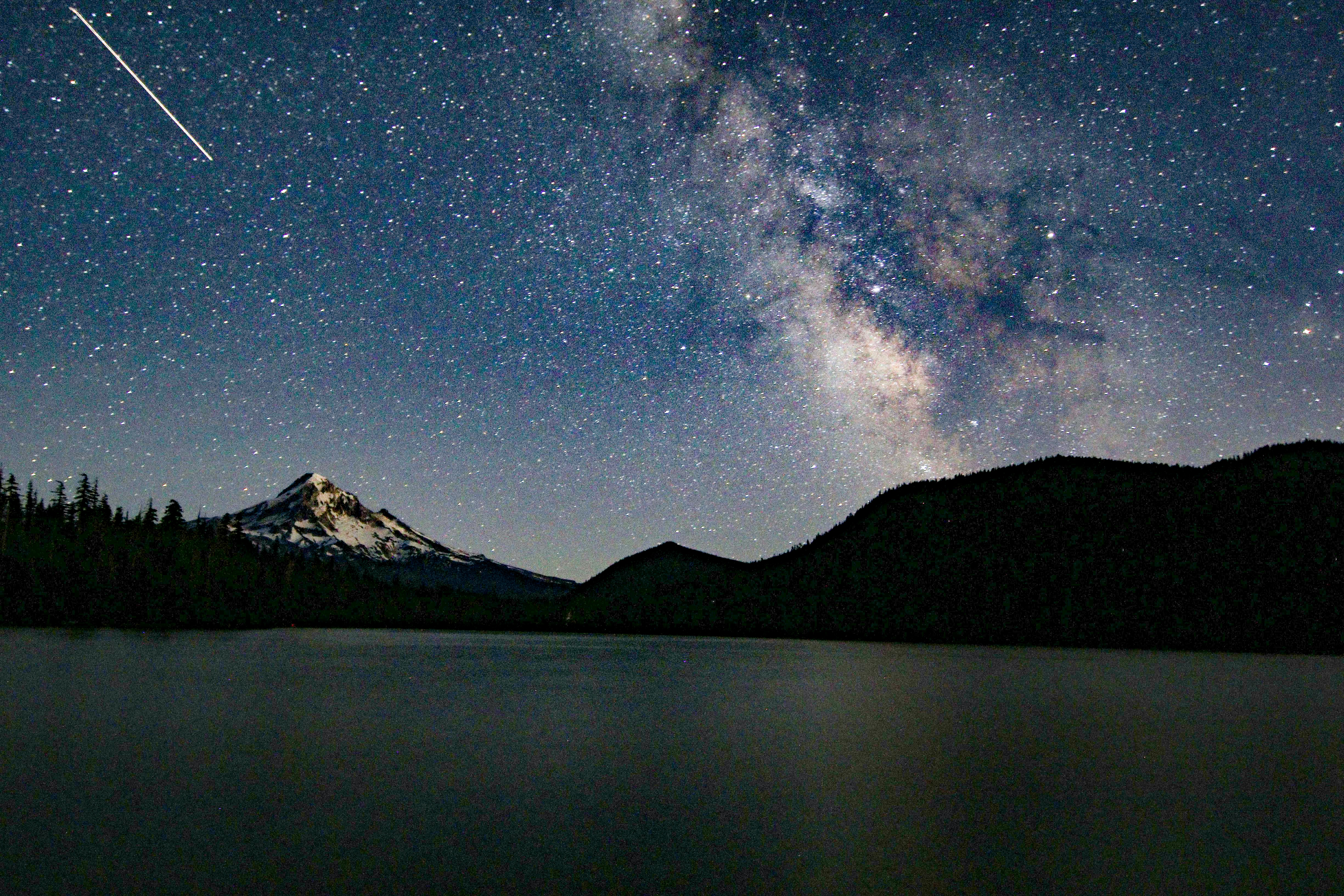
Lost Lake Milky Way Photography

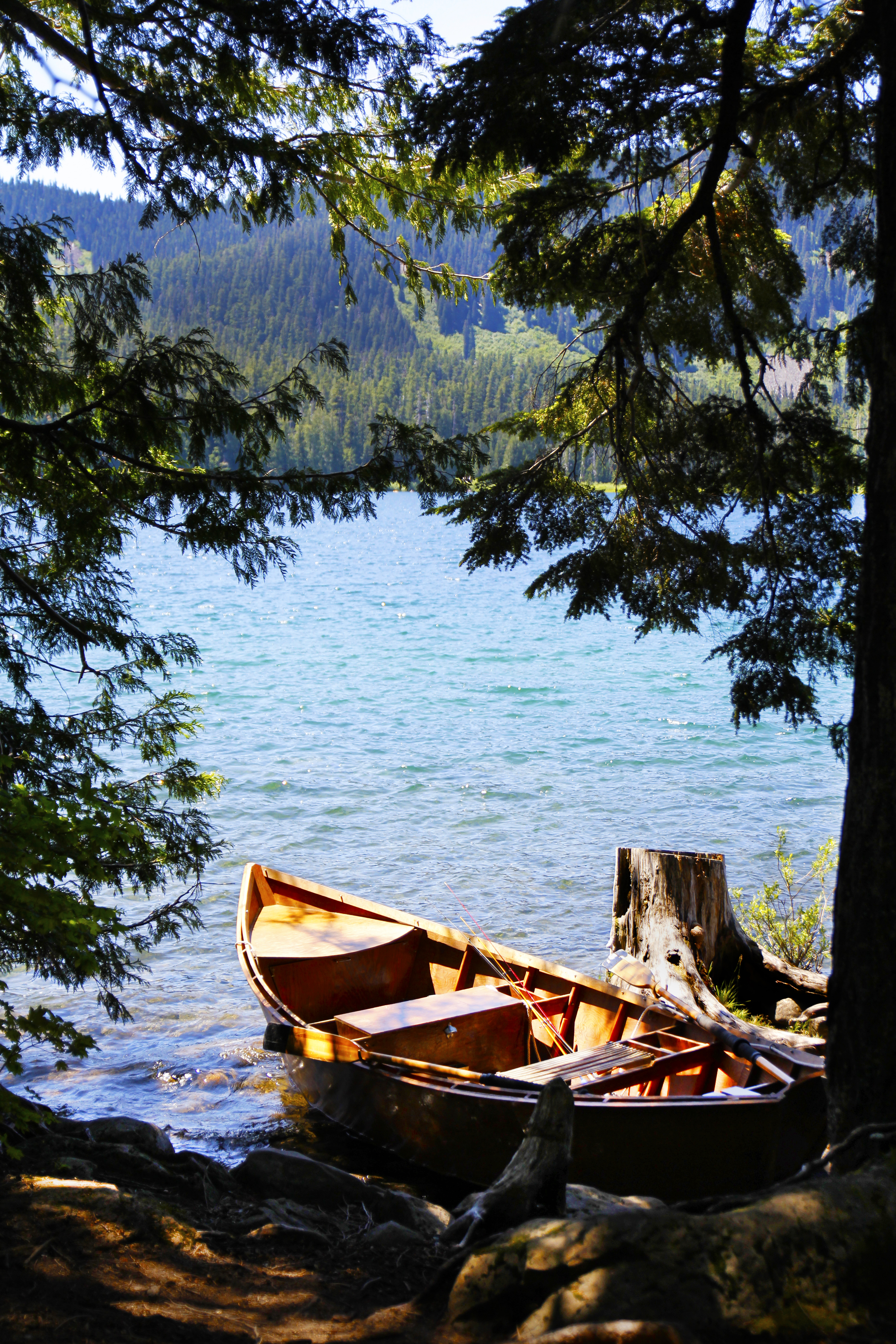
Rowboat at Lost Lake

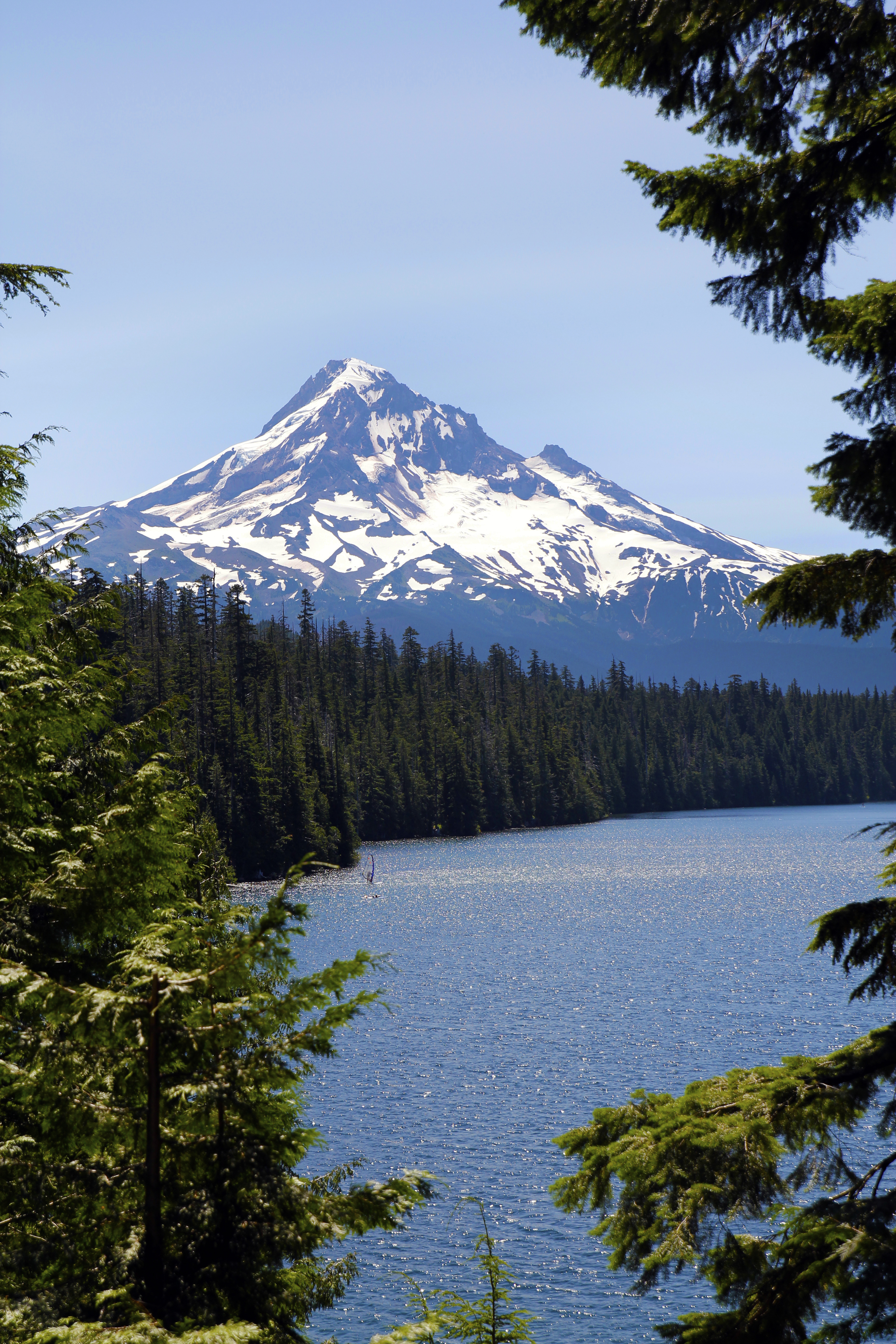
Mount Hood and Lost Lake

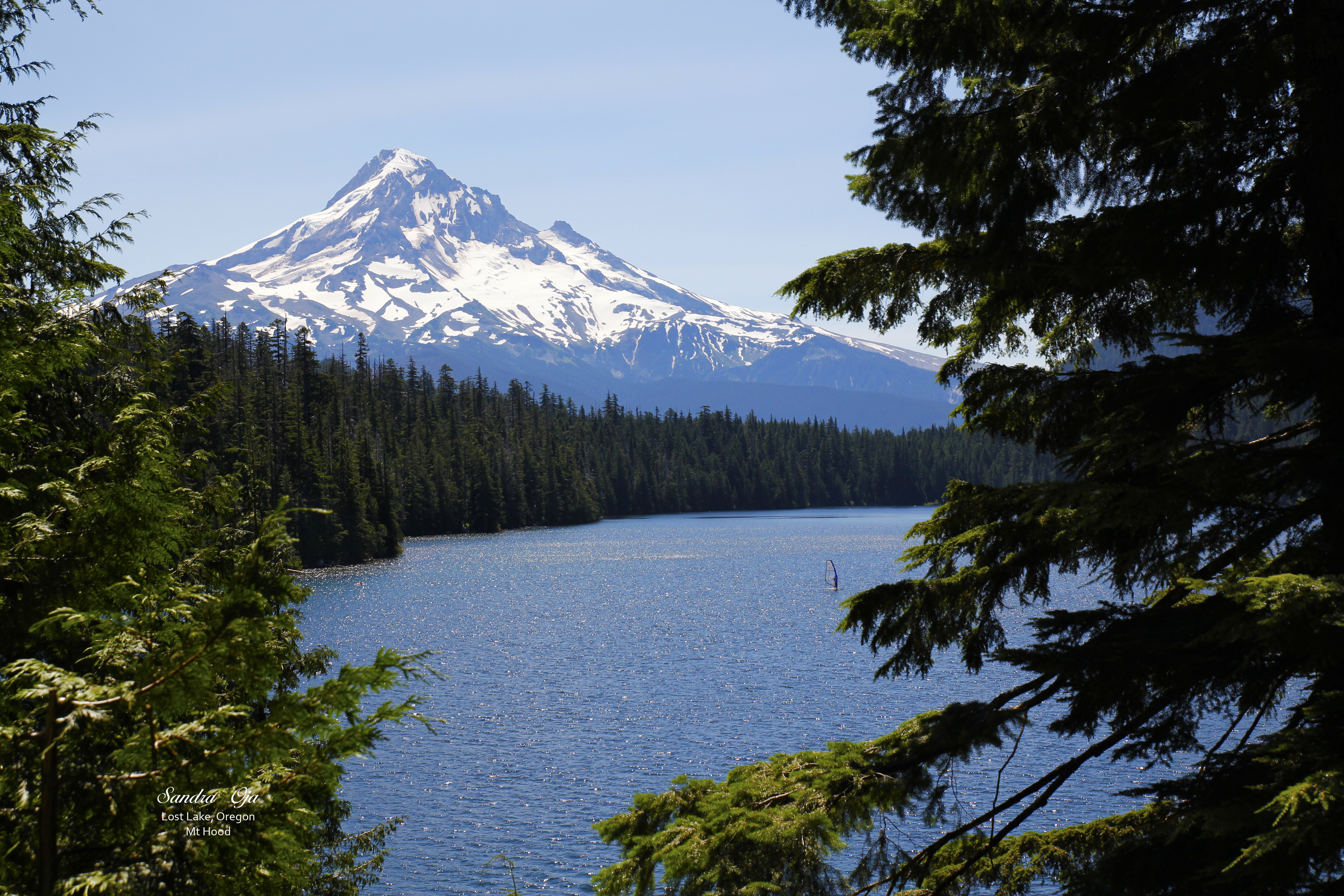
Windsurfer on Lost Lake with Mount Hood in the background

== See also ==
- List of lakes in Oregon
