= Punch Bowl Falls =

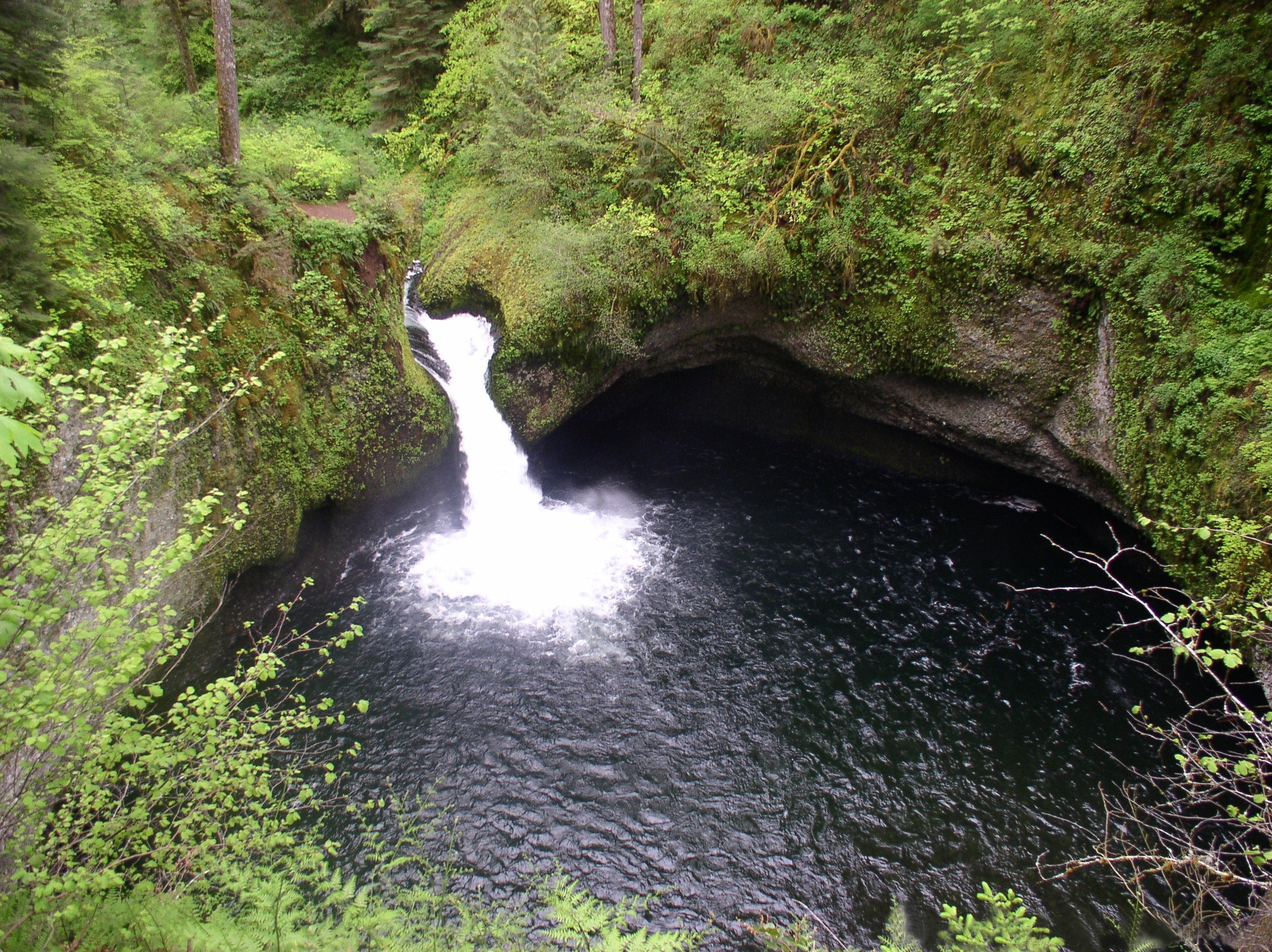
- Punch Bowl Falls on May 11, 2005.

- Location within Oregon Location within the United States
- Coordinates: 45°37′19″N 121°53′36″W
- Type: Punchbowl
- Total height: 35 feet (11 m)
- Total width: 10 feet (3.0 m)
- Watercourse: Eagle Creek

Punch Bowl Falls is a waterfall on Eagle Creek in the Columbia River Gorge National Scenic Area, Oregon, United States. Eagle Creek drains into the Columbia River, with its outlet on the Columbia River Gorge in Multnomah County.

The falls is 35 feet (11 m) tall and 10 feet (3.0 m) wide. Eagle Creek cuts through a narrow channel and shoots powerfully into a large bowl that resembles a punchbowl. This waterfall was responsible for the waterfall classification type of punchbowl.

These falls are not to be confused with another set of falls with the same name, found in Jasper National Park, Alberta, Canada near Miette Hot Springs.

In 2017, the cliff on the left side of the creek collapsed between Punch Bowl and Lower Punch Bowl Falls. Debris from the landslide changed the stream's flow between waterfalls.

A little up the river, there is a dilapidated wooden staircase leading to a concrete fish ladder.

== Nearby waterfalls ==
- Metlako Falls
- High Bridge Falls
- Sorenson Falls
- Tish Creek Falls
- Twister Falls

== Gallery ==
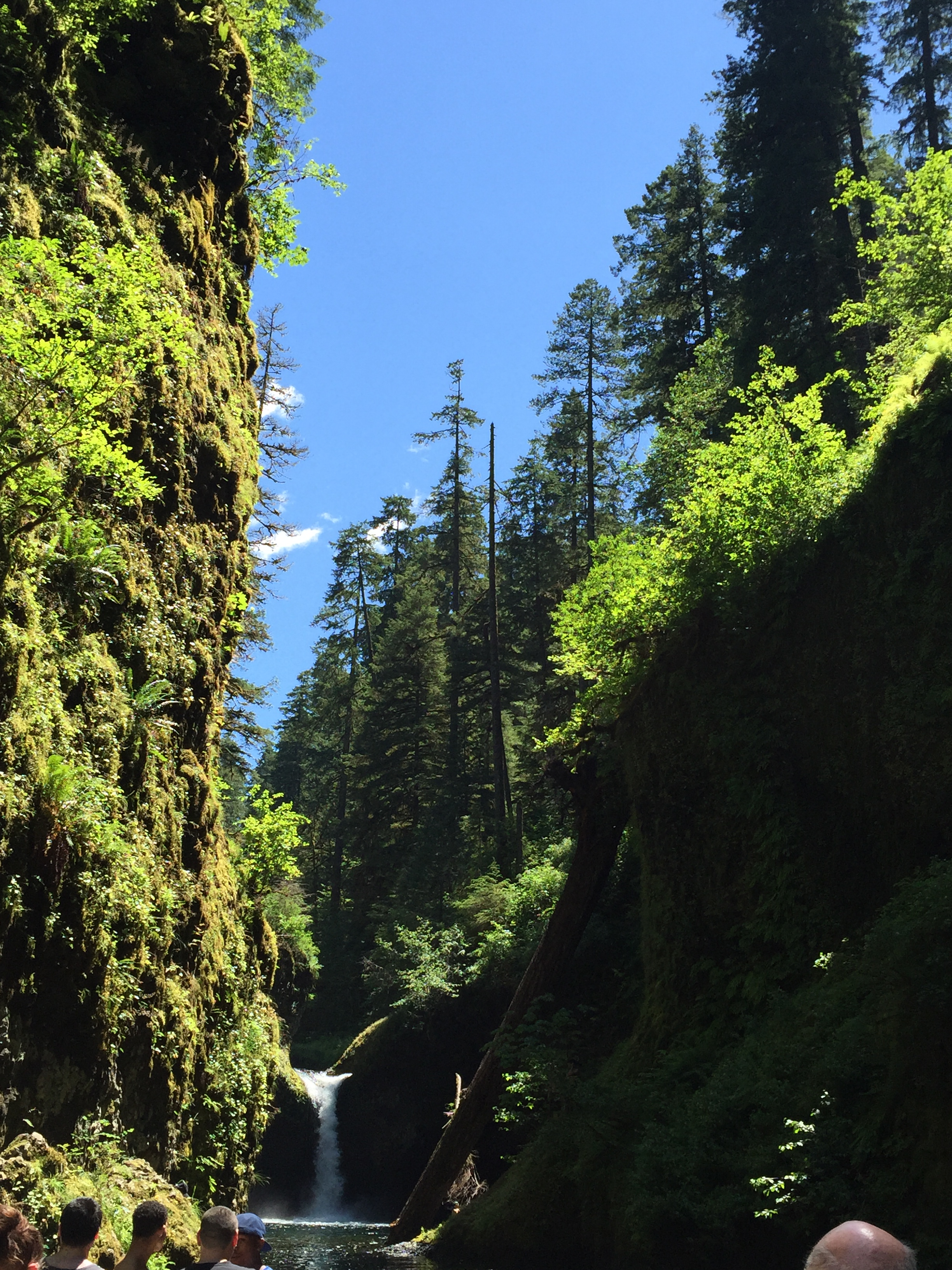
July afternoon in Punchbowl Falls

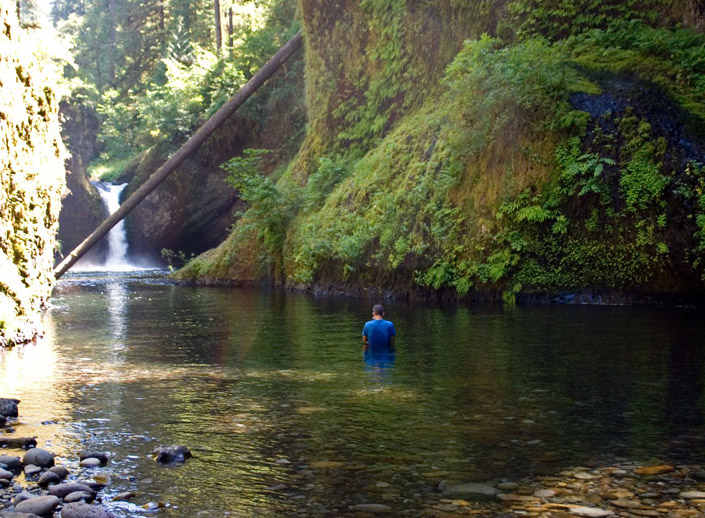
Punch Bowl Falls is a popular photography subject

== See also ==
- List of waterfalls on Eagle Creek and its tributaries
