= Wy'east Falls =

Coordinates: 45.5927°N 121.8644°W

- Interactive map of Wy'east Falls
- Location: Hood River County, Oregon, United States
- Type: Plunge
- Total height: 140 ft (43 m)
- Number of drops: 1

Wy'east Falls (also Wyeast Falls or Wy East Falls) is a waterfall on a small tributary of Eagle Creek in Hood River County, Oregon, U.S.

The waterfall is formed by Wy'East Creek, a spring-fed stream that plunges 140 feet (43 m) over the Eagle Creek basalt formation. The creek cuts through a narrow and steep ravine and spills off a basalt ledge, plunging in a thin sheet about 10 feet (3.0 m) wide, into a shallow, gravelly pool. The creek then flows for about 300 feet (91 m) before emptying into Eagle Creek shortly downstream of Tunnel Falls.

== Name ==
The waterfall was named Wy'east after the nearby campsite, which in turn takes its name from the local indigenous name for the nearby volcano Mount Hood.

== See also ==
- List of waterfalls on Eagle Creek and its tributaries
