= Tanner Creek Butte =

Mountain in Oregon, United States of America

- Location within Oregon

Highest point
- Elevation: 4,478 ft (1,365 m)
- Prominence: 580 ft (180 m)
- Parent peak: Table Mountain, Oregon
- Coordinates: 45°34′00″N 121°54′26″W

Geography
- Location: Mount Hood National Forest; Columbia River Gorge National Scenic Area; Mark O. Hatfield Wilderness; Multnomah County; Hood River County
- Parent range: Cascades
- Topo map: Tanner Butte

Climbing
- Easiest route: Tanner Butte Trail

Tanner Butte, officially Tanner Creek Butte, is a peak on the boundary between Hood River and Multnomah counties in Oregon, on the edge of the Columbia River Gorge. Its 4,478 feet (1,365 m) elevation makes it the highest point in the western Gorge. Tanner Butte is the high point on Tanner Ridge, a north-south ridge separating the Tanner and Eagle Creek drainages from each other. It is located in a remote area of the Mark O. Hatfield Wilderness, a wilderness area within the Mount Hood National Forest, on the boundary of the Bull Run Watershed.

The peak is only reachable by trail, with no roads leading to the area, and is over nine miles from the nearest trailhead. The Tanner Butte Trail #401 ascends Tanner Butte by following Tanner Ridge for eight miles from the closed Tanner Creek Road (Forest Road 8400-777). The Eagle-Tanner Trail #433 climbs the other side of the butte for five miles from a junction with the Eagle Creek Trail #440. The Tanner Cutoff Trail #448 and Eagle Creek Trail connects Tanner Butte to the rest of the Gorge's trail network.

The Tanner Butte area was severely impacted by the Eagle Creek Fire of 2017, with nearly the entire north face experiencing a severe burn severity. Due to the increased risk of landslides, debris flows, and other hazards, recreation in the area remains closed as of January 2019.
