= Wahclella Falls =

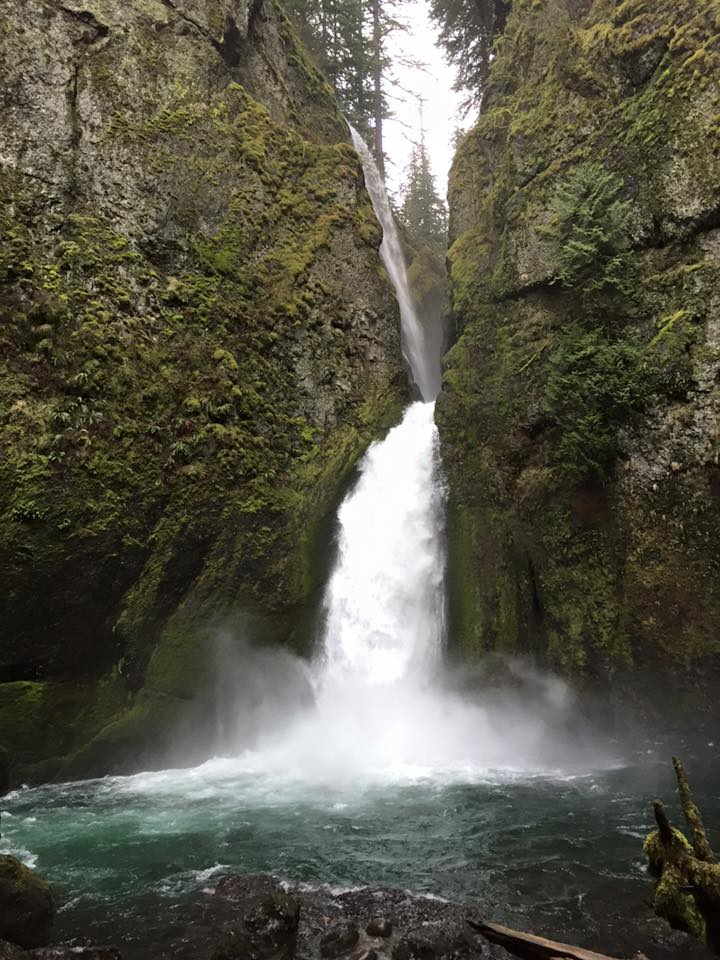
- Wahclella Falls
- Interactive map of Wahclella Falls
- Location: Columbia River Gorge; Multnomah Falls, Oregon; United States
- Coordinates: 45°37′4.5″N 121°56′59.7″W
- Type: Tiered
- Total height: 350 ft (107 m)
- Number of drops: 2
- Longest drop: 60 ft (18 m)

Wahclella Falls is a waterfall along Tanner Creek, a tributary of the Columbia River, Multnomah County, Oregon, United States. It enters the river within the Columbia River Gorge.

== Description ==
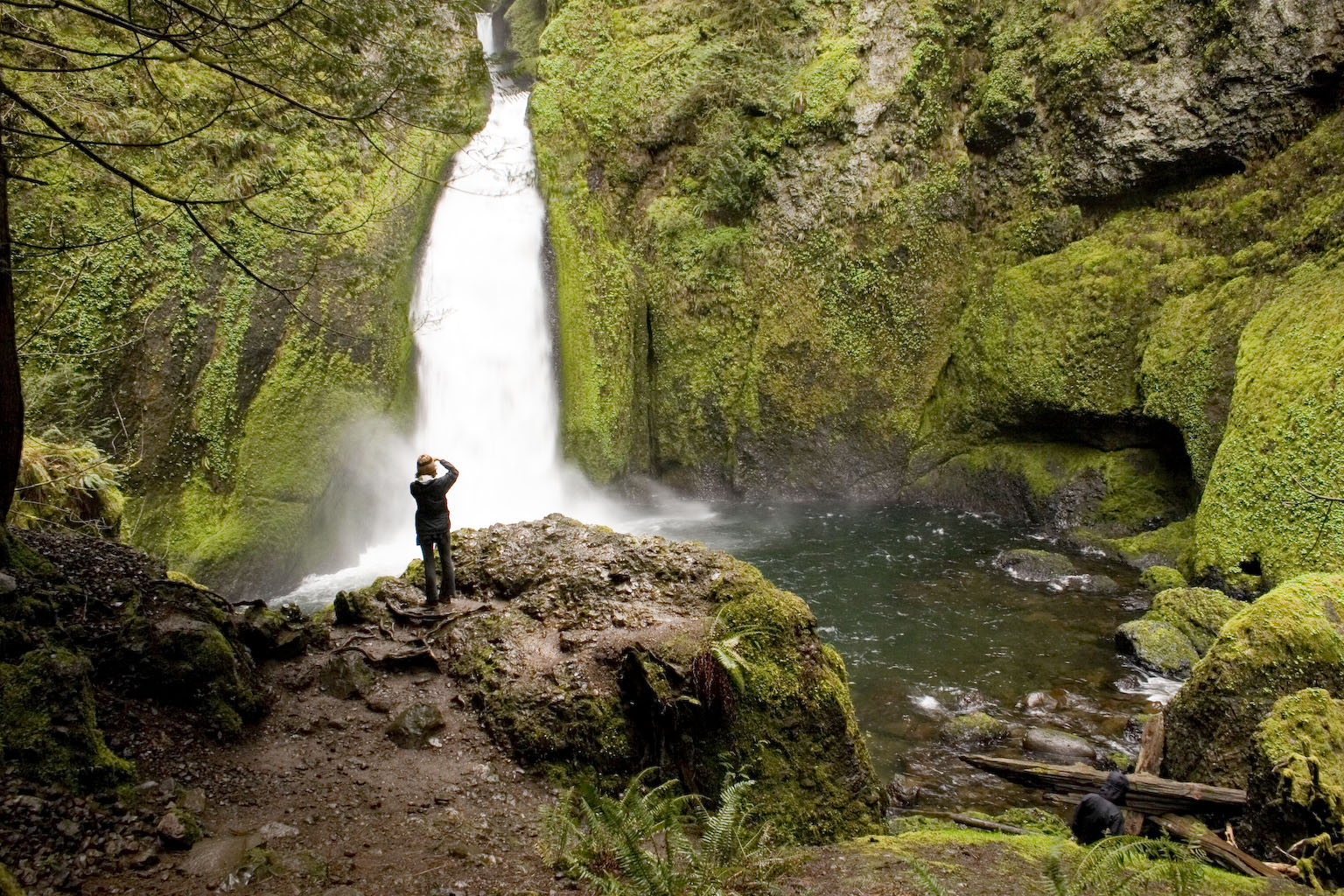
Wahclella Falls, April 2007

The Columbia River Highway splits around Exit #40 that leads to the Bonneville Dam. The parking and access area for Wahclella Falls is slightly down the hill and to the right (for eastbound traffic) of the entrance to the dam.

Wahclella is at the midpoint of the well maintained trail number 436 loop that forms a 1.8-mile (2.9 km) roundtrip. The falls are divided into upper and lower segments with a combined height of 350 ft (107 m), the upper section is not completely visible while the fully visible lower segment stands 60 feet (18 m) in height as it thunders out of a narrow gorge carved through dark gray basalt.

The plunge pool has a picturesque quality due to the surrounding natural walls that form a semi-circular rotunda extending from the falls to the main vantage point. As with most waterfalls, Wahclella does exhibit some seasonality of water flow. However, because Tanner Creek is sourced primarily by an underground spring, the flow is never dramatically affected by adverse weather.

Wahclella Falls was named after a nearby village of Native Americans by the Mazama mountaineering club in 1915.

The United States Forest Service charges a fee or requires a pass for parking at the trail head.

== See also ==
- List of waterfalls in Oregon
