= Metlako Falls =

Coordinates: 45.6253°N 121.8968°W

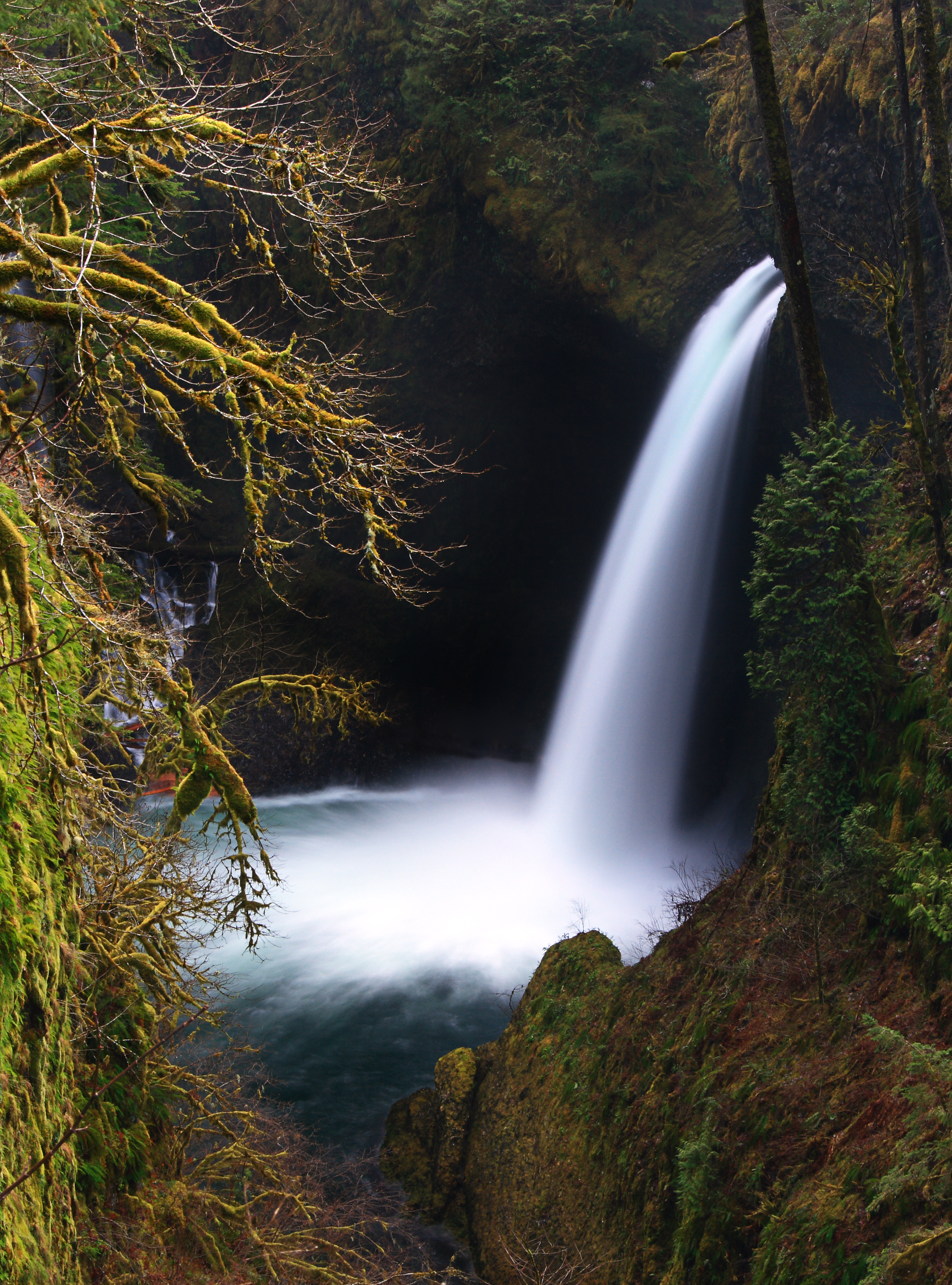
- Interactive map of Metlako Falls
- Location: Eagle Creek, Columbia River Gorge National Scenic Area, Hood River County, Oregon, United States
- Type: Punchbowl
- Total height: 31 m (101 ft)
- Number of drops: 1
- Longest drop: 31 m (101 ft)
- Total width: 6.1 m (20 ft)

Metlako Falls is a waterfall on Eagle Creek in the Columbia River Gorge National Scenic Area in Hood River County, Oregon, United States. It is the furthest downstream of the major waterfalls on Eagle Creek. Like upstream Punch Bowl Falls, Metlako is also in the form of a punchbowl. The falls is 31 meters (101 ft) tall, though people have measured it anywhere from 30 to 46 m (100 to 150 ft) tall. It is the upstream limit for salmon spawning in Eagle Creek.

== Naming ==
The waterfall was discovered and named by a committee of the Mazamas in 1915 after Metlako, the Indian goddess of salmon, likely because it is the upstream limit for salmon spawning in Eagle Creek.

== 2016 Landslide ==
At the end of 2016 landslide destroyed official viewpoint, so title photo view of waterfall is not possible anymore. Eagle Creek Fire in 2017 burned trees around waterfall. It makes extremely difficult (and dangerous) to scramble to the edge of the cliff, however, due to lack of foliage top of Metlako Falls is now visible from a trail. Spring 2022 Update: local hikers asked Forest Service to develop alternative viewpoint. Work is not started yet.

== See also ==
- List of waterfalls on Eagle Creek and its tributaries

== Sources ==
- http://www.waterfallsnorthwest.com/waterfall.php?num=1561&p=0
- http://www.waterfallswest.com/or_metlako.html
