= Eagle Creek (Columbia River tributary) =

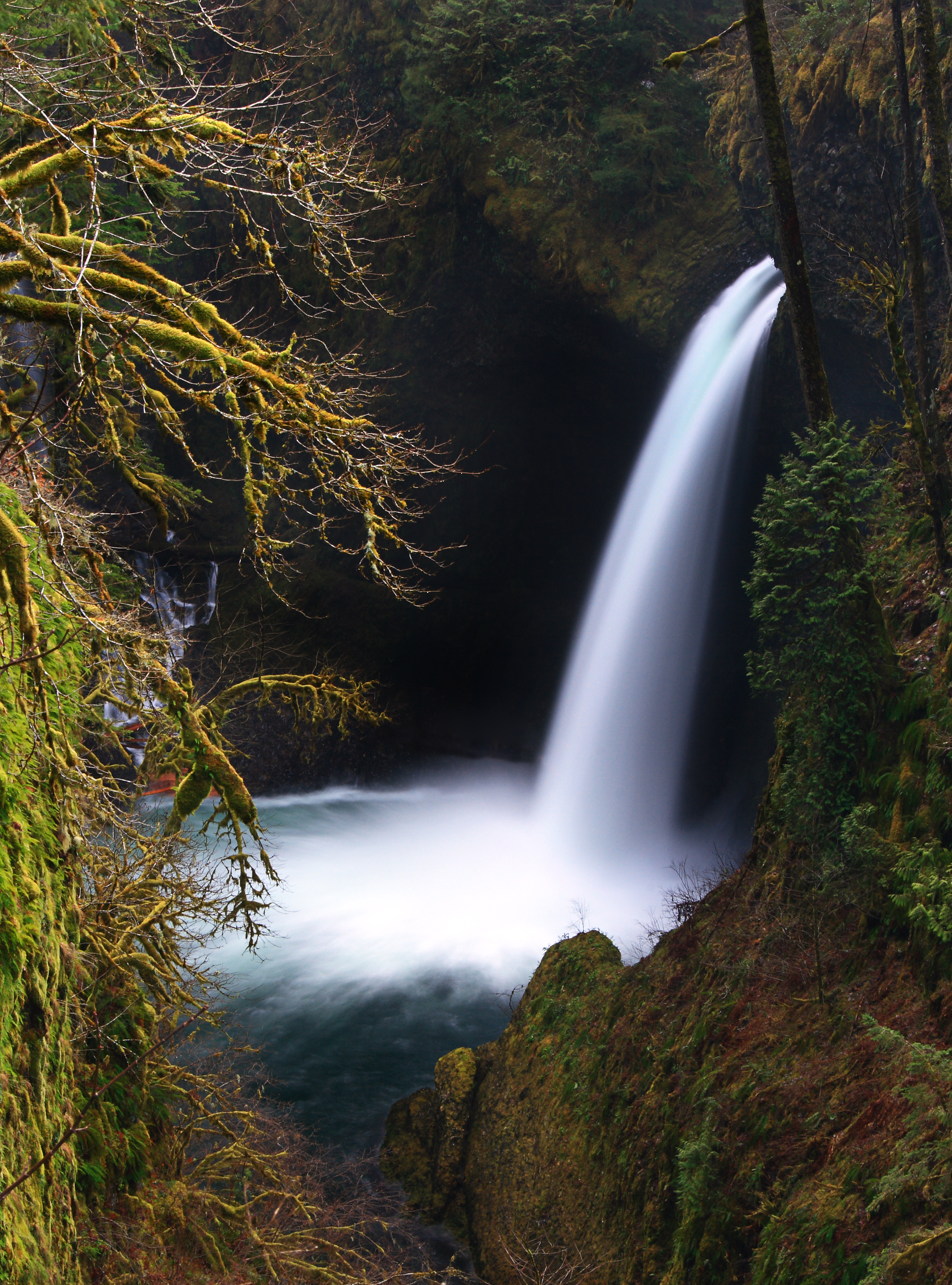
- Metlako Falls on Eagle Creek

- Location of the mouth of Eagle Creek in Oregon

Location
- Country: United States
- State: Oregon
- County: Hood River County

Physical characteristics
- Source
  - location: Thrush Pond near Eagle Butte
  - coordinates: 45°32′58″N 121°54′15″W
  - elevation: 3,455 feet (1,053 m)
- 2nd source
  - location: Wahtum Lake
  - coordinates: 45°34′52″N 121°47′56″W
  - elevation: 3,727 feet (1,136 m)
- Mouth: Columbia River east of Bonneville Dam
  - location: Oregon
  - coordinates: 45°35′26″N 121°55′57″W
  - elevation: 79 feet (24 m)

Basin features
- Progression: Eagle Creek → Columbia River → Pacific Ocean

Eagle Creek is a creek located mainly in Hood River County, Oregon, in the Columbia River Gorge, with its last roughly 0.5 miles (0.80 km) and mouth in Multnomah County. A tributary of the Columbia River, the creek flows for approximately 15 miles (24 km) from the Thrush Pond between Eagle Butte and Tanner Butte to its mouth near Bonneville Dam. The East Fork Eagle Creek is a major tributary that begins at Wahtum Lake and joins the main stem approximately 2/3 the way between the Thrush Pond and the Columbia River, separated by Indian Mountain.

== Drainage basin ==
The Eagle Creek drainage basin is the largest of any creek in the western or central Gorge. The watershed is bounded by Tanner Ridge to the west, the Benson Plateau and Chinidere Mountain to the east, and Indian Mountain and Waucoma Ridge to the south. Another major tributary is Opal Creek, flowing from Tanner Butte to just above Tenas Falls.

== Waterfalls ==
Eagle creek is notable for its numerous waterfalls. From the mouth upstream, the most notable are Metlako Falls, Punch Bowl Falls, Skoonichuk Falls, Grand Union Falls, Twister Falls, and Sevenmile Falls. Noteworthy waterfalls on Eagle Creek's many tributaries include Sorenson Falls, Loowit Falls, Four Mile Falls, Tenas Falls, Wy'east Falls, and Tunnel Falls.

== Eagle Creek Bridge ==
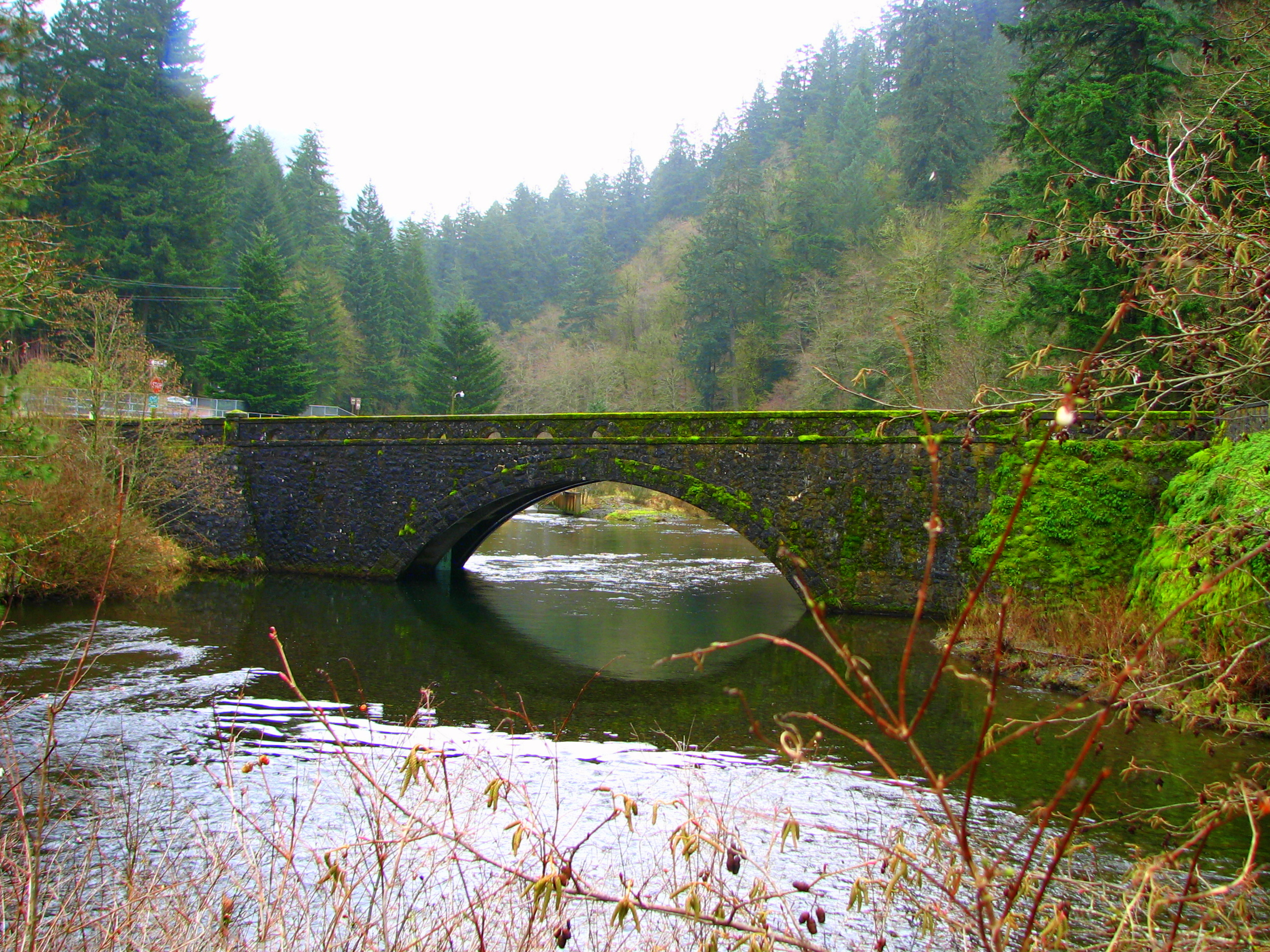
Eagle Creek Bridge, in 2010

The Eagle Creek Bridge is a contributing structure in the Columbia River Highway Historic District, which was listed on the National Register of Historic Places in 1983. It is self-evidently a closed spandrel arch bridge.

== Recreation ==
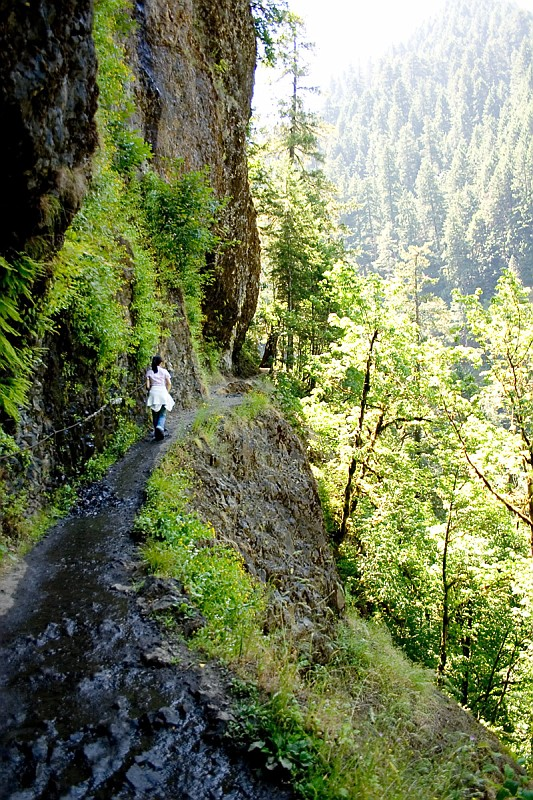
The Eagle Creek Trail #440 on the cliffs above Eagle Creek

Eagle Creek is an extremely popular recreation destination. The Eagle Creek Trail #440 runs for 13.1 miles (21.1 km) along the creek from the Historic Columbia River Highway State Trail to a junction with the Pacific Crest Trail near Wahtum Lake, and its lower reaches comprise one of the most popular trails in the Gorge. Multiple other trails are also present on the surrounding ridges and mountains, providing connections to the rest of the Gorge's trail network.

== History ==
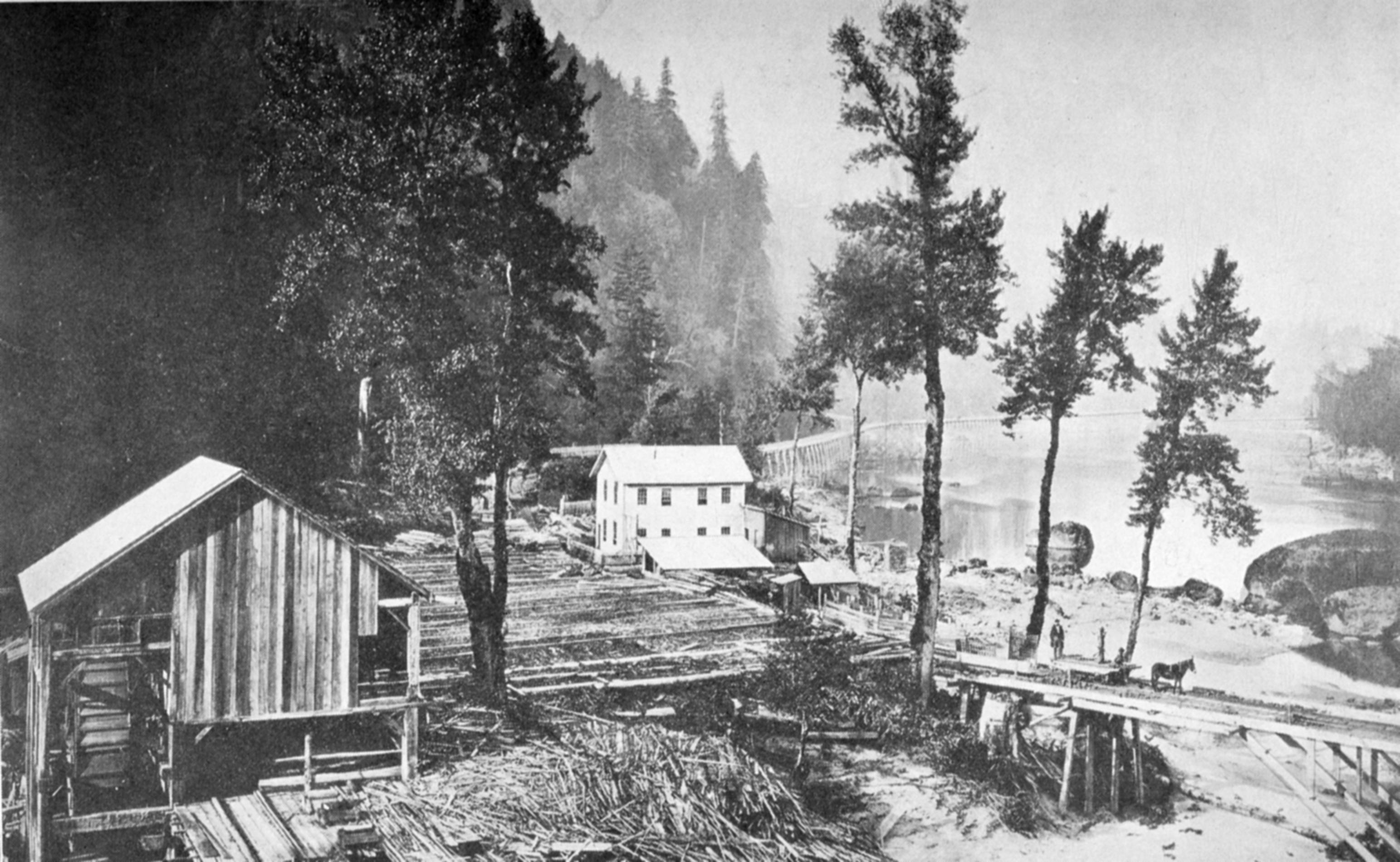
A bridge across Eagle Creek to carry the Oregon Portage Railroad, the first railroad in Oregon.

The Eagle Creek watershed was severely impacted by the Eagle Creek Fire of 2017, which started near Punch Bowl Falls after a 15-year-old threw a firecracker into the canyon following a prolonged period without precipitation. Due to the increased risk of landslides, debris flows, and other hazards, recreation in the area was closed until January 2021. The trail briefly reopened, but was closed again after two weeks after landslides caused by heavy rain.

== See also ==
- List of bridges documented by the Historic American Engineering Record in Oregon
- List of bridges on the National Register of Historic Places in Oregon
