= Tanner Creek (Columbia River tributary) =

- Location of the mouth of Tanner Creek in Oregon

Location
- Country: United States
- State: Oregon
- County: Multnomah County

Physical characteristics
- Source
  - location: Tanner Butte
  - coordinates: 45°32′44″N 121°57′39″W
  - elevation: 3,710 feet (1,130 m)
- Mouth: Columbia River west of Bonneville Dam
  - location: Oregon
  - coordinates: 45°37′57″N 121°57′39″W
  - elevation: 20 feet (6.1 m)

Basin features
- Progression: Tanner Creek → Columbia River → Pacific Ocean

Tanner Creek is a creek located in the Columbia River Gorge in Multnomah County, Oregon, United States, that is a tributary of the Columbia River.

== Description ==
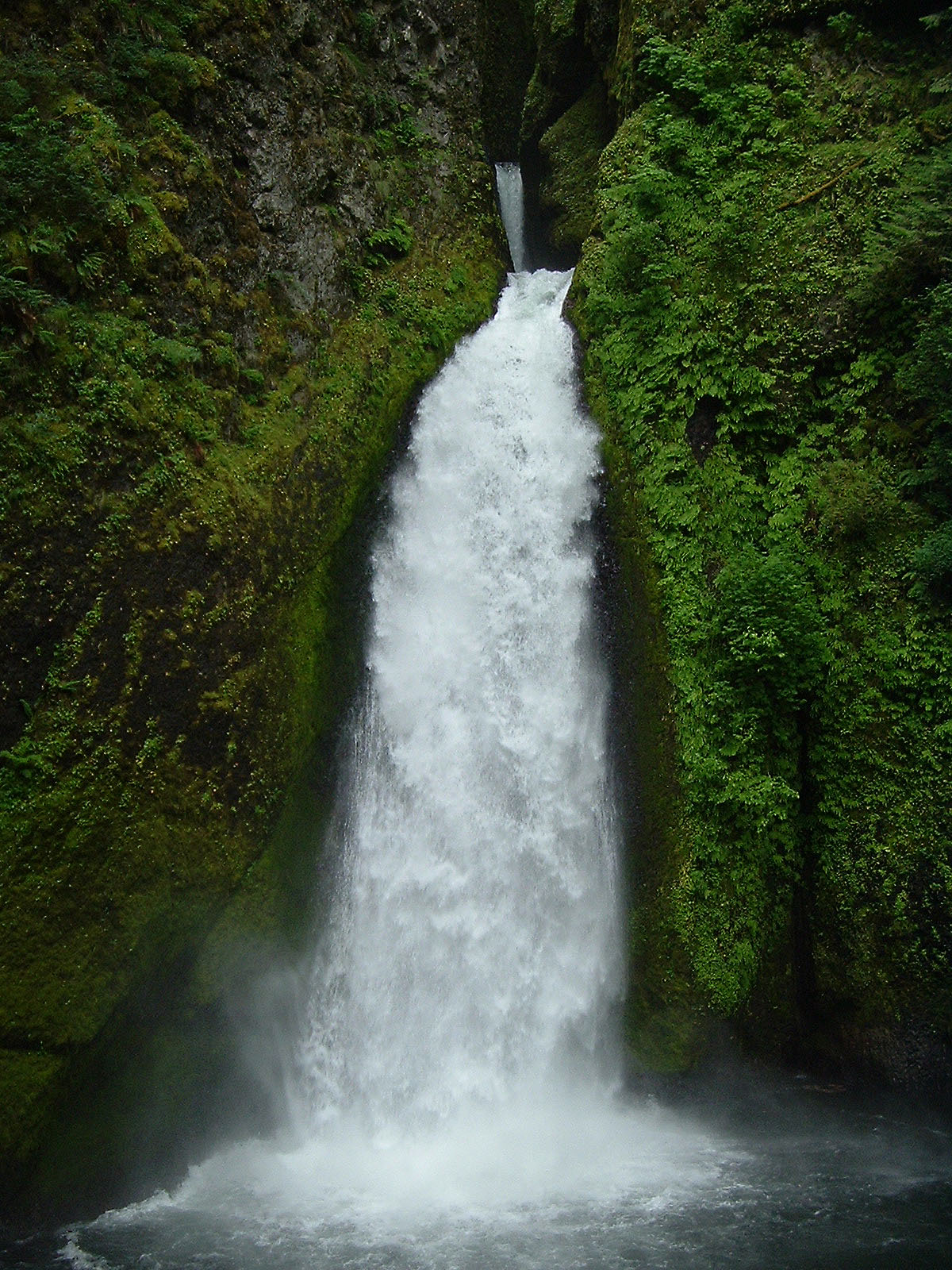
Wahclella Falls, along Tanner Creek, June 2006

The creek flows for approximately 6 miles (9.7 km) from Tanner Springs near Tanner Butte, the highest point in the western Gorge, to its mouth just to the west of Bonneville Dam. The watershed is bounded by Munra Ridge to the west and Tanner Ridge to the east.

The most notable feature of the creek is Wahclella Falls, a 350 feet (110 m) waterfall around 1.5 miles (2.4 km) from the mouth of the creek. The falls are a popular recreation destination, with the Wahclella Falls Trail #436 running for 2.4 miles along the creek from the Historic Columbia River Highway State Trail to the falls.

Further up the creek canyon, the remote Tanner Creek Trail #431 is a lightly travelled trail running along the creek from the end of the closed Tanner Creek Road (Forest Road 8400–777). Connections to the road, Tanner Cutoff Trail #448 and the Moffett Creek Trail #430 connect this trail with the remainder of the Gorge's trail network.

The Tanner Creek watershed was severely impacted by the Eagle Creek Fire of 2017, with a large portion of the canyon experiencing a severe burn severity. Due to the increased risk of landslides, debris flows, and other hazards, recreation in the area remains closed as of January 2019.

== See also ==
- List of rivers of Oregon
