= Twister Falls =

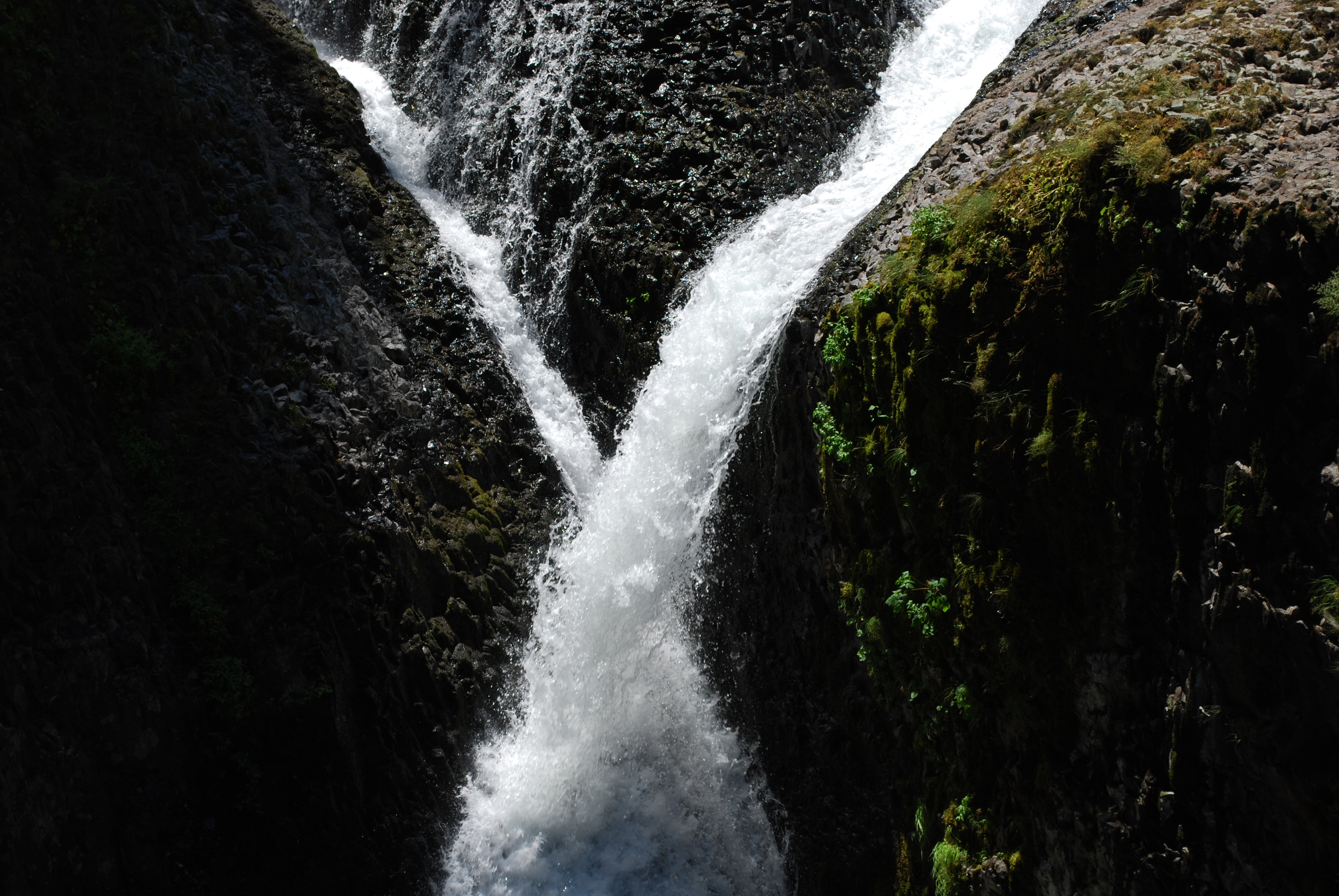
- Interactive map of Twister Falls
- Location: Hood River County, Oregon
- Coordinates: 45.582°N 121.852°W
- Type: Tiered
- Total height: 140 ft (43 m)
- Number of drops: 3

Twister Falls (also known as Crossover Falls, Crisscross Falls, Bowtie Falls, and Eagle Creek Falls) is a prominent waterfall that is formed as Eagle Creek cascades 140 feet (43 m) into a narrow canyon and forms two streams that appear to "twist" around each other, hence the name "twister". The falls begin with a small sliding cascade that drops 5 feet (1.5 m) over a rocky slope into a pool, followed by some rapids. The next tier is the twisting tier, which plunges 50 feet (15 m). Before this point, a small portion of the stream splits off and makes a sheer plunge of approximately equal height down the canyon. Then, the waters combine and form a final drop of 80 feet (24 m).

== Name ==
The waterfall has not been named by the USGS, but has been called Twister Falls for its unusual nature.

== See also ==
- List of waterfalls on Eagle Creek and its tributaries
