= Eagle Creek waterfalls =

In Oregon, U.S.

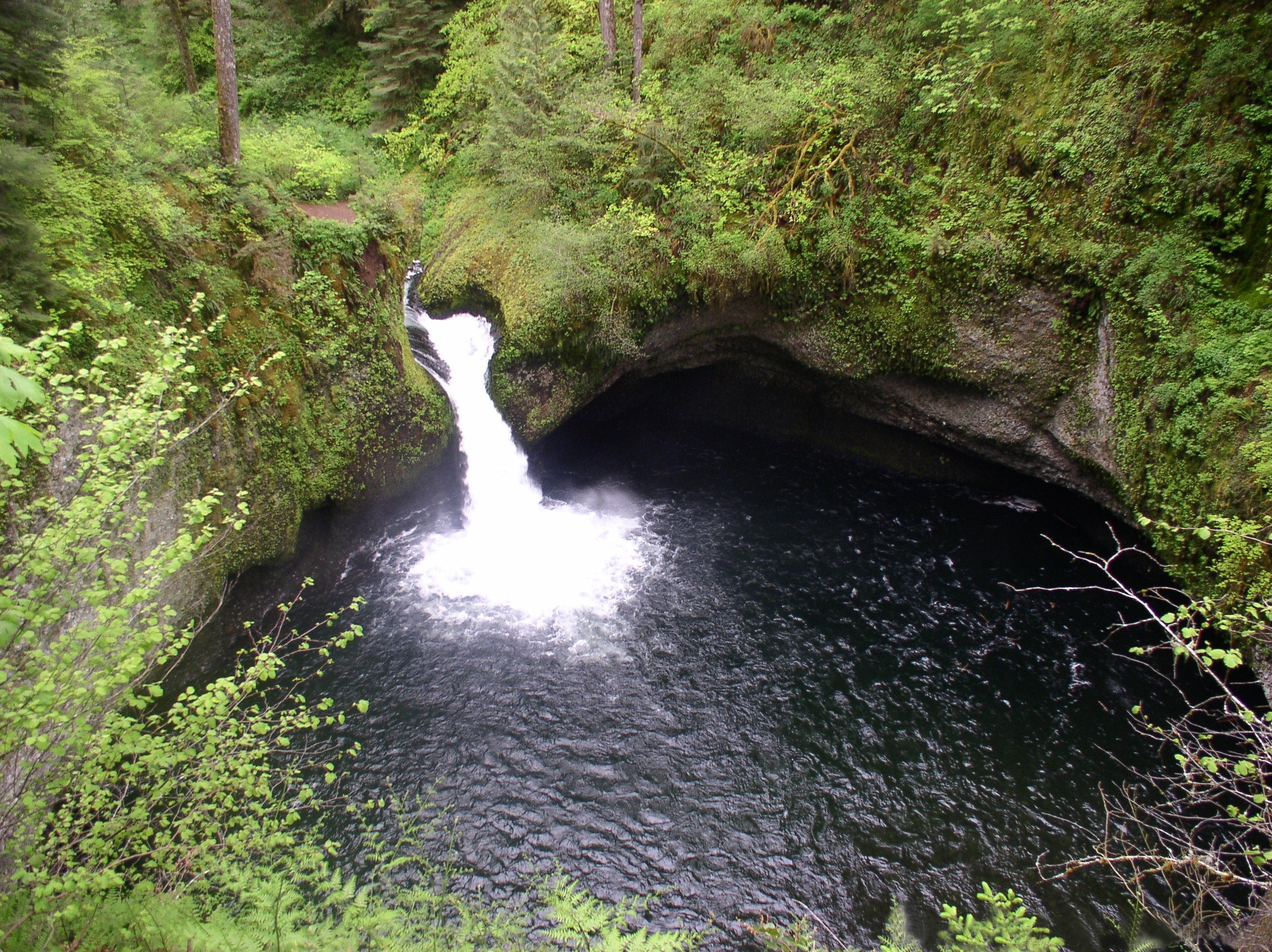
Punch Bowl Falls from the upper viewpoint

Eagle Creek is a tributary of the Columbia River in Multnomah and Hood River counties in the U.S. state of Oregon. It cuts through a narrow canyon in its 3,200 feet (980 m) descent to the Columbia River Gorge and is known for its concentration of 13 waterfalls in about 5 miles (8.0 km) distance. Eight major falls are on Eagle Creek and the East Fork Eagle Creek itself, while five are on its tributaries.

The highest falls of Eagle Creek is Twister Falls, which is a unique cascade of 140 feet (43 m). The highest tributary waterfall is Wauna Falls, which has a total drop of 150 feet (46 m) with the highest of 50 feet (15 m).

The waterfalls are described with most downstream (northerly) first and proceeding upstream along Eagle Creek.

== Eagle Creek and East Fork ==
=== Metlako Falls ===
Metlako Falls, which takes its name from the Indian goddess of salmon, is an 82 feet (25 m) punchbowl waterfall. The falls drop out of a narrow and calm stream pool along Eagle Creek, and shoot powerfully out into the narrow canyon. Metlako Falls has also been measured to be either 100 feet (30 m), 101 feet (31 m), and 150 feet (46 m). Despite its great height, the falls have been run before by experienced kayakers.

Metlako Falls is at coordinates 45.6253°N 121.8968°W.

=== Lower Punch Bowl Falls ===
Lower Punch Bowl Falls is the smaller downstream counterpart of the famous upstream Punch Bowl Falls. It is approximately 12 feet (3.7 m) high and 30 feet (9.1 m) wide. The falls is a popular study for photography, though a stretch of Eagle Creek upstream and Punch Bowl Falls itself are far more popular subjects.

Lower Punch Bowl Falls is at coordinates 45.6230°N 121.8952°W.

=== Punch Bowl Falls ===
Punch Bowl Falls is a 33 feet (10 m) punchbowl, hence the name, just upstream of Lower Punch Bowl Falls, and is an incredibly popular subject of photography. The falls is formed as Eagle Creek is forced into a narrow channel, no more than 5 feet (1.5 m) wide, by sheer cliffs and shoots at high velocity into a natural amphitheater. This waterfall was responsible for the waterfall classification of "punchbowl".

Punch Bowl Falls is at coordinates 45.6219°N 121.8948°W.

=== Skoonichuk Falls ===
Skoonichuk Falls takes its name from the Chinook Indian word meaning evil spirit. About 1.5 miles (2.4 km) upstream of Punch Bowl Falls, Skoonichuk Falls is an often overlooked, 55-foot (17 m) drop on Eagle Creek, with two main tiers of 35 feet (11 m) and 15 feet (4.6 m) with cascades above and below.

Skoonichuk Falls is at coordinates 45.6045°N 121.8801°W.

=== Grand Union Falls ===
Grand Union Falls, also called Grand Junction Falls or Blue Grouse Falls, is an often overlooked waterfall on Eagle Creek just below the famed Tunnel Falls. It is similar in appearance, geology and form to Sevenmile Falls not too far upstream. The falls drop about 45 feet (14 m) in a punchbowl form, ending in a large, clear pool below. The cliff it flows over consists of the same columnar basalt that is very common in the Columbia River Gorge area.

Grand Union Falls is at coordinates 45.5843°N 121.8540°W.

=== Tunnel Falls ===
Tunnel Falls is the only known waterfall on the East Fork Eagle Creek, with a sheer plunge of 130 feet (40 m) into a narrow bowl. Its most famous feature is the way the Eagle Creek Trail passes behind it, through a narrow tunnel blasted in the cliff face, 60 feet (18 m) above the streambed. The falls takes its name from this tunnel. The waterfall is actually on the East Fork Eagle Creek, not on Eagle Creek itself, but the East Fork is a substantial stream and Tunnel Falls is often associated with Eagle Creek anyway.

Tunnel Falls is at coordinates 45.5850°N 121.8522°W.

=== Twister Falls ===
Twister Falls is a unique series of cascades on Eagle Creek, totaling about 140 feet (43 m) in height. It begins with a small plunge, then some cascades over bulbous rocks. Then the waters converge and are funneled through two narrow channels over a sheer cliff about 50 feet (15 m) high, forming two streams of water that cross over each other- hence the name "Twister". It ends with a plunge of 80 feet (24 m) into a large basin below the falls. Crisscross Falls, Crossover Falls, Bowtie Falls, and Eagle Creek Falls are all accepted alternate names for this waterfall.

Twister Falls is at coordinates 45.5822°N 121.8522°W.

=== Sevenmile Falls ===
Sevenmile Falls is the uppermost known major waterfall along Eagle Creek, and is very similar in form and appearance to Grand Union Falls above. The falls drop 40 feet (12 m) over columnar basalt, ending in a modest pool. The falls were named for being near the 7 miles (11 km) mark (river mile 7) of Eagle Creek, but is also known as Upper Eagle Creek Falls.

Sevenmile Falls is at coordinates 45.5800°N 121.8516°W.

== Tributary waterfalls ==
=== Wauna Falls ===
Wauna Falls is a relatively hidden waterfall on a small, unnamed tributary of Eagle Creek well downstream from the first major waterfall, Metlako Falls. The falls, obscured by foliage, cascades in 5 tiers down the canyon wall for 150 feet (46 m), with a tallest drop of 50 feet (15 m).

Wauna Falls is at coordinates 45.6297°N 121.9076°W.

=== Sorenson Falls ===
Sorenson Falls is a waterfall near Metlako Falls, dropping about 100 feet (30 m) into the canyon nearly parallel with it. The falls are mostly obstructed by foliage and cannot be seen clearly from the Eagle Creek trail.

Sorenson Falls is at coordinates 45.6255°N 121.8963°W.

=== Loowit Falls ===
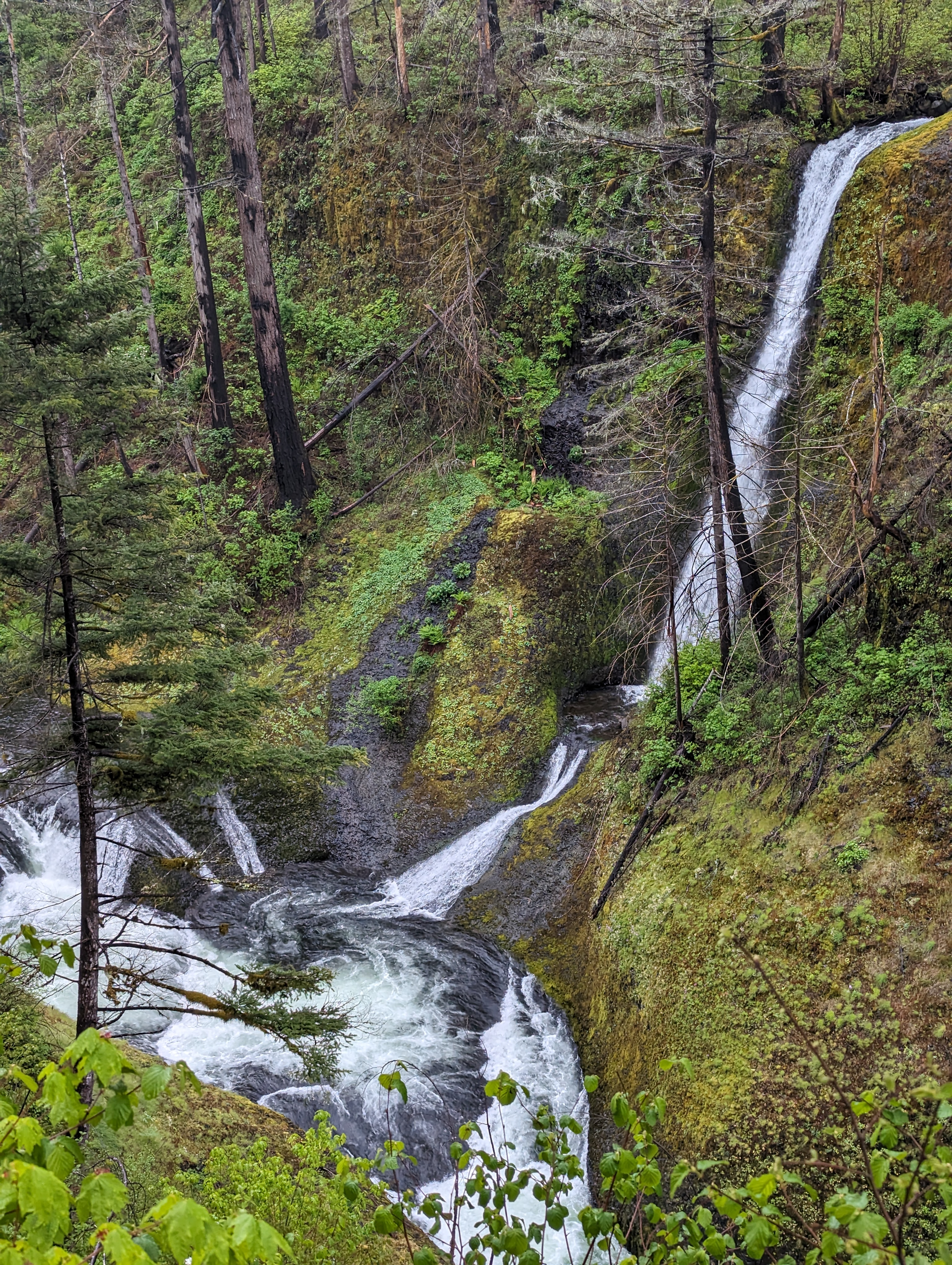
Loowit Falls, April 28, 2024

Loowit Falls is located shortly downstream of Skoonichuk Falls, and drops about 60 feet (18 m). The falls has one main tier that drops into a nearly perfectly round pool, before cascading into Eagle Creek. Loowit Falls takes its name from Loowit, an old woman in local Indian tribe lore who tended an eternal fire burning on the Bridge of the Gods, and who transformed into Mount St. Helens upon her death.

Loowit Falls is at coordinates 45.6087°N 121.8845°W.

=== Tenas Falls ===
Tenas Falls is a rather non-notable waterfall on an unnamed stream that joins Eagle Creek just above Skoonichuk Falls. It skips about 25 feet (7.6 m) down a small ledge in two tiers. Tenas Falls takes its name from a Chinookan word meaning "small".

Tenas Falls is at coordinates 45.5993°N 121.8779°W.

=== Wy'east Falls ===
Wy'east Falls is a 140 feet (43 m) plunge along a small tributary of Eagle Creek. Like so many of the other waterfalls along Eagle Creek, it plunges over the Columbia River Gorge basalt formation. The falls takes its name from Wy'east, the Native American name for Mount Hood.

Wy'east Falls is at coordinates 45.5927°N 121.8644°W.

== Access ==
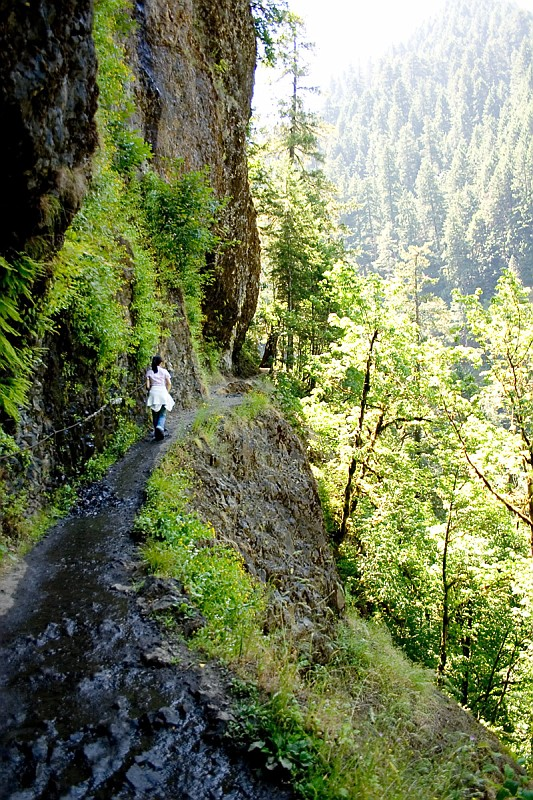
The Eagle Creek Trail

All the waterfalls along Eagle Creek are accessed along the Eagle Creek Trail, which is a creatively constructed trail that leads from the Historic Columbia River Highway upstream along Eagle Creek, passing by several campsites. The trail leads 1.5 miles (2.4 km) to Punch Bowl Falls and continues a further 7.5 miles (12.1 km) to Tunnel Falls.
