= Wahtum Lake =

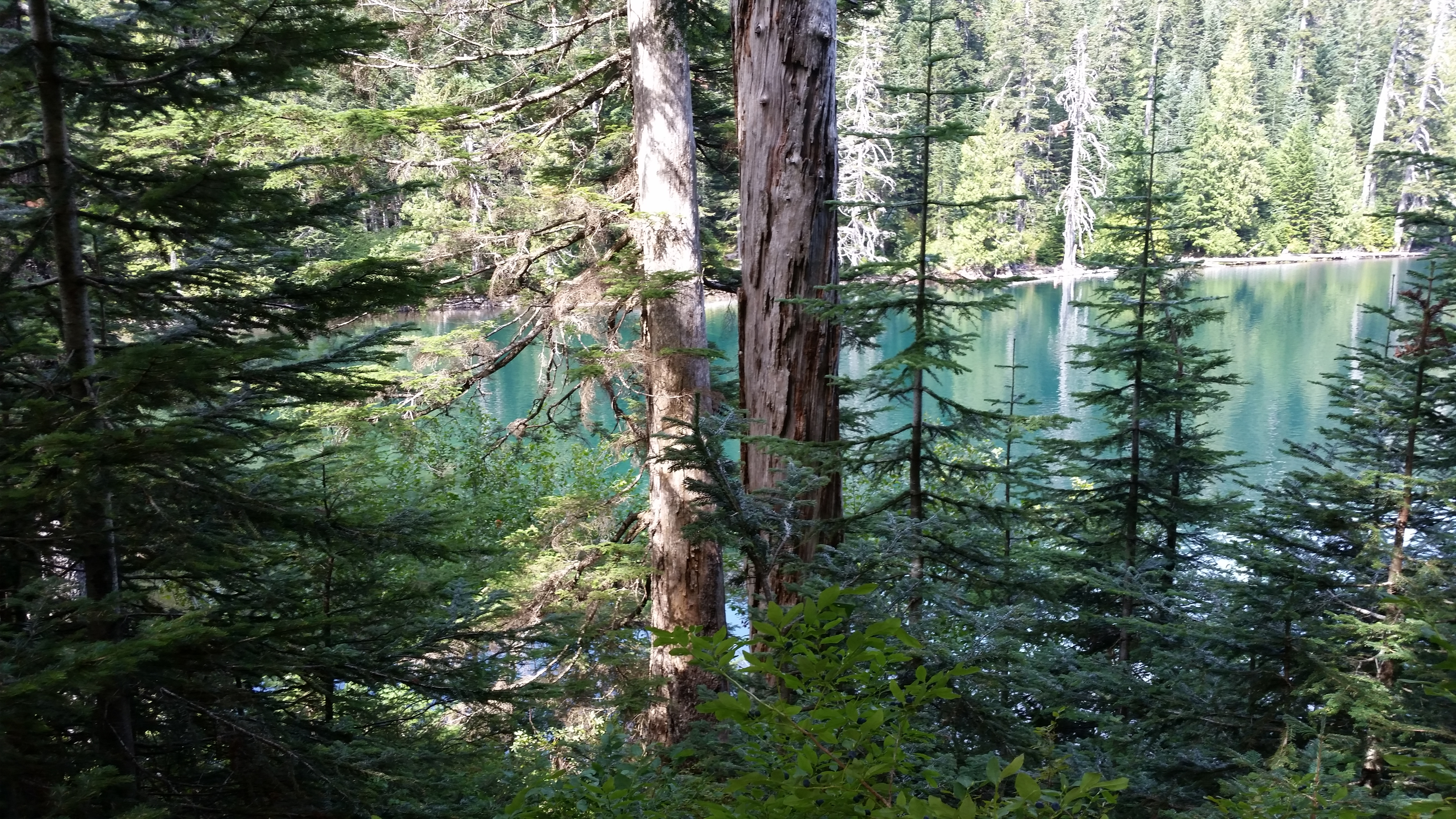

- Location of Wahtum Lake in Oregon
- Location: Hood River County, Oregon
- Coordinates: 45°34′55″N 121°47′40″W
- Type: Cirque lake
- Primary outflows: East Fork Eagle Creek
- Basin countries: United States
- Managing agency: Mount Hood National Forest
- Max. depth: 184 feet (56 m)
- Surface elevation: 3,727 feet (1,136 m)

Wahtum Lake is a lake in Hood River County, Oregon, United States, in the Mark O. Hatfield Wilderness of the Mount Hood National Forest. "Wahtum" comes from the Sahaptin language, and means "pond' or "body of water.". The largest lake within the boundaries of the Columbia River Gorge, it is the source of the East Fork of Eagle Creek, and at 184 feet (56 m) is the deepest lake in the Mount Hood National Forest. At an elevation of 3,727 feet (1,136 m), the lake is located in a cirque formed by glacial erosion.

Less than 0.25 miles from a trailhead reachable by paved road, Wahtum Lake is a popular recreation destination. Several campsites exist at the trailhead and there are backcountry sites on the shore of the lake itself. A dense network of trails exists around the lake, with several leading 4,000 feet (1,200 m) down to the Columbia River. The Pacific Crest Trail wraps around Wahtum Lake, while the Eagle Creek Trail #440 — the most popular trail in the Gorge — has its upper terminus at Wahtum Lake.
