= LoRell's Chicken Shack =

Restaurant in Portland, Oregon, U.S.

- LoRell's Chicken Shop at the Lloyd Center's food court, 2025
- Interactive map of LoRell's Chicken Shack

Restaurant information
- Established: 2021
- Owner: Darell Preston
- Location: Portland, Multnomah, Oregon, United States
- Coordinates: 45.54085°N 122.6731°W

LoRell's Chicken Shack is a restaurant in Portland, Oregon, United States. Darell Preston is the owner.

== Description ==
The restaurant LoRell's Chicken Shack operates in Portland, Oregon. The menu includes fried chicken (tenders or wings) and French fries.

== History ==
Established in 2021, the Black-owned restaurant LoRell's Chicken Shack began as a food cart and later operated at the Lloyd Center's food court. The food cart operated at Carts on Foster, a pod in Southeast Portland's Foster-Powell neighborhood, as well as the Rose City Food Park pod in Northeast Portland's Rose City Park neighborhood. LoRell's began operating at the Lloyd Center in 2024.

In June 2023, a man shouted racial slurs and attacked Preston when the food cart operated at Carts on Foster. In response, the community raised funds for the business. A video of the attack went viral. The man was sentenced to prison in 2024.

Following the shopping mall's closure in 2026, LoRell's relocated to a Russell Street building in North Portland owned by the organization 1803 Fund. LoRell's participated in Fried Chicken Week in 2026.

== Reception ==
Michael Russell and Lizzy Acker ranked LoRell's ninth in The Oregonian's list of "Portland's best new food carts of 2022". Andy Beth Miller selected the business for Oregon in The Takeout's 2025 overview of the best fried chicken restaurants in each U.S. state, describing LoRell's as "hometown favorite that started as a humble wing cart". Alex Frane and Jordan Michelman included LoRell's in Portland Monthly's 2026 overview of the city's best chicken wings. Michelman said the wings "should be consumed immediately ... to maximize the marvelous dichotomy between the crispy-crunchy crust, zippy-zingy sauce, and flavor-blasting powder" and opined, "The fries are also excellent, hand-cut and irregular in the best way, ideal for soaking up a bit of that sauce. If you love breaded, fried wings, these are the city’s best, full stop."

== See also ==
- Fried chicken restaurant
- List of Black-owned restaurants
- List of chicken restaurants
