= PDX671 =

Defunct restaurant in Portland, Oregon, U.S.

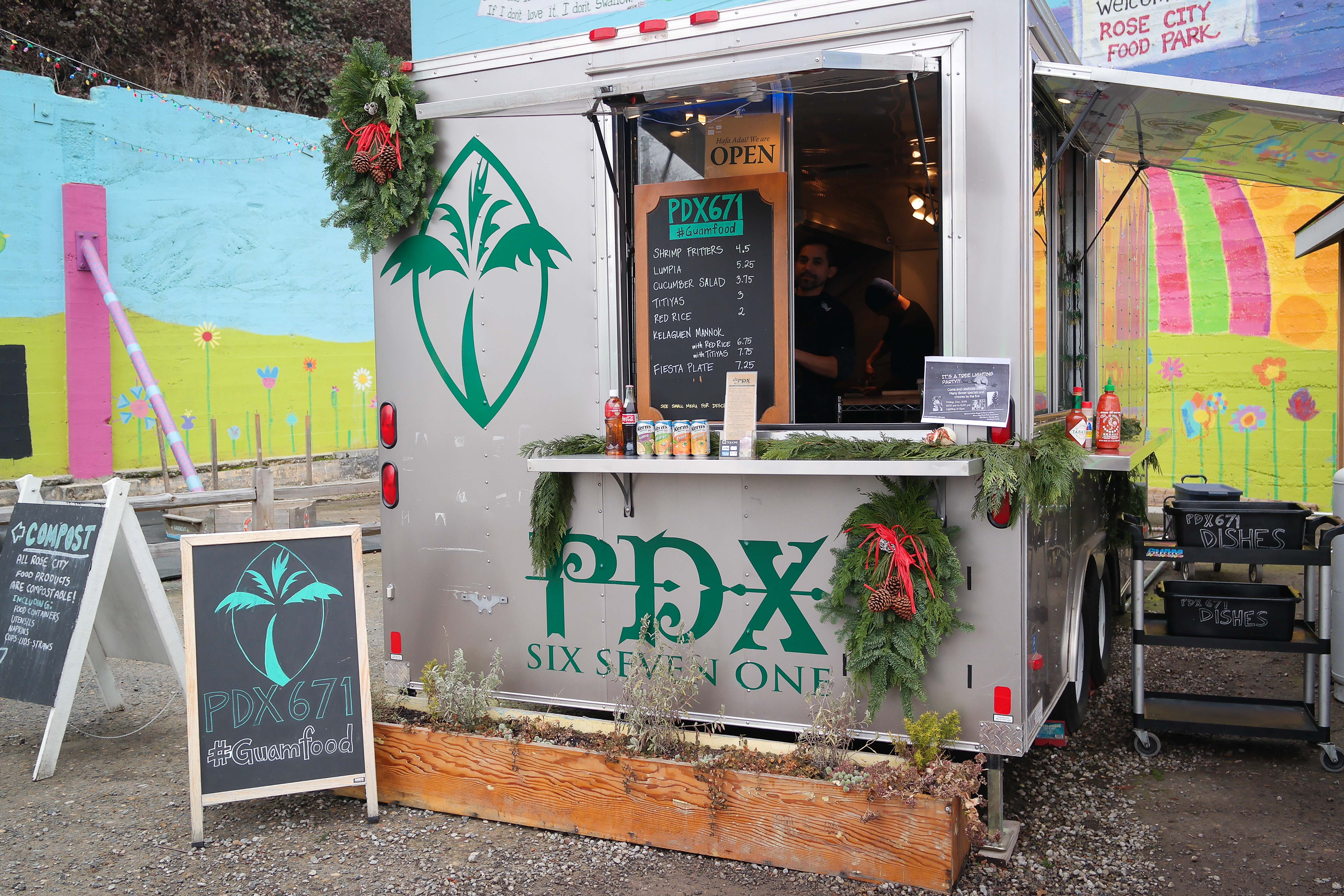
- The food cart in December 2013

Restaurant information
- Established: 2010
- Closed: c. 2018
- Owner: Ed Sablan
- Chef: Ed Sablan
- Food type: Guamanian
- Location: Portland, Multnomah, Oregon, United States

PDX671, or PDX Six Seven One, was a food cart that served Guamanian cuisine in Portland, Oregon. Ed Sablan operated the business from 2010 to c. 2018 when he closed PDX671 and opened Biba CHamoru Kitchen, the city's first and only brick-and-mortar Guamanian restaurant in 2019.

PDX671 had garnered a positive reception, especially for its Kelaguen Mannok and titiya (Guamanian flatbread), and was included in The Oregonian's 2011 overview of Portland's best new food carts. Guy Fieri visited the cart for an episode of the Food Network series Diners, Drive-Ins and Dives.

== Description ==
PDX671 was a food cart that served Guamanian cuisine in Portland, Oregon. The business was named after the IATA airport code for Portland International Airport ("PDX") and area code 671 in Guam. It operated from the Rose City Food Park at the intersection of Sandy Boulevard and 52nd Avenue in northeast Portland's Rose City Park neighborhood. According to Portland Monthly, the food "re-created the flavors" of the owner's childhood using ingredients from the Pacific Northwest, which were sourced from farms in Oregon.

=== Menu ===
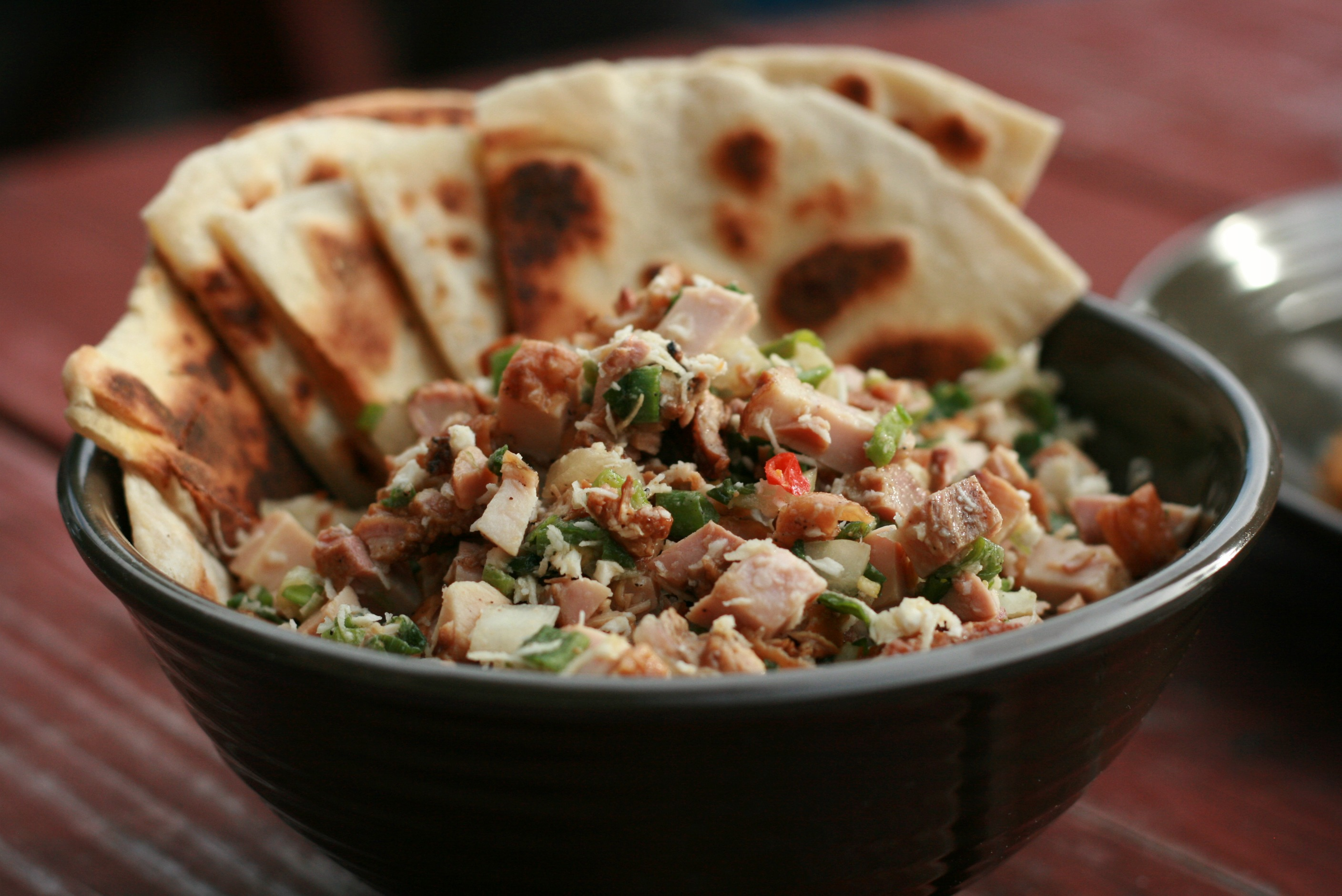
The Kelaguen Mannok with titiyas

The menu specialized in traditional dishes (or chamorro) from the Mariana Islands. According to Eater Portland, the food combined several cuisines within the city, including Filipino, Chinese, Japanese, Spanish, Mexican, and American. The Kelaguen Mannok was a cold chicken salad with grated coconut, red chili, and scallions, served with titiya (Guamanian flatbread). The flatbread's dough had coconut milk and butter. The fried lumpia used ground pork from the now-defunct restaurant Tails & Trotters, and the marinated short ribs were served over red rice, or rice dyed from annatto seed.

PDX671 also served bonelos uhang, or fritters with pink shrimp and vegetables, as well as estufao (pork shoulder and rice) and linechen gollai (spinach in coconut milk). The Fiesta Plate was a combo platter described by Eater Portland as PDX671's "most thorough introduction" to Guamanian cuisine, and included lumpia, a grilled chicken thigh, fritters, rice, and dipping sauces. The Nengkanno' Gupot was grilled chicken with rice and a dressing called Fina'dene' made with soy, chili, and citrus.

== History ==
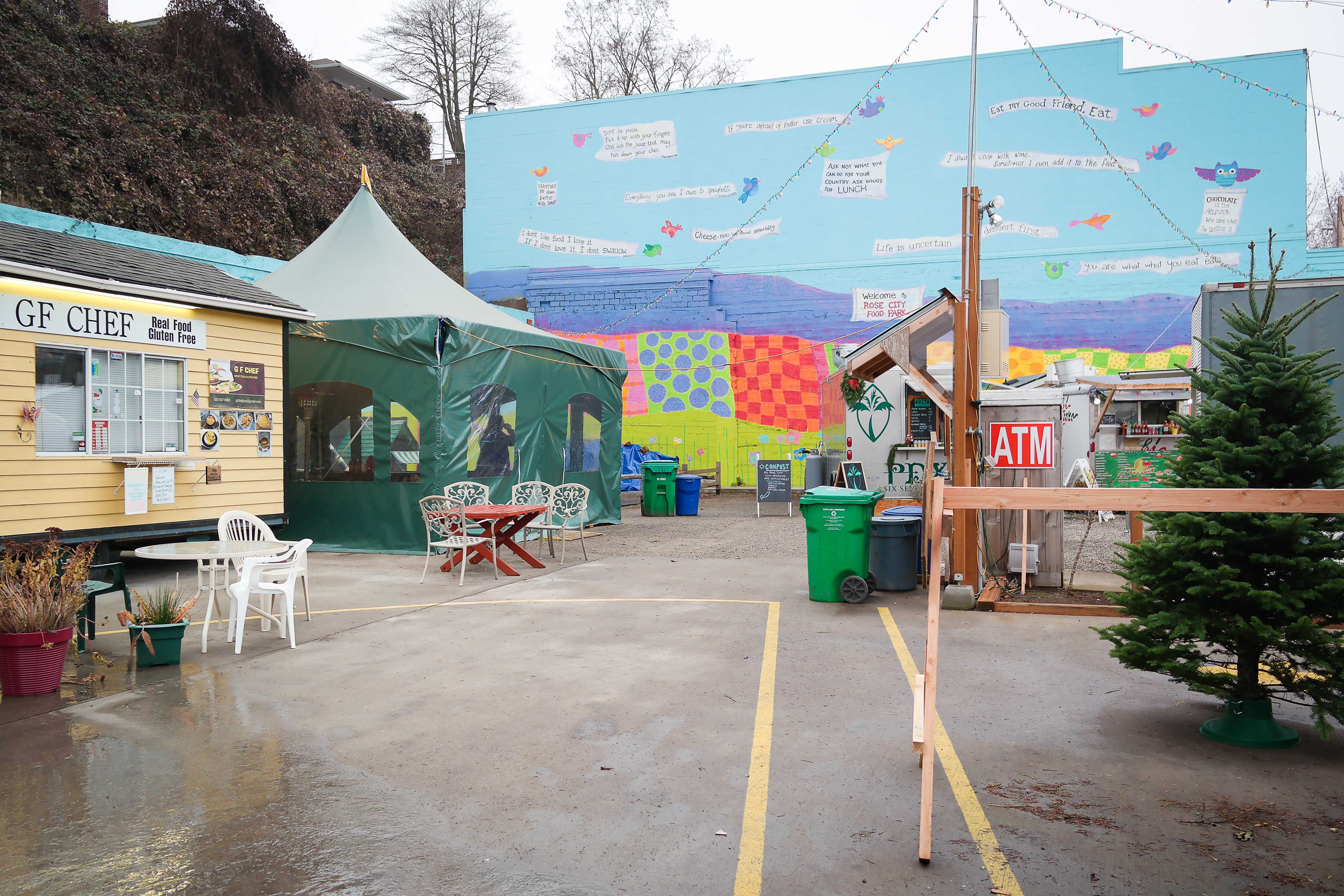
PDX671 among other food carts at Rose City Food Park, 2013

Ed Sablan opened the food cart in 2010 after attending the Western Culinary Institute in Portland. In 2012, the cart was operating at the D Street Noshery at the intersection of 32nd and Division, in southeast Portland's Richmond neighborhood.

By the time the D Street Noshery closed in October 2012, PDX671 had relocated to the Rose City Food Park, which held a grand opening on October 20. The cart's main electrical cord was stolen shortly after relocating. Sablan operated the business until c. 2018, when he opened Biba CHamoru Kitchen, the city's first and only brick-and-mortar Guamanian restaurant, in 2019, and continued hosting pop-ups after PDX671 closed.

In 2014, PDX671 hosted a pop-up dinner as part of Little T American Baker's 'After Hours Supper Club' series. The six-course dinner featured comfort food dishes from Guam. Sablan hosted a Food of Guam five-course, prix fixe pop-up dinner at the restaurant Feastly in 2018, "[celebrating] indigenous Chamorro cuisine and the culinary influences from Asia, Europe, and Mexico". The pop-up inspired the chef–owner of the Island Girl's Lunchbox food truck to launch a similar concept in Salem.

Guy Fieri tried the Kelaguen Mannok on an episode of the Food Network's Diners, Drive-Ins and Dives.

== Reception ==
Michael Russell included the business in The Oregonian's 2011 overview of Portland's best new food carts. The newspaper has also included PDX671 in a list of the city's top 50 food carts. Heather Shouse, the author of Food Trucks: Dispatches and Recipes from the Best Kitchens on Wheels (2011), said the titiyas "make for a nice breakfast snack" and the fritters "are delicious anytime". Bill Addison of Eater said the dipping sauces "give the monochromatic (but vividly flavored) dishes some acidic pop". Fieri described the Kelaguen Mannok as "simple, basic and dynamite" on Diners, Drive-Ins and Dives.

PDX671 earned the judges' taste award at Willamette Week's annual Eat Mobile food cart festival in 2012. Michael C. Zusman said "a lot of [the] weird dishes ... are as compelling as they are offbeat" and called the Kelaguen Mannok the restaurant's "superstar" in 2016. He said the flatbread had "magnificent, char-spotted disks that are simultaneously soft, chewy and ethereally fragrant". In 2017, other writers for the newspaper said the coconut flatbread was "insanely good". In Willamette Week's 2018 "cheap eats" guide, Matthew Korfhage said PDX671 serves the "most delicious food in Portland" and called the Kelaguen Mannok with flatbread "one of the most ecstatic meals" in the city for $10.

== See also ==
- Culture of Guam
- Food carts in Portland, Oregon
- List of Diners, Drive-Ins and Dives episodes
