= Baby Blue Pizza =

Defunct pizzeria in Portland, Oregon, U.S.

Restaurant information
- Established: July 2019
- Closed: January 2022
- Owner: Odie O'Connor
- Food type: Italian (pizza)
- Location: Portland, Multnomah, Oregon, United States
- Website: babybluepizza.com

Baby Blue Pizza (sometimes Baby Blue Woodfired Pizza) was a vegan pizzeria in Portland, Oregon, United States. The restaurant operated from July 2019 to January 2022, closing during the COVID-19 pandemic.

== Description ==
The vegan pizzeria Baby Blue Pizza operated in Portland, Oregon. It was frequented by students at Central Catholic High School and neighbors along Southeast Stark Street. Eater Portland said pizzas and sandwiches were served by "enthusiastic twenty-somethings in overalls and tie dye".

The restaurant served seven vegan pizzas with sourdough crusts and toppings like meatless pepperoni, olives, ricotta, and San Marzano tomato sauce. The Gringo Starr had kale, vegan versions of mozzarella, pepperoni, and pork belly, as well as red onions. The Krusty Burger was described as a hamburger pie with pickled cucumber and a "secret sauce". Other varieties included a Margherita and another called the Truffle Shuffle. Sometimes gluten-free crusts were used.

== History ==
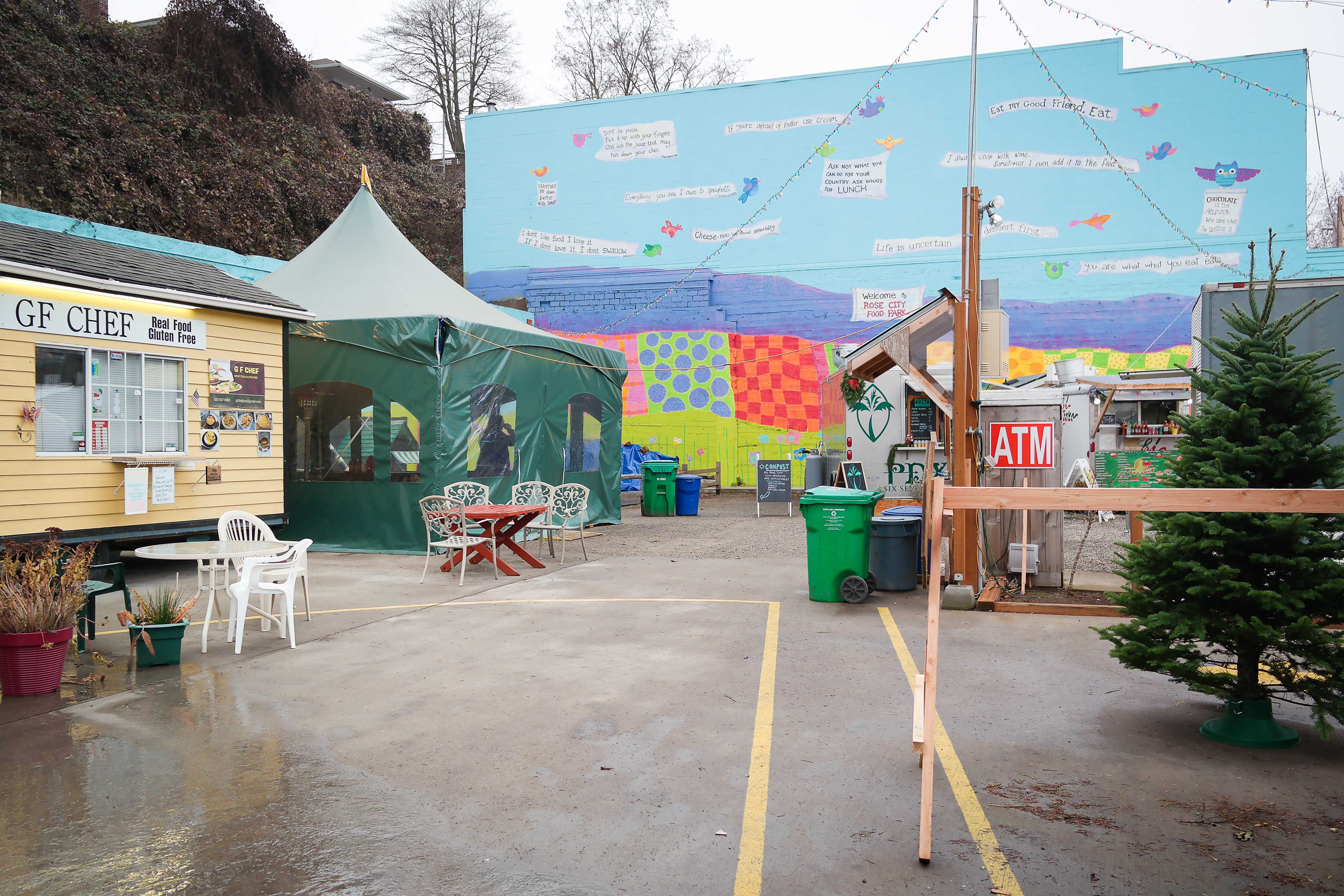
The food cart operated at the Rose City Food Park (pictured in 2013).

Vegan chef Odie O'Connor, who previously worked at Gracie's Apizza, began operating Baby Blue as a food cart on Hawthorne Boulevard in southeast Portland in July 2019. Approximately two years later, O'Connor relocated the business to the Rose City Food Park. He closed the cart for approximately one month during the COVID-19 pandemic, allowing him to explore making other types of pizza and open a separate small pizzeria called Boxcar Pizza. Katherine Chew Hamilton of Portland Monthly described Boxcar as a "sister pizzeria" to Baby Blue.

Like many restaurants during the pandemic, Baby Blue operated via take-out or bike courier delivery at times. The restaurant closed in January 2022; employees were given the option to work at Boxcar Pizza.

== Reception ==
In 2019, Chelsea Debret of One Green Planet said Baby Blue is "pioneered by a popular vegan chef who has mastered both the cart and the pop-up", describing O'Connor as "dynamic". Willamette Week recommended the pizzeria for "pizzas with housemade faux meat and temporary non-pizza items announced on Instagram". The business was added to the Vegetarian Resource Group's Guide to Vegan/Vegetarian Restaurants in the USA and Canada in 2019.

Michael Russell included Baby Blue in The Oregon's 2020 overview of Portland's five best new pizzerias. He said Baby Blue "stands out for the quality of its chewy, blistered dough" and was "leaning the charge" amongst the city's new vegan pizzerias. The Portland Business Journal gave the business a rating of 5 stars. Waz Wu included Baby Blue in Eater Portland's 2021 overview of "where to find knockout vegan pizza" in the city and said, "This successful pop-up-turned-food-cart slings some of the most exciting vegan pizza in town." Wu also included the business in a 2021 list of thirteen "vegan food carts to visit" in the Portland metropolitan area. Baby Blue was a nominee in the Best Vegan Pizzeria category of VegNews magazine's annual Veggie Awards in 2022.

== See also ==
- COVID-19 pandemic in Portland, Oregon
- Impact of the COVID-19 pandemic on the restaurant industry in the United States
- List of defunct restaurants of the United States
- List of vegetarian and vegan restaurants
- Pizza in Portland, Oregon
