= Carts on Foster =

Food pod in Portland, Oregon, U.S.

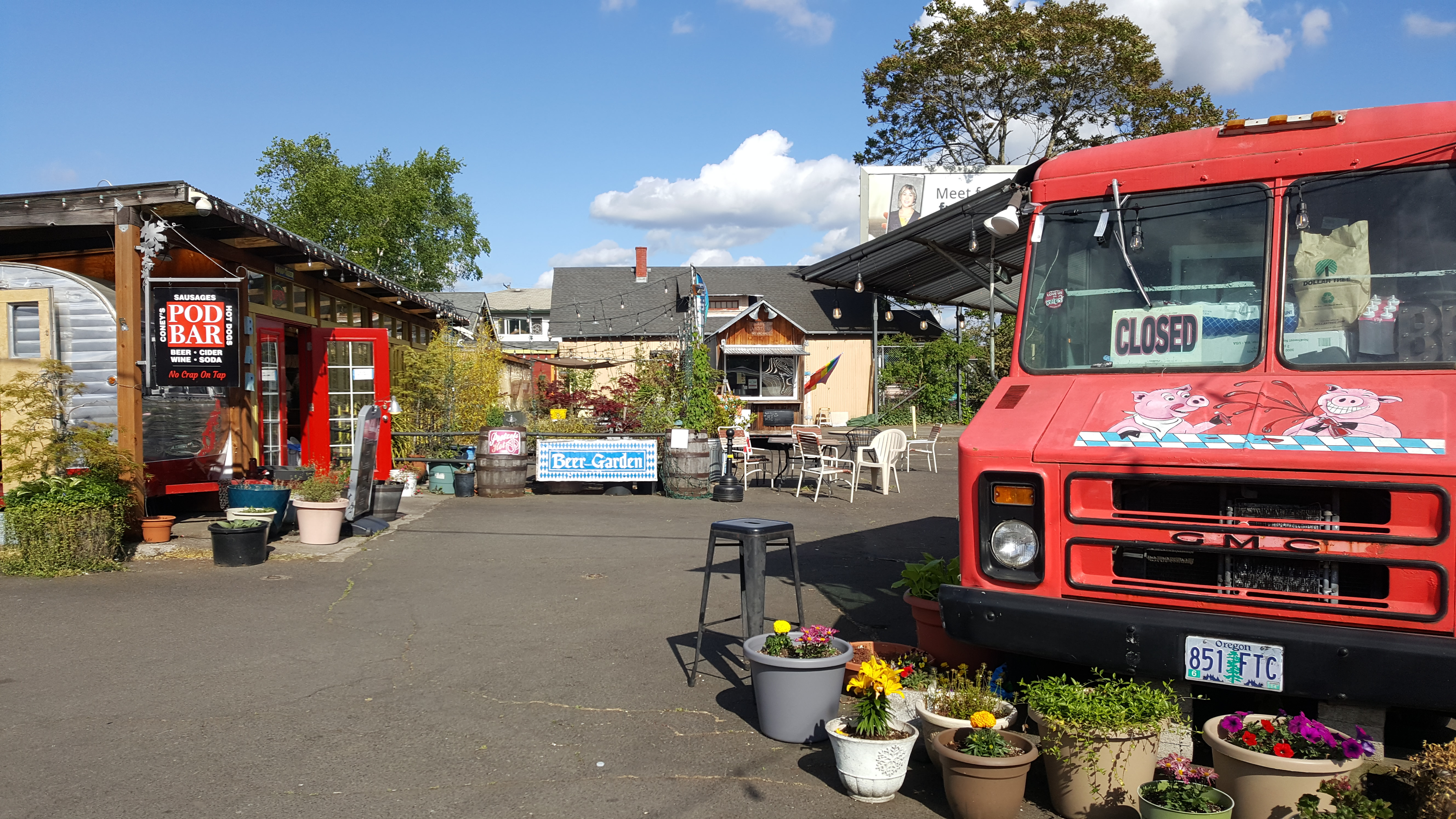
- Part of the pod in 2021

- Location within Oregon
- Coordinates: 45°29′45″N 122°36′31″W

Carts on Foster was a collection of food carts, or "pod", in Portland, Oregon's Foster-Powell neighborhood, in the United States. Established in 2010, Carts on Foster was owned and managed by Steve Woolard. Ownership was transferred to 2021, and the pod closed in 2023.

== History ==
Carts on Foster in 2013

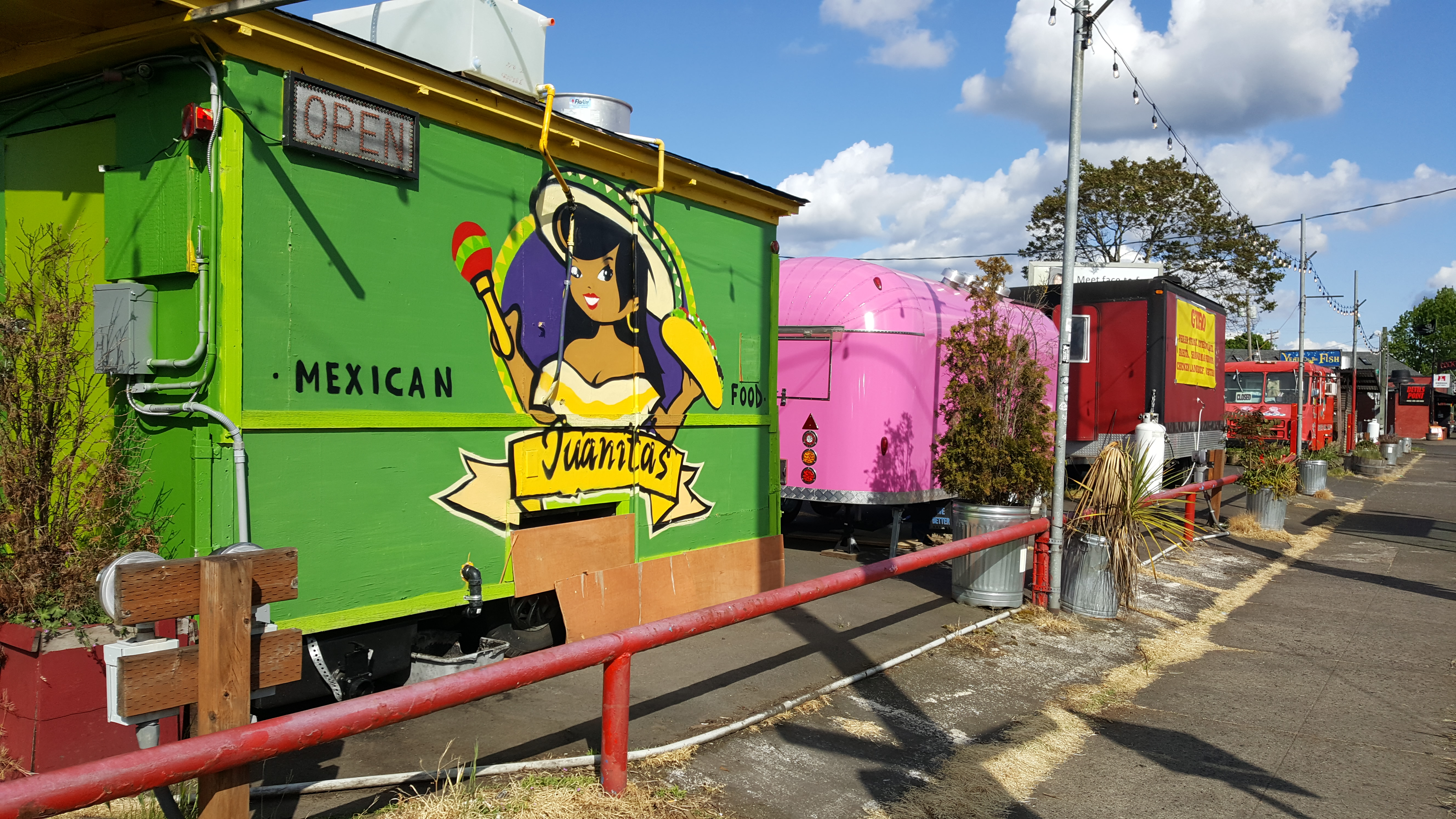
Food carts

Original owner Steve Woolard opened Carts on Foster in 2010. The pod was the city's first to serve beer. Woolard sold the business in 2021, to the owner of another pod in Woodstock.

In 2014, Carts on Foster was the starting point for Santacon PDX, a pub crawl in which attendees dress as Santa Claus. In 2016, approximately ten carts in the pod were vandalized. Carts on Foster was included in Willamette Week's 2018 list of "Our Favorite Beer Carts". The pod was shut down in 2023.

The following businesses operated in the pod:

- Bari
- CoKiea's Kitchen
- Egg Carton
- El Local
- Fresh n' Funky
- Java Rising
- Juanita's Mexican Food
- Lady Latke
- LoRell's Chicken Shack
- Marty's Sandwich Depot
- Mauna Kea
- Mojo's Rainbow Hawaiian
- Monster Mac
- Mumbo Gumbo
- PieCake
- Pod Bar
- Pop'z Place
- Road Runner Mesquite BBQ
- Rose City Waffles
- Salon Bucci
- Shawarma Station
- Toune's Yakisoba Food Cart
- Year of the Fish

In 2025, the food cart pod Foster Food Carts began operating at the site under different ownership.

== See also ==
- Food carts in Portland, Oregon
