= Kern Park =

Public park in Portland, Oregon, U.S.

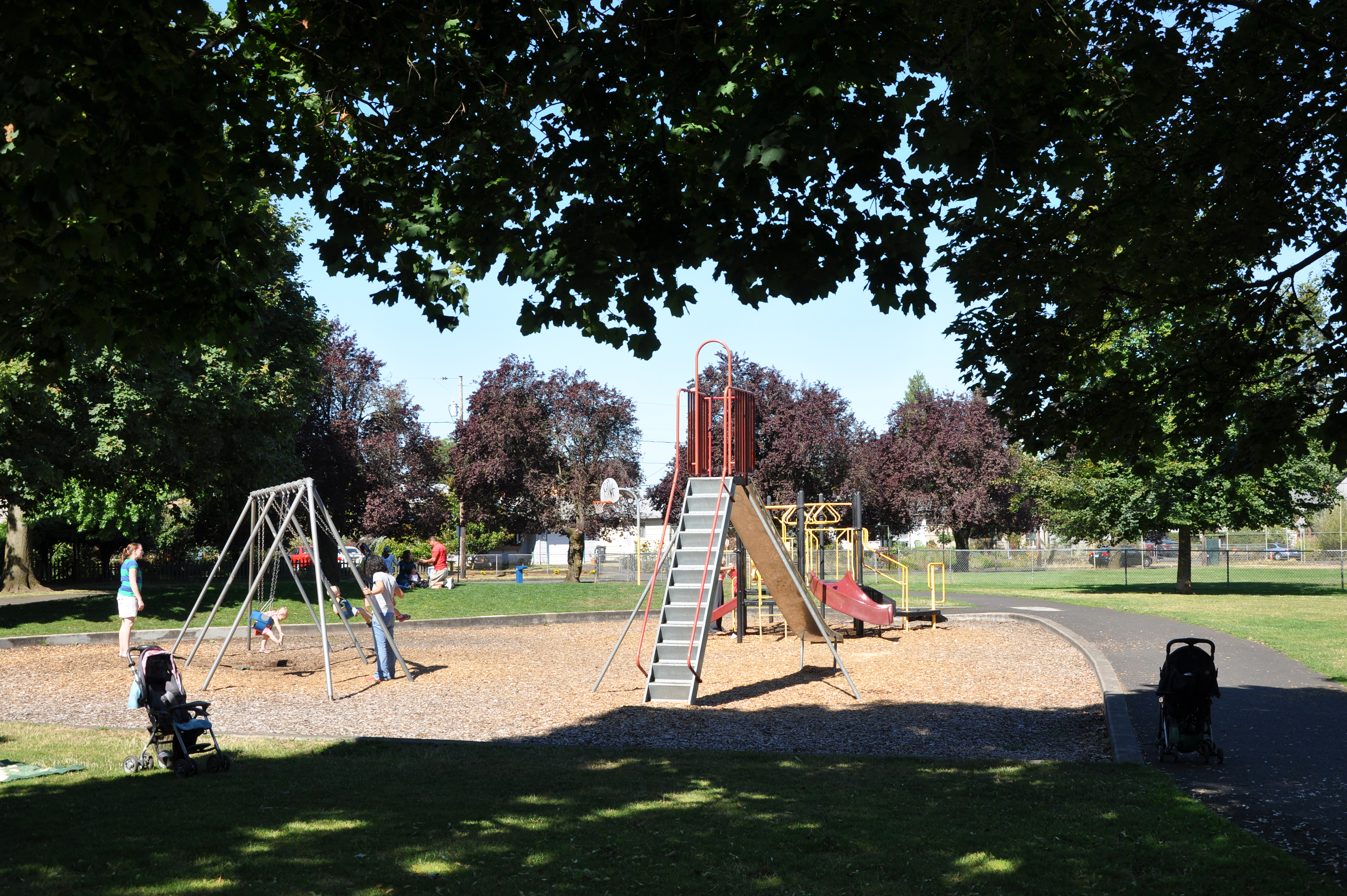
- Playground at the park, 2010

- Location within Portland, Oregon
- Location: SE 67th Ave. and Center St. Portland, Oregon
- Coordinates: 45°29′36″N 122°35′41″W
- Area: 1.62 acres (0.66 ha)
- Operator: Portland Parks & Recreation

Kern Park is a 1.62-acre (0.66 ha) public park in Portland, Oregon's Foster-Powell neighborhood, in the United States.

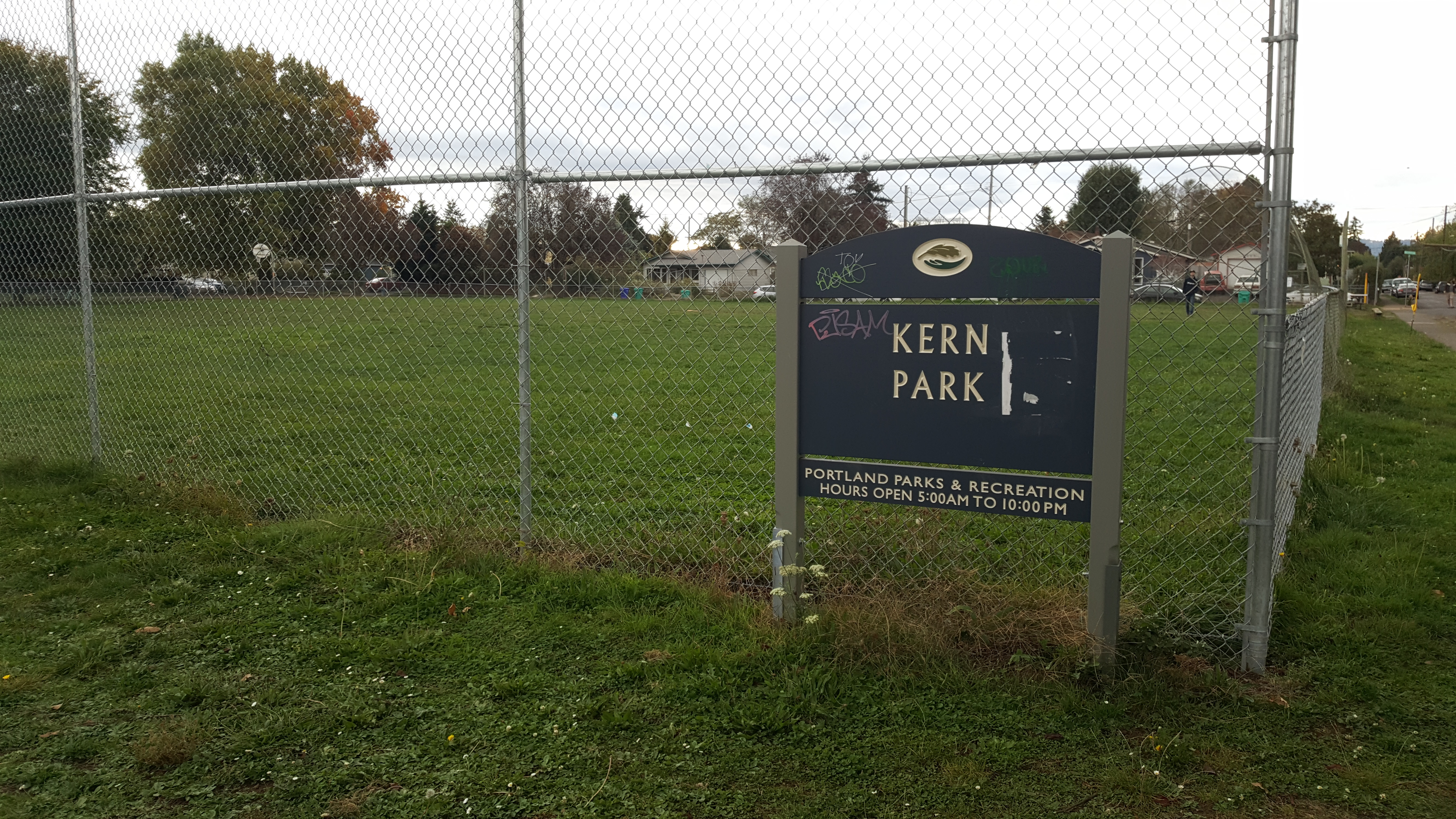
Sign for the park, 2020
