= Pastificio d'Oro =

Italian restaurant in Portland, Oregon, U.S.

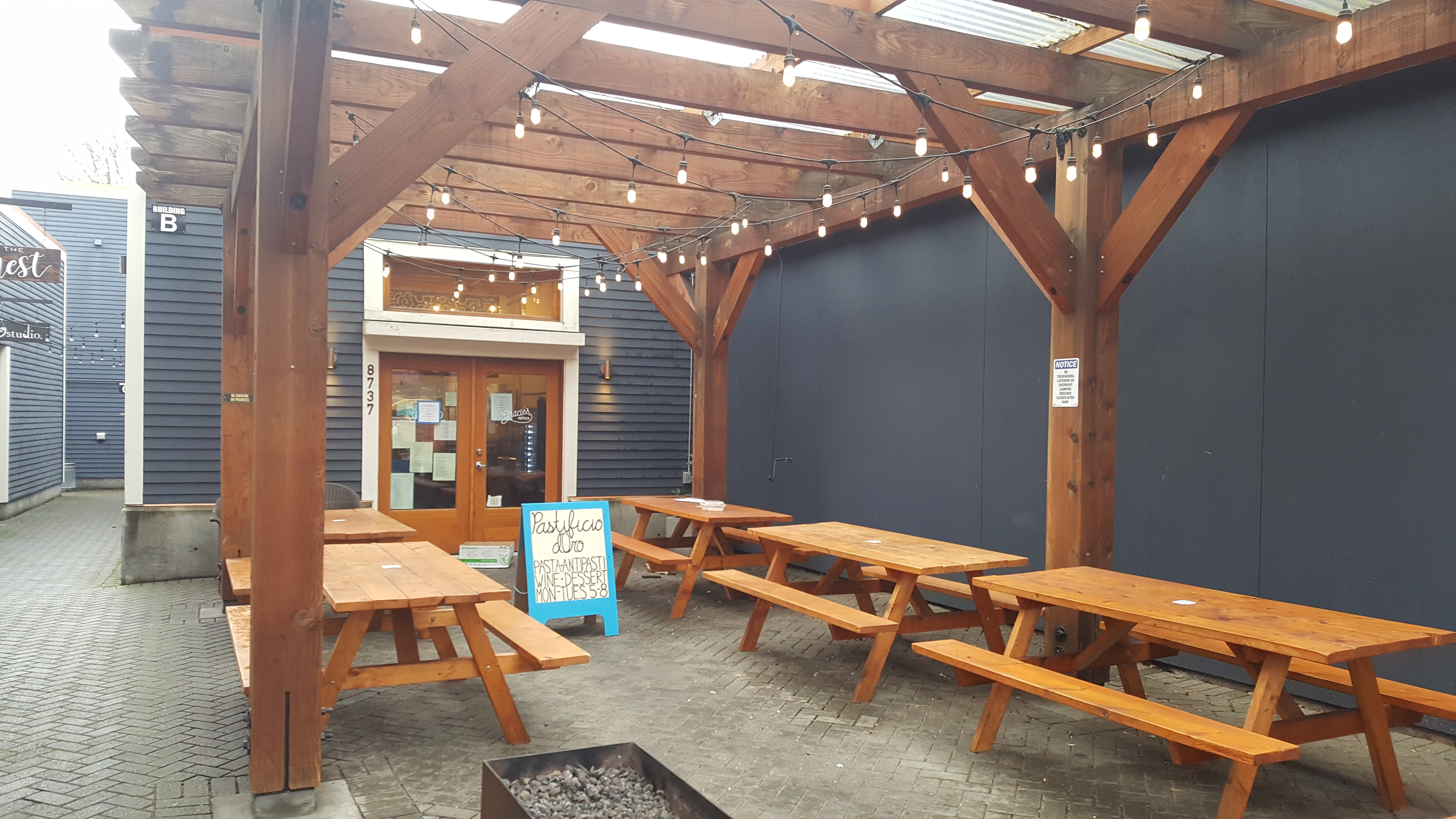
- Sign for Pastificio d'Oro at the former location of Gracie's Apizza
- Interactive map of Pastificio d'Oro

Restaurant information
- Owners: Chase Dopson; Maggie Irwin
- Chef: Chase Dopson
- Food type: Italian
- Location: 8737 North Lombard Street, Portland, Multnomah, Oregon, 97203, United States
- Coordinates: 45.5910°N 122.7556°W
- Website: doropdx.com

Pastificio d'Oro was an Italian restaurant in Portland, Oregon's St. Johns neighborhood, in the United States. Chase Dopson and Maggie Irwin started the business as a pop-up restaurant, initially operating from Gracie's Apizza before moving into the brick and mortar space in 2022. Pastificio d'Oro served traditional cuisine and garnered a positive reception. It closed permanently in 2025.

== Description ==
The Italian restaurant Pastificio d'Oro operated in St. Johns, Portland. It had a wood-fired oven. The menu featured rotating homemade pasta dishes, such as tagliatelle ragù. The restaurant also served lasagna and ricotta tortelloni.

== History ==
Chase Dopson was a co-owner and chef, and Maggie Irwin was also a co-owner. The business opened in late 2022, in the space that previously occupied Gracie's Apizza. It closed permanently in 2025.

== Reception ==
Michael Russell ranked Pastificio d'Oro tenth in The Oregonian's list of Portland's best new restaurants of 2022. Pastificio d'Oro ranked second in the best pasta restaurants category of The Oregonian's annual readers choice awards in 2024. Brooke Jackson-Glidden included the business in Eater Portland's 2023 overview of "vital" restaurants and food carts in St. Johns. The website also included Pastificio d'Oro in a 2024 list of the city's "stellar" Italian eateries and a 2025 list of Portland's best Italian restaurants.

== See also ==
- List of defunct restaurants of the United States
- List of Italian restaurants
