= Rose City Food Park =

Food cart pod in Portland, Oregon, U.S.

- Logo
- Address: 5235 Northeast Sandy Boulevard; Portland, Oregon
- Interactive map of Rose City Food Park
- Coordinates: 45°32′26″N 122°36′34″W
- Website: rosecityfoodpark.com

Rose City Food Park (RCFP) is a food cart pod in Portland, Oregon, United States.

== Description ==
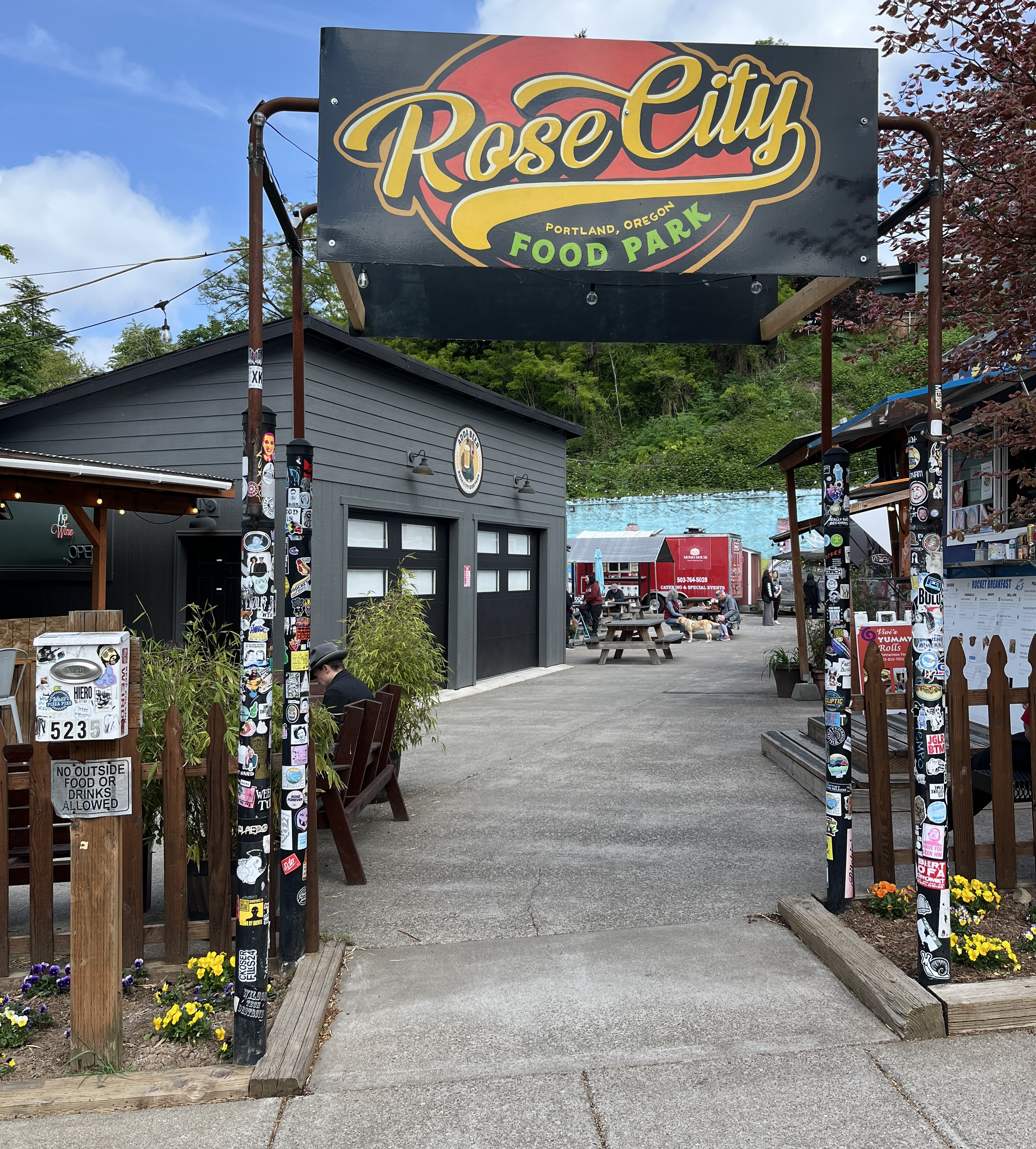
Entrance to the food cart pod, 2025

Rose City Food Park (RCFP) is a food cart pod on Sandy Boulevard at 52nd Avenue in northeast Portland's Rose City Park neighborhood.

== History ==
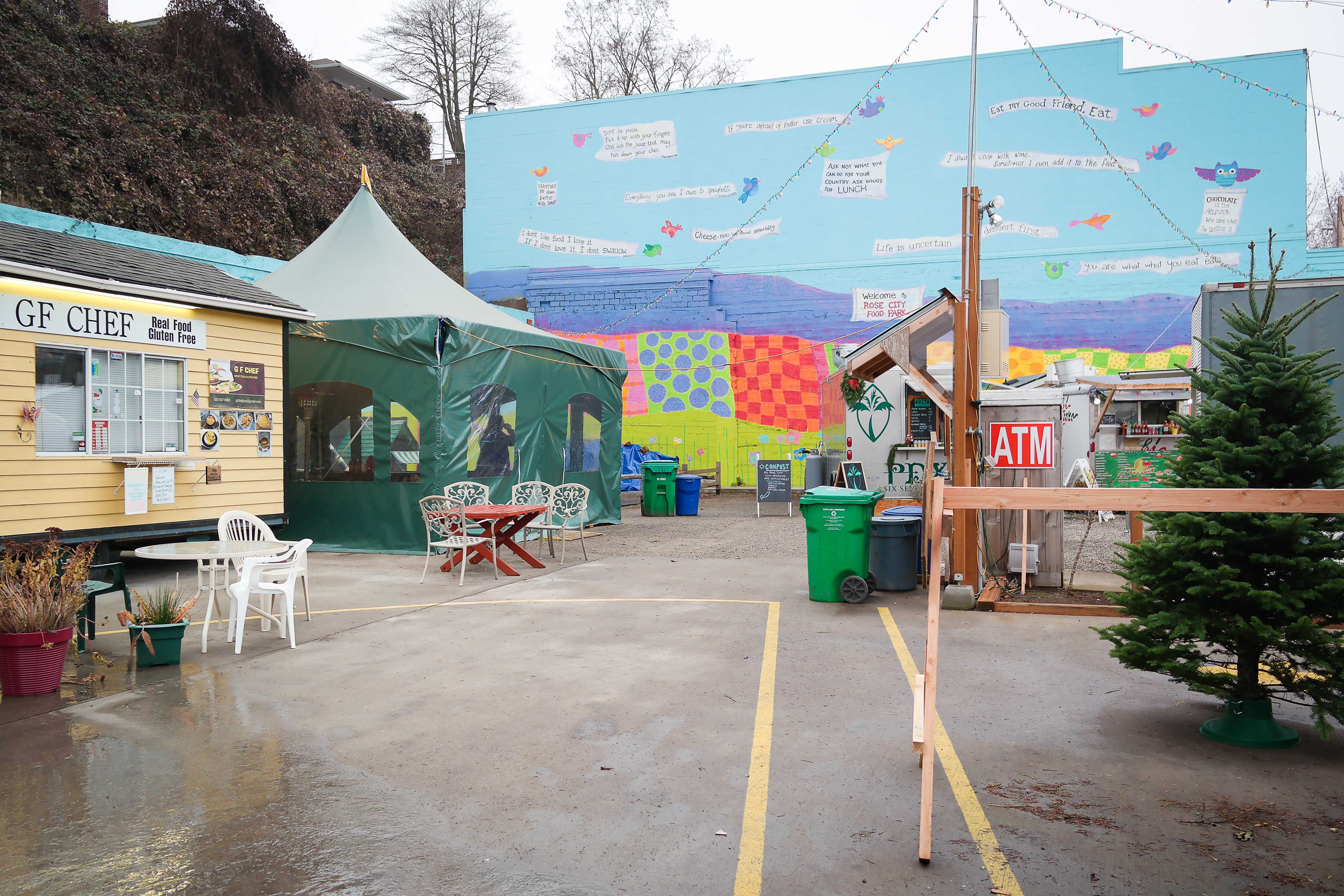
The pod in 2013

The pod was established in 2012. There is a beer garden serving beer and cider. RCFP has hosted carts serving a variety of food options, including barbecue, pizza, sandwiches, and vegan Mexican street food. The pod has also hosted carts serving Chinese, Hawaiian, and Thai cuisine. Tenants have included:

- Baby Blue Pizza
- Bangkok Xpress
- Bridgetown Bagel Company
- Buddy's Steaks
- Charlie's Breakfast Cart
- Chen's Express
- CoKiea's Kitchen
- Dagostino's Italian American Food
- El Guero
- Garcelon's Soup & Grilled Cheese
- J Vein Caffe
- Judah's Delicatessen
- Let's Roll (sushi)
- LoRell's Chicken Shack
- Macaroni in a Pot
- Magpie Bakery
- Moberi Smoothies
- The Mocking Bird
- Momo House
- Pause Japanese Bistro
- PDX671
- Ramy's Lamb Shack
- Rocket Breakfast
- Rockin' Robyn's Sassy Burger
- Skidbladnir
- The Sugar Shop

Three carts at the pod were vandalized in 2024.
