= Laurelwood Park =

Public park in Portland, Oregon, U.S.

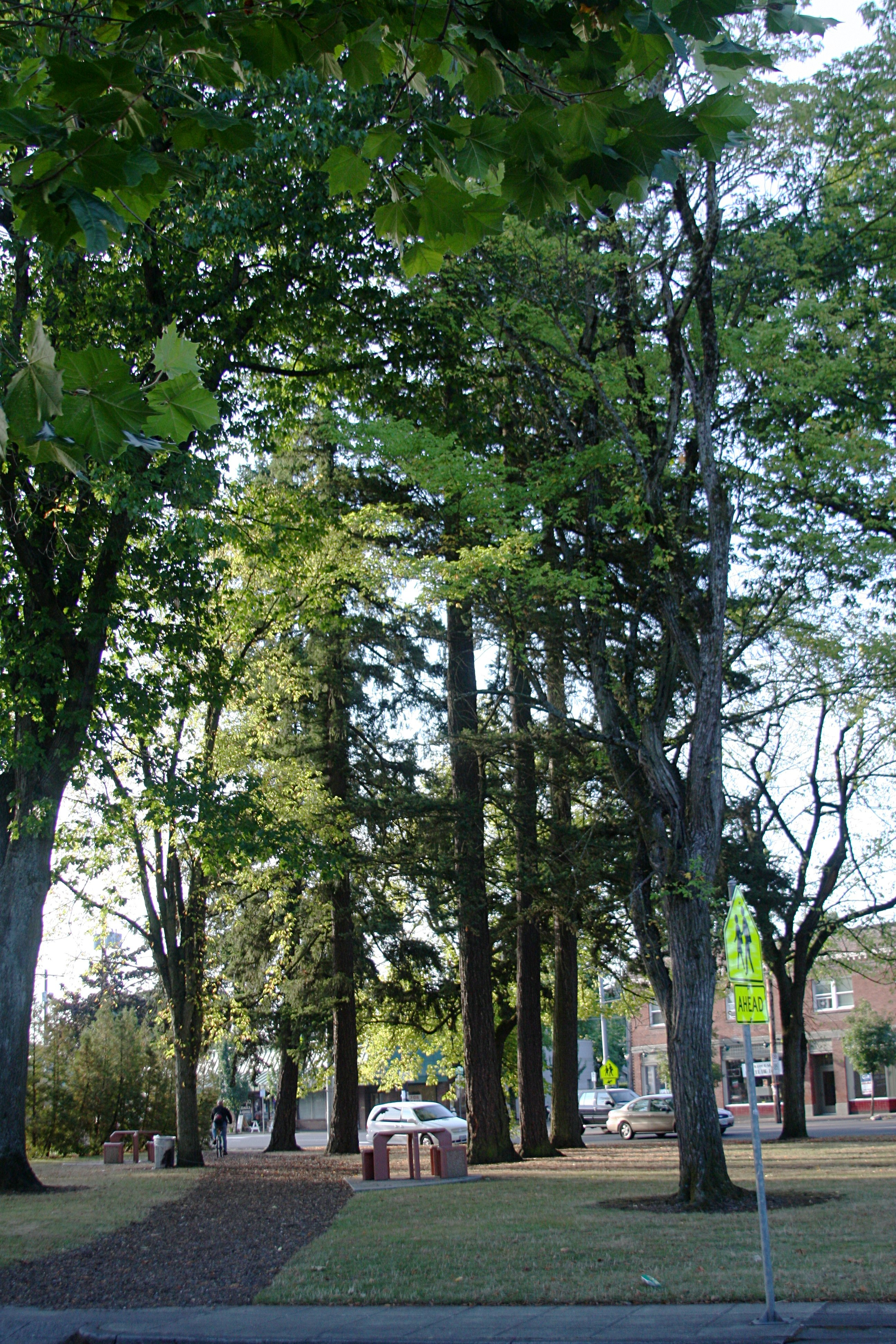
- The park in 2008
- Interactive map of Laurelwood Park
- Location: SE 64th St. and Foster Rd. Portland, Oregon
- Coordinates: 45°29′24″N 122°35′49″W
- Area: 0.42 acres (0.17 ha)
- Created: 1923
- Operator: Portland Parks & Recreation

Laurelwood Park is a .42-acre (0.17 ha) public park in Portland, Oregon's Foster-Powell neighborhood, in the United States. The wedge-shaped park was acquired in 1923 and underwent a major renovation in 2021.
