= Gracie's Apizza =

Defunct pizzeria in Portland, Oregon, U.S.

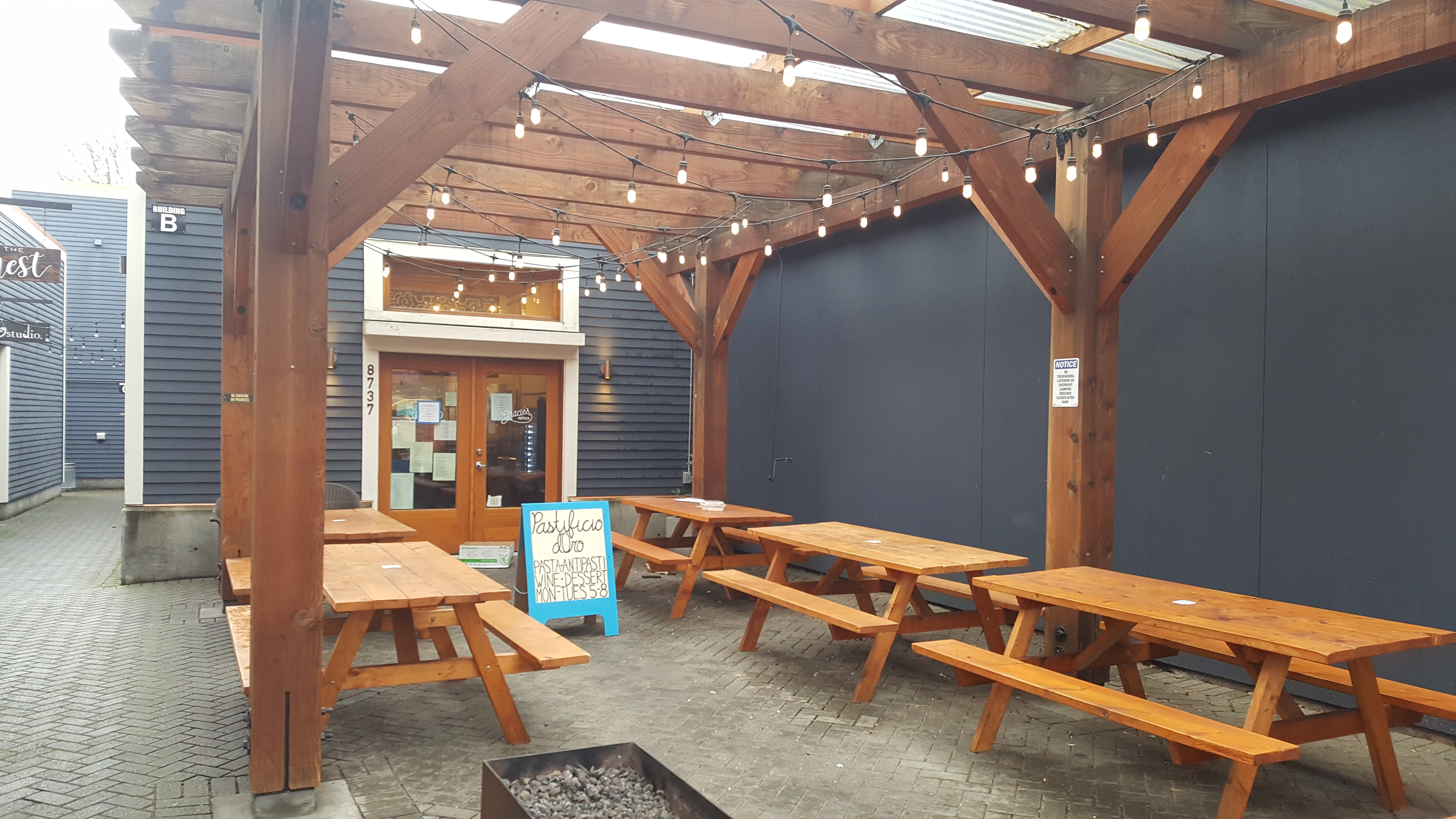
- The restaurant's exterior in 2022
- Interactive map of Gracie's Apizza

Restaurant information
- Owner: Craig Melilo
- Food type: Pizza
- Location: 7304 North Leavitt Avenue, Portland, Multnomah, Oregon, 97203, United States
- Coordinates: 45.5893°N 122.7540°W
- Website: graciesapizza.com

Gracie's Apizza was a pizzeria that operated from 2019 to 2026 in Portland, Oregon's St. Johns neighborhood, in the United States.

== Description ==
Gracie's Apizza was a pizzeria in North Portland's St. Johns neighborhood. Pizzas used Cairnspring Mills flour from Washington. The restaurant also served house-made ice cream.

== History ==
Owner Craig Melillo established Gracie's Apizza as a food cart in 2018. The brick and mortar restaurant opened in late 2019, in a space previously occupied by 24th and Meatballs.

In September 2021, the original Gracie's Apizza location was closed, and the space was replaced by Pastificio d'Oro. On May 3, 2023, the restaurant reopened at their current location. Gracie's shared a building with Starter Bread. On April 10, 2026, manager Josephine LaCosta announced the closure via social media.

== Reception ==
The Oregonian's Michael Russell included Gracie's Apizza in a 2018 list of the Portland's best new food carts and a 2020 list of the city's best new pizzerias. He also said in 2018 the restaurant served Portland's best calzone. Gracie's Apizza was nominated for Food Cart of the Year in Eater Portland's 2018 Eater Awards. In 2021, the website's Brooke Jackson-Glidden described the restaurant as "perpetually underrated". She and Alex Frane included Gracie's Apizza in a 2021 list of 17 "vital" food carts and restaurants in St. Johns.

== See also ==
- List of defunct restaurants of the United States
- Pizza in Portland, Oregon
