= Little T American Baker =

Bakery in Portland, Oregon, U.S.

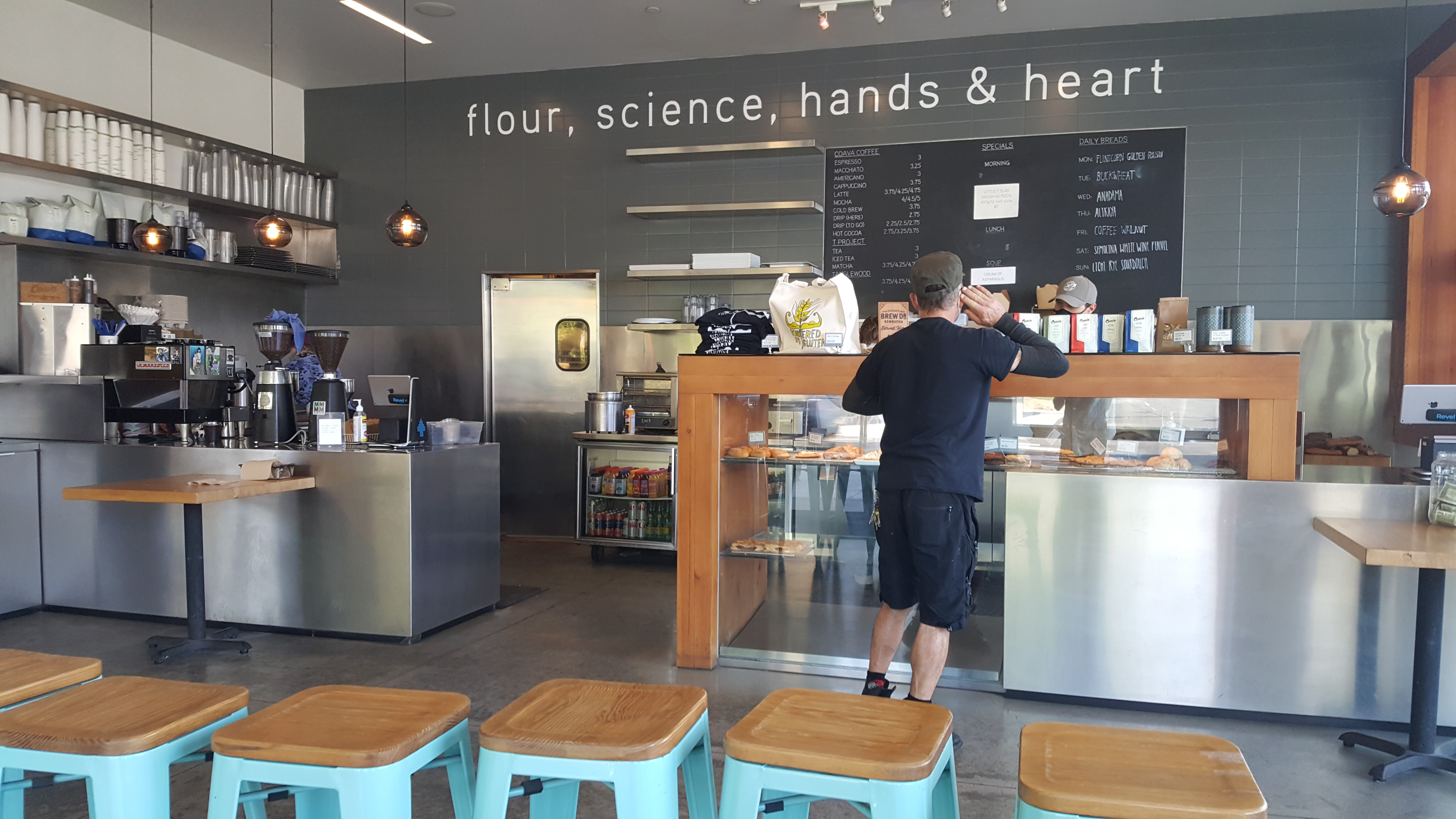
- The bakery's interior in 2022
- Interactive map of Little T American Baker

Restaurant information
- Location: Portland, Oregon, United States
- Coordinates: 45.5046°N 122.6394°W

Little T American Baker is a bakery in Portland, Oregon, United States.

== Description ==
Curtis Cook of Willamette Week said the bakery "offers novel takes on traditional breads and pastries, baked with ingredients sourced from local vendors and growers". The menu has included baguettes, chocolate chip cookies, croissants, tarts, and "slab bread" (focaccia-style flatbread with olive oil and sea salt).

== History ==
Tim Healea is the bakery's owners. Lee Posey of Nel Centro became baker of Little T in 2009. In 2013, Healea announced plans to open a second location (dubbed Little T Baker and nicknamed "Little T") in the West End's Union Way. The 400-square-foot space opened in October.

== Reception ==
In 2013, Little T ranked number 32 on The Daily Meal's list of America's 50 Best Bakeries. In 2015, Healea was a semifinalist in the James Beard Foundation Awards' Outstanding Baker category. Emmie Martin and Sarah Schmalbruch selected Little T to represent Oregon in Business Insider's 2015 list of the best bakeries in each U.S. state. Michelle Lopez included Little T in Eater Portland's 2021 overview of "Where to Find Flaky, Crackly Croissants in Portland". She and Brooke Jackson-Glidden included the bakery in the website's 2021 list of "Outstanding Bakeries in Portland and Beyond". Lopez and Janey Wong included the business in Eater Portland's 2025 overview of the city's best bakeries.

== See also ==
- List of bakeries
