= Foster-Powell, Portland, Oregon =

Foster-Powell
- Neighborhood
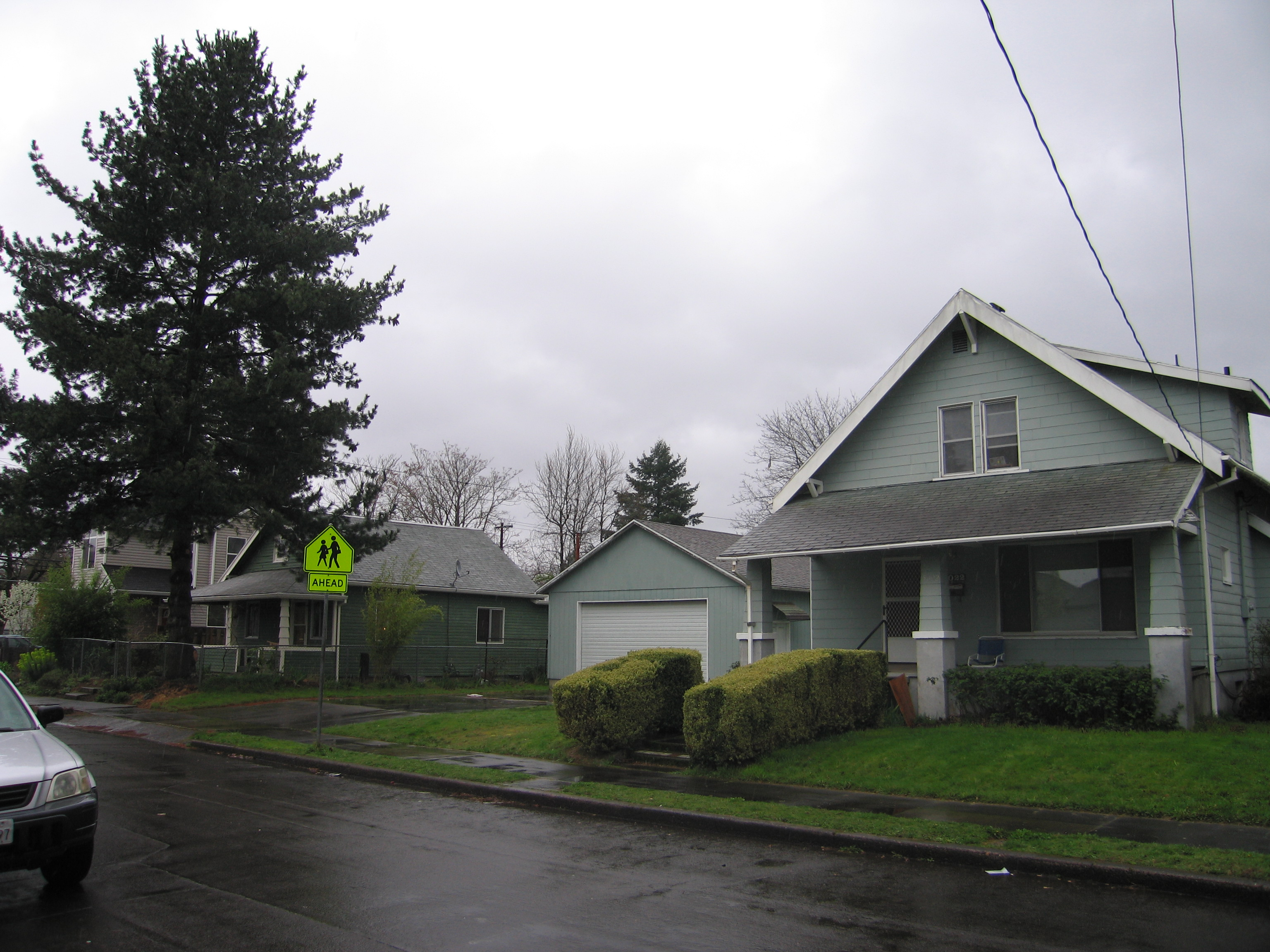
- Interactive map of Foster-Powell
- Coordinates: 45°29′28″N 122°35′21″W
- Country: United States
- State: Oregon
- City: Portland

Government
  - Association: Foster-Powell Neighborhood Association
  - Coalition: Southeast Uplift

Area
  - Total: 0.89 sq mi (2.30 km^{2})

Population (2000)
  - Total: 7,368
  - Density: 8,300/sq mi (3,200/km^{2})

Housing
  - No. of households: 2,776
  - Occupancy rate: 95% occupied
  - Owner-occupied: 1,678 households (60%)
  - Renting: 1,098 households (40%)
  - Avg. household size: 2.65 persons

Foster-Powell is a neighborhood in the Southeast section of Portland, Oregon. The triangular neighborhood is bounded by three major transit arteries: Powell Boulevard to the north, Foster Road to the south, and 82nd Avenue to the east.

== History ==
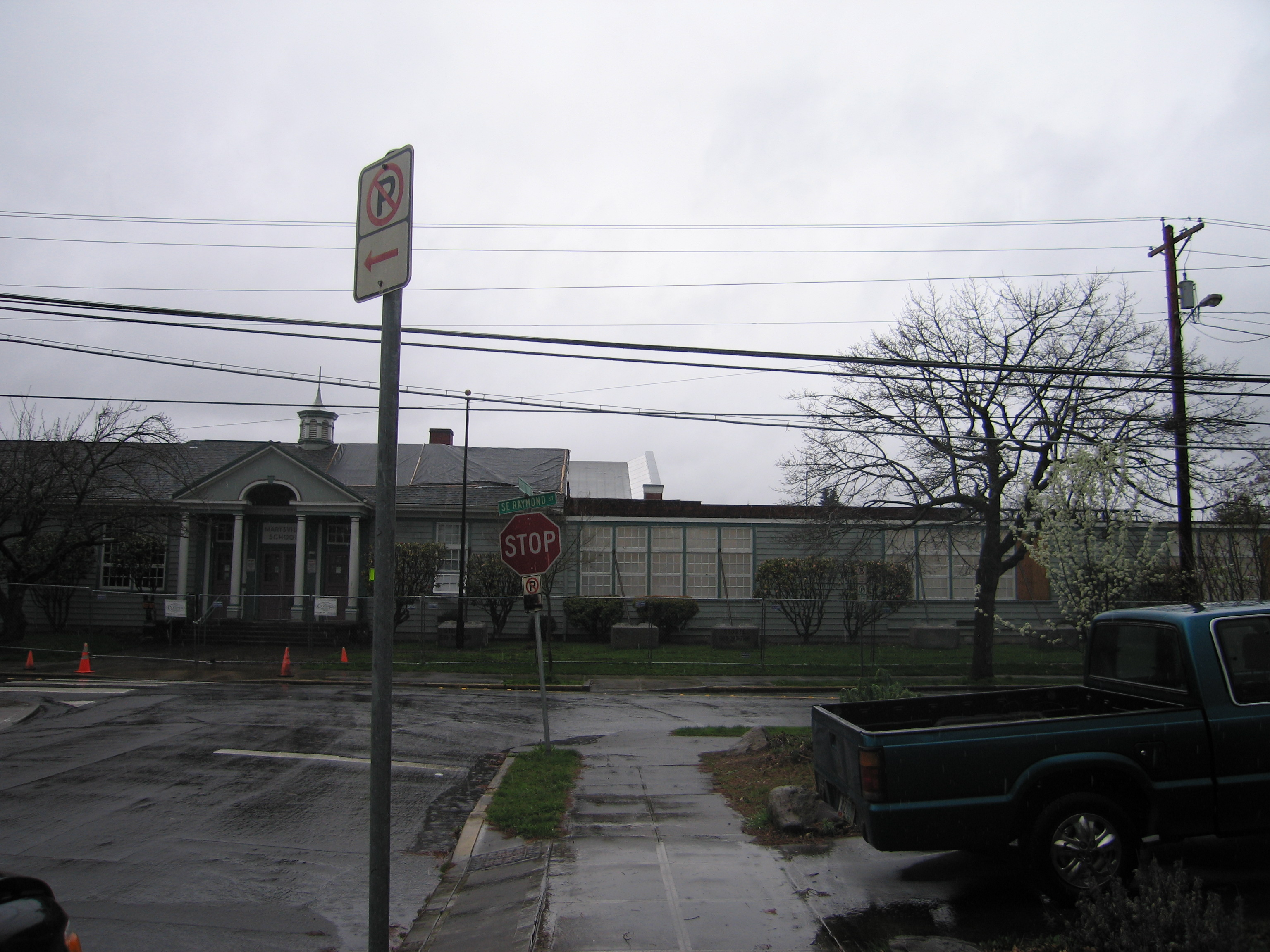
Fire Damage to Marysville Elementary, March 2010

It is likely that much of the construction in the Foster-Powell Neighborhood followed the construction of Portland's original electric streetcar line in the 1890s. The neighborhood's sidewalks were constructed in 1912. On November 10, 2009 the southeast wing of Foster-Powell's Marysville Elementary School burned down in what was attributed to an electrical fire.

== Transportation ==
All three roads bounding Foster-Powell are major transportation arteries, giving the neighborhood easy automobile access to the city center via westbound Foster or Powell, North Portland or Clackamas via 82nd, or the interstate via eastbound on Foster. All three roads are home to frequent service Trimet bus lines: the 14 links Foster to Hawthorne and downtown; the 9 links Powell Blvd. with downtown and Northeast Portland, and the 72 runs on 82nd from Clackamas Town Center to North Killingsworth Avenue. Additionally, the 17 runs down Holgate Avenue to downtown and North Portland.

The distance to bike from Foster-Powell to downtown is about 45 minutes to an hour, depending on where in the neighborhood you begin. Though Foster-Powell is bounded by heavily trafficked roads not ideal for bicyclists, there is an east-west bike route through the neighborhood on Center Street, and just north of the neighborhood on Woodward Street.

The official plan for the future extension of the Portland Streetcar envisions a line running down Foster. There has also been discussion of constructing a new MAX light rail line on Powell Blvd. Both plans, however, remain on the drawing board.

== Geography ==
Foster-Powell is home to three parks: Essex Park on 79th and Center, Kern Park on 66th and Center, and Laurelwood Park at the intersection of Foster Road and Holgate Boulevard. Additionally, the Firland Parkway, a median with large trees in the middle of 72nd Ave between Foster and Holgate, also lies within the neighborhood. Most of the commercial activity occurs at the fringes of the neighborhood – on Powell, Foster and 82nd, while the interior is largely residential.

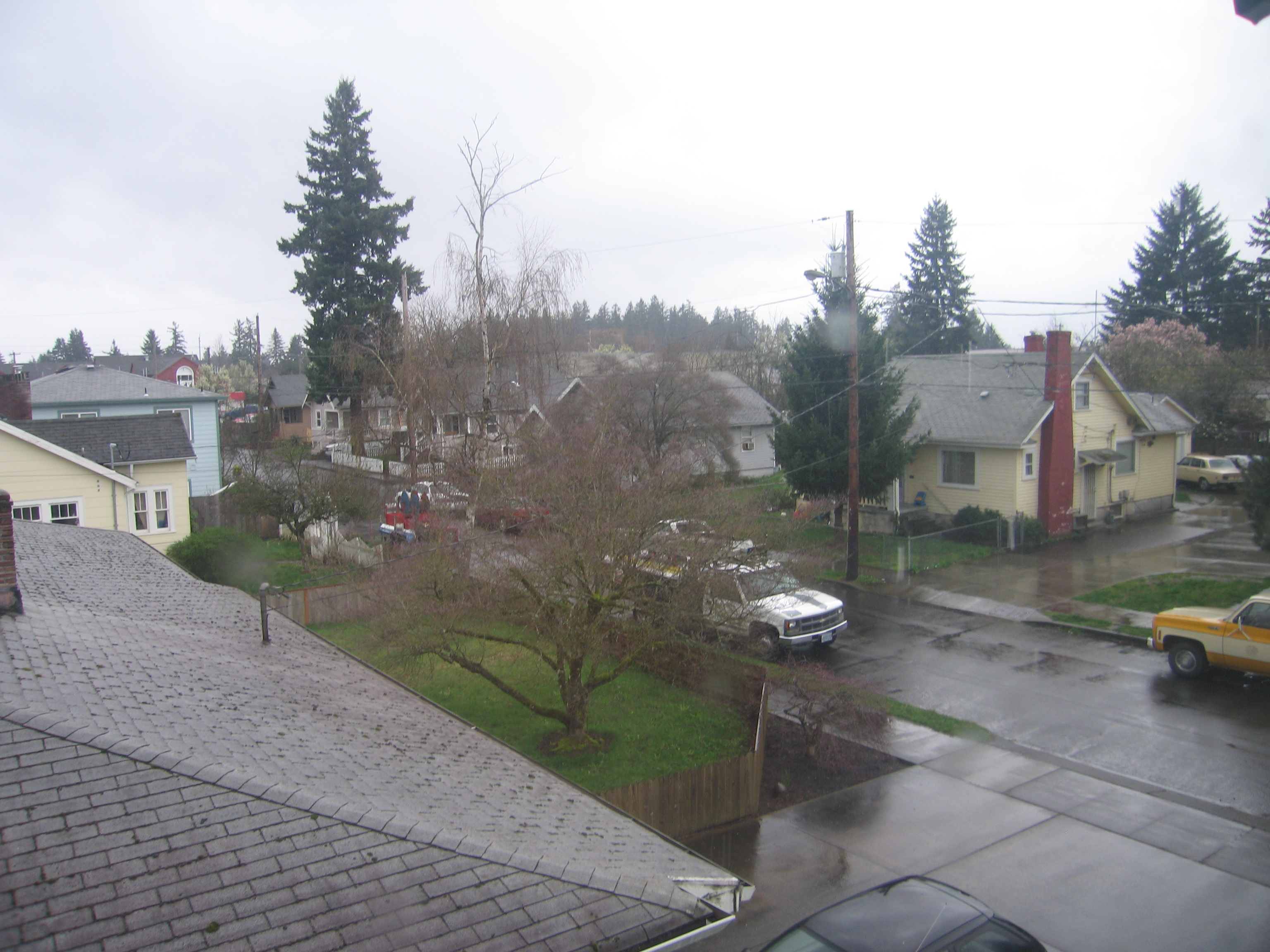
Typical Foster Powell street scene, March 2010

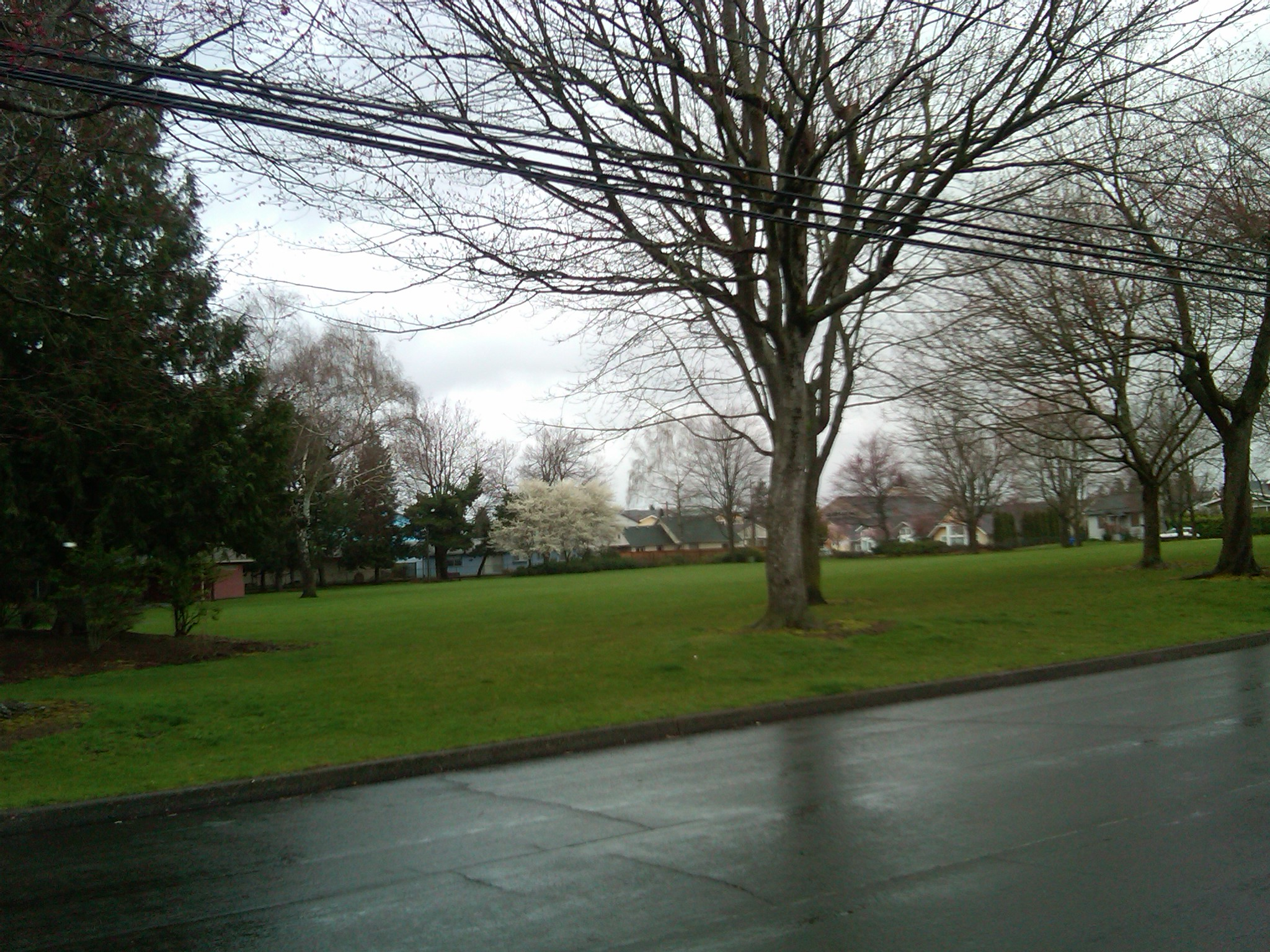
Essex Park, looking north from SE Center

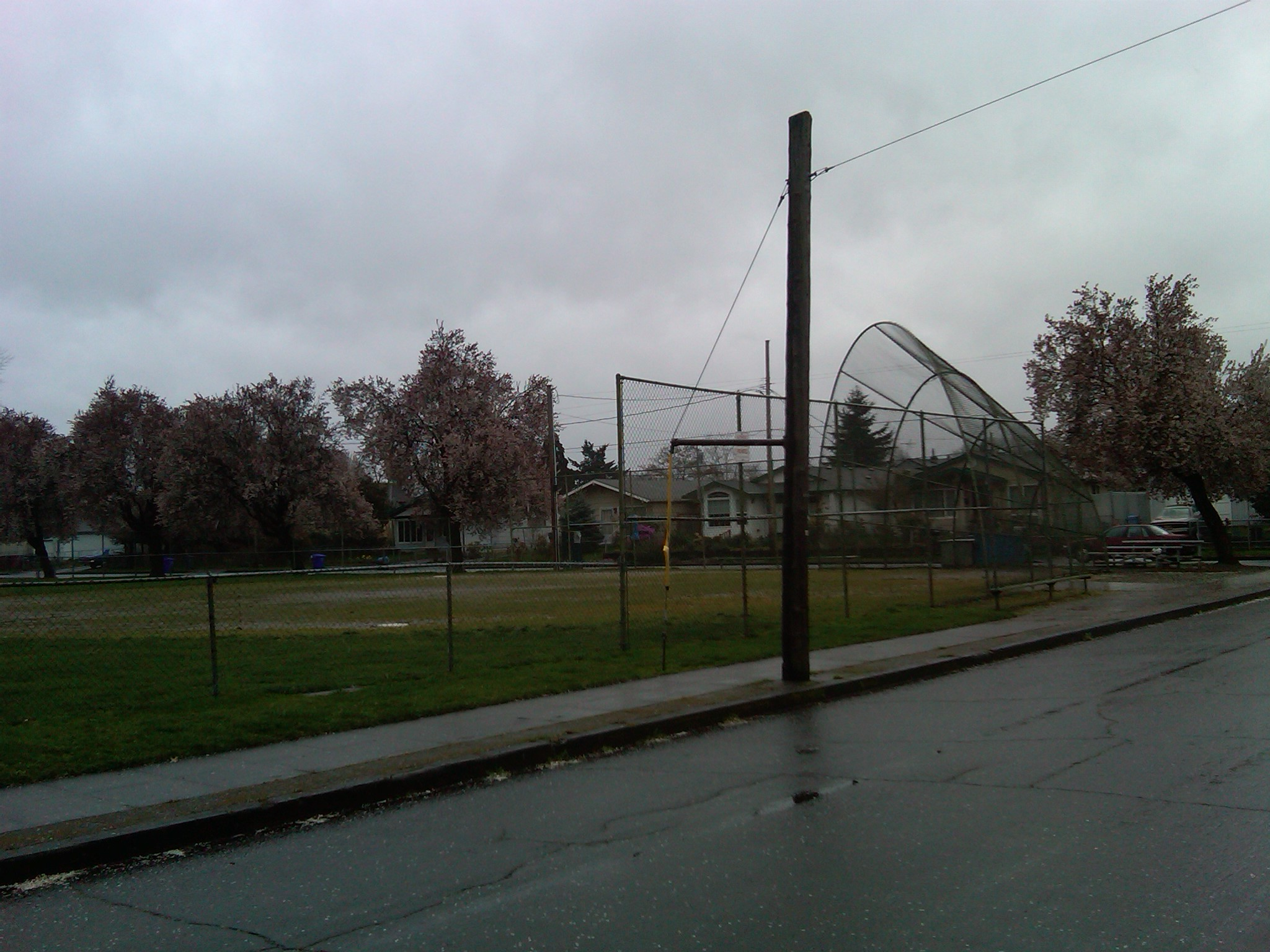
Kern Park, looking at corner of 66th and SE Center

== Demographics ==
Foster-Powell has gained a reputation as an ethnically diverse neighborhood, with growth in the neighborhood's Russian, Vietnamese, Chinese, and Hispanic populations. This population increase was measured through increases in the circulation of Russian, Vietnamese, Chinese and Spanish-language materials at Multnomah County Library's Foster-Powell location at 79th and Holgate.
