= Lulu Luscious =

American drag performer

- Lulu Luscious at RuPaul's DragCon LA, 2017
- Born: James Luu; 1988 or 1989 (age 37–38)
- Education: University of Puget Sound
- Occupation: Drag queen

Lulu Luscious is the stage name of James Luu, an American drag performer based in Portland, Oregon. Lulu Luscious has performed at Darcelle XV Showplace, competed in the La Femme Magnifique International Pageant, and participated in various community events. During the COVID-19 pandemic, she performed in and organized Shine Distillery and Grill's drive-through series of drag shows.

Outside of drag, Luu has worked at his family's restaurant, been a property manager, and hosted events to sell sex toys.

== Early life and education ==
Luu was born to Vietnamese immigrants who moved to Portland, Oregon in 1985. He was raised in Portland and attended Parkrose High School, where he was the student government president.

Luu studied business, communications, and marketing at college. In 2009, he became the first sophomore elected student government president at the University of Puget Sound in Tacoma, Washington. He graduated in 2011.

== Career ==
After college, Luu moved to Vancouver, British Columbia, where he worked multiple jobs. In addition to working at his family's restaurant, he was a property manager and translated contracts into Vietnamese.

Luu started performing in drag during trips to Portland, participating in red dress parties and eventually developing the persona Lulu Luscious. According to Willamette Week, the name Lulu Lucious was created "by turning his family name into the feminine Lulu and adding an alliterative adjective". Luu has also hosted parties as Lulu Luscious to sell sex toys for Las Vegas-based Passion Parties. Passion Parties was sold to Pure Romance, which only hires female consultants. This prompted Luu to file an employment complaint with the Oregon Bureau of Labor and Industries.

Since performing in her first drag show in Portland in 2013, Lulu Luscious has participated in various events. She has performed at Darcelle XV Showplace and competed in the La Femme Magnifique International Pageant. She won the pageant in 2015, and has also been named Miss HIV Awareness. In 2016, Lulu Luscious emceed a fashion show and fundraiser at the Crystal Ballroom; proceeds from the event benefitted the nonprofit organizations Oregon Dress for Success and Project Lemonade. She hosted the afterparty and drag competition So You Think You Can Drag at the Paris Theatre in 2017. During the COVID-19 pandemic, she performed in Shine Distillery and Grill's drive-through series of drag shows, alongside Bolivia Carmichaels and Nicole Onoscopi. Lulu Luscious was credited as the series' main organizer.

== Personal life ==
Luu relocated to Portland in 2013. As of 2016, he lived in a townhouse in Gresham with his mother.

Luu was raised Buddhist. He is gay and speaks fluent Vietnamese. He attended his first drag show at a gay bar in Washington, D.C.

== See also ==
- LGBTQ culture in Portland, Oregon
- List of drag queens
- List of LGBTQ people from Portland, Oregon
- List of people from Portland, Oregon
- List of University of Puget Sound alumni
