= Nicole Onoscopi =

American drag performer

- Born: Albany, Oregon, United States
- Other name: Cole Cozart
- Occupation: Drag queen

Nicole Onoscopi is the stage name of Cole Cozart, an American drag performer based in Portland, Oregon. Nicole Onoscopi was first runner-up and the first Miss'd Popularity in the annual drag pageant Miss'd America in 2019, and was named Miss Gay Oregon in 2021 and Miss Portland Gay Pride in 2024. She has performed throughout Oregon, including at pride events in her native Albany as well as McMinnville, Portland, and Salem.

== Career ==
Nicole Onoscopi is a drag performer. In 2019, she was first runner-up at Miss'd America, an annual drag pageant in Atlantic City, New Jersey. Nicole Onoscopi was also named the first Miss'd Popularity at the same pageant, based on audience vote. She was named Miss Gay Oregon in 2021 and Miss Portland Gay Pride in 2024.

In Portland, Nicole Onoscopi has hosted Drag Brunch PDX, described as a traveling drag brunch at various venues such as Alberta Street Pub, Moxy Portland Downtown (with the Filipino restaurant Sun Rice), and the gay bar Stag PDX. In 2021, she was part of Shine Distillery and Grill's Drag Thru series with Bolivia Carmichaels and Lulu Luscious. She also performed at the restaurant's 'Sparkle and Shine Drag Brunch', as of 2023. For the Drag-a-thon, which was held at Darcelle XV Showplace in 2023 and set a Guinness World Record for the longest drag stage show, Nicole Onoscopi performed "Flowers" (2023) by Miley Cyrus, "Shake It Off" (2014) by Taylor Swift, "Cotton-Eyed Joe", "Baby Got Back" (1992) by Sir Mix-a-Lot, and "It's All Coming Back to Me Now" (1989) by Celine Dion. She was also a featured performer in 'Sea Sickening Boat pRide', a pride event on the Portland Spirit organized by the local chapter of the Sisters of Perpetual Indulgence, with Mariah Paris Balenciaga.

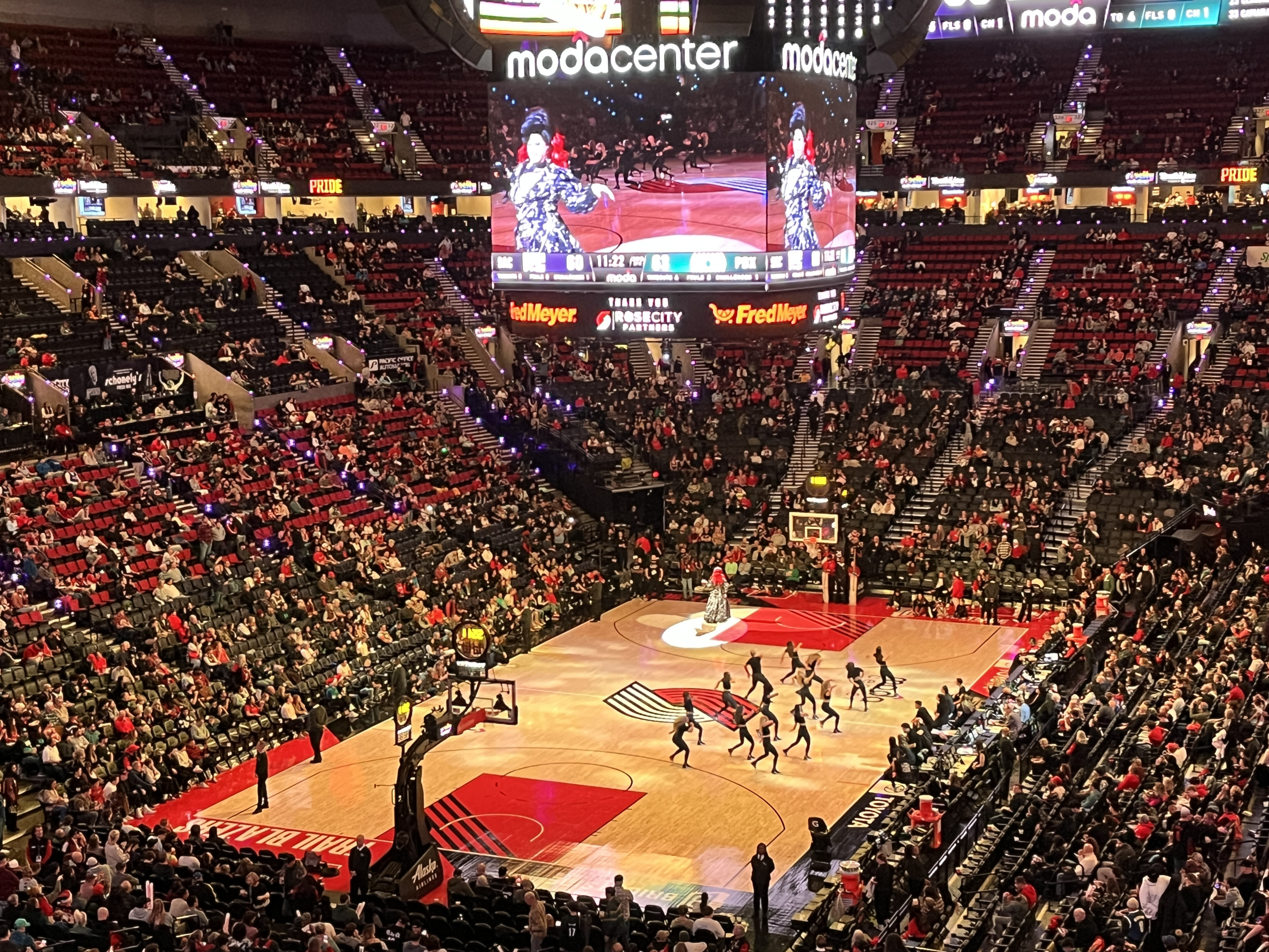
Nicole Onoscopi performing during the halftime show at a Portland Trail Blazers game designated "Pride Night", Moda Center, December 2025

In 2024, Nicole Onoscopi was among approximately 100 volunteers who participated in a pride-themed clean-up effort in downtown organized by SOLVE, and she was part of KOIN's photo booth at the Waterfront Blues Festival. She was a Pride Northwest pageant winner in 2024, earning her an invitation to represent the LGBTQ community in Portland's annual pride parade. In December, she was part of the halftime show at a Portland Trail Blazers game designated as a "Pride Night". In 2025, she and Saint Syndrome hosted the live drag music show Queen's Keys at Star Theater. Nicole Onoscopi also opened for Alaska Thunderfuck when the latter's annual holiday special A Very Alaska Christmas Show was held at Aladdin Theater. She was a finalist in the Best Drag Queen category of Willamette Week's annual 'Best of Portland' readers' poll in 2025. In 2026, Nicole Onoscopi and Bolivia Carmichaels were co-hosts of the annual pride parade. The two were based at the parade's "hub" at the gay bar CC Slaughters. Nicole Onoscopi and her husband offered commentary during Portland's second annual Parallel Parking Competition in August 2026.

Nicole Onoscopi has also performed at pride-related events outside of Portland. After performing at Albany Civic Theater for years, she co-hosted the venue's first drag show in 2023. In 2022, she was part of Dragstravaganza, a benefit brunch and drag show hosted by an inn and winery in McMinnville, in conjunction with Pride Month. In Salem, she has performed at Capital Pride and hosted drag brunch at Infinity Room. She performed "Don't Stop Believin'" (1981) by Journey during a drag show she hosted at Albany Pride in 2024. She performed at a drag brunch in conjunction with pride festivities in Seattle in 2026. In August 2026, Nicole Onoscopi was one of 25 performers who broke an "unofficial, official" record for the most number of drag queens in a hot air balloon, in Newberg.

== Personal life ==
Originally from Albany, Cozart is based in Portland, as of 2024. Previously, he lived in New York City in 2019.

Cozart is married to Josh Cozart, a meteorologist for KOIN, and uses the pronouns she/her when in drag.

== See also ==
- LGBTQ culture in Portland, Oregon
- List of drag queens
- List of LGBTQ people from Portland, Oregon
- List of people from Portland, Oregon
