= Brett Bigham =

American educator

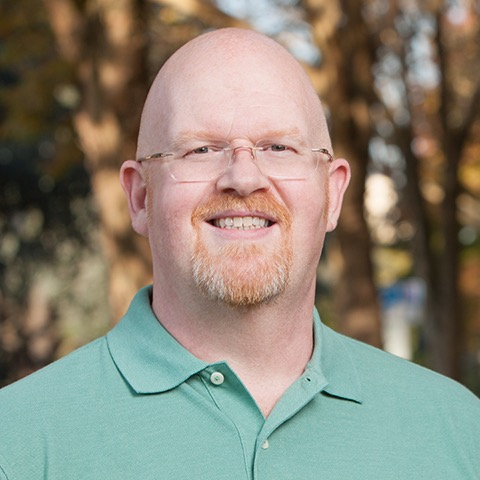
- Occupation: Special Education Teacher
- Known for: Oregon State Teacher of the Year, National Education Association National Award for Teaching Excellence, NEA LGBTQ Teacher Role Model Award recipient, NEA Foundation Global Fellow, Bank of America Neighborhood Hero. Christian Science Monitor EqualEd Advisory Board.
- Notable work: Ability guidebooks

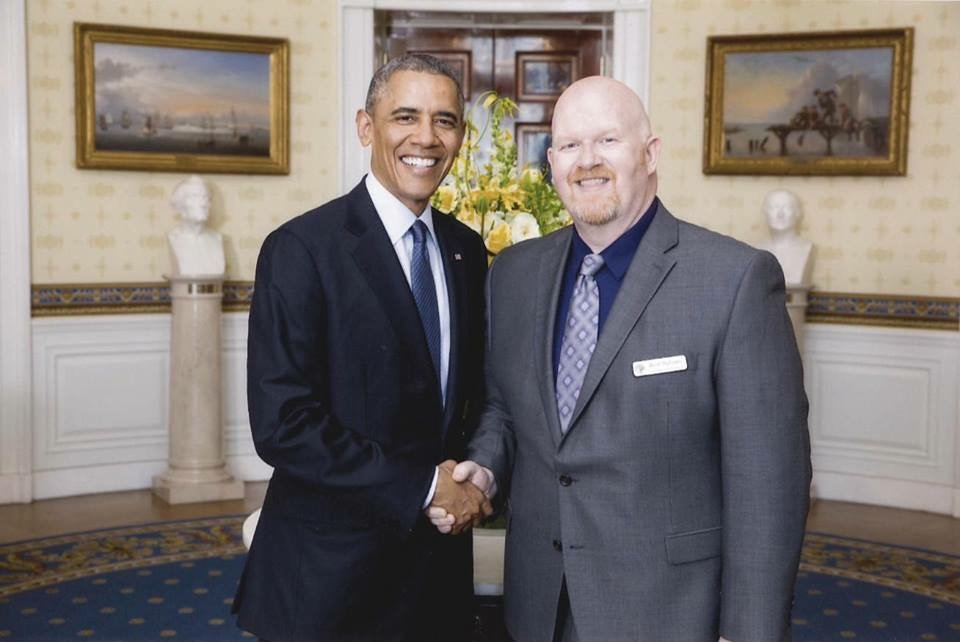
President Obama with Oregon State Teacher of the Year Brett Bigham at the White House Honoring Ceremony, May 1, 2014.

Brett Bigham is an American educator. He has won multiple teaching awards for his work as a special education teacher. After publicly declaring that he was gay while accepting an award, Bigham began to have conflicts with his school district. These conflicts led to his firing which caused upheaval in Bigham's district and with Bigham eventually receiving a large financial settlement from the district. Bigham has authored several guidebooks for those with autism.

== Work as an educator ==
Bigham and his class hosted a citywide prom for youth with disabilities who needed to attend a prom during school hours. It was featured nationwide on NPR and in the monthly newsletter from the United States Department of Education. Bigham was awarded the Bank of America Neighborhood Hero Award for organizing the prom, as well as the Bob Speltzer Community Service Award by the Q Center for his work on LGBT issues. He also received the Community Hero Award in Education from PHAME for his work with the special needs population. Bigham was named Outstanding Special Educator of the Year by the National Association of Special Education Teachers and he was a finalist and Circle of Excellence Winner of the OnPoint Prize for Outstanding Educators. Bigham was named a Kentucky Colonel in 2014 for his work in special education. In 2014-15, Bigham was featured in Portland State University's "Fearless" campaign and was the keynote speaker at the 2014 PSU hooding ceremony.

Bigham created an online resource of guidebooks for people with autism. There are over 170 of these Ability Guidebooks in 38 countries in six languages. He later wrote a guide about autism and air travel for the Portland International Airport. Bigham was honored for this by being named as an Autism Light, one of 442 people internationally who have been recognized for their dedication to people who are autistic.

Bigham was a keynote speaker for the Save Our Schools Rally at the Lincoln Memorial in July, 2016 along with Diane Ravitch and the Reverend William Barber. Bigham's August, 2016 meeting with Dr. Stephen Hawking included a scarfing for the Portland Timbers that trended on Twitter and was covered by Major League Soccer and Univision and many other media outlets.

Bigham was named to the NEA Foundation Global Fellowship in both 2015 for Peru and 2018 for South Africa. In March 2018 Bigham travelled to Bangladesh through Asha Inc. to work with the country's first special education programs. He is also the first Special Education columnist for The Teaching Channel.

He was the 2014 Oregon Teacher of the Year, was the 2015 Oregon Education Association Teacher of the Year, and was a 2015 National Education Association California Casualty Award for Teaching Excellence. Bigham was the first teacher to hold both state awards currently and the first Oregon special education teacher to be named state teacher of the year. He was fired less than a year later after filing state and federal complaints against the Multnomah Education Service District for discrimination over his sexual orientation, retaliation and harassment. The state investigation supported these allegations. The district paid Bigham a large settlement. He was honored at a White House ceremony on May 1, 2014.

== Gay rights activism ==
Bigham is one of the first openly homosexual teachers to be named a Teacher of the Year nationally. He came to prominence when his education service district ordered him not to say he was gay publicly, demanded the right to monitor his speaking and writing both personal and public, and then illegally fired him when he refused to allow district control of his speech. Despite being under orders from his district not to, Bigham made a statement to the White House Press Corps following his honoring ceremony saying he was openly gay and calling for the ending of bullying of LGBT youth. Bigham continued to support LGBT youth despite his orders. He also continued in his advocacy role for people with special needs (radio interview KMUZ Special Needs, Special People).

On May 17, 2014, the day gay marriage became legal in Oregon, Bigham married his long-term partner, Mike Turay. The Oregonian, Oregon's largest news agency, ran 40 pictures and a video of the full ceremony online. Bigham was still under orders not to say he was gay in public. In June, Bigham and Turay became the first gay couple to ride in the Portland Rose Festival Grand Floral Parade.

Bigham was told he could not introduce a gay student choir at a concert on a Sunday, he could not meet with Oregon Safe Schools Coalition, a group that fights anti-gay bullying, and he was told he could not speak to a local high school gay alliance club. His supervisor informed him in writing that meeting with these students had "no value to the district." Bigham filed state and federal complaints against these actions and went to the press.

When Bigham was named the 2015 Oregon Education Association's Educator of Excellence, the district accepted the prize money but barred him from attending the ceremony to receive his award. The district then tried to get Bigham to drop his state and federal complaints by offering to allow him to attend the ceremony if he withdrew them. Bigham went public with the alleged blackmail attempt and demanded an investigation into the actions of the superintendent, and called for the termination of the head of Human Resources ("Emails show district tried to blackmail Teacher of the Year").

In March, the district terminated its superintendent and barred her from the building.

Bigham was placed on leave on March 20. The story made international news. He filed additional complaints at the state and federal level for retaliation and illegal labor practices.

Bigham was fired in April and filed additional state and federal complaints of retaliation over his illegal firing. The district stated Bigham was fired for missing too many days as Teacher of the Year and because he refused mediation. Bigham provided copies of his schedule to prove he had administrative pre-approval for every absence. He refused mediation with the district because they demanded he retract his state and federal complaints before mediation could occur. Bigham refused to be coerced or retract the complaints.

The district reinstated Bigham when the union filed state paperwork in his support. The district then announced they were firing Bigham at the next board meeting. The district cancelled that meeting following a flood of calls and emails from the public and petitions for the board to be censured. They then announced publicly Bigham would be fired the following month, while privately offering him a sizable settlement at the same time.

Bigham's situation became one of the main topics during the May 2015 school board election. Three new school board members were elected. Two of them demanded better treatment for Bigham. A fourth board member resigned immediately after the election.

== Settlement ==
Bigham accepted a settlement from the district and resigned his position in June 2015. He was still the sitting Oregon Education Association Teacher of Excellence. He was also the current Oregon teacher selected to be a National Education Association Foundation Global Fellow. He refused a non-disclosure agreement as part of the settlement.

The Oregon Bureau of Labor and Industries investigation was released and found "substantial evidence of discrimination". The Bureau released the full investigation including interviews of all parties. In the interviews during the state investigation the superintendent walked out after refusing questions; Bigham's supervisor, Kelly Raf, also refused to answer questions.

The district parted ways with their head of Human Resources in September. The head of special education was transferred, the head of Bigham's program was demoted, and his supervisor left the district.

Bigham's case was given coverage nationally over the issue of work place discrimination.

In July 2015, Bigham was given the National Education Association LGBT Caucus Teacher Role Model Award at the National Education Association National Conference. He was the keynote speaker.

In September 2015, Bigham published an essay entitled Teacher of the Year in the book One Teacher in Ten in the New Millennium, edited by Kevin Jennings.

Bigham was named to the Board of Directors of Directors of Oregon Safe Schools, one of the groups he was told he could not meet with in October 2015. He also serves on the board of Clubfunder, a group that provides funding for Gay Student Alliance clubs. He is a member of the Portland Art Museum's Teacher Advisory Board. Bigham appeared in front of Portland Mayor Charles Hales, along with Cameron Whitten, to advocate for cultural diversity in the classroom.

In December, 2015 Multnomah Education Service District was fined by the state of Oregon for releasing Bigham's personal information to the public. They were fined for nine counts of violating state law.

Bigham's case has been referenced by The American Bar Association.

Bigham continued to be a voice for LGBT teachers and students. An April 2018 interview by the Chicago Tribune used a quote by Bigham as the headline of the Article in reference to the difficulty LGBT teachers face.

== Ability guidebooks and other education work ==
Bigham began a series of support books for people with autism entitled Ability Guidebooks. These books are step-by-step instructions on how to visit community destinations. The original series were books for the Portland, Oregon area including I Am Going UP on the Portland Aerial Tram! In May 2014 Bigham was recognized at the White House by President Barack Obama. Bigham used this and future visits to begin a series of books for the Washington, D.C. area including I Am Going To The National Museum of the American Indian, I Am Going to the Supreme Court and I Am Going to the Renwick Gallery! When Bigham was named an NEA Foundation Global Fellow he was sent to Peru as an ambassador of U.S. education. During this visit Bigham created his first international Ability Guidebooks for the Inca Museum in Cusco, Machu Picchu, Kennedy Park, The Love Park and the Larco Museum. There are now more than 148 Ability Guidebooks in 36 countries and in six languages.

In March 2018 Bigham appeared on the front page of the Portland Tribune in an interview about Bigham traveling to Bangladesh to mentor teachers and share best practice. Effort to send Portland teacher, supplies to Bangladesh could have lasting impact on nation's special education

Bigham is the Co-Editor of the National Network of State Teachers of the Year NNSTOY Social Justice Book List.

In 2018 Bigham was named a LEAE Leading Educator Ambassador for Equity by ECRA Education Civil Rights Alliance.

Bigham has had essays published in One Teacher in Ten In the New Millennium by Kevin Jennings and Gender Diversity and LGBTQ Inclusion in K-12 Schools, A Guide to Supporting Students and Changing Lives by Sharon Verner Chappell, Karyl E. Ketchum and Lisa Richardson. He is one of the NEA Foundation Global Learning Fellows that helped author 12 Lessons to Open Classrooms and Minds to the World along with Fernando M. Reimers, Dr Robert Adams and Kristen Shannon and he was interviewed and quoted in Think Like Socrates by US National Teacher of the Year Shanna Peeples.

== See also ==
- List of LGBT people from Portland, Oregon
