= Matt Alber =

American singer-songwriter

- Born: February 6, 1975 (age 51)
- Origin: Kansas, United States
- Genres: Folk rock, Alternative
- Occupations: Singer-songwriter
- Instruments: vocals, acoustic guitar, piano
- Labels: Silver Label, Lonesome Dandelion
- Website: www.mattalber.com

Matt Alber (born February 6, 1975) is an American singer-songwriter, filmmaker, and youth advocate based in Portland, Oregon.

== Early life ==
Alber was born in Wichita, Kansas, and raised in St. Louis, Missouri. He began singing as a child and studied music and vocal training at Truman State University in Kirksville, Missouri.

== Career ==
Alber was a member of the Grammy-award-winning all-male vocal ensemble Chanticleer from 1998 until 2003 when he left to pursue a solo career. Alber released his first album, Nonchalant, in 2005. It was co-produced with Jeff Crerie at Utmosis Studios in San Francisco. Some of the album's material was re-worked for his major label debut three years later. The album has since gone out of print. In 2008, Alber released Hide Nothing through Silver Label, a division of Tommy Boy Records. The leading single from the album, "End of the World" went viral after gay-entertainment television channel Logo TV popularized its accompanying music video through its now-defunct "Click List" segment. At the time, Alber's relationship was suffering, and the song was written as a last-attempt to save it. Unhappy with his label's approach to creating music, Alber left Tommy Boy Records in 2010 and has since been releasing his music independently.

Alber followed Hide Nothing with 2011's Constant Crows, which found the singer experimenting more with folk music and torch songs. Alber stated in an interview with The Herald Palladium that the second record was influenced by his stripped-down, acoustic live performances, which was a change from the "dreamy" and starry-eyed sound from his debut. This sound was later further expanded on 2014's Wind Sand Stars, which was Alber's first full-length LP to be released on vinyl. Following the release of his second album, Alber became an icon for the bear community, modeling as a pin-up for Meat Magazine in 2013.

== Personal life ==
Alber is gay and advocates for LGBTQ youth as part of his career. In an interview with About.com's travel section, Alber was quoting as saying, "I am very happy to have a lot of gay fans. I'm not saying I'm a spokesman for my people, but I love singing to my people. Especially gay guys who are all lovey dovey with each other. Because so often I cruise men, clicking them away in [computer] windows, and being predictably kind of cold to them."

Alber has a tattoo on his wrist that reads "Squire", which is one of his nicknames.

== Discography ==
- Nonchalant (2005)
- Hide Nothing (2008)
- Constant Crows (2011)
- Wind Sand Stars (2014)
- Matt Alber – Live in San Francisco (2016)
- How High the Moon (2018)

=== DVDs ===
- Matt Alber with Strings Attached: The Cello Street Quartet Sessions (2012)

== See also ==
- List of LGBT people from Portland, Oregon
