= Embers Avenue =

Defunct gay bar and nightclub in Portland, Oregon, U.S.

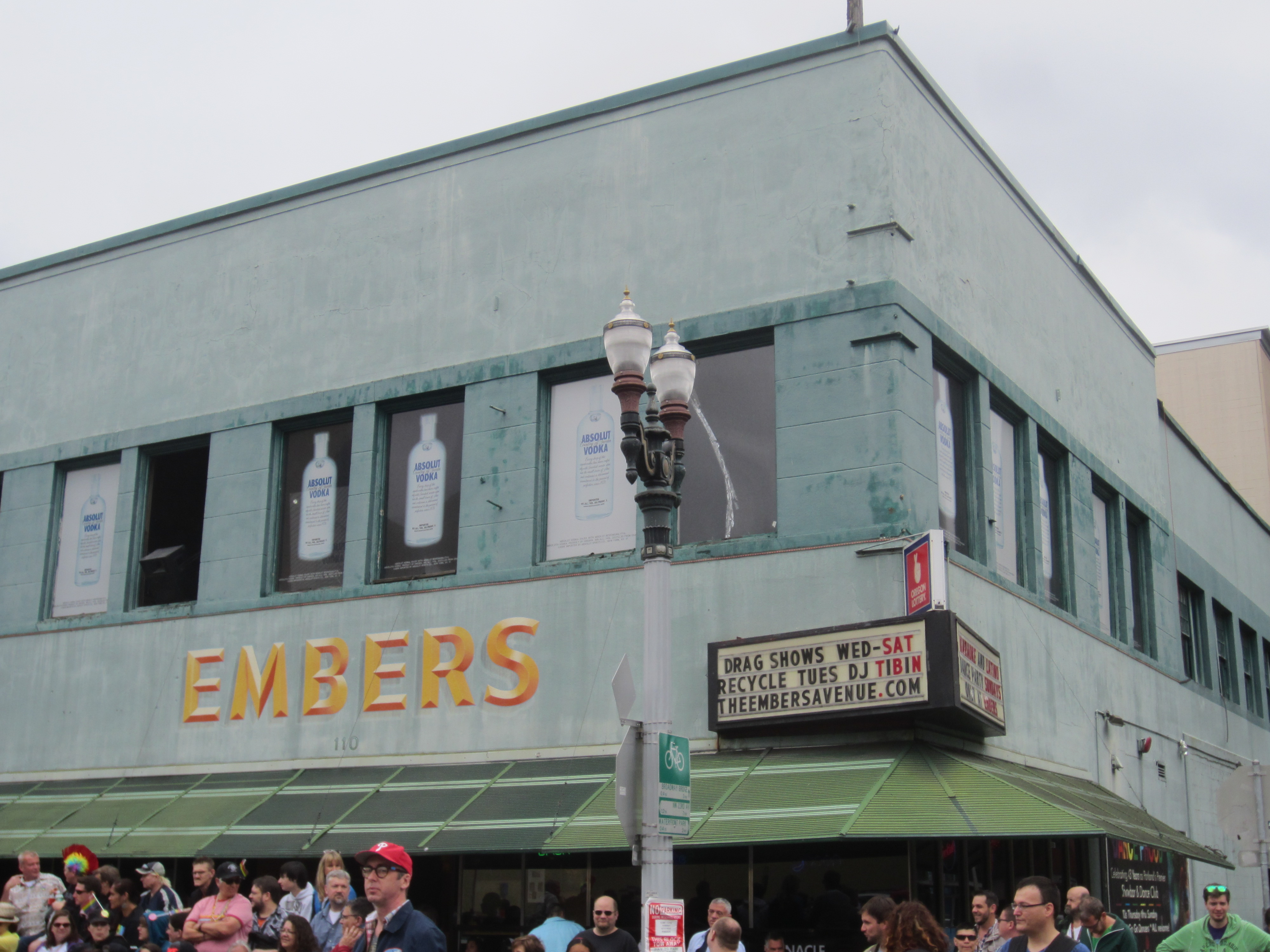
- The club's exterior in 2014

- Location in Portland, Oregon
- Location: Portland, Oregon, United States
- Coordinates: 45.52398°N 122.67725°W
- Type: Gay bar; nightclub

Construction
- Opened: 1969
- Closed: 2017

The Embers Avenue, also known as Embers, was a gay bar and nightclub located at the outer edge of the Old Town Chinatown neighborhood of Portland, featuring drag shows, karaoke, and live music. The club opened in 1969 and closed in late 2017. The Oregonian reported in late November 2017 that the building owner intended to fill the space with a similar venue, and in 2024, Badlands Portland opened in the space.

== History ==
Embers Avenue opened in 1969. The club was originally located at SW Park and Morrison, next to the Virginia Cafe. In 1979, it moved to the corner of NW Broadway and Couch Street, where it would remain until its closure.

In the late 1980s and early 1990s, Embers was an important social space for the LGBTQ community, which was badly impacted by the HIV/AIDS crisis. It was an important venue for drag performers in the city. Events included weekly goth nights, Notable performers included Bolivia Carmichaels and Poison Waters.

It closed suddenly on December 1, 2017, after the owner, Steve Suss, suffered a series of strokes and could no longer run the business. Suss died in 2020.

== Reception ==
Donald Olson, writing for Frommer's, rated the venue as two out of three stars. He described the club as a primarily gay disco also appealing to straight people, with "lots of flashing lights and sweaty bodies until the early morning".

== See also ==
- Culture of Portland, Oregon
- List of LGBTQ bars
