= Poison Waters =

American drag performer (born 1967 or 1968)

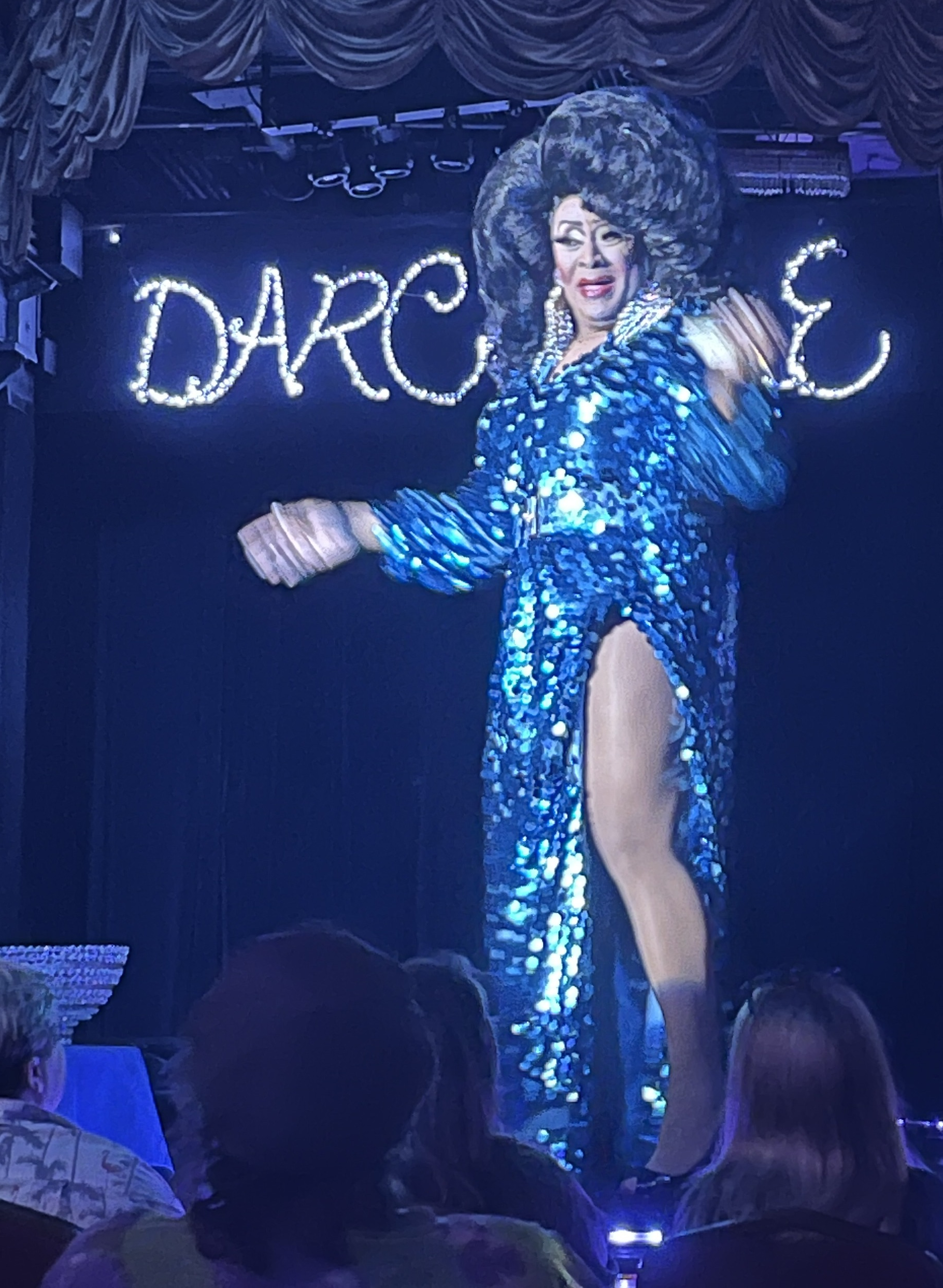
- Poison Waters in 2022
- Born: Kevin Cook; 1967 or 1968 (age 57–58); Santa Monica, California, U.S.
- Education: Mt. Hood Community College
- Occupation: Drag performer
- Years active: 1980s–present
- Website: poisonwaters.com

Kevin Cook, known by the stage name Poison Waters, is an American drag performer. Since the 1980s, Poison Waters has been an emcee, entertainer, and community activist. She is a longtime hostess at Darcelle XV Showplace and has participated in fundraisers, LGBTQ events, public service announcements, and other community activities throughout the Pacific Northwest. Cook has also taught at Portland Community College.

== Early life and education ==
Cook was born in Santa Monica, California. His father was Black and his mother was of Mexican and Native American descent.

Cook moved from Southern California to Portland, Oregon in 1979 at the age of 11. He was raised in poverty in northeast Portland's Parkrose neighborhood, where he attended Parkrose High School.

Cook first encountered the city's drag scene after graduating, and also discovered he was gay at the age of 18. A performance by a group of four Black drag queens from Darcelle XV Showplace and Embers Avenue led him to recognize that drag was something available to people of color, and he was mentored by his "drag mother" Rosie Waters. Cook named his drag persona Poison Waters after Rosie Waters and Dior's perfume Poison, which he discovered while working at the Lloyd Center.

Cook later attended Mt. Hood Community College.

== Career ==
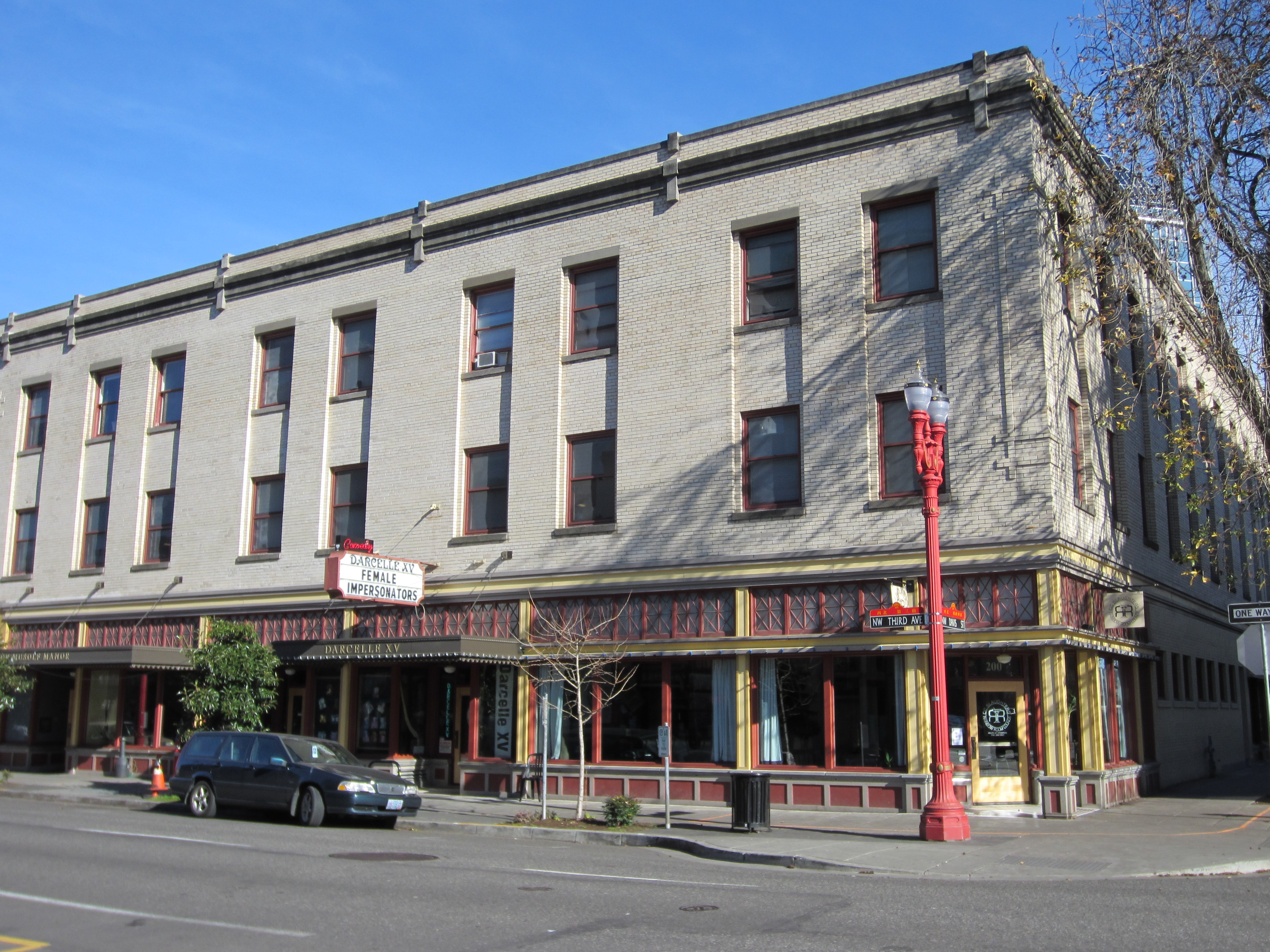
Poison Waters has performed at Darcelle XV Showplace (pictured) since the 1990s.

Poison Waters has been a drag performer, emcee, and community activist since 1988. She is a hostess at Portland's Darcelle XV Showplace and worked with Darcelle XV at the drag venue since the early 1990s. She has also performed in drag shows and gay pride events in Beaverton, Bend, Hillsboro, and Salem.

Poison Waters has modeled in drag pageants and was crowned as Empress of Portland's Imperial Sovereign Rose Court in 2001. On stage, she was part of the cast of Darcelle Showplace XV's musical Pageant in 2017, and she played Mother Ginger in Oregon Ballet Theatre's production of George Balanchine's The Nutcracker. She has emceed events, such as the trade show Sexapalooza in Portland in 2012, and hosted drag brunch at Darcelle Showplace XV and Stag PDX. She has also read books about diversity and inclusivity to children at libraries, including Multnomah County Library's "Drag Queen Storytimes" series in 2018. In 2019, she and other drag artists performed at Smith Memorial Student Union to commemorate the 50th anniversary of the Stonewall riots; the event was organized by Portland State University and Portland Community College. She performed at a Juneteenth block party in 2020.

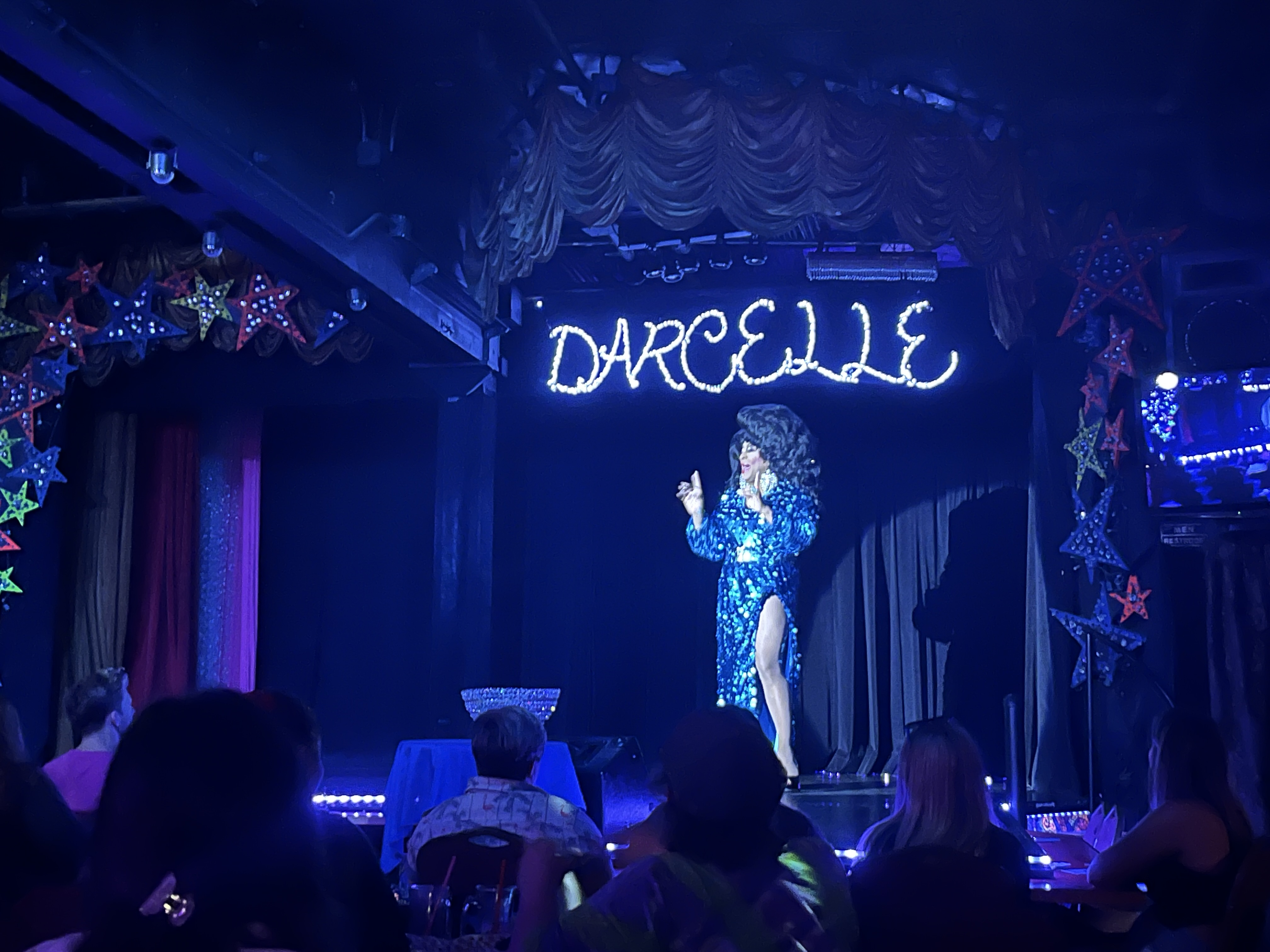
Poison Waters performing at Darcelle XV Showplace in 2022

Poison Waters has supported many organizations, including the American Civil Liberties Union, CAP Northwest (formerly Cascade AIDS Project), and Habitat for Humanity. She has volunteered with Cascade AIDS Project since 1988 and served on the organization's board of directors twice. Additionally, Poison Waters has worked with Women's Intercommunity AIDS Resource and Camp KC (Kids Connection) to help families affected by HIV/AIDS. She has also participated in fundraisers for the youth empowerment organization Girls, Inc. and the Leukemia & Lymphoma Society.

In 2020, during the COVID-19 pandemic, Poison Waters was a host for Vashon, Washington's online pride festivities. She was also recruited to be Oregon's "drag ambassador" by Drag Out the Vote, a nonpartisan national organization "aiming to educate, register, and turn out voters, while maximizing fun and some glorious looks in the process". In 2021, Poison Waters encouraged people to wear face masks on public transportation as part of TriMet's public service campaign. She also hosted a youth fashion show fundraiser in Portland, in which she modeled upcycled new designs with other local drag performers. During the city's annual Pride Festival, which was mostly held online because of the pandemic, Poison Waters provided entertainment as part of a film screening benefitting LGBTQ veterans. Additionally, she performed at a socially distanced outdoor entertainment venue at Zidell Yards. In Hillsboro, she appeared at an outdoor pride concert as well as "Pride Storytime" for children at a local community center. She also hosted drag bingo, fundraisers, and corporate events via Zoom.

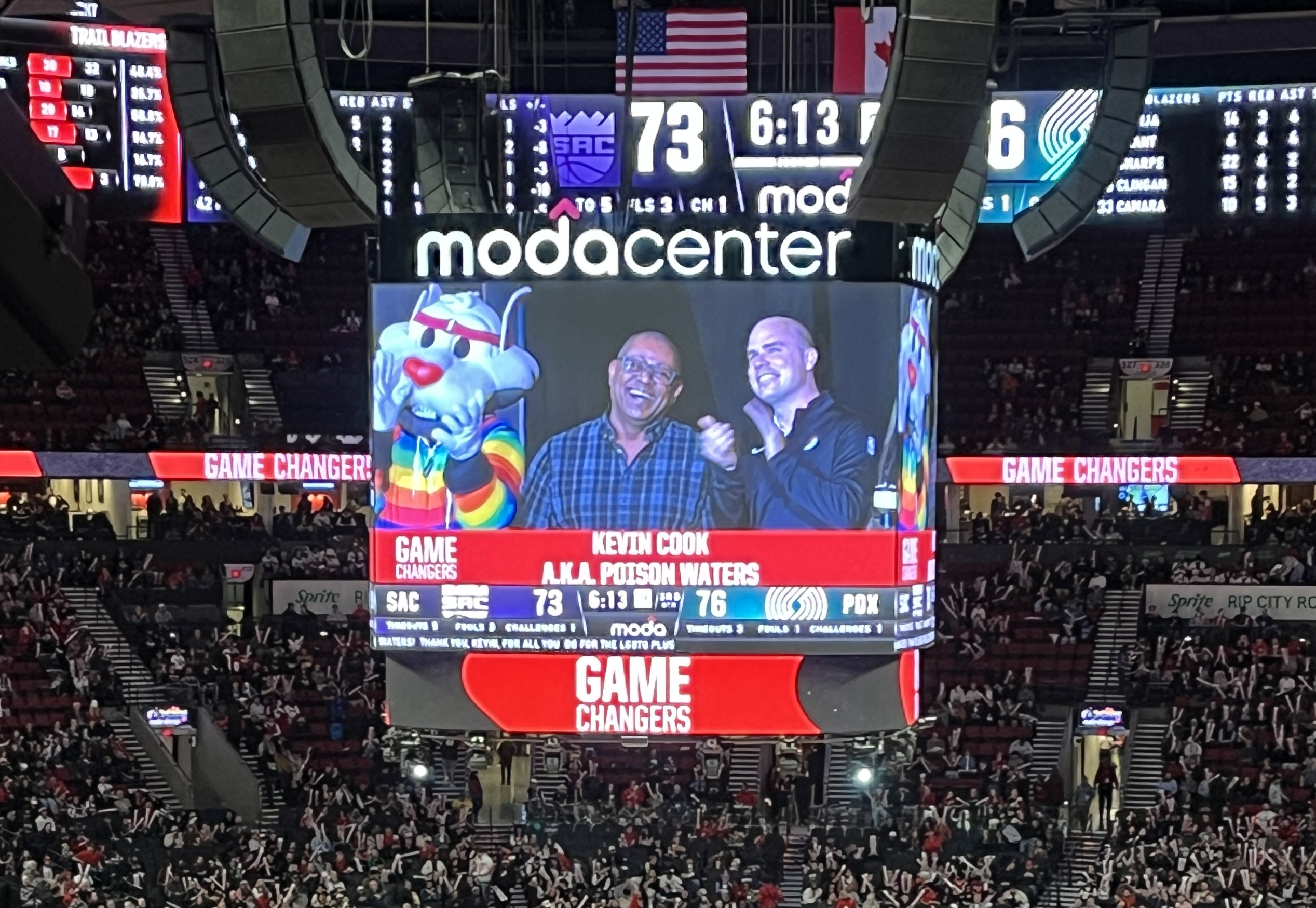
Poison Waters being honored at a Portland Trail Blazers game designated "Pride Night", Moda Center, December 2025

Poison Waters writes a weekly column for the digital LGBTQ publication Shoutout, featuring local drag artists, as of 2021. In 2021, Cook taught a course at Portland Community College called "Histories of Drag Performance in Portland". The University of Portland's Gender and Sexuality Partnership hosted the show "Poison Waters and friends" in 2022. She emceed the inaugural Pride Lake Oswego at Millennium Plaza Park in 2024 and the subsequent event in 2025.

== Recognition ==
Poison Waters has been described as "iconic", and in 2021, Portland Monthly writers called her "a shining jewel in our city". According to the Oregon Queer History Collective, which named her a "queer hero" in 2013, Poison Waters has also been recognized by CAP Northwest, the Coalition for AIDS, the Imperial Sovereign Rose Court, the Oregon Bears, and Pride Northwest for her "steadfast work within the HIV/AIDS community". In 2025, she received an honorary degree from Portland State University and won the Best Drag Queen category of Willamette Week's annual 'Best of Portland' readers' poll.

== See also ==
- LGBTQ culture in Portland, Oregon
- List of African-American LGBTQ people
- List of drag queens
- List of LGBTQ people from Portland, Oregon
- List of people from Santa Monica, California
