= Badlands Portland =

Gay bar in Portland, Oregon, U.S.

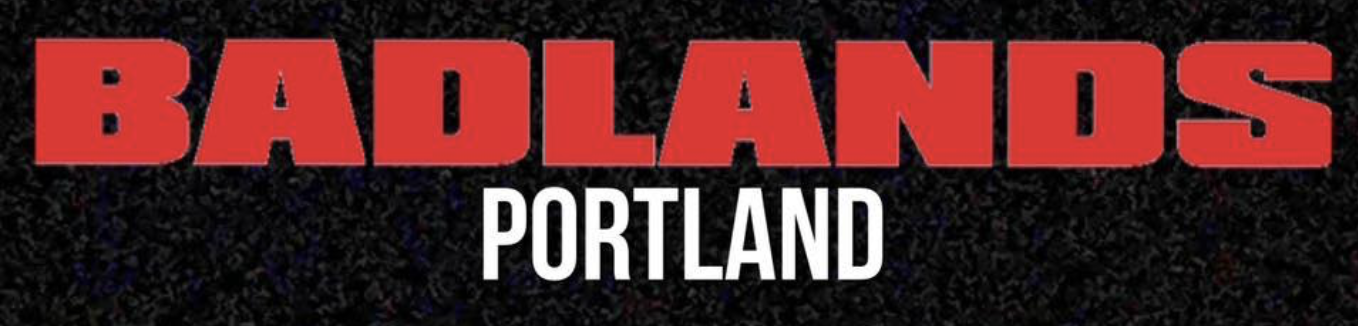

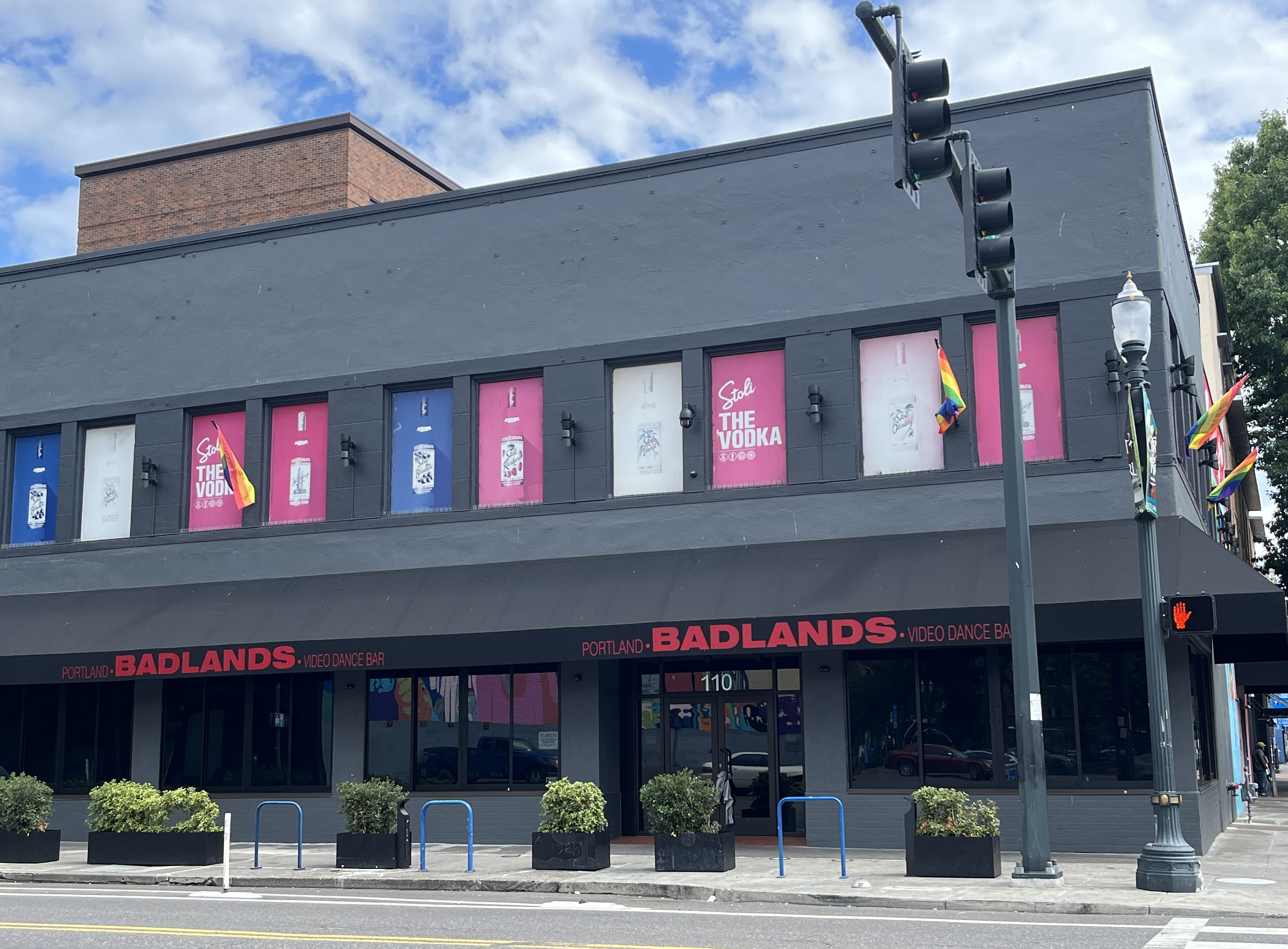
- The bar's exterior, 2025
- Interactive map of Badlands Portland
- Address: 110 Northwest Broadway; Portland, Oregon; United States
- Coordinates: 45.5239°N 122.6773°W
- Owner: TJ Bruce

Construction
- Opened: June 12, 2024

Badlands Portland, or simply Badlands, is a gay bar in Portland, Oregon, United States. Established in 2024, the bar operates in the space that previously occupied Embers Avenue (1969–2017), in the northwest Portland part of the Old Town Chinatown.

== Description ==
The gay bar Badlands Portland operates at the intersection of Broadway and Couch in the northwest Portland part of Old Town Chinatown. The LGBTQ-owned business hosts disc jockeys and has approximately 40 screens that play music videos. Badlands also hosts a variety of events such as dance parties, drag bingo and shows, karaoke, pool tournaments, trivia, and viewing parties for television shows.

== History ==
Badlands Portland occupies the space formerly held by Embers Avenue, a renowned LGBTQ+ nightclub that operated from 1969 until its closure in 2017. In January 2018, owner TJ Bruce acquired the building, initiating extensive renovations to modernize the venue while preserving its historical essence. Badlands opened on June 12, 2024, during Pride Month. The bar is part of the chain Splash, which is based in California.

== See also ==
- List of LGBTQ bars
