= List of LGBTQ people from Portland, Oregon =

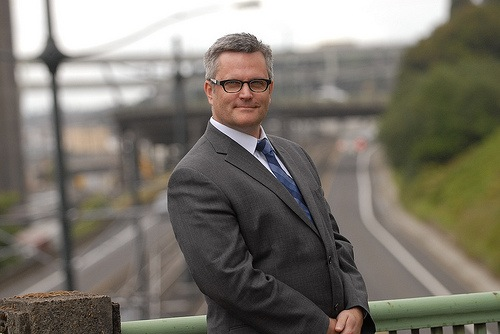
Sam Adams

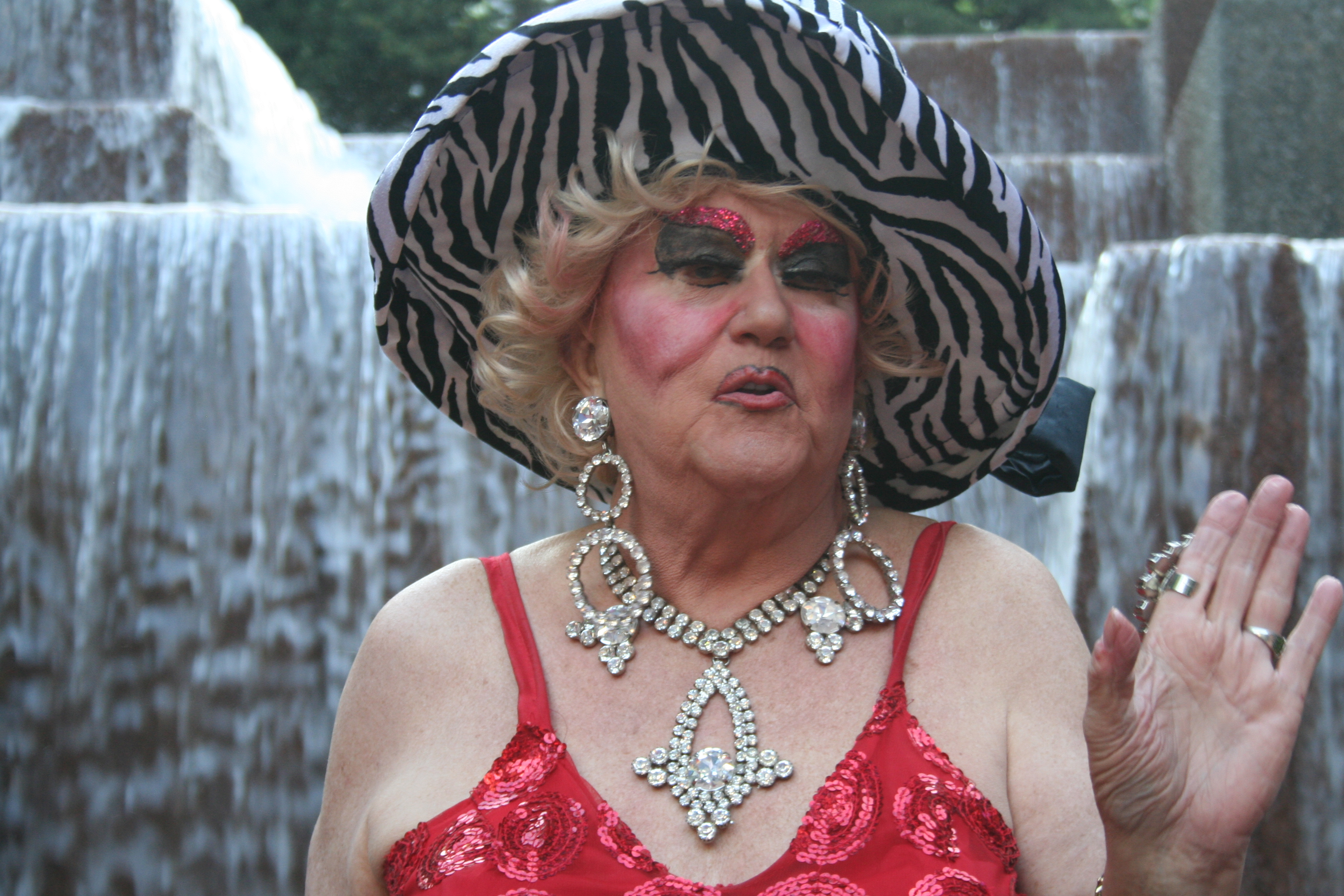
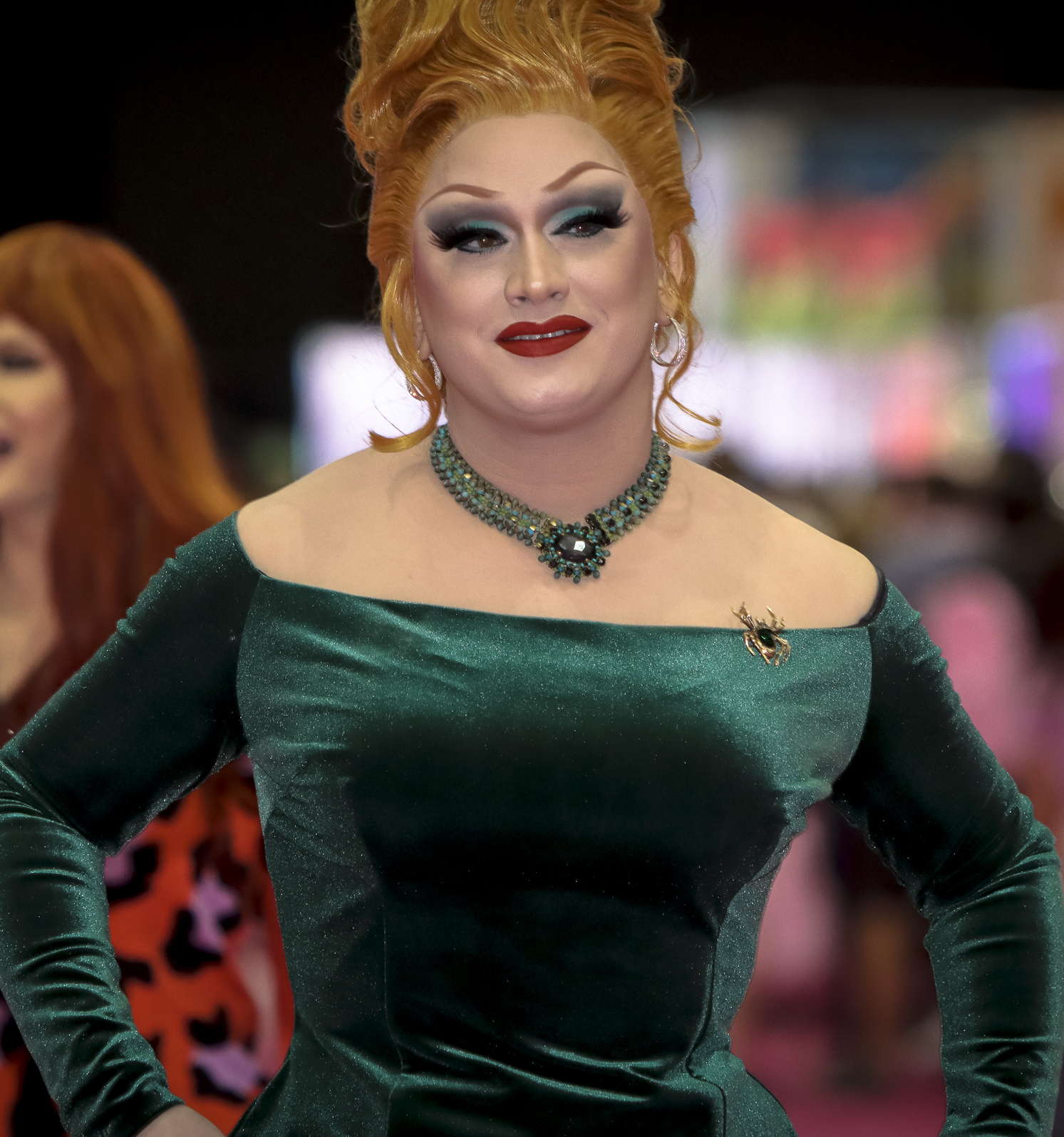
Drag performers Darcelle XV (left, 2012) and Jinkx Monsoon (right, 2022)

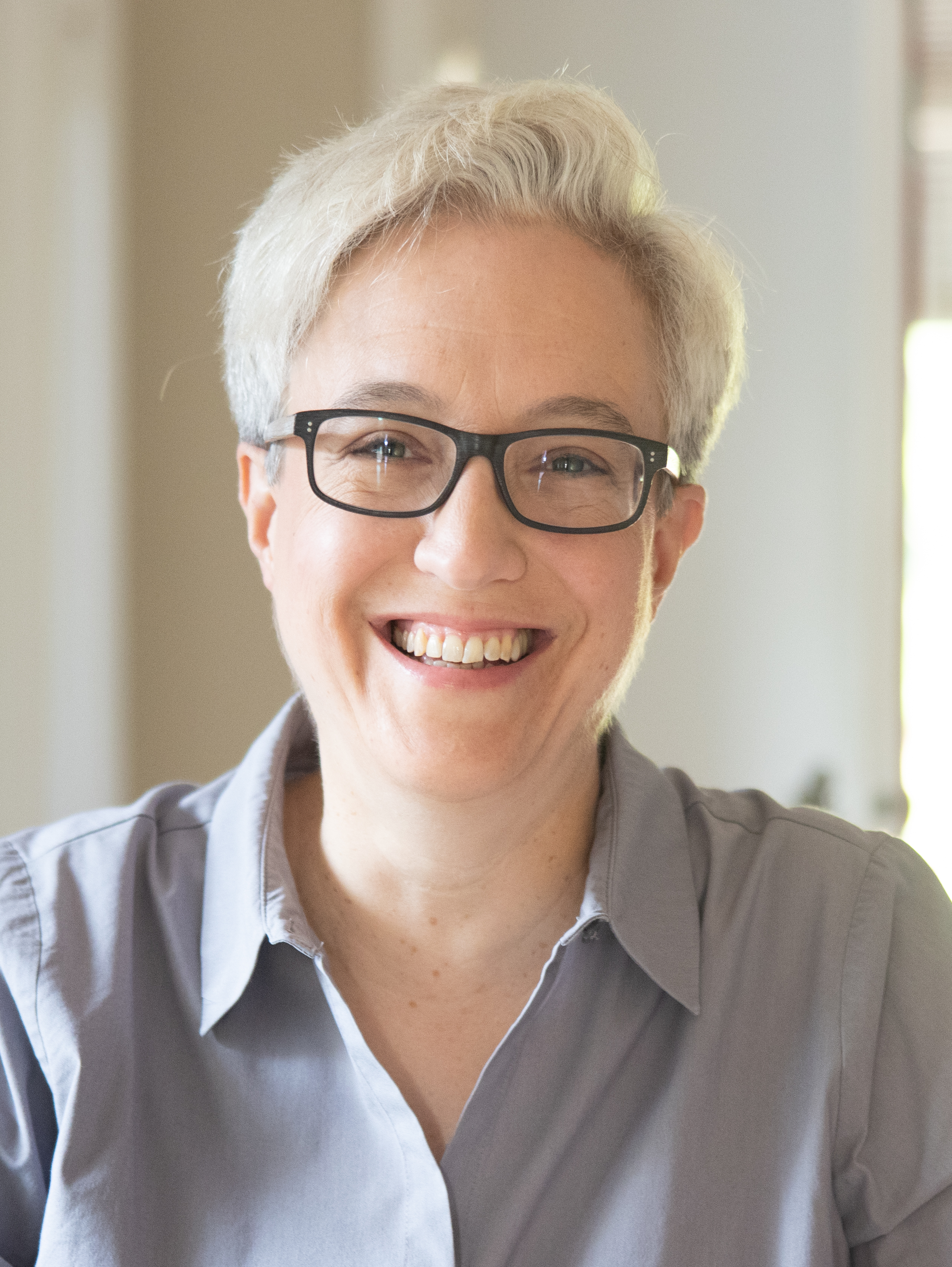
Tina Kotek

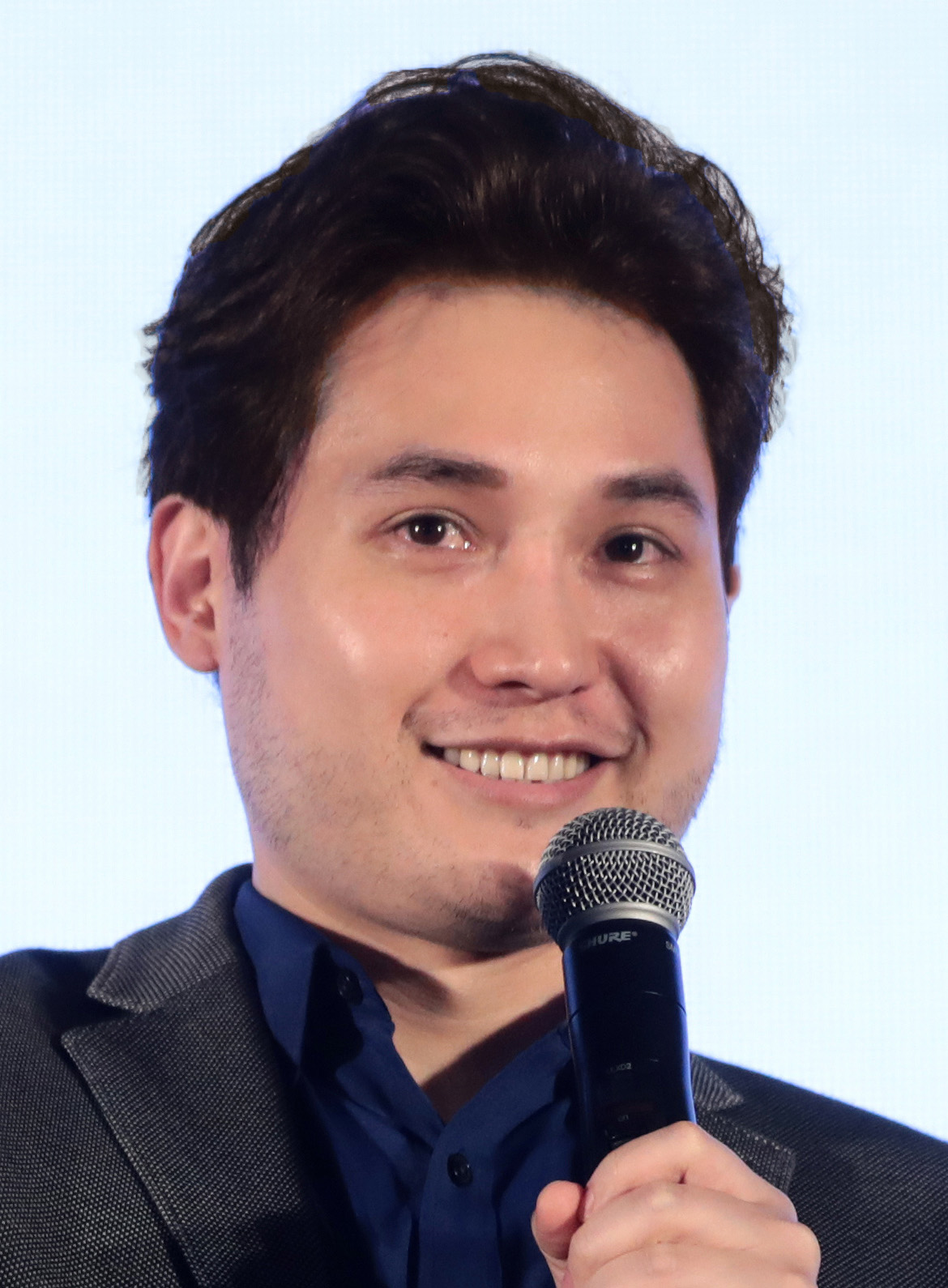
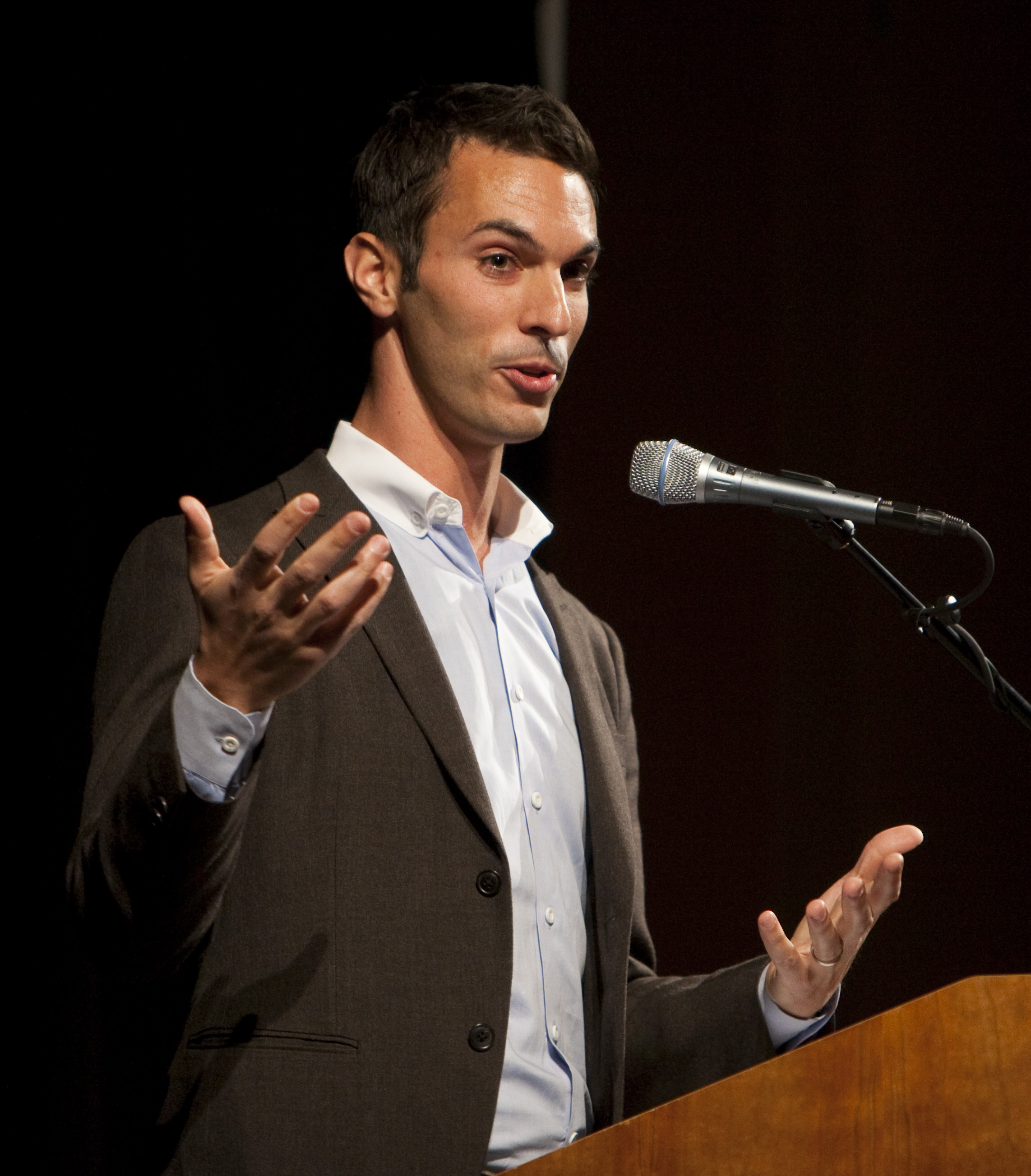
Journalists Andy Ngo (left, 2019) and Ari Shapiro (right, 2012)

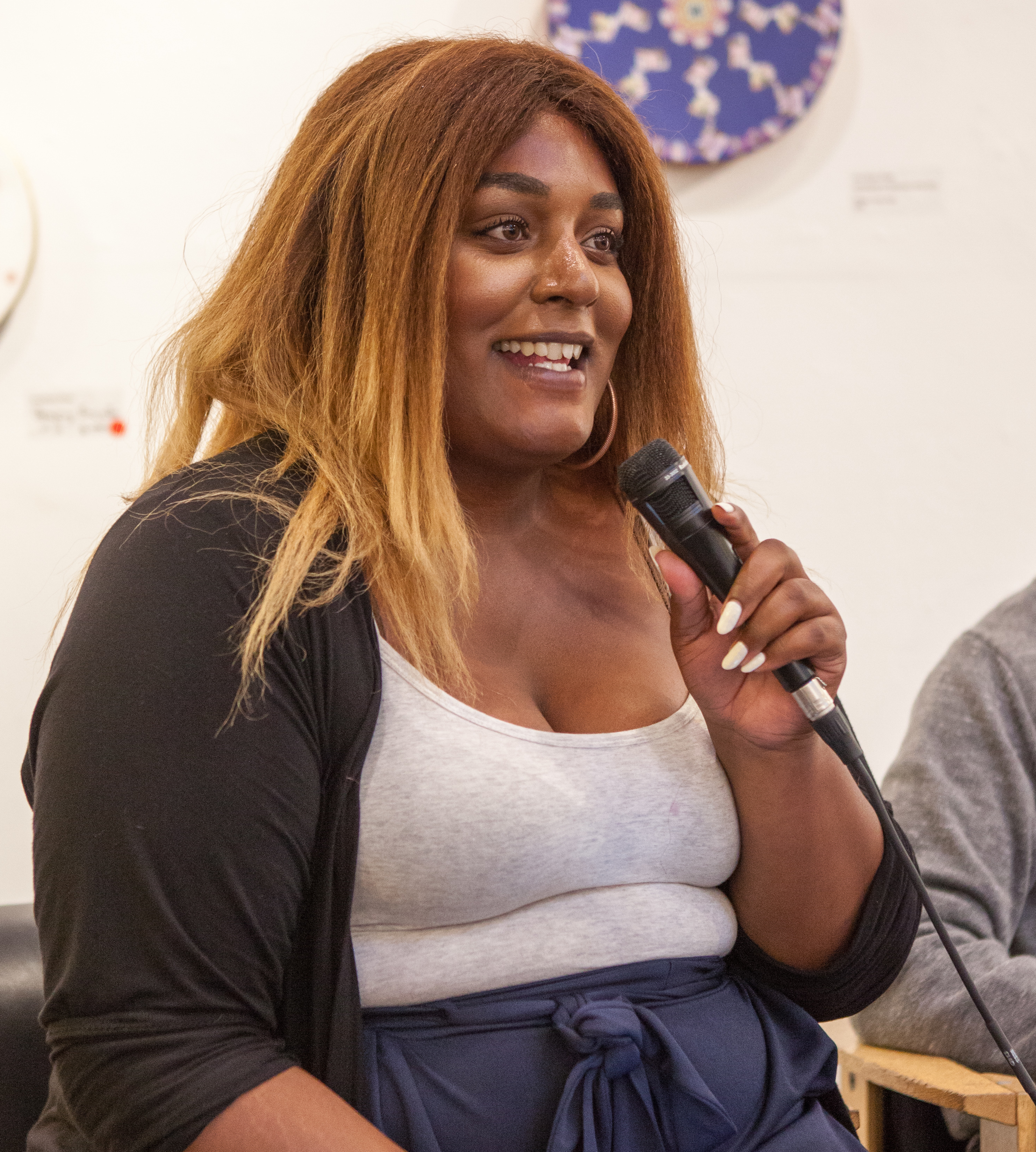
Aria Sa'id in 2017

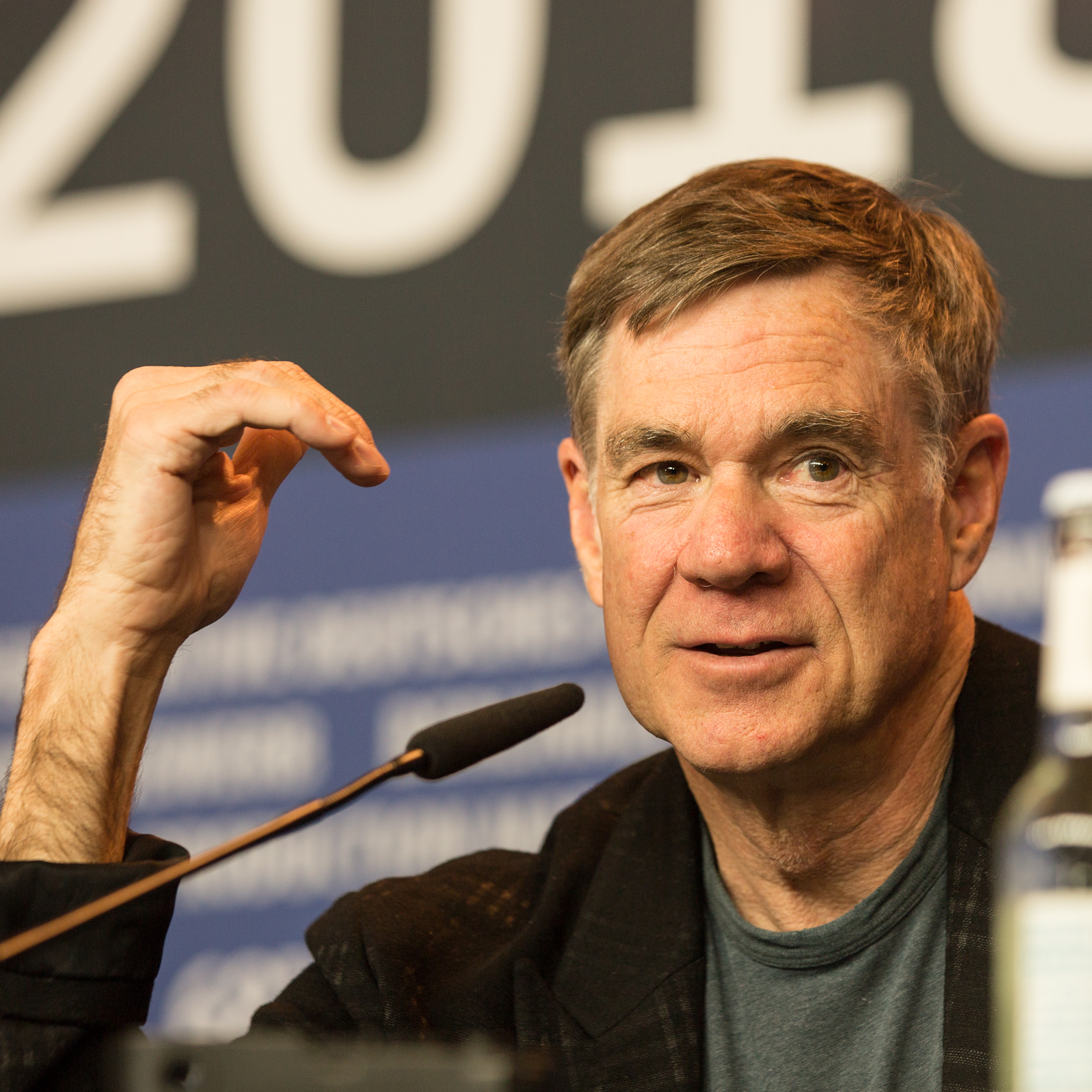
Gus Van Sant

Portland, Oregon has a large LGBTQ community for its size. Notable LGBTQ people from the city include:

- Sam Adams – first openly gay mayor of a large U.S. city
- Matt Alber – singer-songwriter
- Asia Consent – drag performer
- Terry Bean – gay rights activist and political fundraiser
- James Beard – chef and cookbook author
- Byron Beck – journalist
- Brett Bigham – educator
- Jody Bleyle – musician
- Bolivia Carmichaels – drag performer
- Kate Brown – 38th governor of Oregon
- Carrie Brownstein – actress, musician
- Darcelle XV – drag queen
- Darren G. Davis – comic book publisher and writer
- Beth Ditto – singer-songwriter and actress
- Sarah Dougher – musician
- saoirse dream - musician
- Donna Dresch – musician
- Marie Equi – medical doctor, family planning advocate
- Flawless Shade – drag queen and makeup artist
- Gregory Gourdet – chef
- Dacia Grayber — Oregon state representative
- Laci Green – YouTuber
- Lou Harrison – composer
- Alan L. Hart – physician; one of the first trans men to undergo hysterectomy and gonadectomy in the U.S.
- Todd Haynes – film director
- Isaiah Esquire – burlesque and drag performer
- MJ Kaufman – playwright
- Rupert Kinnard – cartoonist
- Rives Kistler – first and, then, only openly LGBT state supreme court justice in the U.S.
- Tina Kotek – 39th governor of Oregon
- Storm Large – singer
- Thomas Lauderdale – musician
- Lulu Luscious – drag queen
- Mars – drag queen
- Michael J. McShane – United States district judge of the United States District Court for the District of Oregon
- Jonte' Moaning – choreographer and dancer
- Jinkx Monsoon – drag queen
- Angelita Morillo – member of Portland City Council
- Lynn Nakamoto – Oregon Supreme Court judge
- Mary Nolan — member of Metro Council
- Rob Nosse — Oregon state representative
- Nicole Onoscopi – drag queen
- Andy Ngo – journalist
- Chuck Palahniuk – author
- John Paulk – former gay reparative therapy advocate
- Elana Pirtle-Guiney – member of Portland City Council
- Poison Waters – drag performer
- Johnnie Ray – singer, songwriter, musician
- Dan Ryan — member of Portland City Council
- Aria Sa'id
- Dale Scott
- Ari Shapiro – journalist
- Gail Shibley – first openly gay person to serve in the Oregon State Legislature
- Tammy Stoner – writer, artist
- Corin Tucker – musician
- Gus Van Sant – filmmaker
- Holcombe Waller
- Minor White – photographer
- Cameron Whitten – activist
- Kaia Wilson – musician
- Martin Wong – artist
- Lidia Yuknavitch – writer
- Eric Zimmerman — member of Portland City Council
- Peter Zuckerman – journalist
