= List of public art in Lake Oswego, Oregon =

List of public artworks in Lake Oswego, Oregon, U.S.

This is a list of public art in Lake Oswego, Oregon.

== Sculpture ==
- Age of Iron
- Angkor I (1994), Lee Kelly
- The Awe and Wonder
- Anillos, Maria Wickwire
- Bearly About
- Blue Light Tower
- Bread Upon the Water
- Dream
- The Family
- First Footsteps, Jim Demetro
- The Goal
- Going for Your Vision, Alisa Looney
- The Guardian
- In the Flow
- Lotus Tower
- Tidal Pool
- Crows
- Sunrise in the City
- Pinecone Ballards
- Ram's Head Benches
- Spirit of the Marsh
- Stafford Stones
- Sunbathers, Ken Patecky
- Sunflower
- Swoop II
- Time and Space
- Untitled, Bruce West
- Various Works
- Water, Water, Water
- The Way it Is
- Zephyr

=== Gallery Without Walls ===
- Adam, Let's Go for a Bite, Ed Humphries
- August Trunk, Alisa Formway Roe
- Mariposa, Laurel Marie Hagner
- Pouffe, Hilary Pfeifer
- Sprout, Mike Suri
- The Big Maybe, Stashu Smaka
