= Parallel Parking Competition =

Annual event in Portland, Oregon, U.S.

- Status: Active
- Frequency: Annually
- Locations: Portland, Oregon, U.S.
- Inaugurated: 2025
- Founders: Daniel Lyman; Stefanie Lynch

The Parallel Parking Competition is an annual event in Portland, Oregon, United States. Established by friends Daniel Lyman and Stefanie Lynch in 2025, the inaugural parallel parking competition was held outside Lyman's house in the southeast Portland part of the Kerns neighborhood. Approximately 40–100 people attended. The competition was planned within a few days. It received national media attention, including coverage on Good Morning America.

Approximately 94 people using 80 vehicles competed in the second annual event in 2026, which drew approximately 200 spectators. Competitors parked between Lyman's and Lynch's vehicles, which had pool noodles attached to the bumpers. Judges and commentators for the 2026 event include drag performer Nicole Onoscopi, KOIN meteorologist Josh Cozart, and a parking enforcement officer for the Portland Bureau of Transportation (PBOT). Prizes included PBOT-sponsored parking passes. Consolation prizes such as facial masks and Las Vegas keychains were also distributed. Entries in 2026 included a baby stroller and a motorcycle.

Oregon Public Broadcasting (OPB) and the Portland Mercury have described the event as "quirky" and "quintessentially Portland", respectively. The competition's grand prize has been described by OPB as a "gold spray-painted miniature Subaru-turned-trophy". Competitors are judged based on speed, style (or "flair"), vehicle length, and distance from the curb. Backup cameras cannot be used. The Portland competition inspired KIRO-FM radio co-hosts to make plans for a similar event in Washington.

== See also ==
- Culture of Portland, Oregon
- PDX Adult Soapbox Derby
- Transportation in Portland, Oregon
