= PDX Adult Soapbox Derby =

Annual event in Portland, Oregon, U.S.

- Logo

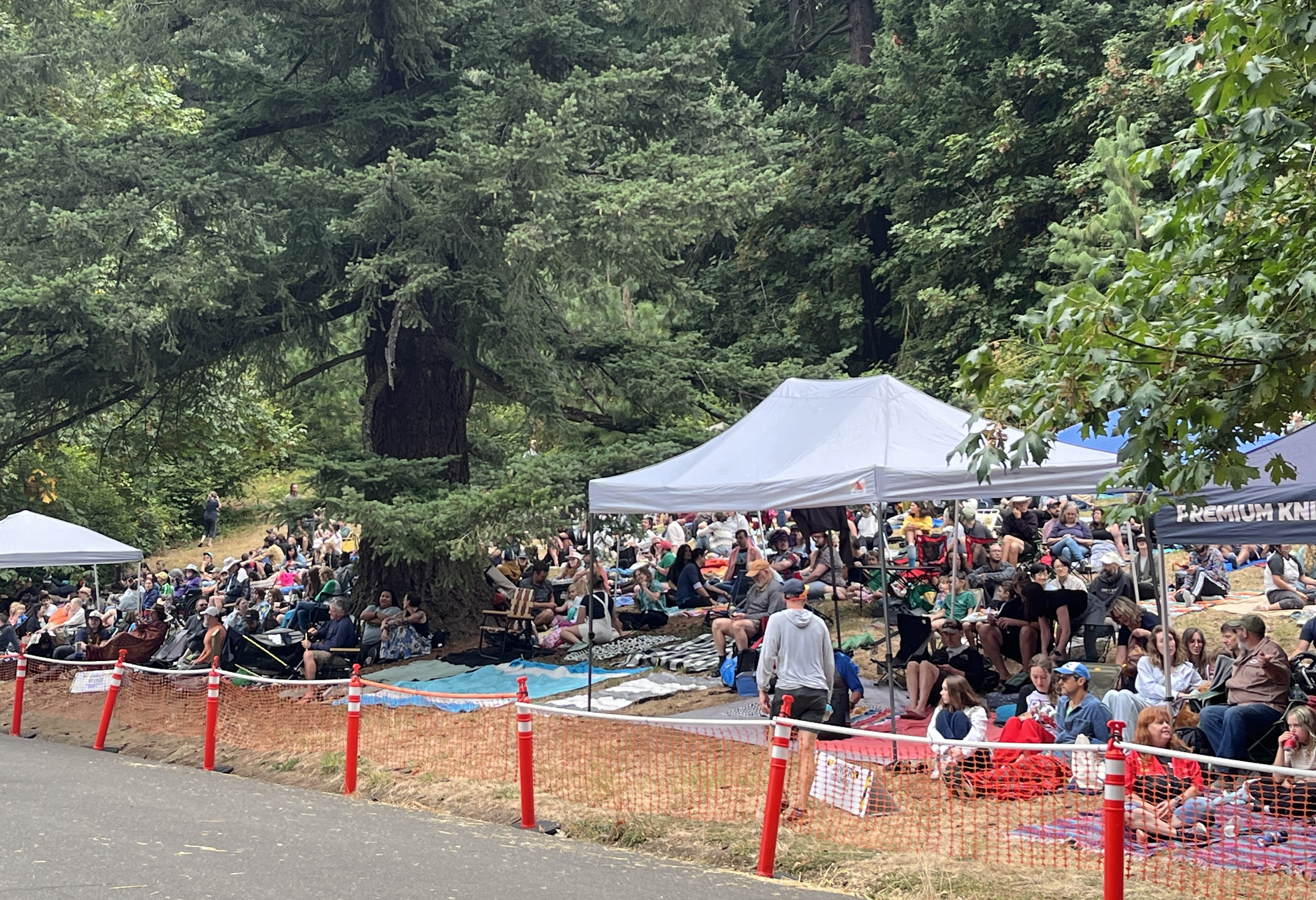
- Spectators at the 2026 event
- Status: Active
- Frequency: Annually
- Location: Portland, Oregon
- Country: United States
- Inaugurated: 1997
- Website: soapboxracer.org

The PDX Adult Soapbox Derby (or Portland Adult Soapbox Derby) is an annual gravity racer event in Portland, Oregon, United States. The tradition started in 1997. It takes place on Mount Tabor and has been described as "possibly Portland's largest DIY event". The event is attended by 7,000 to 10,000 people and has approximately 150 volunteers.

During the COVID-19 pandemic, the 2020 event was held virtually and the 2021 event was cancelled. Approximately 7,000 people attended the 2022 event. Thousands of people attended again in 2026.

Some of the vehicles reach speeds of up to 45 miles per hour.

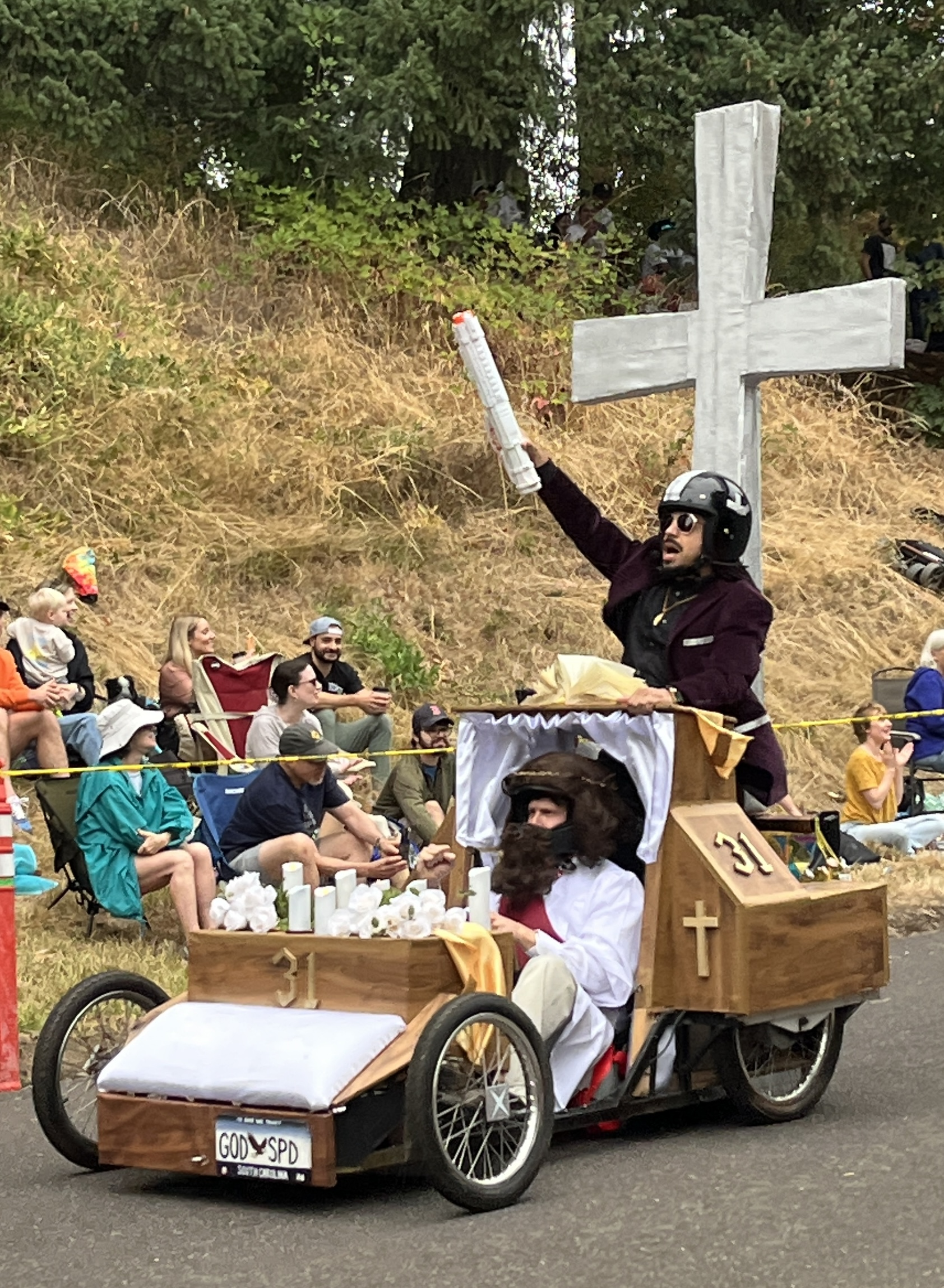
2026 entrant

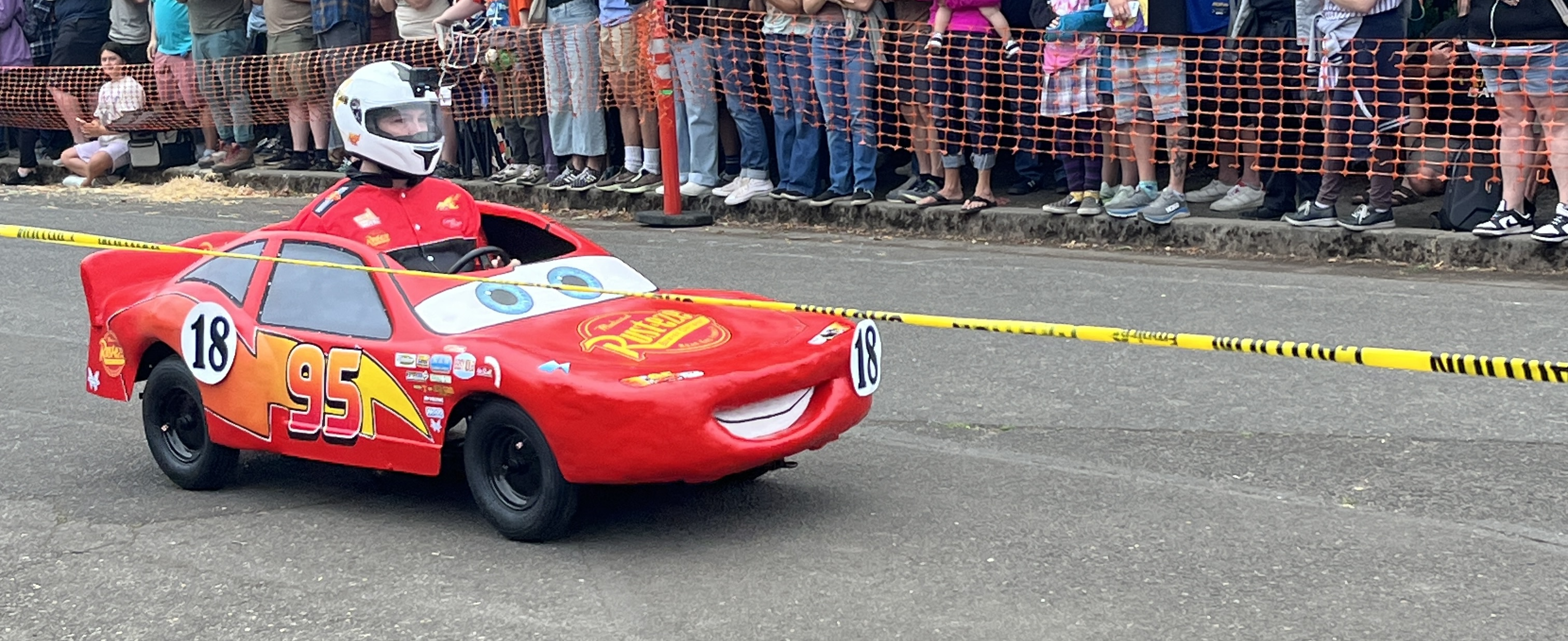
2026 entrant

== See also ==
- Culture of Portland, Oregon
- Parallel Parking Competition
