= Bolivia Carmichaels =

American drag performer

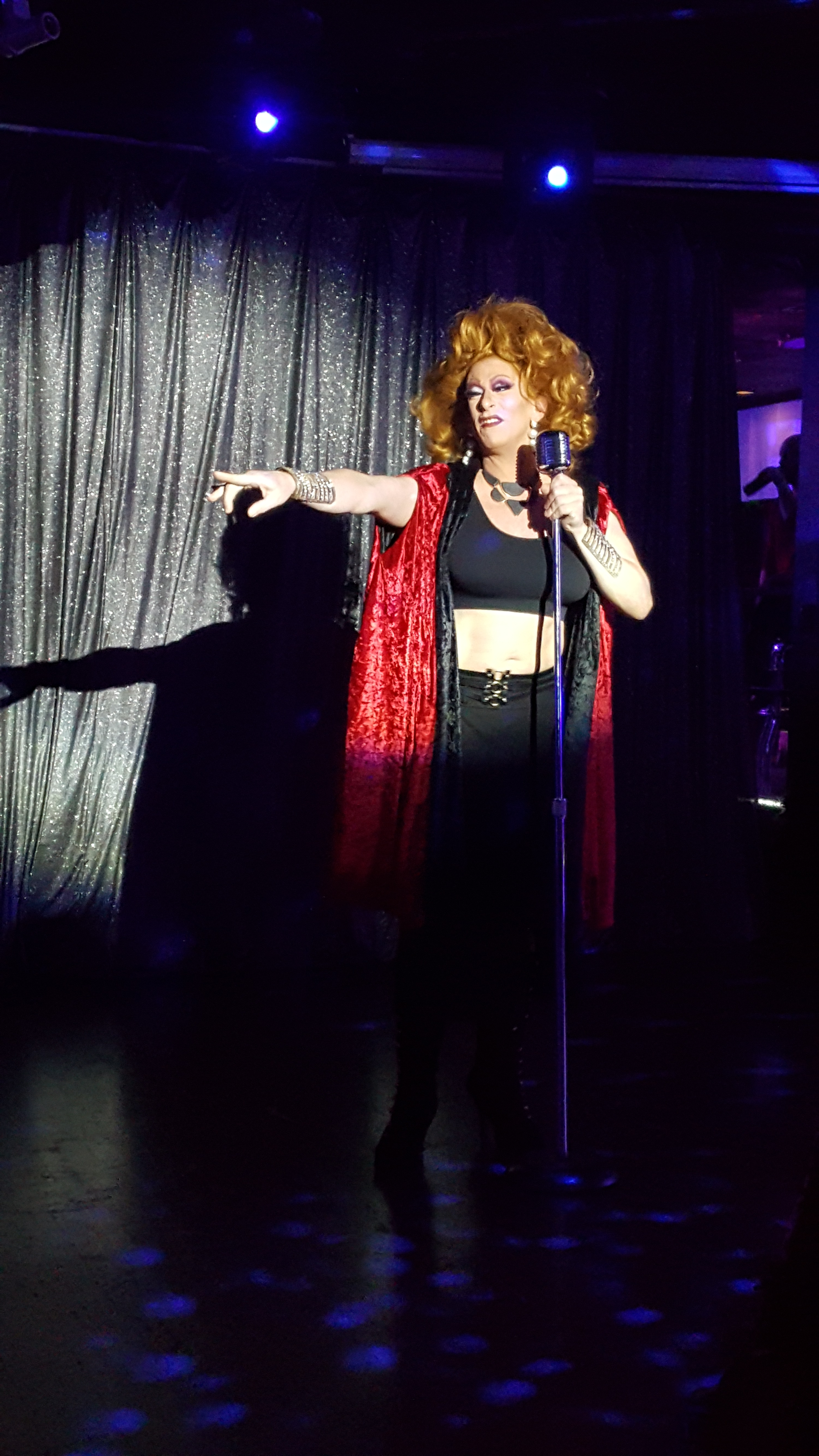
- Bolivia Carmichaels performing at CC Slaughters in Portland, Oregon, in 2021
- Born: Daniel P. Elliott
- Occupation: Drag performer
- Years active: 1995–present

Daniel P. Elliott, known professionally as Bolivia Carmichaels, is an American drag performer based in Portland, Oregon. Since 1995, she has performed at LGBTQ establishments such as CC Slaughters, Darcelle XV Showplace, and the defunct Embers Avenue, and has also participated in many community events.

== Early life ==
Daniel P. Elliott was raised in Portland, Oregon and was aware he was queer at a young age. He enjoyed theater and played the trumpet. At 18, Elliott frequented City Nightclub, described by Crystal Ligori of Oregon Public Broadcasting as a "haven" for LGBT youth in Portland during the 1980s and 1990s.

== Drag career ==
Elliott's drag persona Bolivia Carmichaels was created at City Nightclub. Since 1995, she has performed at the LGBTQ establishments CC Slaughters, Darcelle XV Showplace, and the now-closed Embers Avenue. By 2020, she had been a drag host and emcee at CC Slaughters for 16 years. She has also competed in La Femme Magnifique International Pageant, performed at the annual variety show Peacock in the Park, and hosted a radio program.

In 2016, Bolivia Carmichaels served as a judge at the Schlittentag, a Red Bull-sponsored event at Mount Hood's Skibowl in Government Camp. She also hosted the farewell celebration when Blue Collar Baking closed. She was part of Darcelle XV Showplace's cast, as of 2017. She performed at CC Slaughters' weekly Superstar Diva MegaShow and other dance events, as of 2017–2021. Andrew Jankowski of the Portland State Vanguard and Willamette Week has described the Superstar Diva MegaShow as one of the city's longest running drag shows with "self-expressive takes" on comediennes, celebrities, and Disney villains, among other figures. In 2019, he wrote, "Darcelle's is the go-to place for the most traditional style of drag: heavy makeup, classic gowns, and groan-worthy jokes from some of Portland's finest queens", including Bolivia Carmichaels, Darcelle XV, and Poison Waters.

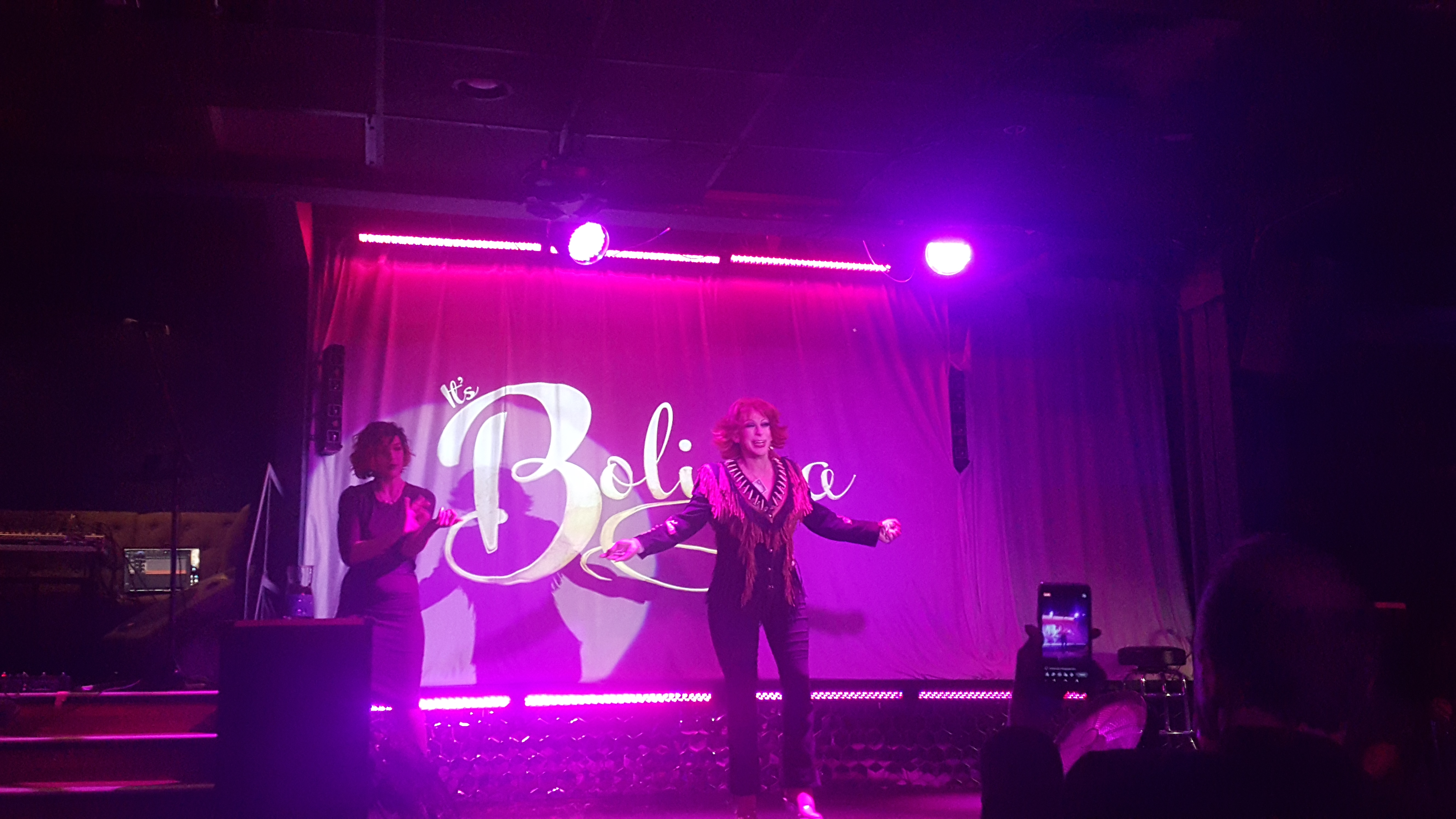
Bolivia Carmichaels at CC Slaughters in 2022

In 2019, Bolivia Carmichaels officiated a mock wedding between a man and his boyfriend fabricated from wine boxes at an event benefiting the Oregon chapter of the American Civil Liberties Union. She also performed at the Kona Pride Festival, impersonating Reba McEntire. Bolivia Carmichaels received the Imperial Sovereign Rose Court of Oregon's 2019 Spirit of Crown Prince Roc Award, which is presented to individuals who influence the community via activism and performance.

In 2020, during the COVID-19 pandemic, she performed in a virtual drag show hosted by the University of Oregon's LGBTQA3 Alliance. The Daily Emerald's Drew York wrote, "A longtime queen with a history of community outreach, Bolivia Carmichaels gave a multi-faceted performance, dressed in a velvety purple gown and lip-synching a duet to 'A Whole New World' with a puppet. Carmichaels allowed her hobby of puppeteering to take center stage, and it certainly had humorous moments." She also performed via Drag Delivered, providing socially distanced performances to benefit a local nonprofit organization, and at Shine Distillery and Grill's Drag Thru, allowing patrons to view drag performances during take-out service. The popular Drag Thru series returned in 2021, with Bolivia Carmichaels participating. She also co-hosted Oregon Children's Theatre's virtual gala in 2021.

== Personal life ==
Bolivia Carmichaels' preferred gender pronouns are she/her.

== See also ==
- LGBTQ culture in Portland, Oregon
- List of drag queens
- List of LGBTQ people from Portland, Oregon
