= Pride Lake Oswego =

Annual event in Lake Oswego, Oregon, U.S.

- Venue: Millennium Plaza Park
- Location: Lake Oswego, Oregon
- Country: United States
- Attendance: ~1,000 (2024)
- Organiser: LO for Love

Pride Lake Oswego, or Pride LO, is an annual Pride event in Lake Oswego, Oregon, United States.

== History and activities ==
The first Pride Lake Oswego was held at Millennium Plaza Park in 2024. Drag performer Poison Waters hosted an event with performances by DJ Kimere, the Portland Gay Men's Chorus and Portland Lesbian Choir, and Snubby J. Despite rainy weather, approximately 1,000 people attended.

The 2025 event at the same location was also hosted by Poison Waters and had performances by Saint Syndrome and Snubby J, as well as food vendors and booths staffed by local groups such as Lake Oswego High School, Lakeridge High School, and the Lake Oswego Public Library. The festival was organized by LO for Love in partnership with the city. Additionally, the "progress" pride flag was raised at City Hall.
