= Angkor I =

Sculpture by Lee Kelly in Lake Oswego, Oregon, U.S.

- The sculpture in April 2014
- Artist: Lee Kelly
- Year: 1994
- Medium: Stainless steel sculpture
- Dimensions: 4.3 m (14 ft)
- Weight: 1,000 lb (450 kg)
- Location: Lake Oswego, Oregon, U.S.; 45°25′04″N 122°39′53″W

Angkor I is an outdoor stainless steel sculpture by Lee Kelly, located at Millennium Plaza Park in Lake Oswego, Oregon, in the United States. The 1994 sculpture stands 14 feet (4.3 m) tall and weighs 1,000 pounds (450 kg), and was influenced by his visit to Southeast Asia one year prior.

In 2010, Angkor I appeared in an exhibition of Kelly's work at the Portland Art Museum. In 2011, it was installed at Millennium Plaza Park on loan from the Portland-based Elizabeth Leach Gallery. The Arts Council of Lake Oswego began soliciting donations in 2013 in an attempt to keep the sculpture as part of the city's permanent public art collection, Gallery Without Walls. The fundraising campaign was successful; donations from more than 40 patrons, including major contributions from the Ford Family Foundation and the Oregon Arts Commission, made purchase of the sculpture possible. Angkor I has been called a "recognizable icon" and a "gateway" to the park's lake.

== Description and history ==
Angkor I was designed by Lee Kelly, an Idaho-born Oregon sculptor whose works are influenced by modernism and abstract impressionism. Created in 1994, Angkor I is a large-scale stainless steel sculpture with a surface that is "gesturally and roughly finished". It stands 14 feet (4.3 m) tall and weighs 1,000 pounds (450 kg). In Living in Sculpture: The Studio Work of Lee Kelly, Paul Sutinen writes that Angkor I, along with Angkor II and Phi Mai, were influenced by Kelly's 1993 visit to Cambodia, Indonesia and Thailand. His visit to the temple complex Angkor Wat inspired the sculpture, as evidenced by its plaque.

In October 2010, Kelly moved the sculpture to the Portland Art Museum for his summation exhibit, which was open through January 2011. Later that year, the sculpture was installed at Millennium Plaza Park in Lake Oswego, on loan from Elizabeth Leach Gallery, the Portland-based company which represents Kelly. A board member for the Arts Council of Lake Oswego had initiated the loan proposal to Kelly and the gallery for this public display. According to Nancy Nye, executive director of the council, the sculpture is prominent in the park and "provides a gateway to the lake".

=== Permanent installation ===
In October 2013, Nye began soliciting donations for the purchase of Angkor I, which was scheduled to return to the gallery unless $55,000 could be raised by 5pm on November 1, 2013. Two weeks prior to this deadline, the council had raised $31,750, more than $20,000 short of the asking price.

In an interview published by The Oregonian, Nye said, "Lee Kelly is a living legend and the pride of Oregon's artistic community. And his studio is right here in Clackamas County. He's a local treasure." She also wrote in a press release, "It would be a terrible loss to the community to have this sculpture removed, but it's fast becoming a reality". The council's board chair, Shari Newman, also stressed the urgent need for financial assistance, saying "We're more than halfway there, but what we really need is a handful of lead donors to step forward and make this important work a permanent part of the City's collection. And we need them now." During the final two weeks of the fundraising campaign, the council draped a black parachute over the sculpture and posted signs requesting financial assistance, such as "Unless someone like you cares a whole awful lot, this sculpture is leaving... Let's hope it's not."

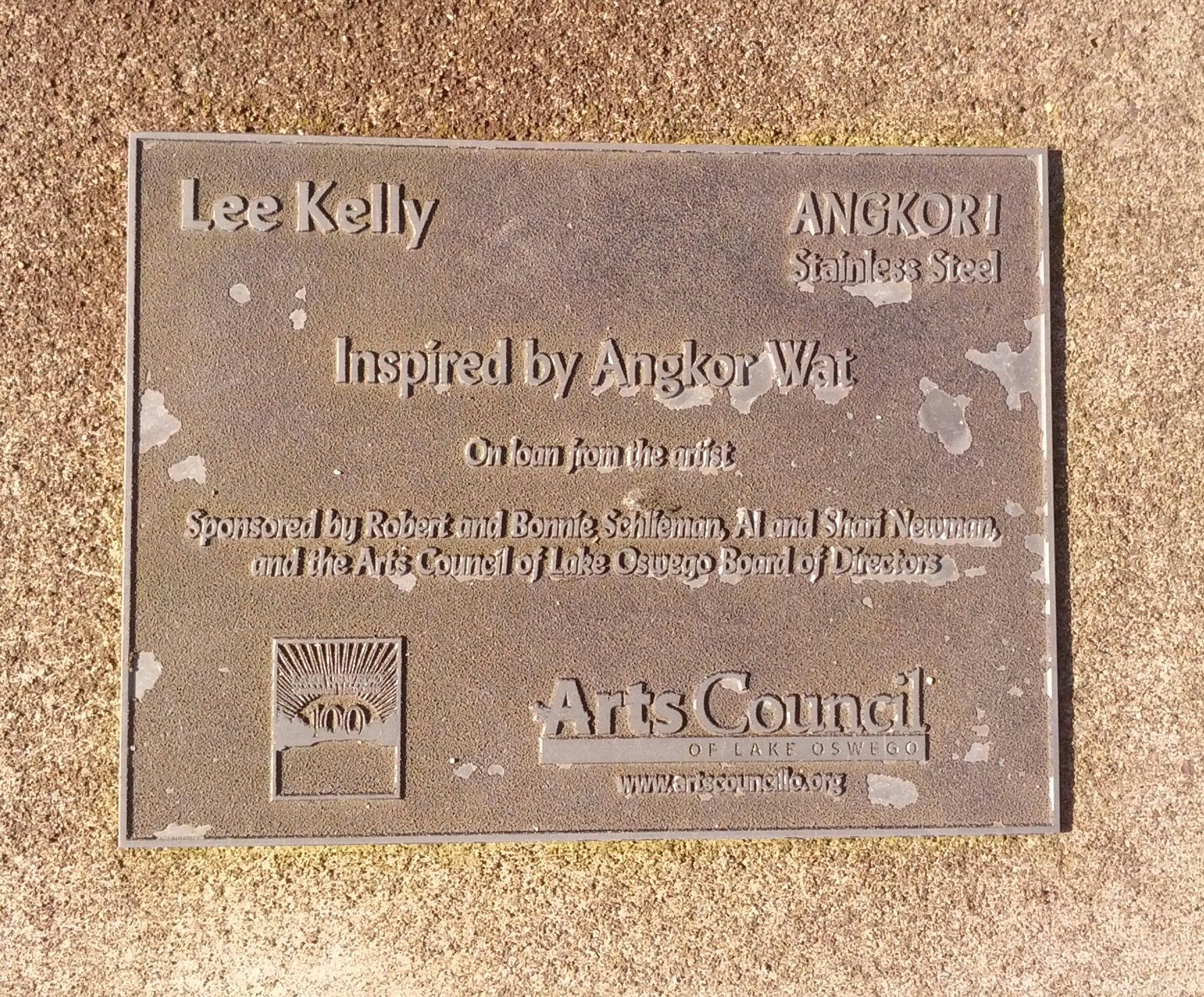
Permanent plaque, 2014

On November 1, The Oregonian reported that the council's director was certain enough money had been raised to keep Angkor I in Lake Oswego permanently, as part of its Gallery Without Walls public art program, though the exact amount of funds raised was uncertain. The Arts Council of Lake Oswego confirmed the purchase via social media on November 5. Kelly and the Elizabeth Leach Gallery each donated $5,000, and the Ford Family Foundation and the Oregon Arts Commission had awarded a $10,000 matching grant in May 2013. All funding was provided by private businesses, foundations and individuals; none came from city or state funds. Portland Tribune and The Oregonian both published comments from Nye, in which she expressed delight about the addition to Lake Oswego's public art collection and providing access to the "fine" and "magnificent" work for future generations. The council planned a commemoration ceremony at the sculpture's permanent location; expected attendees were Kelly, Mayor Kent Studebaker, and members of the Ford Family Foundation and the Oregon Arts Commission. On November 7, sister publications Lake Oswego Review and Portland Tribune published a "reader's letter" written by Nye, in which she thanked the more than 40 funders who helped purchase Angkor I.

== Reception ==
art ltd. magazine said Angkor I's "reflective surfaces, ground in sweeping gestures, are as important as its form." According to Nye, the sculpture "has become a recognizable icon". In her press release, which was published during her fundraising campaign, she wrote: "People often comment that its placement creates a gateway, or window to the lake. If Angkor I is removed, it will leave a real void in the landscape."

== See also ==
- 1994 in art
- Cambodian art
- List of public art in Lake Oswego, Oregon
- List of works by Lee Kelly
