= La Femme Magnifique International Pageant =

Annual drag pageant in Portland, Oregon, U.S.

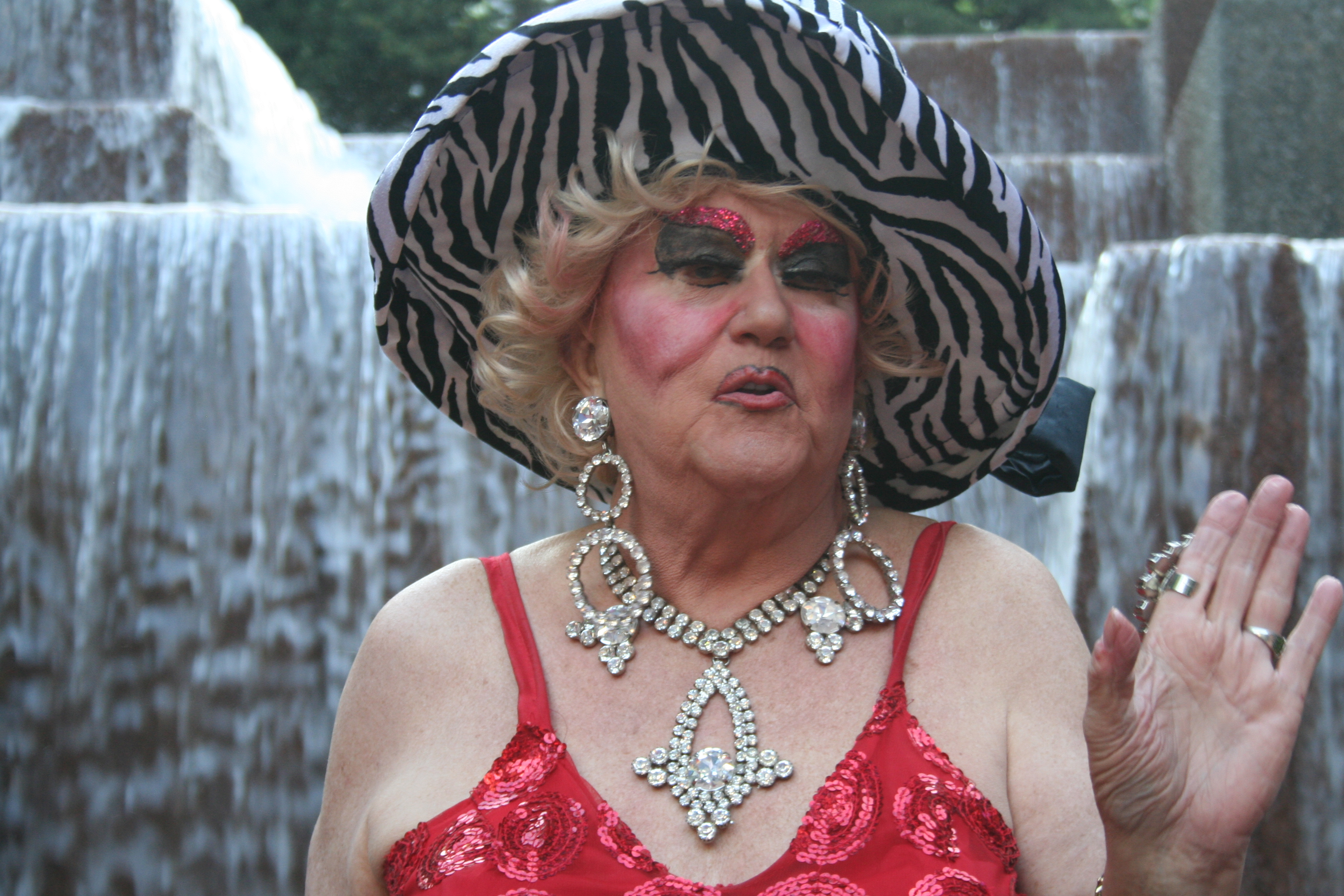
Darcelle XV, 2012

La Femme Magnifique International Pageant is an annual drag pageant. In Portland, Oregon, the event has been hosted by Darcelle XV, who has also been credited as the event's creator. OPB has said the show "celebrates different aspects of drag culture in the heart of Portland". Categories have included Black and White, evening gown, Las Vegas showgirl, and talent. In 2001, Byron Beck of Willamette Week called the event "the biggest drag show this side of the Mississippi" and said, "Expect to see a lot of old (and we're talking old) faces."

Elwood Johnson won in 1988. Gaysha Starr became Seattle's first winner in 1994. T’Kara Campbell Starr won in 2018. Tina Gee won in 2019 and held the title through 2022, since there were no contests in 2020 and 2021 because of the COVID-19 pandemic. BinKyee Bellflower won in 2022. Meesha Peru is the pageant's first Latin winner.

== See also ==
- Culture of Portland, Oregon
