= Cameron Whitten =

American community activist

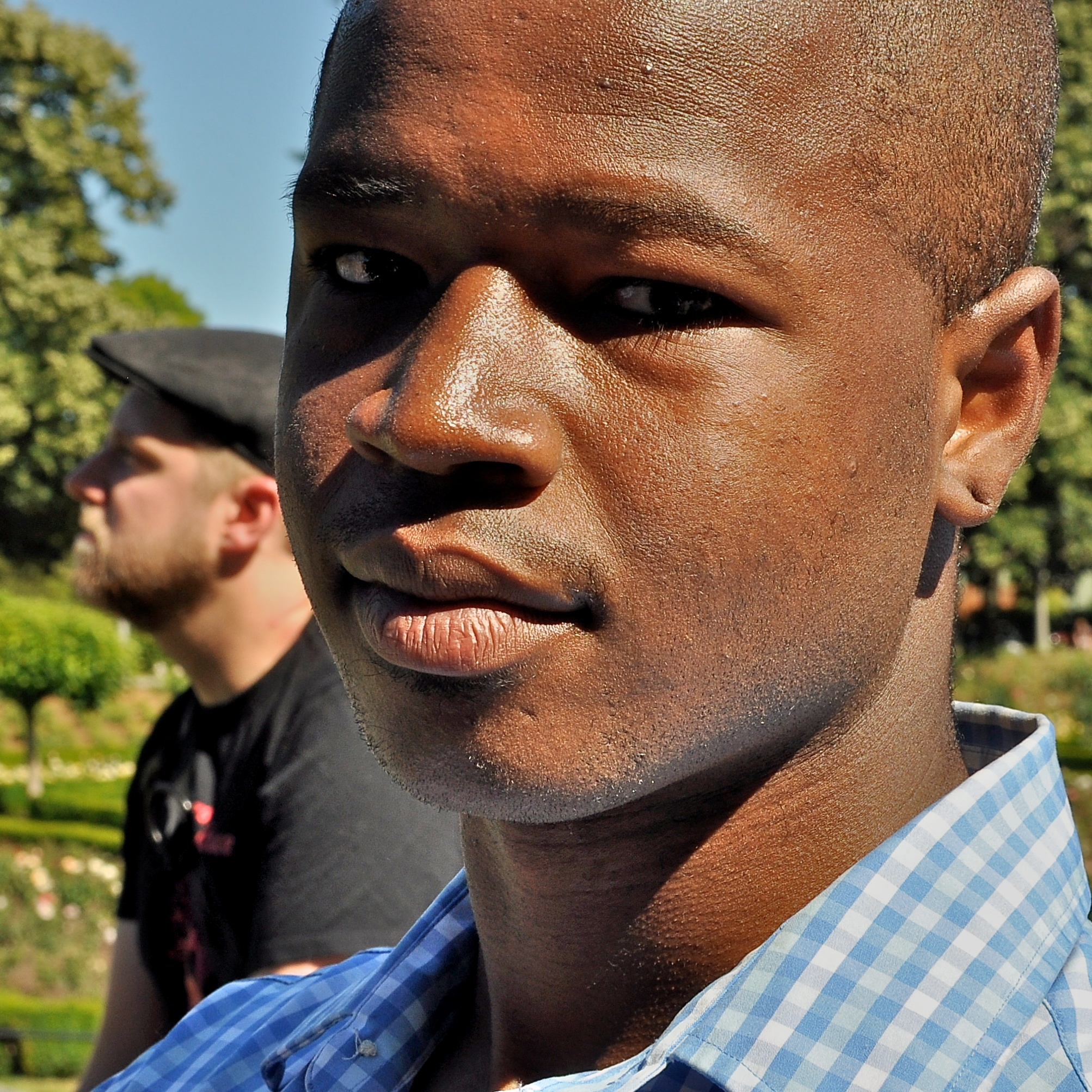
- Whitten in 2013

Personal details
- Born: April 8, 1991 (age 35) Secaucus, New Jersey, U.S.
- Occupation: Community activist

Cameron Whitten (born April 8, 1991) is an American community activist best known for advocacy on affordable housing, racial justice, and LGBT rights.

== Early life and education ==
Whitten grew up in Sterling, Virginia, outside Washington, D.C. He moved to Portland, Oregon, in 2009 and experienced homelessness at the age of eighteen. He later enrolled at Portland Community College.

== Political activism ==
A Portland resident for three years, Whitten, 20, joined the Occupy Portland movement from the start, on October 6. He camped in Lownsdale and Chapman squares for the 38 days of the occupation.

Whitten was arrested four times. He helped plan the Jamison Square occupation in October, and was arrested when police cleared it out. He was arrested during some occupiers' last stand in Chapman Square. And then he was arrested during a theatrical occupation of tiny Mill Ends Park downtown. He also has another arrest in January 2012 for actions during an Occupy the Courts rally.

Whitten got his start in politics as a candidate for mayor of Portland, Oregon, in 2012. He campaigned on a platform of diversity and inclusion. Although among the favorites in The Oregonian "most intriguing political figure" poll, Whitten was not elected mayor. He was subsequently nominated by the Oregon Progressive Party for the position of state treasurer.

== Further community involvement ==
Also in 2012, Whitten embarked on a hunger strike on the steps of City Hall to protest the housing crisis in Portland, and to demand immediate action from city leaders. The strike lasted almost two months, eliciting a statement from housing commissioner Nick Fish, and ended after concessions were made by the Portland Mayor's Office. Whitten continued to speak publicly about homelessness.

In 2013, Whitten was in the news again when he participated in the campaign for the legalization of same-sex marriage in Oregon. Also in 2013, after a homeless camp in front of Portland city hall was cleared and replaced by a burrito cart, Whitten organized a demonstration handing out free burritos which prompted the cart to relocate.

In 2014 Whitten was executive director of the organization Know Your City. In this role he conducted history-related walking tours of Portland. That year several of his articles about excessive use of force by police were published in local magazines and news outlets. He served on Portland's Transit Equity Advisory Committee. Also in 2014 Whitten joined cyclists to protest the dangerous state of Portland city infrastructure after a cyclist was killed while riding in a bike lane.

In 2015, by then a student at Portland State University, Whitten was in the news again when he was arrested after complaining about conditions on a Portland streetcar. In 2016, representing Know Your City, he spoke at a Portland City Council meeting about the importance of culturally relevant education.

In 2017, Whitten took part in protests against Donald Trump's executive order banning travelers from specific countries to the US. During one protest he filmed a violent incident and his footage was used in news reports. Whitten was later interviewed about the ban by Fox News; interviewer Tucker Carlson questioned Whitten's knowledge of the text of the order.

In 2018, Whitten founded a racial justice nonprofit named Brown Hope. Later that May, he launched Brown Hope's first event, called Reparations Happy Hour, which garnered significant attention in international news outlets. Whitten was later interviewed about the event by Fox News; interviewer Tucker Carlson questioned Whitten about whether the event was offensive.

== LGBT rights activism ==
In July 2018, Whitten became the Interim Executive Director of Q Center, a community center serving Portland's LGBTQ+ community, and was hired to help with an unexpected leadership transition. Shortly after, he accepted a Light a Fire award from Portland Monthly Magazine on behalf of the organization for its years of advocacy for Portland's LGBTQ+ community. In February 2019, Whitten led the organization of an emergency LGBTQ2SIA+ town hall after a series of reports of physical attacks against LGBT individuals in Portland. In June 2019, Whitten launched a capital campaign that raised of $100,000 to renovate Q Center.

== 2020 Metro Council campaign ==
On January 21, 2020, Whitten announced his campaign for Metro Council, with endorsements from US Representative Elizabeth Furse and several Portland city councilors. He resigned his position with Q Center in order to focus full-time on the campaign.

== Personal life ==
Whitten identifies as queer.

== Controversy ==
On December 8, 2022, Whitten was placed on paid leave pending an internal investigation of what the president of Whitten’s non-profit Brown Hope called “multiple serious allegations.”

On 14 December 2022, at a meeting of the Brown Hope board of directors, attended by Whitten and the two other directors, Whitten was reinstated. The board was extended from three members (including Whitten) to five members, and a decision was taken to have an independent external party investigate the allegations made against Whitten by the anonymous whistleblower. According to the board chairman this investigation concluded that the allegations were “legally unfounded”.

On 17 July 2023 the ex-Chief Operating Officer of Brown Hope, Brondalyn Coleman, filed a lawsuit against Brown Hope and Whitten in Multnomah County Circuit Court seeking $5 million in damages. The lawsuit is based on a similar but expanded set of allegations as those submitted to the organization in 2022. Coleman joined Brown Hope in September 2021, and was fired by Whitten in January 2023 due to a breakdown of their relationship. The suit is ongoing as at 2 November 2023.

In addition an investigation begun by the Oregon Department of Justice in December 2022 is also ongoing.

== Electoral history ==
2012 Oregon State Treasurer election
Party	Candidate	Votes	%
Democratic	Ted Wheeler	955,213	57.8
Republican	Tom Cox	609,989	36.9
Progressive	Cameron Whitten	38,762	2.3
Libertarian	John F Mahler	30,002	1.8
Constitution	Michael Paul Marsh	15,415	0.9
Write-in		2,181	0.1
Total votes		1,651,562	100%

== See also ==
- List of LGBT people from Portland, Oregon
