= Shine Distillery and Grill =

Distillery in Portland, Oregon, U.S.

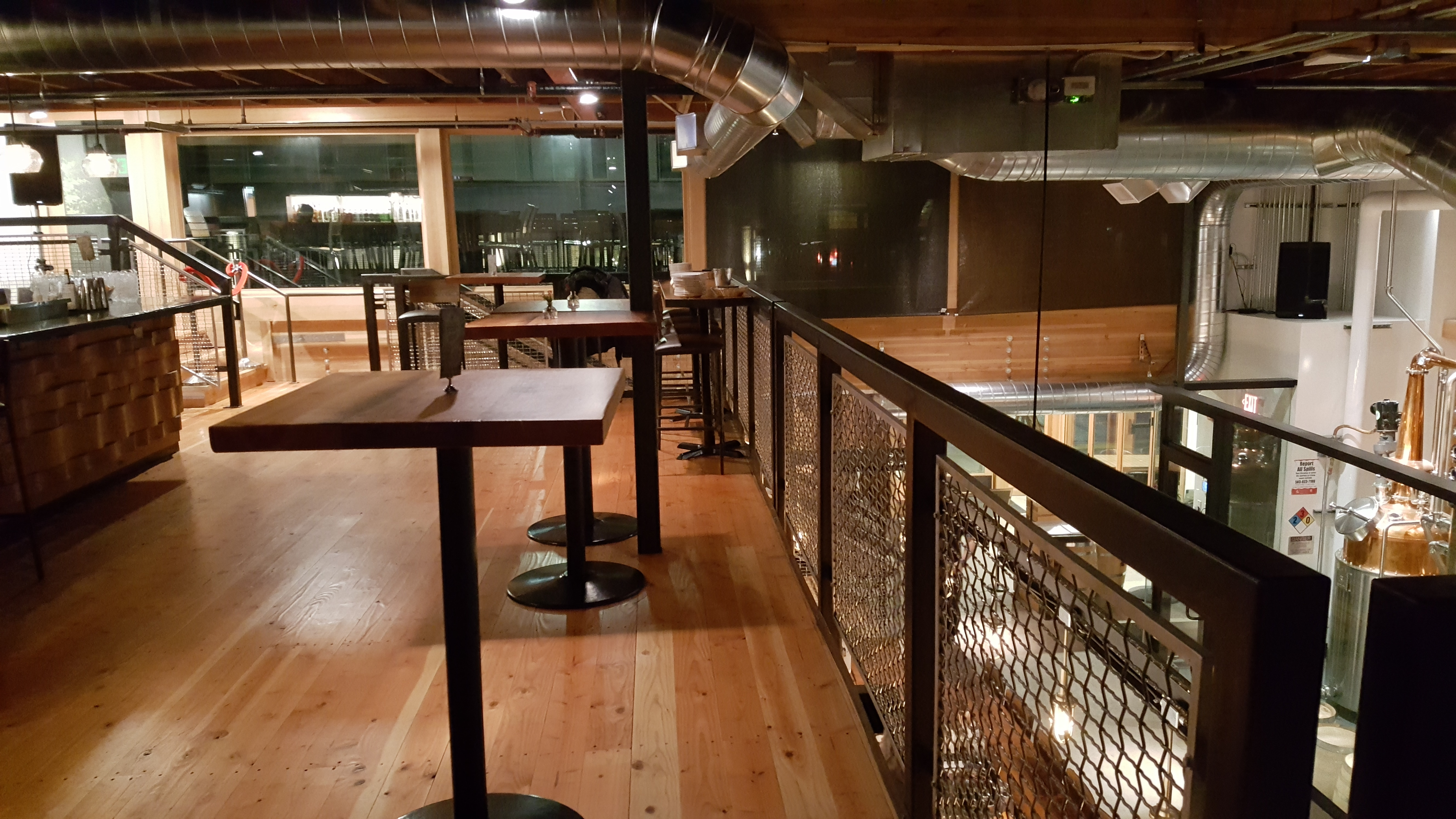
- The restaurant's upstairs interior, 2019
- Interactive map of Shine Distillery and Grill

Restaurant information
- Owner: Jonathan Poteet
- Chef: Julian Solomon
- Location: 4232 N. Williams Avenue, Portland, Multnomah County, Oregon, 97217, United States
- Coordinates: 45.5544°N 122.6663°W
- Seating capacity: 250
- Website: shinedistillerygrill.com

Shine Distillery and Grill is a distillery which previously operated a bar and restaurant in Portland, Oregon's Boise neighborhood, in the United States.

== Description ==
Shine is a distillery which previously operated a bar and restaurant at the corner of Williams and Skidmore in northeast Portland, serving gin, vodka, and whiskey. The two-floor, 250-capacity venue had a family-friendly dining area and an upstairs with a patio for patrons 21 and older. Jonathan Poteet is the owner; Shannon Mosley and Julian Solomon were the master distiller and chef, respectively, as of mid 2019. Shine was the first restaurant, distillery and food service business of its kind in Oregon. The restaurant was also described as a gay bar and a "queer space" by Portland Monthly and Eater Portland, respectively.

== History ==
The restaurant opened in July 2019. Operations were scheduled to start in December 2018, but were delayed because of the 2018–2019 United States federal government shutdown.

Shine began producing hand sanitizer from alcohol for customers during the COVID-19 pandemic. The business also hosted drive-through performances by drag queens, including Bolivia Charmichaels and Lulu Luscious in 2020. The series returned in 2021.

The restaurant closed in 2023, though Poteet hopes to continue operating the distillery.
