= Byron Beck (blogger) =

American journalist

- Occupation: Blogger
- Writing career
- Genre: Non-fiction

Byron Beck is a Portland, Oregon-based journalist and blogger who contributes to national publications, radio and television.

== Work ==
From 2001 to 2008. Beck authored Willamette Week's "Queer Window" column. Around 2009, Beck started his own blog, which has been describes as a "go-to source for Portland entertainment nuggets" and earned him the reputation of being a "celebrity spotter". He was the first to report several stories using his blog, including Justin Bieber's visit to the Adidas Village in October 2012 and Just Out's publication ending in February 2013.

In 2012, The Oregonian profiled Beck as one of their fifty "community blog partners". Beck expressed his satisfaction's with the blog's growth over three years, described himself as "relentless", and summarized Portland with the single word "magic". He mentioned his work as host of the Earth2World.com television talk show Have You Heard? and teased about an upcoming radio project. Scheduled to launch in February 2014 was a two-hour talk show co-hosted with DJ Bombshel Bailey and producer Zak Kindrachuk called Bailey and Beck for Portland's KXL-FM. Beck said of the program: "It's a talk show that's just going to be a little bit different than what KXL has done before—more culture and less politics. It's a new direction for the company. I mean, come on, from Glenn Beck to Byron Beck? I think that's a huge leap forward." However, the show never came to fruition. Beck did, however, co-host a show with Zak Burns called Beck and Burns. PQ Monthly called the show "an ideal blend of the comedic and the serious, of politics and celebrity gossip — the stuff of perfect radio".

In August 2014, he became a contributor to GoLocalPDX, a local news website and offshoot of GoLocal24.

In October 2014, Beck took over emcee duties for Phil Olsen, show organizer and planned host of the World Beard and Moustache Championships. Beck was criticized for reportedly "rushing and even belittling" contestants in an effort to quicken the pace. The Oregonian said, "Being short on time is understandable, but his loud and manic energy made the second half unbearable, taking away from the fun and giving way to an unruly crowd that began to shout and boo through the partial beards." Marjorie Skinner, a competition judge and Portland Mercury contributor, responded by writing, "[The Oregonian] kind of slayed Beck on his emcee duties, but he was being thrown a lot of direction behind the scenes to variously slow down and speed up the proceedings, including the occasional request that he "tell some jokes" and otherwise fill time while the next round of contestants were being lined up... in Beck's defense, it was a long, unscripted gig in front of a rowdy audience. I didn't envy him."

== Personal life ==
Beck and his partner Juan Martinez were plaintiffs in Martinez v. Kulongoski, the lawsuit challenging Measure 36's inclusion on the 2004 ballot. On January 14, 2009, the Oregon Supreme Court denied petition to hear Martinez v. Kulongoski. In May 2014, after Michael McShane decided to overturn the state's ban on same-sex marriage, Beck posted a tweet which read: "Just asked Juan Martinez to marry me in front of Jamie Wilson & FOX12 cameras. JUAN SAID YES! #bigday". The couple were married by Attorney General Ellen Rosenblum on May 30, 2015.

For more than a dozen years, Beck has attended the Harvest Dinner, an annual event which provides food and medical and hygiene services to homeless and underserved residents. Beck competed in the Celebrity Crab Cracking competition at the Portland Seafood and Wine Festival in 2013 and 2014 and was runner-up in 2014.

== See also ==
- List of LGBTQ people from Portland, Oregon
