= Millennium Plaza Park =

Park in Lake Oswego, Oregon, U.S.

Coordinates: 45°25′04″N 122°39′56″W

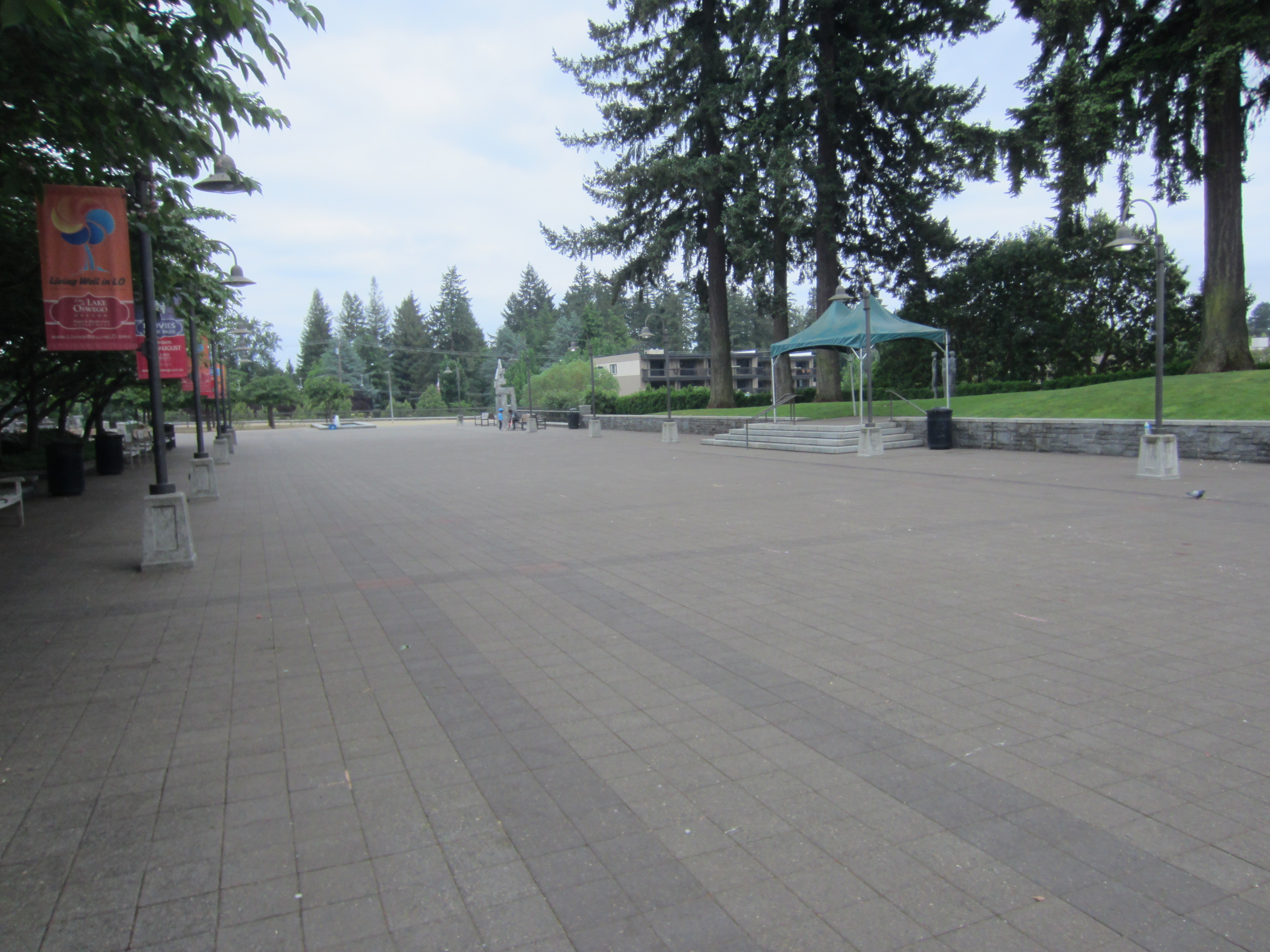
- Paved plaza in 2018
- Interactive map of Millennium Plaza Park
- Location: Lake Oswego, Oregon
- Open: 1999
- Status: Open

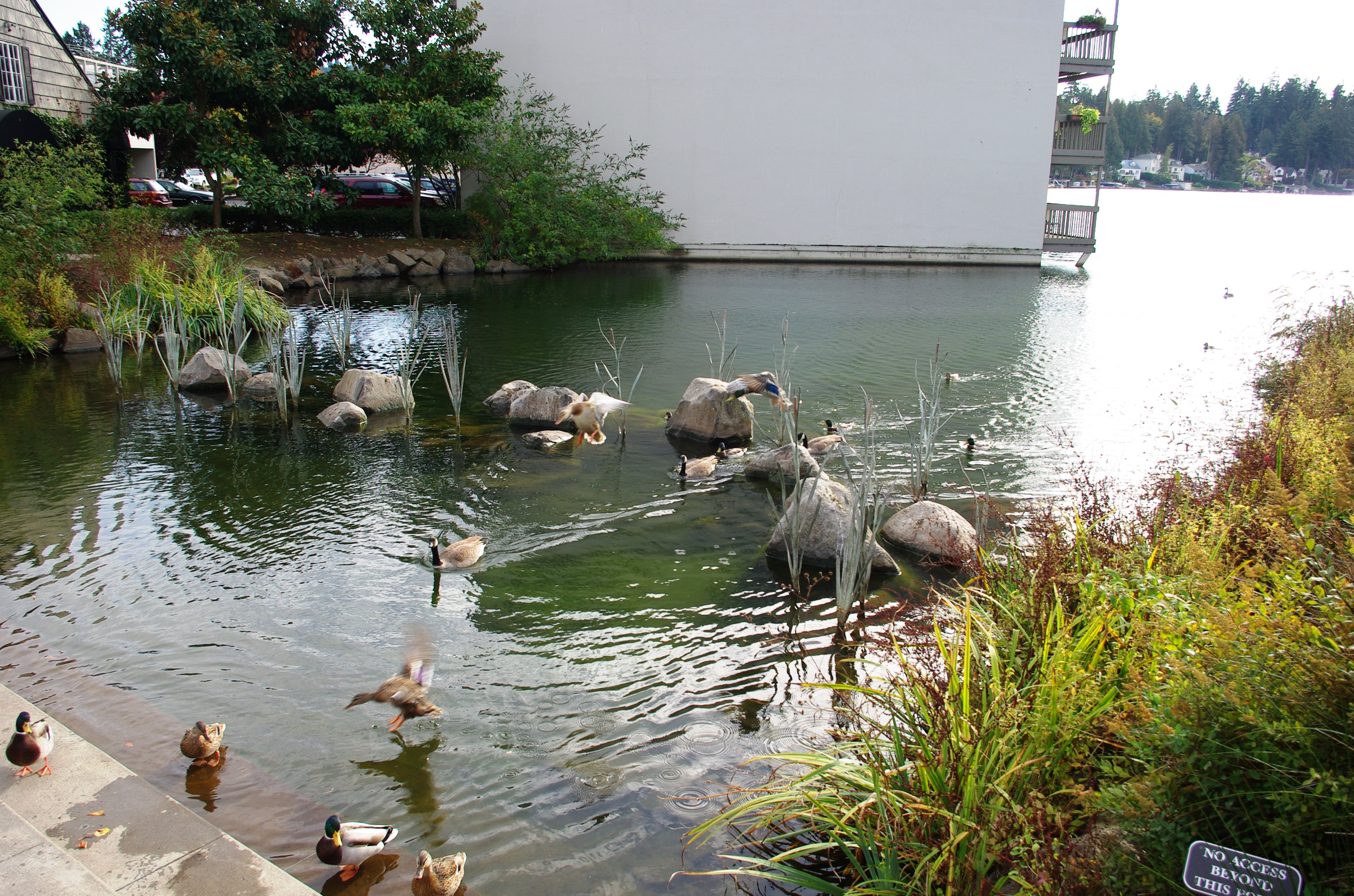
Mallards at Millennium Plaza Park on Lakewood Bay, 2009

Millennium Plaza Park is an urban park in Lake Oswego, Oregon, United States. It features a large paved plaza, a fireplace, a reflecting pond, and a pergola, with views of Lakewood Bay. The park opened in 1999, and hosts a farmers' market. It has also been a start and finish site for the annual Lake Run event. The park has hosted Pride Lake Oswego.

== Artworks ==
- Angkor I
