= LGBTQ culture in Portland, Oregon =

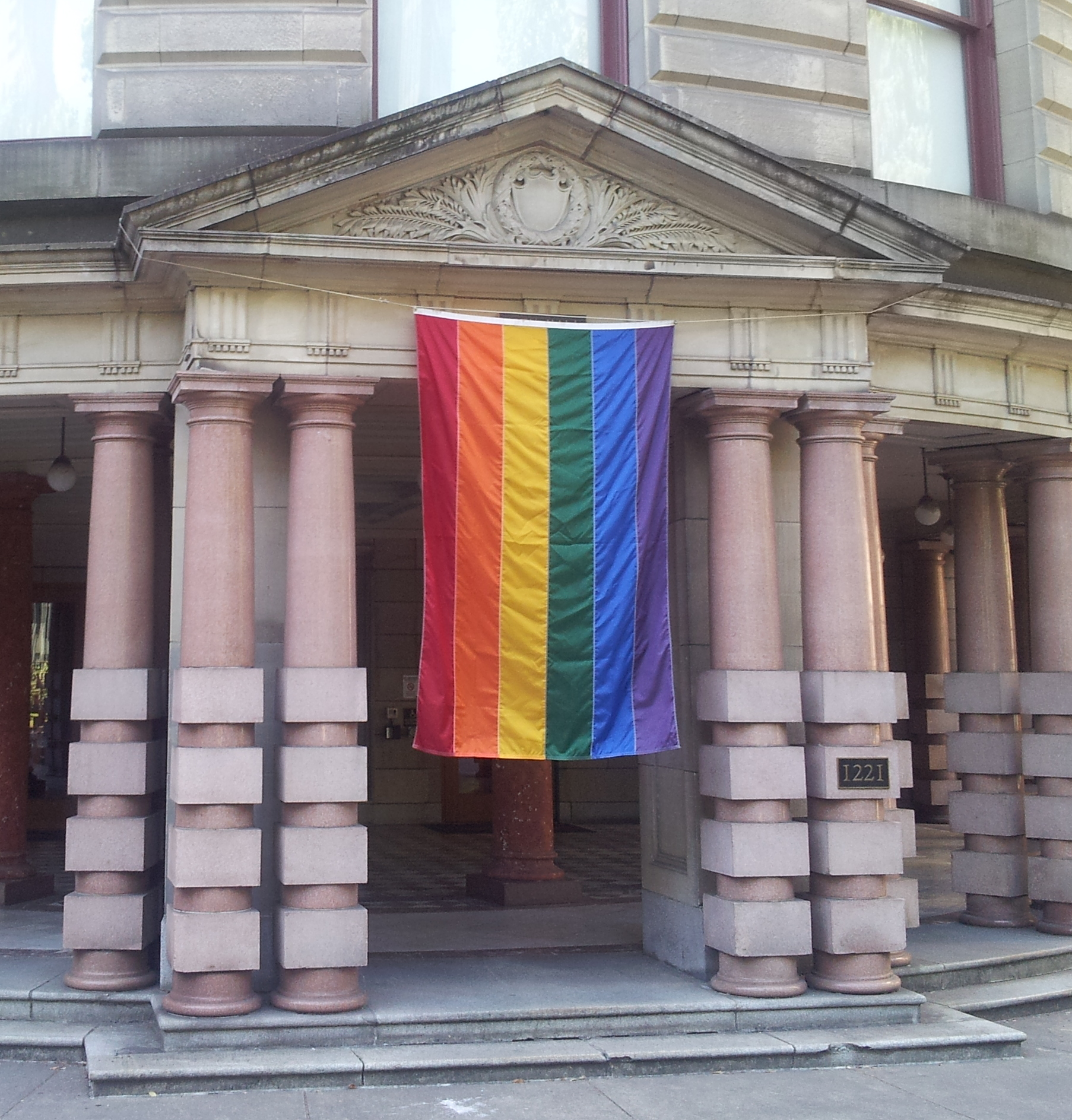
A rainbow pride flag at Portland City Hall on June 26, 2015, the day gay marriage was legalized in the U.S.

LGBTQ culture in Portland, Oregon is an important part of the culture of Oregon and broader Pacific Northwest culture. Portland ranked fourth in The Advocate's 2026 list of the fifteen safest American cities for LGBTQ+ travel, and in 2025, Lonely Planet featured Portland as one of the top fifty most queer-friendly cities in world in The LGBTQ+ Travel Guide. Portland scored 100 out of 100 on the Human Rights Campaign's Municipal Equality Index in 2025. Of all the large metropolitan areas in the United States, the Portland metropolitan area has the second-highest percent of LGBTQ adults per capita, with the Williams Institute reporting that 6.0% of Portland adults identify as LGBT as of 2021. The majority of the Portland area is located in Multnomah County, which has the highest concentration of lesbian couples of any U.S. county of the same size or larger as of 2024.

== History ==
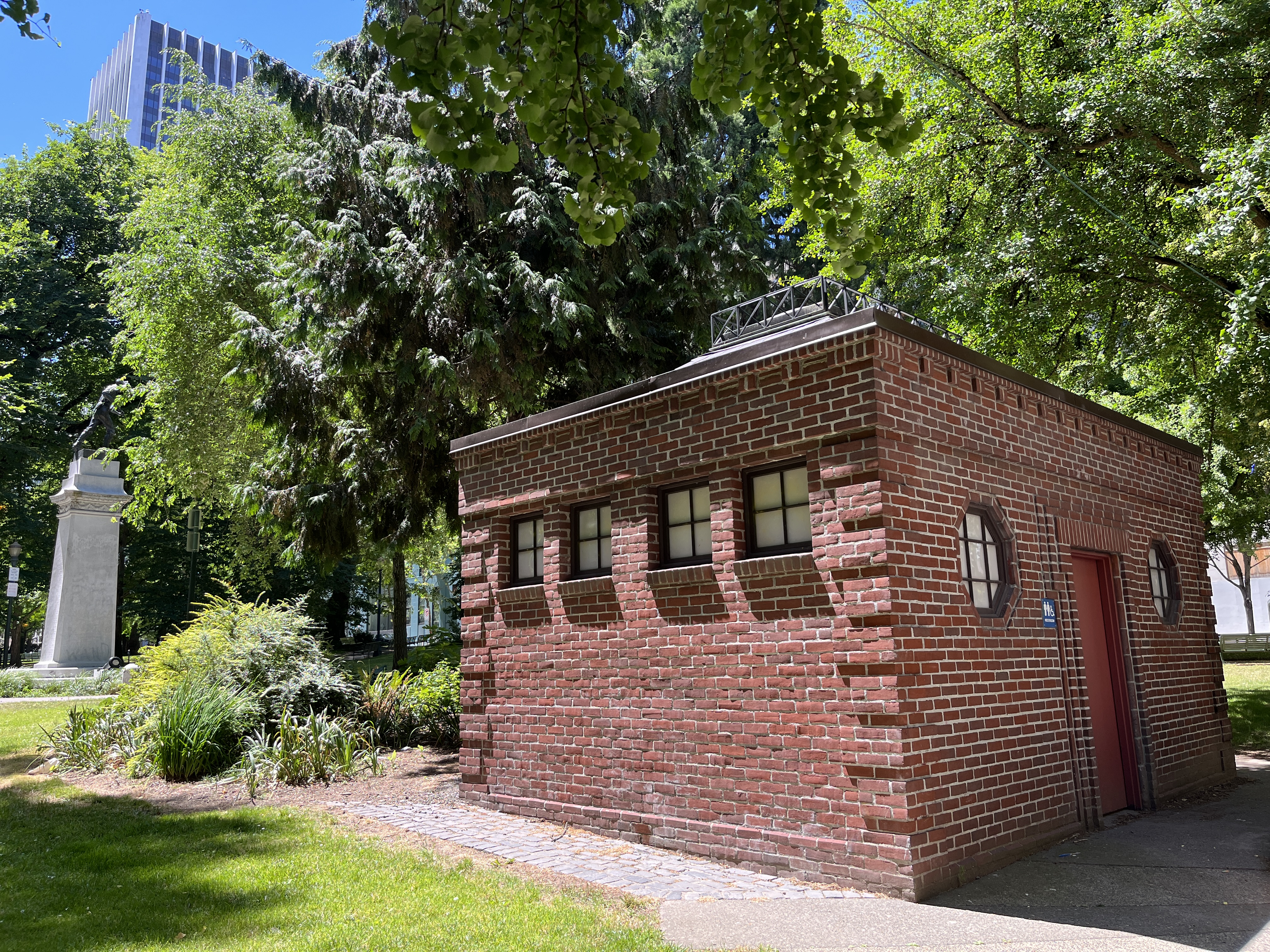
The public bathroom in Lownsdale Square (pictured in 2023) was a popular place for anonymous sex and gay cruising from 1909 to 1929.

In the late 19th and early 20th centuries, there was a thriving LGBTQ subculture in Portland, although this community was largely concealed from those outside of it in order to protect against societal homophobia, including the state's sodomy laws. To avoid detection, many LGBTQ people gathered in private spaces, such as homes and private clubs, and the public establishments that they gathered in were ones that did not advertise their presence. However, a number of gay-owned and gay-friendly establishments, like the Louvre (a "bohemian" restaurant purchased by Theodore Kruse in 1907), provided covert semi-public gathering places. In the early 19th century, Lownsdale Square was a popular place for anonymous sex and gay cruising; Lownsdale Square was officially designated a mens-only park in the 1920s, and the public bathroom there, known as a "T" room, was a focal point for local gay men's sexuality from about 1909 to 1929. Council Crest Amusement Park in southwest Portland was also "a trysting place" for gay men.

In 1906, lesbian physician Marie Equi, who lived in Portland at the time, became the first known LGBTQ hero to be publicly acclaimed in Oregon. She received a medal from the U.S. Army and press in Oregon praised her role in the Portland relief mission that helped victims of the 1906 San Francisco earthquake. In 1907, Equi and her girlfriend Harriet Speckart won second prize for their carriage entry in the first ever Portland Rose Festival.

=== 1910s–1920s ===
In 1912, a shoplifting arrest led to investigations of Portland's LGBTQ community, and during 1912 to 1913 details about the subculture were revealed to the broader public in what would become known as the Portland vice scandal. Many gay men were outed and accused of various sex crimes, and some of these men were charged with violating sodomy law and tried in court. There were a few guilty verdicts, all of them on "charges involving private, consensual sexual activity." Even though most of these verdicts were later reversed by the Oregon Supreme Court, the local LGBTQ community was rocked by these events; some were fired from their jobs, went into hiding, or attempted to flee the state. One person attempted suicide in the downtown YMCA, which had been reported as an important residence and sexual space for members of the local LGBTQ community, and another person committed suicide at the Byron Hotel in downtown Portland. The Louvre, which had become a center for gay culture locally, closed as a result of the publicity. Many Oregonians first learned about Portland's LGBTQ subculture as a result of the Portland vice scandal.

The Rainbow Grill was established in 1913 by Theodore Kruse, who had previously owned the Louvre. It closed in June 1915, unable to sustain sufficient patronage to stay open. In 1916, Oregon enacted a Prohibition law, banning all drinking establishments and further stimying the reemergence of LGBTQ social life.

Starting in the 1920s, Julian Eltinge, noted as "the most famous female impersonator of the vaudeville era," performed at the Heilig Theater in Portland. Eltinge was popular among the gay community. In 1928, another gay sex scandal driven by the Portland Morals Board led to the arrest of 10 people.

=== 1930s–1940s ===
Founded in 1936, the Rathskeller became an important pickup place along servicemen during World War II. The Music Hall nightclub, founded in 1937 in downtown Portland, was also an important hub of LGBTQ nightlife in the city, and hosted "female and male impersonation acts" during the 1940s. In 1946, a former servicemember founded the Harbor Club Tavern, but the military quickly barred servicemembers from going there because it was known to be frequented by a gay and lesbian clientele. Dinty Moore tavern attracted "merchant seamen", and "a secluded gay beach developed at the eastern edge of Hayden Island". The Buick Café was also noted as a lesbian hangout spot. While there were few explicitly LGBTQ clubs or bars in the late 1940s, establishments such as the Cupboard and the Multnomah Hotel were frequented by gay and lesbian patrons, who could meet and find hookups there without harassment, "provided they mind themselves."

Following World War II, returning servicemembers across the U.S. began to seek and create queer social lives. Backlash against this emerging movement grew into the Lavender Scare and a broader "sex-crime panic" with lurid headlines targeting gay people, especially gay men. During her tenure (1949–1953), Portland Mayor Dorothy McCullough Lee began the first official municipal campaign against LGBTQ rights in Oregon, vowing to "clean up" the growing LGBTQ nightlife, which she saw as part of the vice conditions in the city. In 1949, two women began to spend time at the Music Hall, which had become increasingly popular after the war, in an attempt to catch lesbians attempting to pick them up. They were not successful in this, but they provided regular reports on the drag shows. Lee worked with the Oregon Liquor and Cannabis Commission (OLCC), which is responsible for issuing liquor licenses in Oregon, to pressure the owners of the establishment until they agreed to shut down the drag shows because the Music Hall was operating using the same liquor license as a connected bar called The Back Stage.

=== 1950s–1960s ===
During the 1950s and 1960s, officers of the Portland Police Bureau (PPB) "vigorously entrapped gay men in parks and public restrooms", with weekly patrols and arrests in 1953 and 1956. In 1952, Lew Wallace, who was running for mayor, attacked Lee on the basis that she wasn't doing enough to shut down the LGBTQ subculture in Portland. Lee responded by forming a committee that produced "a plan to combat 'sex deviates' at the local level." The plan was never officially enacted, and Lee lost the election. During this period, local media, including the Oregon Journal and the Oregonian, published sensationalized stories about crimes committed by LGBTQ people. Several arrests of "homosexual ring[s]", consisting of men who had "sexual relations with [...] area youths", were conducted in the 1950s. Oregon's sodomy laws were also expanded during this time, including a "psychopathic offender" law in 1953, a law prohibiting those convicted of sodomy from becoming a schoolteacher in 1957, and the Oregon Supreme Court's unanimous ruling in 1961 that cunnilingus should be included among outlawed sex acts.

The Transfusion Inn was "a working-class lesbian bar" that opened in the 1950s.

In 1961, Jeannace June Freeman, a lesbian from Oregon, was sentenced to death for the murder of her partner's children. At first, Portland residents, including LGBTQ residents, were publicly unsympathetic to Freeman. Her partner's testimony and media coverage of the trial painted Freeman as an emotionless killer and emphasized her masculinity, even after she began wearing skirts and makeup in court. In parts of the U.S. where the homophile movement had begun to emerge, activists like Barbara Gittings wrote in Freeman's defense; Gittings said it seemed like Freeman was sentenced to death more for her sexual orientation than for the actual crime of which she was convicted. As more details about her life and the case emerged, the public became more sympathetic, although much of the change in public opinion was based on the idea that the state had "neglected" Freeman by allowing her to be a lesbian as a result of her traumatic childhood, and media coverage painted her in a more feminine light as their coverage began to humanize her more. Ultimately, in 1964, Oregonians voted to ban the death penalty, and Governor Mark Hatfield commuted Freeman's sentence to life imprisonment.

In 1963, the PPB arrested several people who they accused of being part of a "state-wide homosexual ring", and the story became another high-profile gay sex scandal. The Oregonian published an editorial claiming "older, confirmed homosexuals are recruiting innocent young boys into their groups and persuading them to adopt perverted sex habits".

The PPB generally took a "hands-off" approach to LGBTQ bars, meaning they generally did not practice raids on the establishments, instead opting to surveil the LGBTQ community where they gathered in the hopes that they could be confined to a small section of society. However, individual arrests for sex acts or "moral infractions" occurred and the PPB "occasionally influenced the OLCC to suspend licenses when bars permitted dancing and countenanced 'lewd' behavior." A temporary exception to the "hands-off" policy came in 1964, during the moral panic following the 1963 arrests. Mayor Terry Schrunk launched the Committee for Decent Literature and Films to suppress LGBTQ literature in the city, which he saw as a corrupting influence for the city's youths. Oregon Journal columnist Doug Baker, police officers, and Schrunk complained there were increasing numbers of gay people in Portland, claiming people were moving to the city to take advantage of its relatively lax atmosphere of repression compared to cities like San Francisco, which saw many raids on gay bars in the 1960s. After meeting to discuss methods to shut down LGBTQ social life, Portland City Council and the mayor asked the OLCC to revoke liquor licenses for all of the city's gay bars. Targeted bars included Derek's Tavern and the Milwaukee Tavern. Jim Damis, the attorney of Derek's Tavern owner Derek Akerson, defended the rights of gay people to gather in public, arguing that the attempt to shut them down violated the Civil Rights Act. Ultimately, the OLCC refused the Council's demands after finding that the bars were operating lawfully. In early 1965, Schrunk appealed to Oregon Governor Mark Hatfield, who did not agree to help influence the OLCC. However, the City Council found they were able to revoke the food license for the Harbor Club, which closed as a result. The Transfusion Inn also closed in 1964. The Council found they could not take further legal action against the remaining LGBTQ businesses, so city officials returned to their previous policy of "hands-off" surveillance.

In response to post-World War II oppression, LGBTQ communities across the country mainly responded in two ways: some attempted to hide and isolate themselves to avoid persecution, while others began to organize politically, forming the homophile movement, which emerged first on the West Coast. While cities like San Francisco, Los Angeles, and Seattle formed organizations like the Mattachine Society, the Daughters of Bilitis, and One inc., Portland did not see the formation of a public political advocacy movement during this time. Publications from homophile organizations in other cities were available but limited, only carried at a handful of shops and hidden behind counters so that people had to specifically request them.

In 1964, the Other Inn was established, becoming Portland's first leather bar. In 1967, Darcelle XV opened the Darcelle XV Showplace, Portland's first drag club and one of the country's two known drag clubs that opened before 1970. It was established on the edge of the Burnside Triangle, a triangle-shaped district that was home to many LGBTQ businesses and was the city's gayborhood from the mid-20th century to the 2010s. 1968 saw the establishment of Outside In, which provides resources to LGBTQ youth, as well as the Metropolitan Community Church, which held their first meeting in the YMCA's Parker Chapel.

Organizers from homophile organizations across the region began to seriously discuss ways to spark a homophile movement in Portland around this time. In 1968, organizers in Seattle planned to hold the Northwest Homophile Conference in Portland in the hopes of starting up a homophile movement in the city, but the plans for the conference did not materialize. Historian Peter Boag argues that while it is difficult to point to a single factor to explain why the Portland LGBTQ community began organizing politically later than LGBTQ communities in other cities, it may have been impacted by the PPB's "hands-off" policy, which made it so people could, generally, have queer social lives in clubs and bars without facing the direct and constant harassment that police in other cities directed toward their local LGBTQ establishments. However, in 1969, a handful of "female impersonators" created the Portland Forum as a social and cultural organization for the LGBTQ community.

Embers Avenue opened in 1969.

"Lesbian Roommate" obscenity trial

A Portland jury convicted a newsstand operator, Childs for selling Lesbian Roommate which was categorized as legally obscene. This was despite the fact that it was less graphic than legally protected literature such as D.H. Lawrence's Lady Chatterley's Lover.

- WomanShare and other lesbian land movements

=== 1970s ===
Less than a year after the Stonewall riots, LGBTQ activists started the Portland Gay Liberation Front (GLF) and began organizing for gay liberation. The first meeting was attended by 40 people and was held on March 24, 1970, in the Ninth Street Exit coffeehouse in the basement of Centenary-Wilbur United Methodist Church. The newly formed Portland GLF placed advertisements in a Portland counter-culture publication called the Willamette Bridge, and began to organize social events, rallies, press engagement, lobbying, and other actions to advocate for LGBTQ rights. The gay liberation movement in Portland saw the establishment of organizations like the Second Foundation (est. 1970), (Note: Named after Isaac Asimov's science fiction novel, Second Foundation.) which in 1971 established the Fountain as city's first LGBTQ publication, opened the first gay community center in the state in 1972, and held the city's first pride celebration indoors. Also in 1972, gay activist Lanny Swerdlow began to host Homophile Half-Hour, the state's first program about LGBTQ issues, on the KBOO radio channel.

Around 1971, a women's movement began to form in Portland to advocate for women's rights, build communal spaces that centered women, and organize social events. The movement was primarily led by lesbians and radical feminists and was involved in many Portland-area LGBTQ advocacy organizations. According to lesbian attorney Cindy Comfer, women in this movement "began creating some of the first lesbian families with children from heterosexual unions, donor insemination, or in later years formal adoption", and this represented "a genesis of the modern gay family/gay marriage movement."

Educational institutions such as Portland State University (PSU), Reed College, and Lewis & Clark College became hubs for the local LGBTQ student movement in the 1970s. Gay Student Unions, like PSU'S Gay Men's Union, supported and advocated for students and organized LGBTQ events. Parents of Gays was founded in 1977 for the co-founders "to support their own LGBTQ+ children and other Portland families", and quickly expanded after publicization by local LGBTQ press.

Portland Town Council, the state's first LGBT umbrella organization, was founded in 1974 and began to advocate for LGBT rights through mainstream politics. Also in 1974, the Second Foundation's gay community center closed, leaving Portland "without a dedicated LGBTQ+ community center for several years." In 1975, about 200 people attended Portland's first outdoor Pride Fair at the South Park Blocks near PSU, and the city's first Pride Festival with a parade was held in 1977, with 300 to 400 people marching along the route. Portland Town Council organized a local march on the same weekend as the National March on Washington for Lesbian and Gay Rights in October 1979.

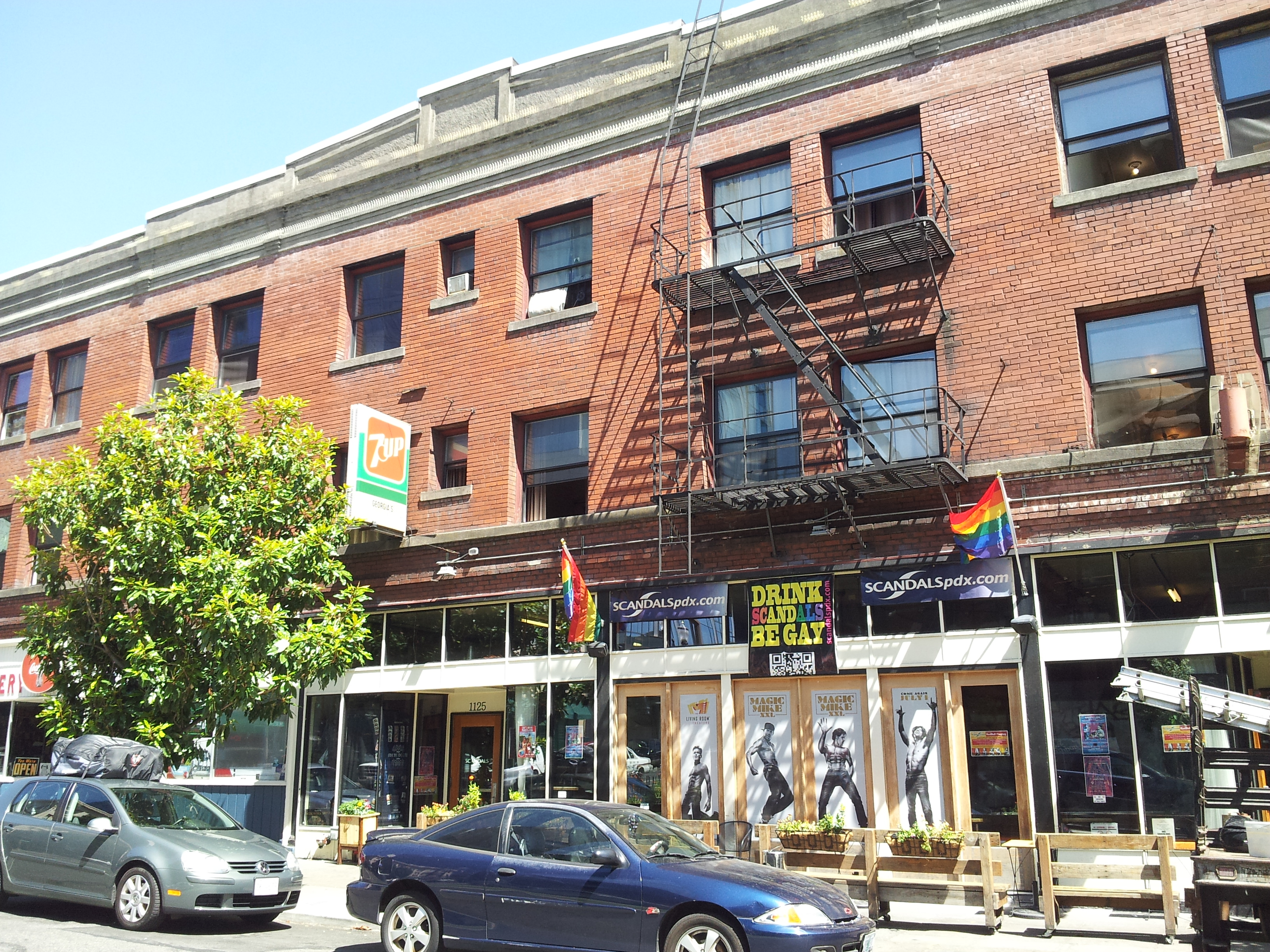
Scandals (pictured in 2015) operated in the Stark Street space that housed Three Sisters Tavern.

LGBTQ and allied businesses founded during the 1970s included A Woman's Place Bookstore (1973), Tom Kat Theater (1973), Wilde Oscar's (1976–1983), (Note: Named after Oscar Wilde) Roxy Heart's restaurant (1977) Rising Moon (1978–1985), and Scandals (1979). Gay bathhouses were popular in Portland in the 1970s, with the Workout Baths (later Olympic Baths Uptown) becoming the city's first "gay-owned and operated" bathhouse when it opened in 1969, followed by Majestic Hotel and Club Baths in 1971.

=== 1980s–1990s ===
The Portland Gay Men's Chorus and Black Lesbians and Gays United were founded in 1980. Also in 1980, 10 gay-bashing incidents were reported in Laurelhurst Park. In response to community concerns, Tom Potter became the PPB's first ever liaison to the LGBTQ community in 1981. Parents of Gays became Portland's branch of PFLAG, a national support organization for LGBTQ youth and their families, in 1982. Cascade Voice was established in 1982, and in 1983, following discontent within the staff, Renée LaChance, Rupert Kinnard, and Jay Brown founded Just Out. Roxy Heart's was closed between 1988 and 1993, reopening in 1994 under the name The Roxy.

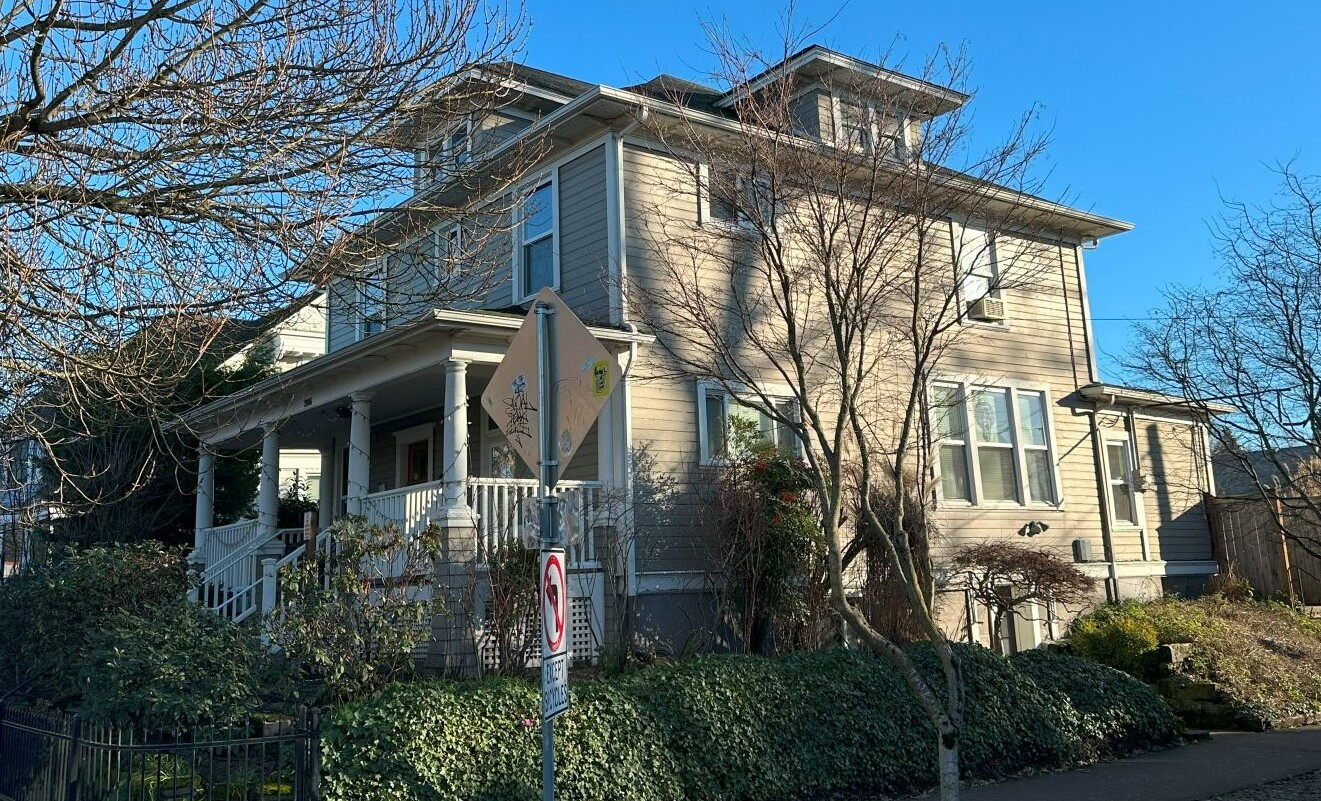
The Juniper House in 2025

Starting in the 1980s, the AIDS crisis had a major impact on Portland's LGBTQ community. In 1982, the city saw its first death attributed to complications of AIDS. Following this, Portland Town Council and Legacy Health worked together to hold the state's first public AIDS forum for health professionals and the gay community. Gay bathhouses in Portland began to wane in popularity, and many closed down during this period, although the bathhouse culture never completely disappeared. Rosetown Ramblers, which holds queer-friendly, gender neutral square dancing events, was established in 1983. The Portland Pride Parade grew throughout the 1980s, breaking its previous records for attendance with 3,000 people in 1984 and 5,000 people in 1988. The Juniper House opened in 1987 as the state's first residential specialty clinic for people affected by HIV/AIDS, serving a mostly LGBTQ clientele. Eventually, the organization outgrew the Juniper House and became a broader LGBTQ-centered organization now known as CAP Northwest.

In 1987, Governor Neil Goldschmidt signed Executive Order 8720 into law, effectively expanding workplace discrimination laws for employees of the state's executive branch so that they protected people of all sexual orientations. The Oregon Citizens Alliance (OCA), a conservative Christian activist group, responded by sponsoring 1988 Oregon Ballot Measure 8 to overturn the executive order and prohibit officials from implementing future measures to protect employees from discrimination based on sexual orientation. Measure 8 came before voters during the 1988 elections and was passed by a 5.4% margin. In 1989, the state of Oregon expanded hate crime law to include sexual orientation. Lesbian and University of Oregon employee Harriet P. Merrick partnered with the ACLU to challenge Ballot Measure 8 in court, and it was ruled unconstitutional by the Oregon Court of Appeals in 1992.

Meanwhile, in April 1991, Portland City Council "announced it would take up a gay rights ordinance with full protections in employment, housing, and public accommodation at the request of Right to Privacy PAC, the Lesbian Community Project, and the ACLU." Portland Commissioner Mike Lindberg promoted the ordinance, along with PPB Chief Tom Potter, State Representative Vera Katz (who represented the city of Portland), and others across the state. There were three public hearings leading up to the City Council vote, attended by supporters and opposition, the latter of which included Lon Mabon of the OCA, who vowed to "pursue a referendum" in the event that it passed the City Council vote. Portland City Council unanimously approved the ordinance on October 3, 1991. Eight days later, the OCA filed a Portland initiative to ban the city government from "promotion, encouragement or facilitation of homosexuality, pedophilia, sadism and masochism." The No on Hate campaign formed to oppose the OCA's referendum and picketed their signature gathering events. The OCA was ultimately unsuccessful in gathering enough signatures for the referendum to appear on the ballot that year, and 300 people gathered at the Pioneer Courthouse to celebrate.

At the time, the OCA was also sponsoring 1992 Oregon Ballot Measure 9, which would have amended the Constitution of Oregon to ban any civil rights protections based on sexual orientation on the basis that the government should not "promote, encourage, or facilitate homosexuality"; the wording in the Portland initiative was partly modeled off of the statewide ballot measure. Concerned by the success of Measure 8 and subsequent measures in local areas across the state, as well as by the expanded scope and extreme language of this new measure, LGBTQ people and their allies all over the state worked together to form the No on 9 movement, a broad coalition in opposition to Measure 9. Portland was one of the major organizing hubs for the movement, and demonstrations were held in the city, including a December 1991 protest where Queer Nation activists silently attended Portland's Foursquare Church holding signs and with pink gags over their mouths to protest the church's involvement with the OCA. Hundreds of people took part in a "Walk Against Hate" in June 1992 that began in Eugene and ended at that year's Portland Pride Parade, which was attended by 8,000 people–the most in its history up to that point–and featured many speeches in support of the No on 9 movement. Many aspects of modern LGBTQ organizing, culture, and community in Oregon were built during this campaign, which succeeded in its aims; the measure failed by a margin of nearly 13%. That same year, Multnomah County became the first U.S. public employer to extend health benefits to the domestic partners of county employees, with benefits coming into effect on July 1, 1993.

In October 1994, LGBTQ community leaders, alongside PPB Sheriff Tom Potter, formally established the "Sexual Minorities Round Table" with the goal of reducing harm against LGBTQ people and bridging divisions between the LGBTQ community and the PPB. The organization was later renamed "Alliance for Safer Communities". Also in 1994, voters rejected Oregon Ballot Measure 13, which was similar to 1992 Ballot Measure 9, by a 3% margin. The Gay and Lesbian Archives of the Pacific Northwest, now known as the Oregon Queer History Collective, was founded in 1994 by several PSU students–Tom Cook, Bonnie Tinker, Jeanine Wittcke, and Pat Young–in reaction to their shared professor Allan Bérubé's lectures emphasizing the need to preserve queer history.

In 1996, in a ruling on Tanner v. Oregon Health Sciences University, judge Stephen Gallagher mandated that the state of Oregon offer health, life, and dental insurance benefits to the domestic partners of gay state employees.

=== 2000s ===
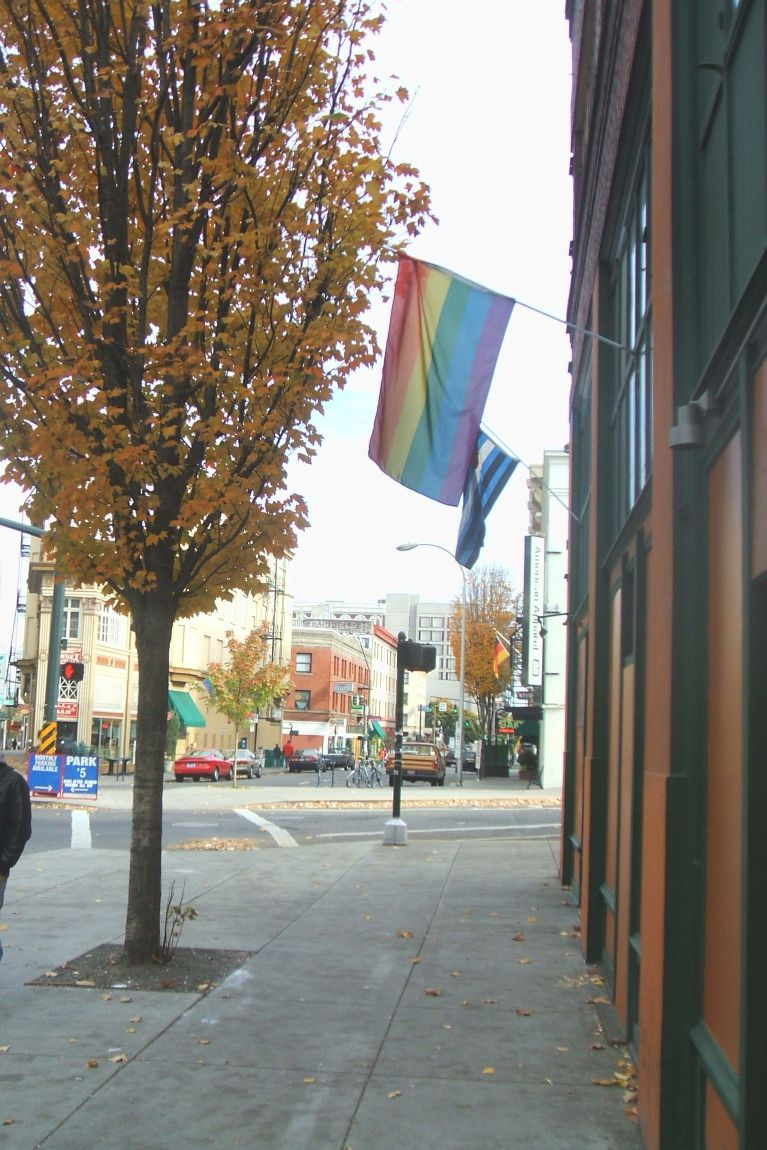
Rainbow flag displayed in the Burnside Triangle, 2006

In 2000, the OCA attempted to pass 2000 Oregon Ballot Measure 9, which would have prohibited public schools from teaching curriculum "Encouraging, Promoting, [or] Sanctioning Homosexual, [or] Bisexual Behaviors", but voters rejected the measure by a 5.7% margin.

Gay marriage was legal in Multnomah County in 2004 for a few months. More than 1,000 people were issued marriage licenses at the Multnomah County Courthouse. 2004 Oregon Ballot Measure 36, which passed by a 13% margin, amended the Constitution of Oregon to explicitly define marriage as being between one man and one woman, effectively banning same-sex marriage on the state level. Multnomah County was forced to nullify the issued marriage certificates and refunded the marriage license fee to the recipients in 2005. It was challenged in Martinez v. Kulongoski, and was affirmed by the Oregon Court of Appeals, and the Oregon Supreme Court refused to hear the case.

The Order of Benevolent Bliss, Portland's chapter of the Sisters of Perpetual Indulgence, was established in June 2005, inspired by the Seattle chapter.

In 2007, Governor Ted Kulongoski signed the Oregon Equality Act into law, banning discrimination based on sexual orientation and gender identity in public accommodation, housing, employment, and some (but not all) other areas. Kulongoski also signed the Oregon Family Fairness Act into law, creating a system for domestic partnership registration for same-sex couples so they could access "most of the benefits and obligations of marriage." Basic Rights Oregon, which is based in Portland, helped pass both acts through an "intense lobbying campaign".

In the 2008 mayoral elections, Sam Adams was elected mayor of Portland. This made Portland the largest U.S. city at the time to elect an openly gay mayor. Also in 2008, Sister Krissy Fiction (also known as Kurt Granzow) approached Multnomah County and asked them to light the Morrison Bridge red to commemorate World AIDS Day, and the tradition has continued up to the present.

=== 2010–present ===
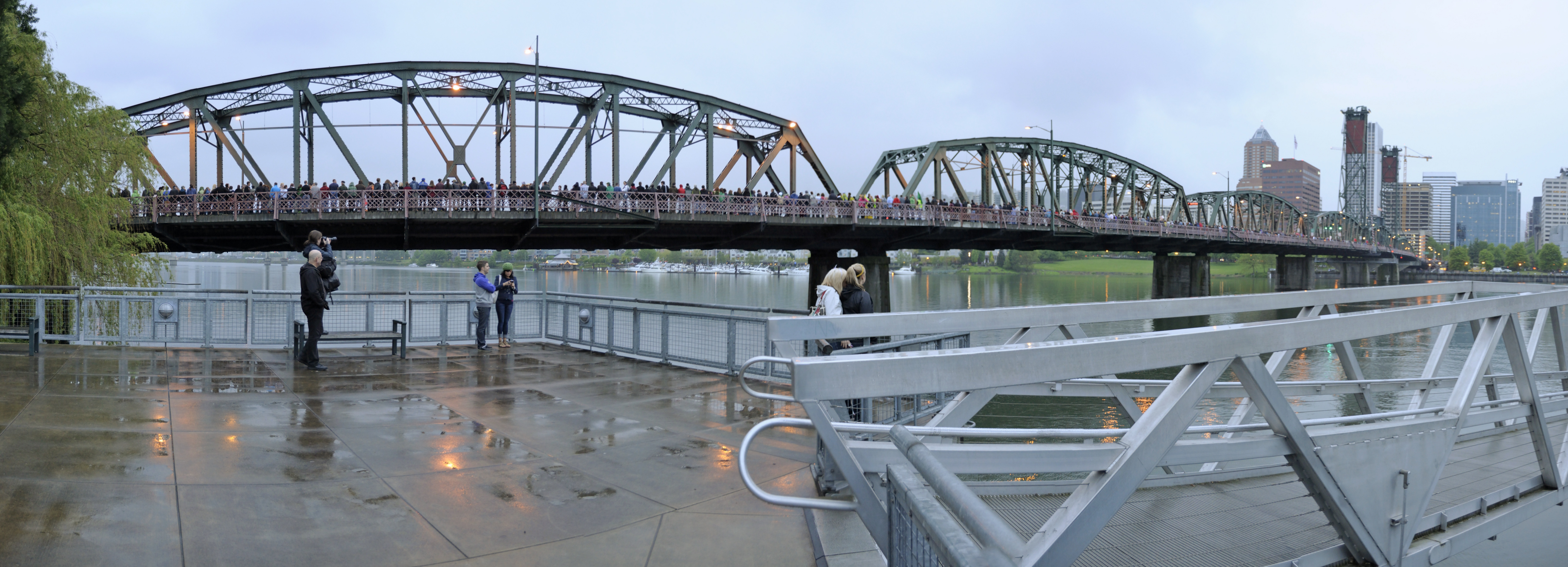
Hands Across Hawthorne attendants lined up across the entire length of the Hawthorne Bridge.

TriMet bus in Portland, Oregon, 2026

In May 2011, Hands Across Hawthorne was organized in response to an attack on two men who were holding hands on the Hawthorne Bridge; over 4,000 people attended. Just Out closed in December 2013.

On June 26, 2015, gay marriage was legalized in the United States with the Supreme Court ruling on Obergefell v. Hodges. In Portland, hundreds of people gathered to celebrate, and a rainbow pride flag was put up in Portland City Hall. In 2016, local drag queen and long-time community activist Darcelle XV entered the Guinness Book of World Records as the oldest working drag queen. In 2018, the City of Portland renamed the historically LGBTQ 13-block stretch of Southwest Stark Street formerly known as the Burnside Triangle, naming it after American gay rights activist Harvey Milk. Oregon's hate crime law was expanded again in 2019, and one of the updates added gender identity as a protected class.

In 2020, the Darcelle XV Showplace was listed on the National Register of Historic Places (NRHP). In 2021, the city's first mural commemorating the LGBTQ community was installed in the Pearl District. The mural, titled Never Look Away, highlights eight LGBTQ activists, including local figures like cartoonist Rupert Kinnard, Q Center founding board member David Martinez, Oregon Supreme Court Justice Lynn Nakamoto, and Portland Two-Spirit Society founder Asa Wright, as well as national figures like Marsha P. Johnson.

In 2022, the Alliance for Safer Communities disbanded due to a lack of volunteers willing to lead the program. The Roxy also closed in 2022. The city government's LGBTQ+ Historic Sites Project ran from 2022 to 2024, with the goal of documenting and honoring places that have historically been significant to local LGBTQ history. This project led to the Crystal Hotel building and Erv Lind Field being added to the NRHP in 2024. In 2023, Drag-a-thon set a Guinness World Record for the longest drag artist stage show.

During the national anti-LGBTQ backlash in the 2020s, LGBTQ people began to move out of states that were becoming more hostile to the community, and Portland became one of the most prominent destinations, particularly for trans "gender refugees".

== Events ==
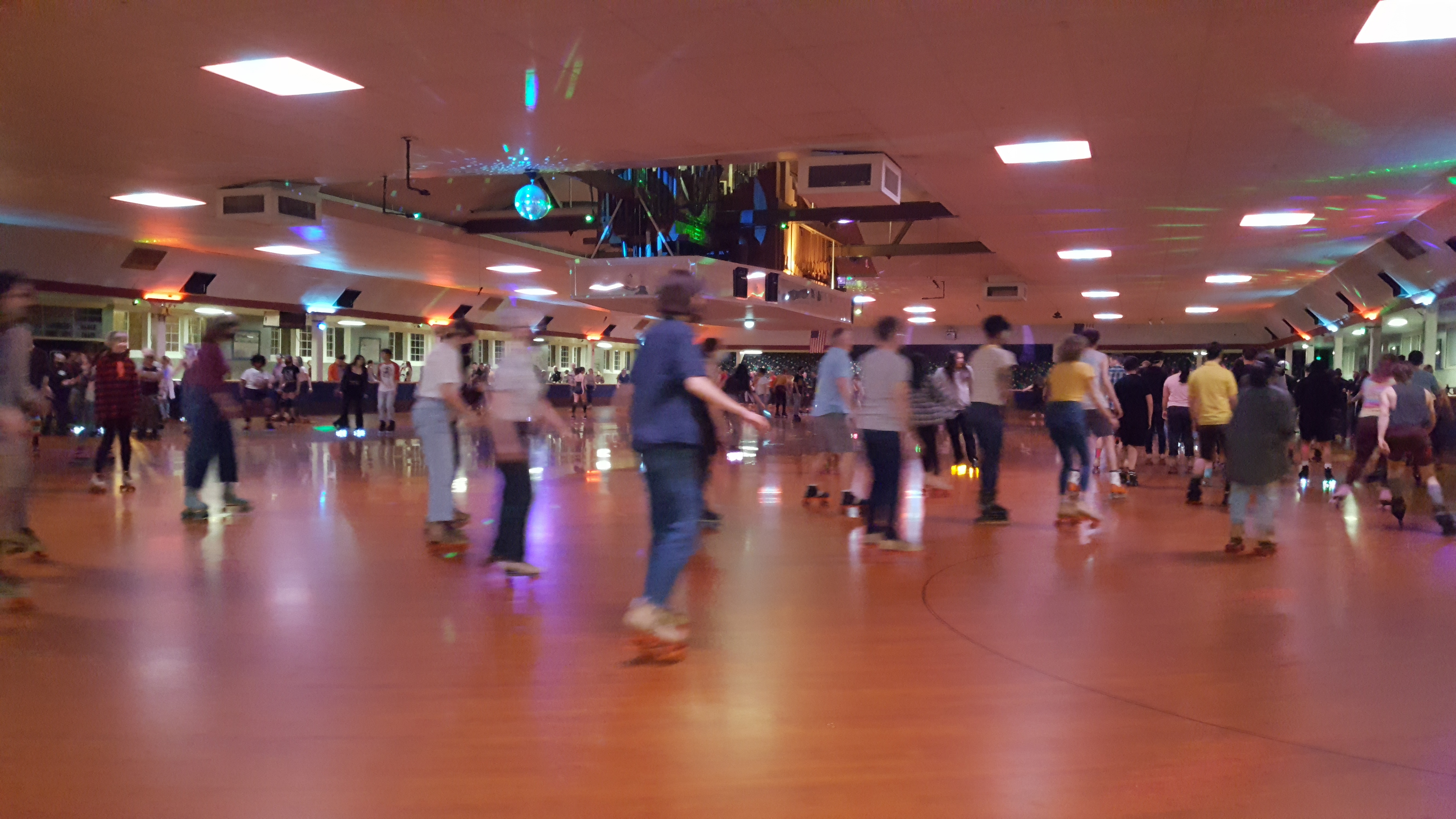
Gay Skate at Oaks Park Roller Skating Rink, 2022

Portland's annual pride parade is primarily organized by Pride Northwest. CAP Northwest (formerly Cascade AIDS Project) holds an annual AIDS Walk. Peacock in the Park is another annual event, running from 1987 to 2005, and, again, from 2014 to the present. The La Femme Magnifique International Pageant is an annual drag pageant. Oaks Park Roller Skating Rink has hosted Gay Skate monthly since 1991. "Hear You Loud and Queer" is a monthly comedy show. The city has hosted Gays Eating Garlic Bread in the Park. Q Center holds a variety of social events for LGBTQ people, including a monthly hiking event at the Hoyt Arboretum, a monthly chair yoga event, movie nights, cabaret performances, a sewing group, and a support group for people who are new to the queer community. Portland also has a chapter of Dykes on Bikes that meets regularly. The Lesbian Culture Club was initially established as a supper club, but now hosts watch parties, outdoor retreats, fitness classes, and pickleball tournaments.

=== Dance ===
Stomptown has been described by The Oregonian as "Portland's home for LGBTQ+ country-western dance" and by Portland Monthly as a recurring "queer country dance party". The event features line dancing and other types of partner dancing such as country-western two-step, swing, and waltz. In 2025, Chiara Profenna of The Oregonian said Stomptown had a "friendly, mixed-age crowd and lots of partner rotation". Profenna wrote, "Rotating partners is always optional if you come with your own partner. No partner is required to attend. The vibe was inclusive and welcoming, and most of the line dances were beginner-friendly."

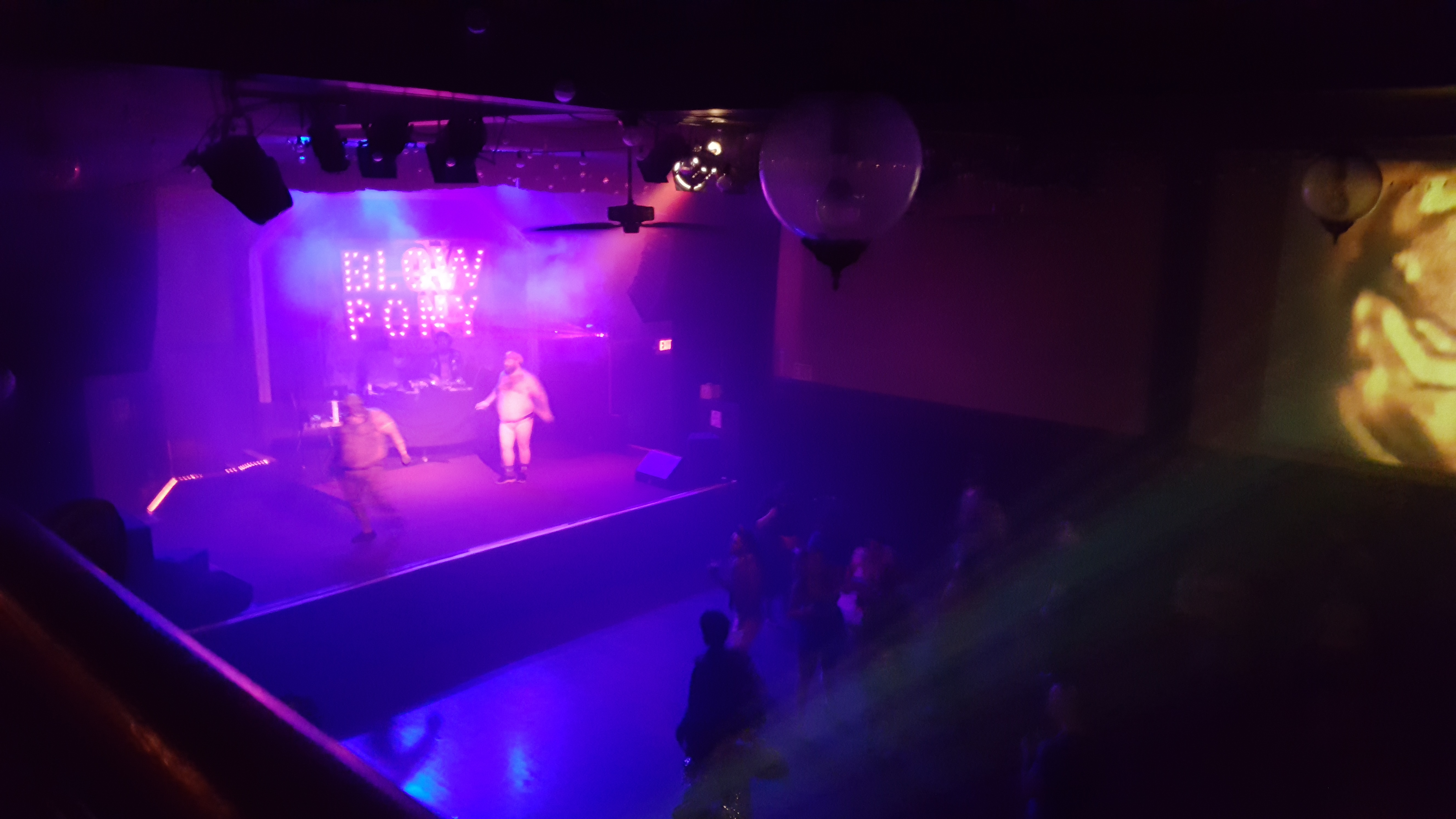
Blow Pony at Nova PDX, 2016

Other recurring LGBTQ dance events in Portland have included Bearracuda, Blow Pony, Club Kai Kai, Lumbertwink, and Pants Off Dance Off. All of these events experienced pauses upon the arrival of the COVID-19 pandemic. Monthly Blow Pony dances were established in Portland by Airick Redwolf in 2007. Inferno monthly dance parties hosted by Hot Flash Productions owner/operators DJ Wildfire (Jenn Davis) and Armida Hanlon that first began in Portland in 2004 and are now held regularly in Portland and Seattle. Willamette Week has described Lumbertwink as a "patio party celebrating the most Pacific Northwest brand of gay subculture—flannel-fetishizing gay dudes with hairy chests who may very well 'chop wood' in their downtime". The newspaper said of the event: "Chaps of all gender dispositions fall under the lumbertwink umbrella, so you won't be drinking exclusively with the man's man-loving 'masc for masc' crowd. This is a royal opportunity for you to knock back a few with a delicately specific sliver of the queer populace." The Portland Mercury has recommended, "If you love dancing and seeing cozy clothes on fuzzy bodies of all sizes, this is for you." Lumbertwink has been held at various venues, including the Funhouse Lounge, Star Theater, and the defunct Tonic Lounge. Pants Off Dance Off is a clothing-optional dance party; the event was held at Tonic Lounge, as of 2019. Rosetown Ramblers holds gender-neutral square dancing events.

Queer Baile provides free "nongendered, queer-centered dance classes," teaching cumbia and bachata.

== Visual arts ==
LGBTQ-focused art organizations in Portland include the t4t Art Collective, Uwu Collective, and Iridescent Daydream. Ori Gallery in Northeast Portland centers queer and trans artists of color. Brassworks Gallery has been described as a local "hub" for transgender artists.

Rupert Kinnard is a gay, Black cartoonist based in Portland who has published comic books featuring LGBTQ characters and has contributed art and creative direction to many local LGBTQ organizations during his career. Colleen Coover, a lesbian and comic book artist, is from Portland. Darren G. Davis is a gay comic book publisher and writer who runs a Portland-based comic book publishing company called TidalWave Productions.

Esther Godoy is a butch lesbian photographer based in Portland. She is the creator and editor of an Australian magazine called Butch Is Not a Dirty Word which highlights butch identity and is primarily geared toward an international audience but was originally inspired by Godoy's discovery of her own butchness after spending time with butch and queer women in Portland.

== Film and theatre ==
The Portland Queer Film Festival, formerly known as the Portland Lesbian & Gay Film Festival, has been running for more than 20 years and takes place at Cinema 21. The Portland Queer Documentary Film Festival screens LGBTQ documentaries. Queer Horror is a bi-monthly film festival that is shown at the Hollywood Theatre. Dan Savage's HUMP! film festival, which screens in Portland annually, showcases "diversity in orientations and identities, including straight, gay, lesbian, bisexual, trans, poly, genderqueer, and genderfluid perspectives", according to The Stranger.

OutWright Theatre Festival takes place in June and features LGBTQ-centered performances by local groups like Fuse Theatre Ensemble. Third Eye Theatre, described as "a Portland-based company dedicated to presenting work with LGBTQ+ themes and perspectives", runs an annual Portland Pride Play Festival.

== Music ==
The Portland Gay Men's Chorus (PGMC) was established in 1980, the Portland Lesbian Choir was established in 1986, and Portland's LGBTQ youth choir, Bridging Voices, was established in 2013. The Rose City Pride Bands often perform with each of the choirs individually, and in April 2025, all three choirs and the Rose City Pride Bands held a performance together to celebrate the 45th anniversary of the establishment of the PGMC.

Parts of Portland's punk scene have been an important center of queer culture since the 1980s. Portland has been home to queercore bands Team Dresch and Heatmiser, as well as Chainsaw Records, which started as a zine made by Donna Dresch and developed into a queercore record label in the 1990s. DIY shows are an important space for queer people who feel uncomfortable or alienated in more traditional LGBTQ venues and events, like bars, clubs, and mainstream concerts.

Other LGBTQ musicians and musical groups based in Portland include Katherine Paul (Black Belt Eagle Scout), Carrie Brownstein, Beth Ditto, Thomas Lauderdale, Storm Large, and "all-queer" brass band Brassless Chaps.

Rose City Guitar Company is a "queer women-owned" guitar shop and music school on Burnside.

== Sports ==
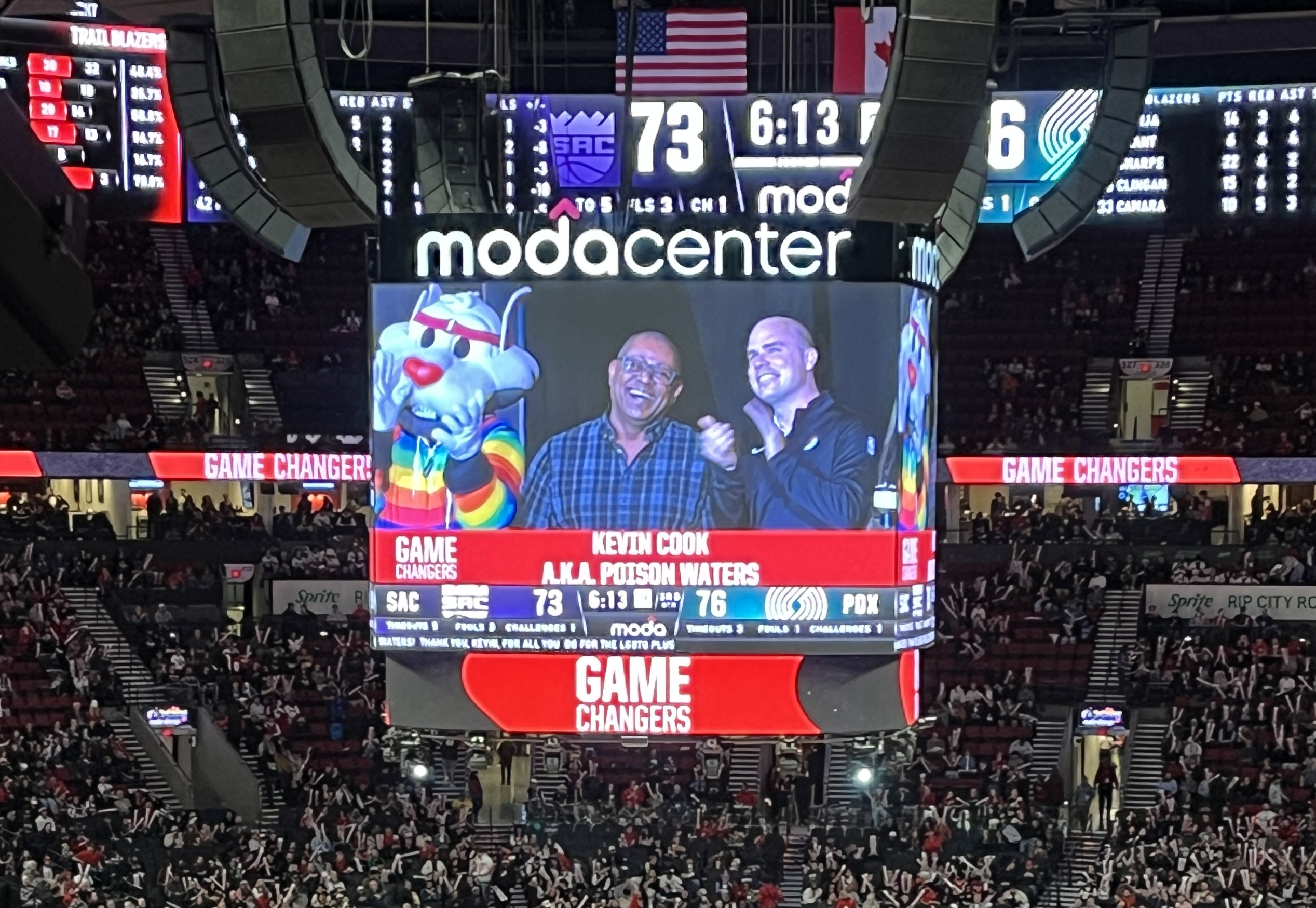
Activist and drag artist Poison Waters is celebrated at a Portland Trail Blazers game, 2025

Lavender League is a Portland-based soccer league for queer women and nonbinary or trans people, with over 200 members as of 2025. Bump, Set, Dyke is a lesbian volleyball team in Portland. The city is also home to the Oregon Alliance Flag Football League. The Portland Lumberjacks are the city's LGBTQ rugby team. Portland hosted the Gay Softball World Series in 2002 and 2017.

In 2013, the Portland Trail Blazers, the Portland Timbers, and the Portland Thorns became the first major U.S. professional sports organizations to officially endorse same-sex marriage. All three teams host Pride Nights annually. The Timbers Army recognizes LGBTQ Pride Month annually and creates LGBTQ-themed tifos. One rainbow tifo in 2016 read, "Love is a human experience, not a political statement". In 2019, a group unveiled a tifo with the text "For pride, for equality, for unity, for love, for human rights, Timbers Army stands for all." A tifo in 2022 said, "From Stonewall a brick, and Portland an axe, respect our pride or expect our wrath".

In October 2025, Portland hosted the T Boy Wrestling showcase featuring transgender men and nonbinary people from Oregon. The event was described as "one of the local LGBTQ+ community’s buzziest events of the year". The House of Danger Queer Wrestling Variety Show is a queer wrestling circuit based in Portland.

== LGBTQ establishments and LGBTQ-owned businesses ==
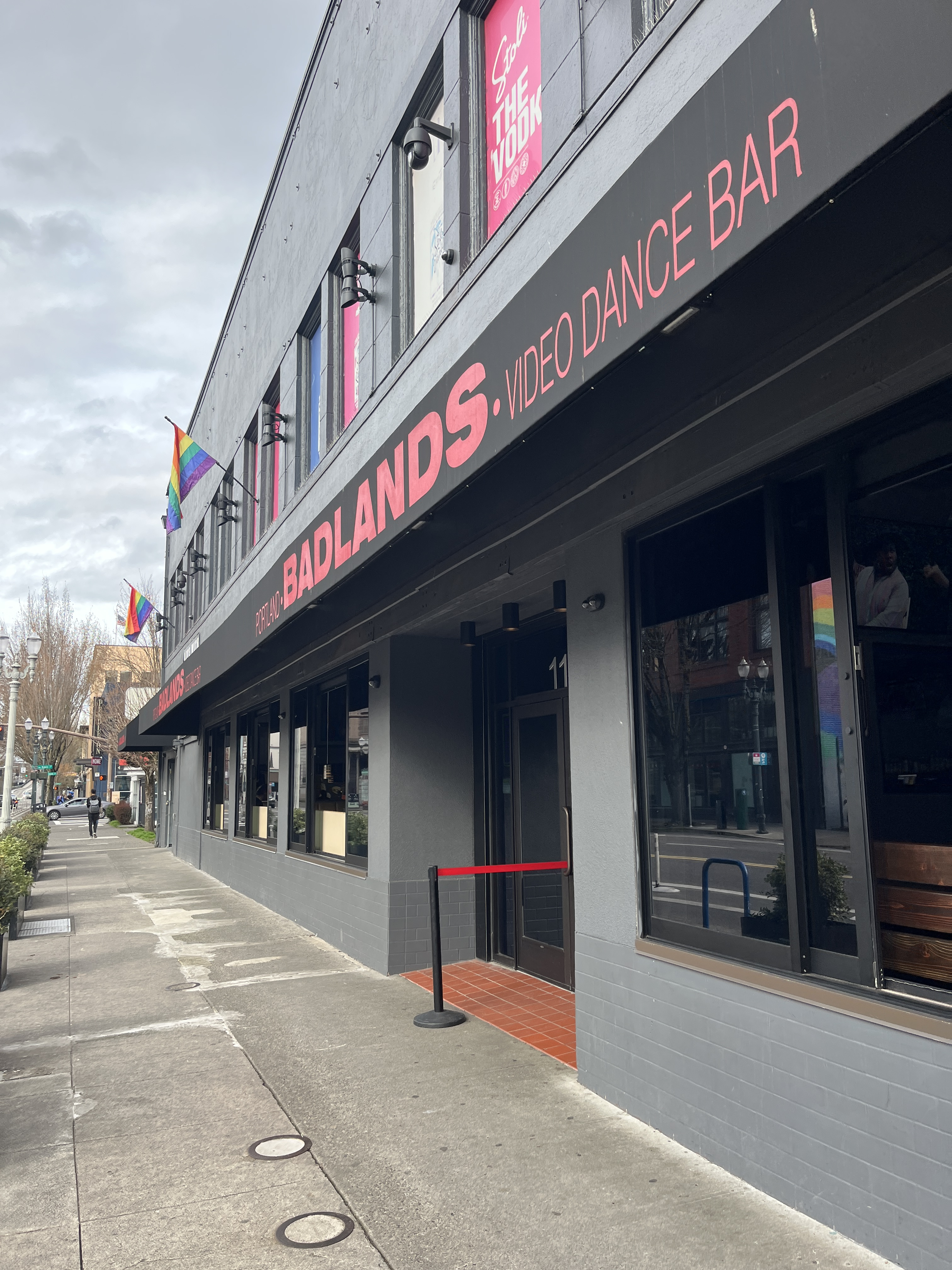
Badlands Portland

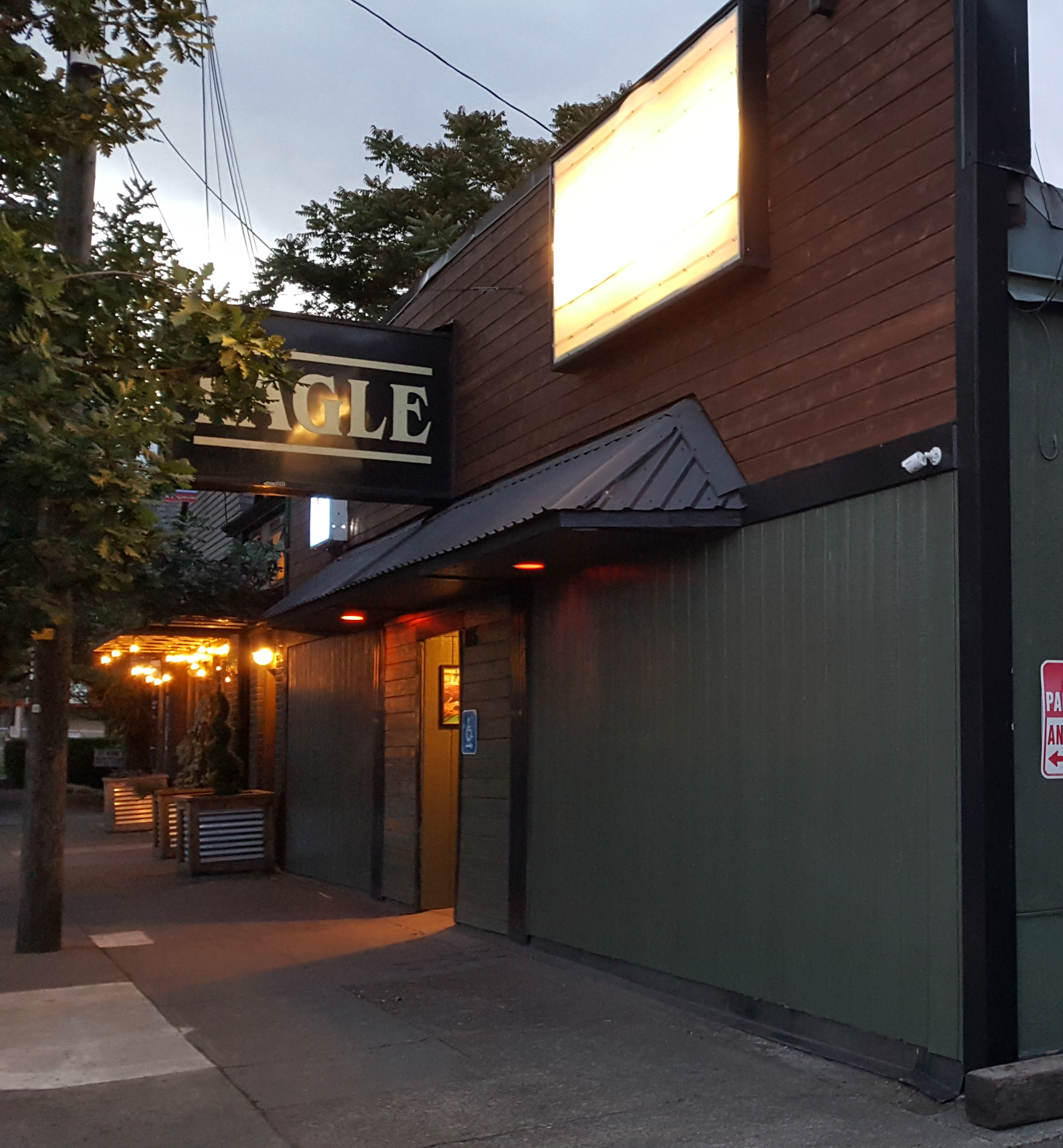
Eagle Portland

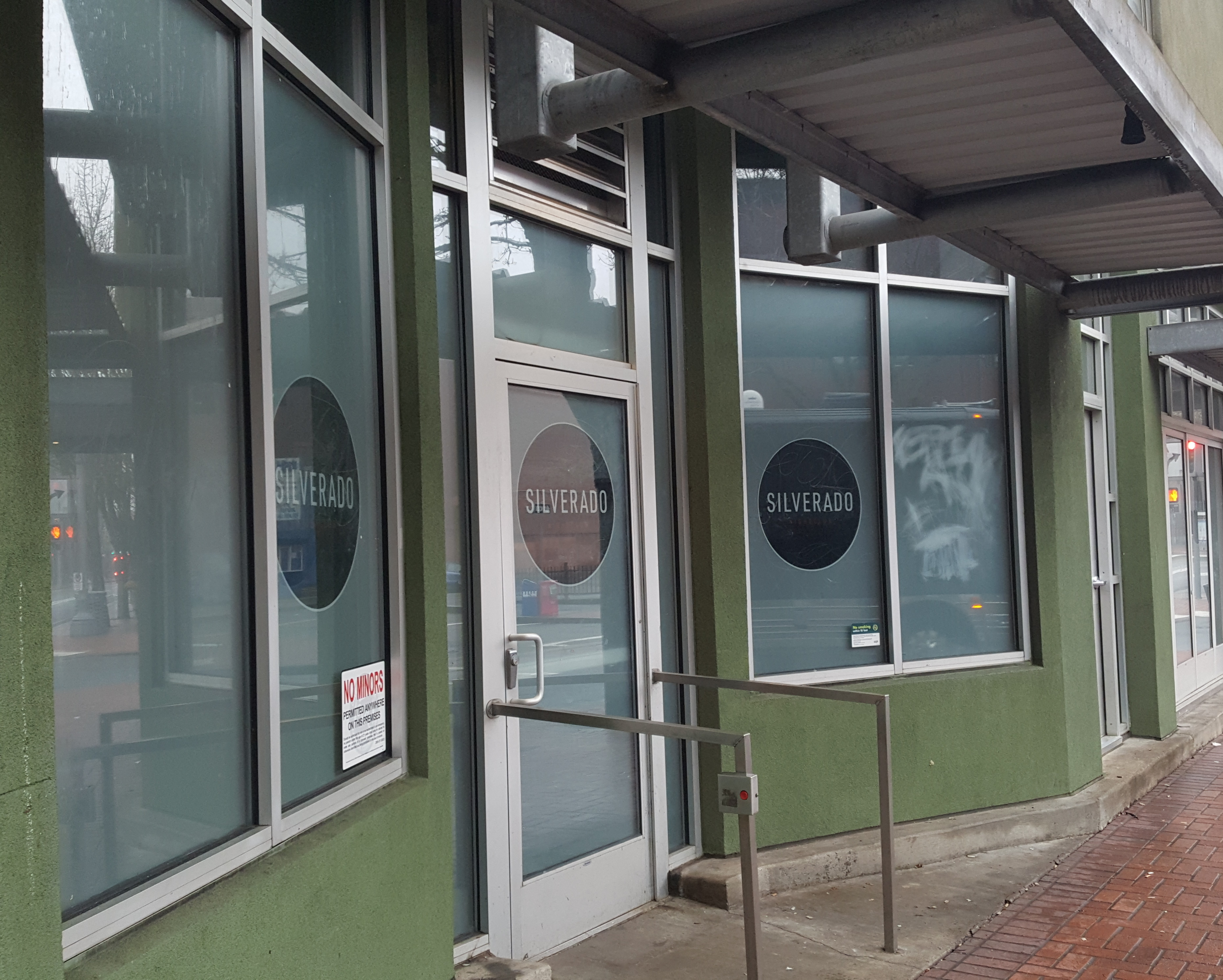
Silverado

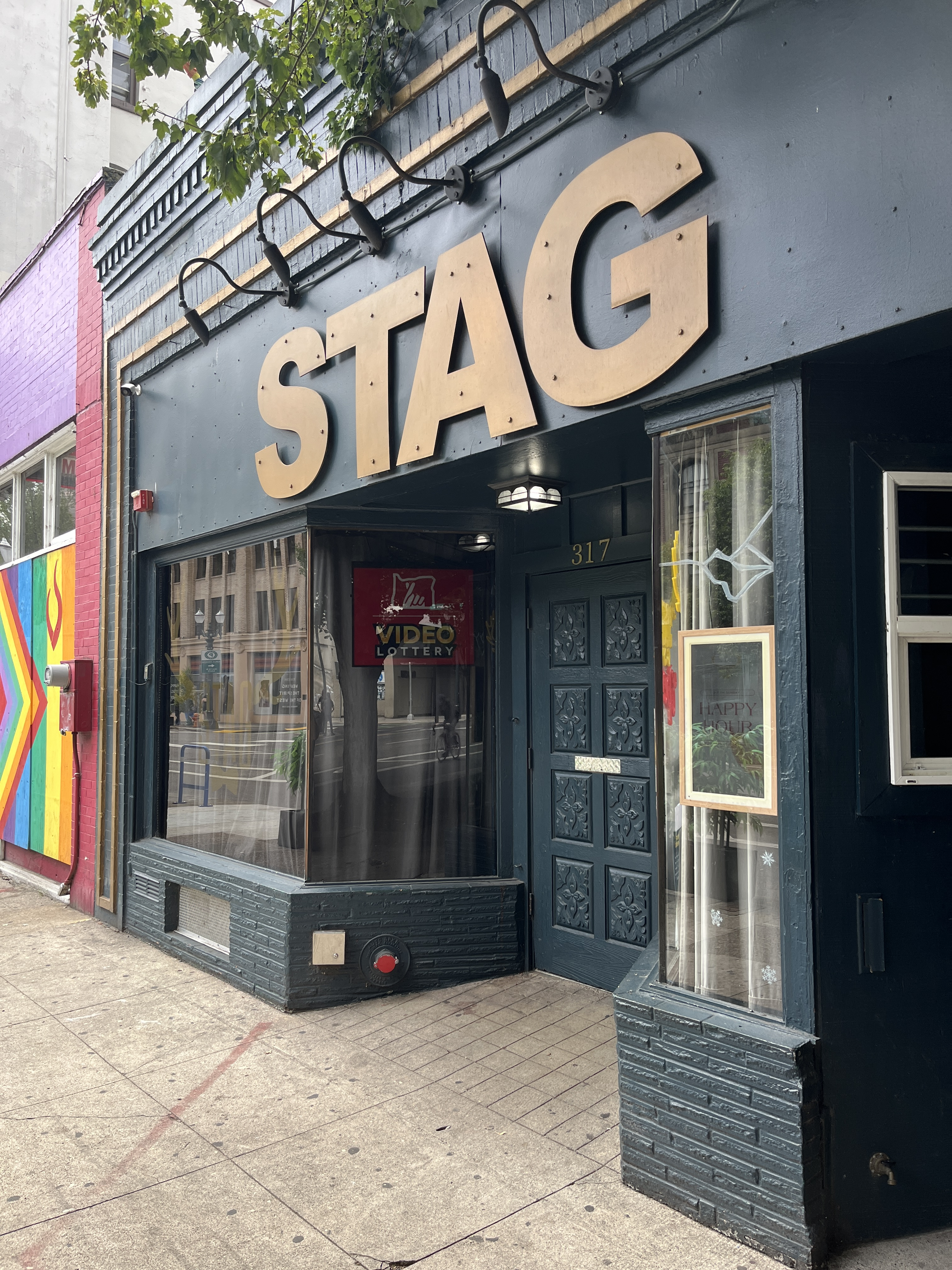
Stag PDX

Currently operating LGBTQ drinking establishments and nightclubs include: Badlands Portland (2024), CC Slaughters, Eagle Portland, Scandals (1979), Silverado, and Stag PDX (2015). Silverado and Stag are also strip clubs, along with Fuzzy Navels. Back 2 Earth opened in 2023. Coffin Club (formerly Lovecraft Bar) has also been described as an LGBTQ-friendly bar. The Sports Bra, established in 2022, is LGBTQ-owned and is the only sports bar in the world that only plays women's sports. Rebel Rebel is in Old Town Chinatown. Gay bathhouses operating in Portland include Hawks PDX (since 2012) and Steam Portland (since 2003).

The drag venue Darcelle XV Showplace was established by Darcelle XV in 1967 and continues to host shows regularly. Queer-owned restaurants include Cheese & Crack Snack Shop (established 2012), Jade Rabbit, Either/Or, Mis Tacones (established as a pop-up in 2016, relocated to a brick and mortar space in 2022), and Taqueria Los Puñales (established 2020). Triumph Coffee is not queer-owned, but is a queer-friendly venue frequented by Radical Faeries. Wildfang is a Portland-based, queer-friendly apparel company, and Under U 4 Men is a gay-owned men's underwear company that primarily caters to gay men.

=== Defunct ===
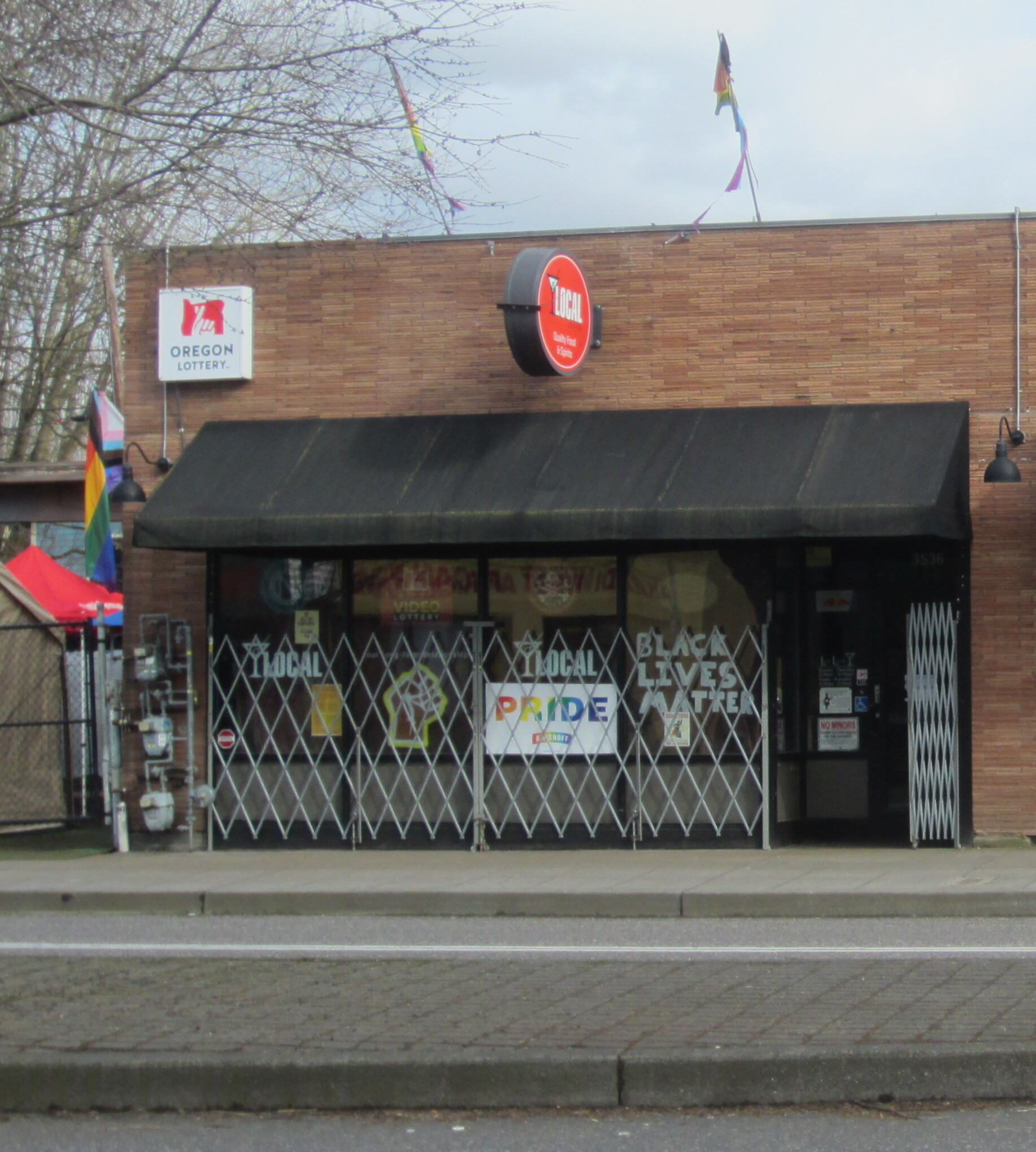
Local Lounge

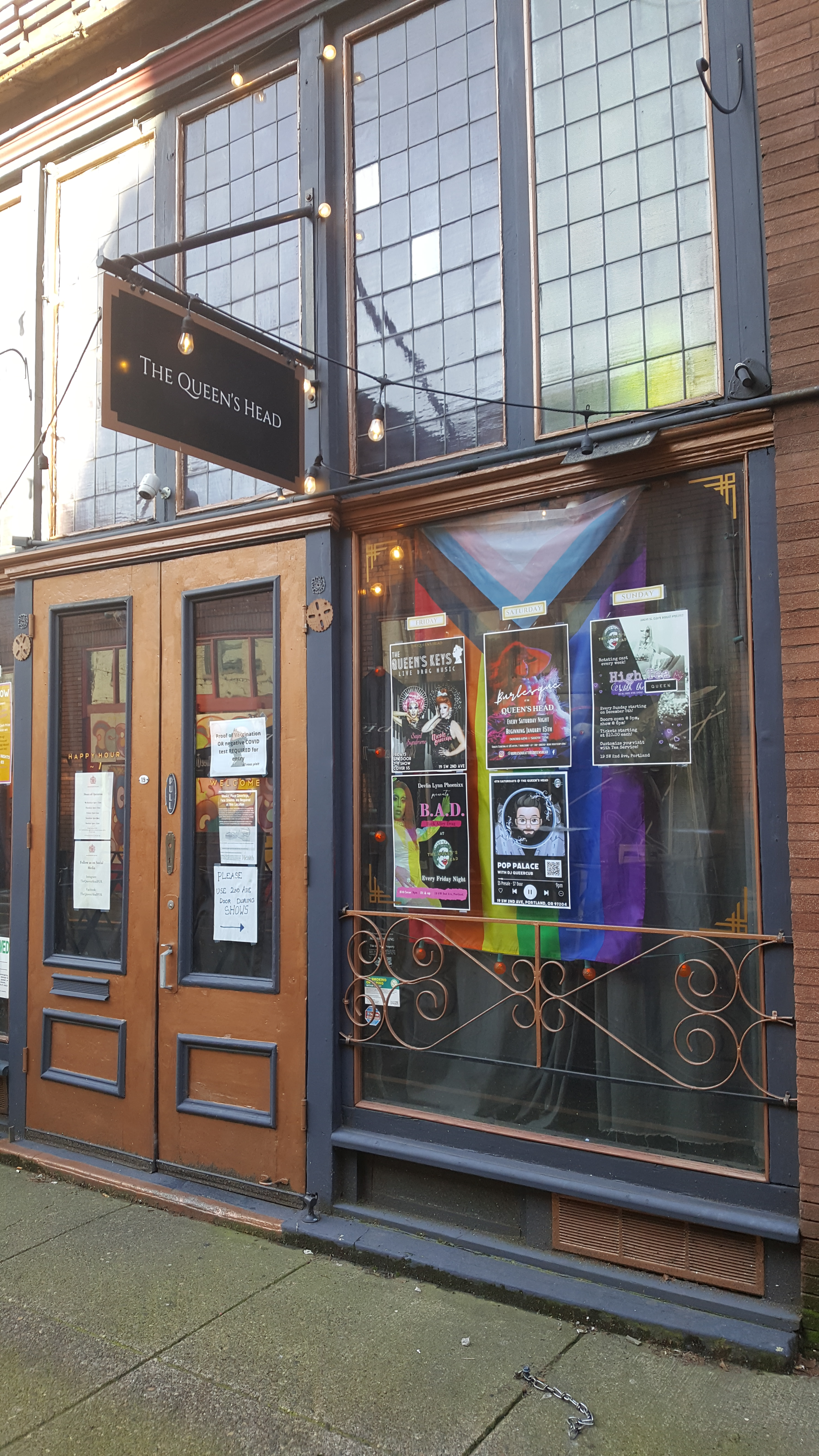
The Queen's Head

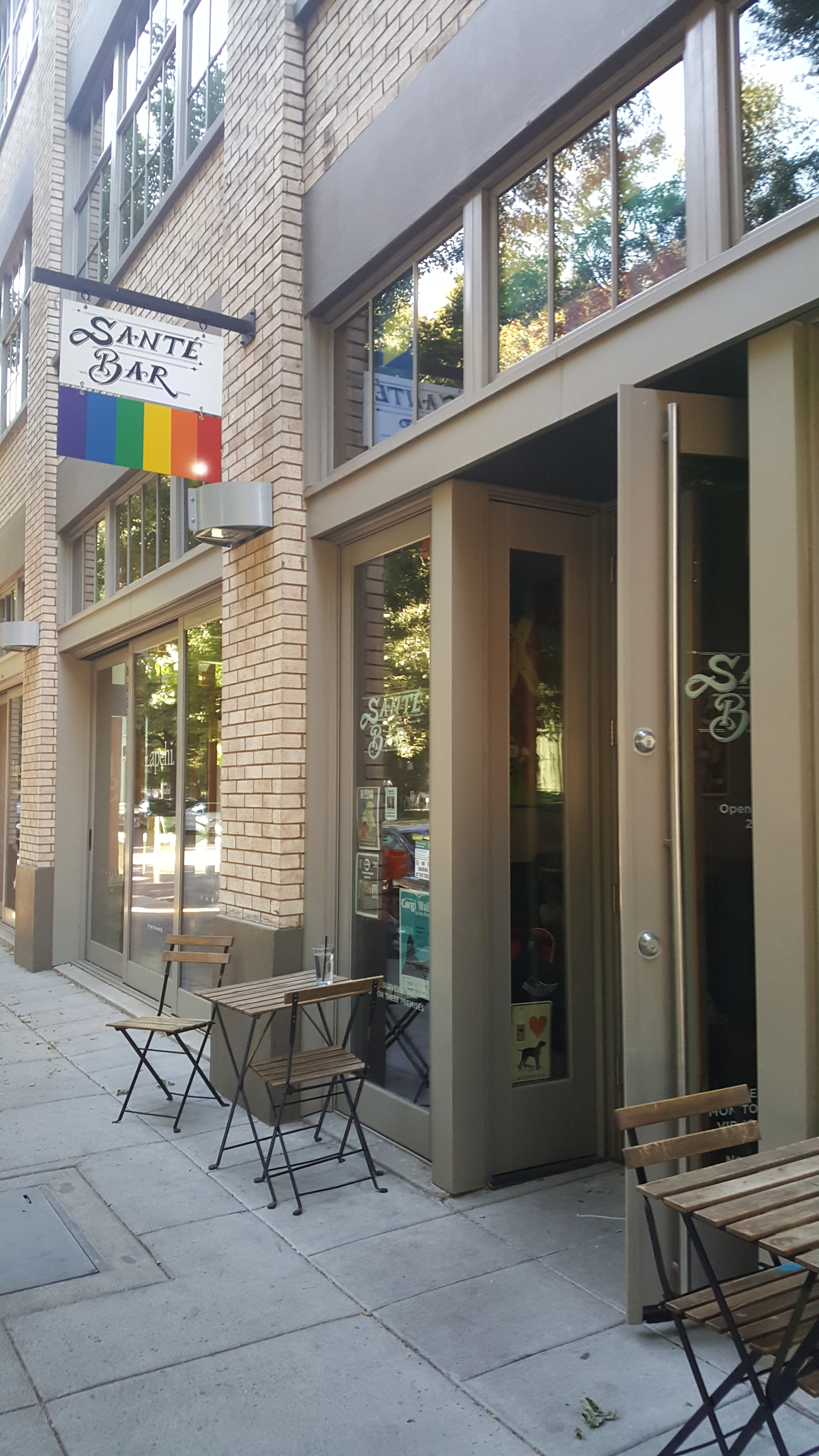
Santé Bar

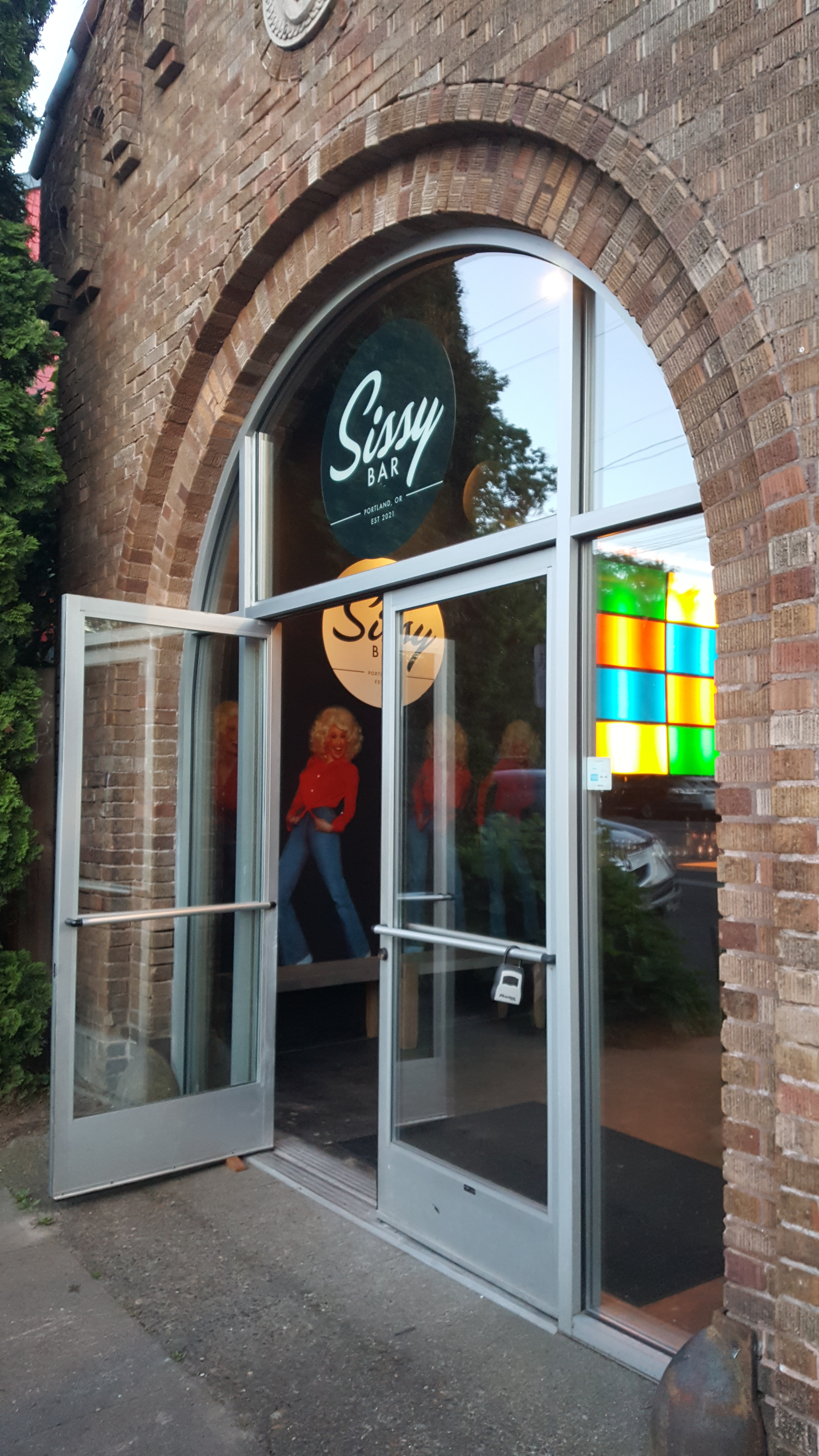
Sissy Bar

Defunct establishments include Crush Bar (2001–2024), Egyptian Club (1995–2010), Gail's Dirty Duck Tavern, Red Cap Garage (1987–2012), Santé Bar, Starky's, and Three Sisters Tavern (1964–2004), which was also a strip club. The gay bathhouse Club Portland closed in 2007. Embers Avenue (established during the 1970s) and Escape Nightclub both closed in 2017.

The City Nightclub, an all ages drug and alcohol free gay and lesbian nightclub, was established in 1983 by Lanny Swerdlow. According to author Linnea Due, it was the only all ages gay and lesbian club in the United States. An attempt by the Portland Police Bureau in 1996 to shut down the club sparked a demonstration which was covered on MTV News: Unfiltered. Ultimately, the club closed in 1997.

During the COVID-19 pandemic, Hobo's and Local Lounge closed in 2020 and 2021, respectively. In late 2021, Daniel Bund opened The Queen's Head, an English-style pub and lounge hosting drag shows and burlesque performances frequently. The bar closed in 2022. Sissy Bar operated from 2022 to 2024. 2022 also saw the opening of the lesbian bar Doc Marie's, which closed permanently in 2025. Misfits Bar and Lounge, which closed in 2025, was described as a "laidback queer hangout".

The Roxy was an LGBTQ-friendly diner along Southwest Harvey Milk Street. The restaurant initially opened in 1977, then closed from 1988 to 1993, reopened in 1994, and closed again in March 2022. Sullivan's Gulch Bar & Grill (formerly known as Joq's Tavern, or simply Joq's) has also been described as an LGBTQ establishment. Shine Distillery and Grill, which opened in 2019 and closed in 2023, (Note: The restaurant part closed; it is still open as a distillery.) was a gay bar and restaurant that hosted drive-through drag shows during the COVID-19 pandemic.

==== Barbarella ====
Barbarella
- Logo

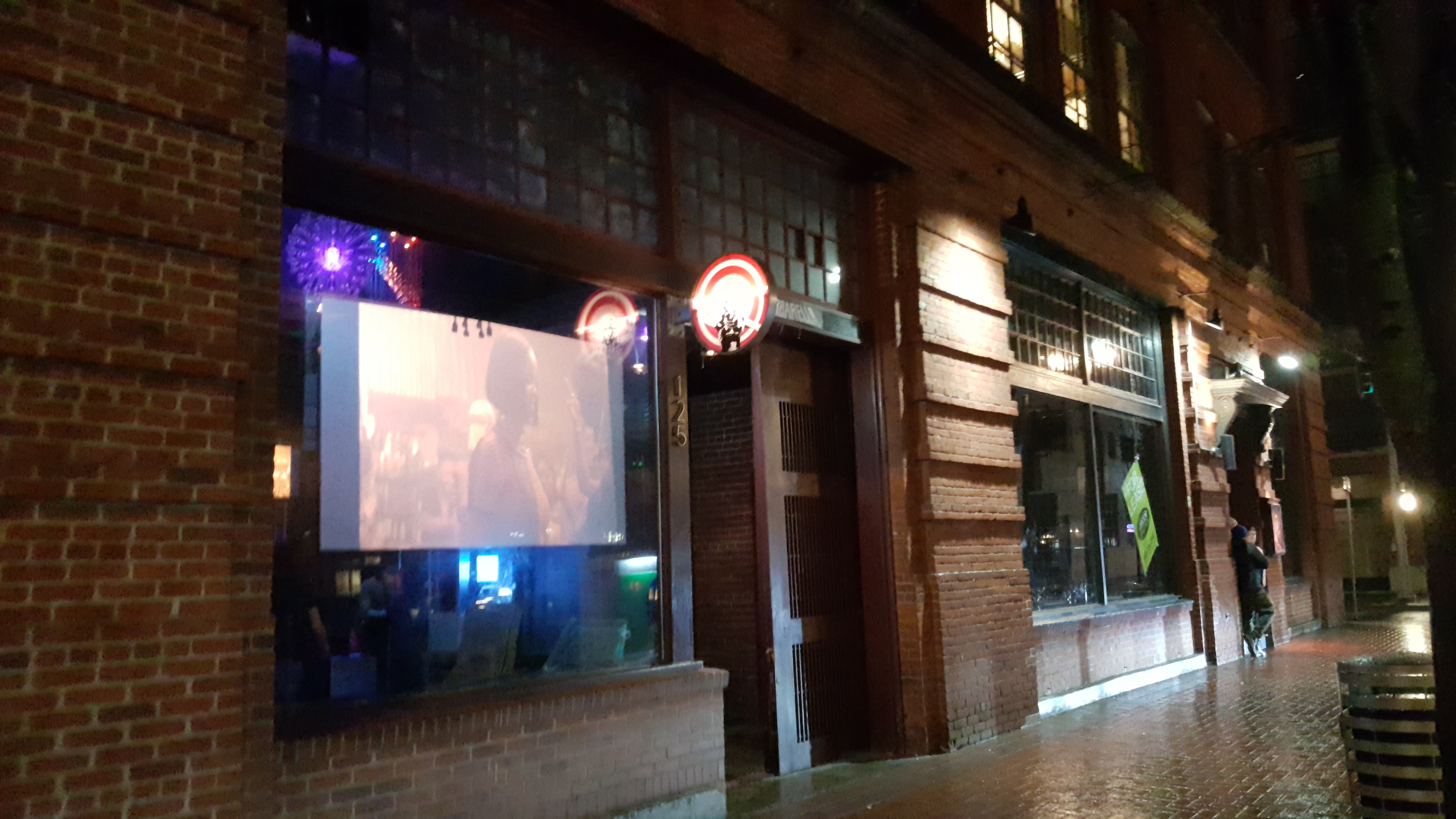
- The nightclub's exterior in 2020
- Address: 125 Northwest 5th Avenue
- Location: Portland, Oregon, United States

Construction
- Opened: February 14, 2019

Located at Northwest 5th Avenue and Davis Street in Old Town Chinatown, Barbarella (sometimes called Barbarella PDX) was a nightclub in a building which previously housed a "grimy" music venue called Someday Lounge, followed by the Las Vegas-inspired Fifth Avenue Lounge. The bar was part of a chain of nightclubs based in Austin, Texas. Andrew Jankowski of Willamette Week described Barbarella as "a dance club with dirt-cheap drinks, themed parties running from the '50s through the '80s and an overall vibe best described as 'a straight person's idea of a gay bar'". He compared the bar to neighboring amusement arcade Ground Kontrol, but without the video games, and said, "Barbarella's aesthetic is as delightfully kitschy and low-budget as a bar named after a campy sci-fi cult classic should be." Jankowski wrote:

On paper, Barbarella should be a sensation, particularly with central eastsiders who rarely deign to cross the river into the Old Town entertainment district. Sure, the lack of specialty drinks feels like a missed opportunity, and even the bartender recommended against ordering food. But with no cover charge and wells at or below $2 each, you'd imagine the place would be packed with people headed to or from the arcade bar, the gay strip club or the scores of other party spots in the neighborhood.

Daily Xtra described Barbarella as a "video/dance dive bar" with dance parties, disc jockeys, and queer events in its 2019 overview of "gay Portland". The venue had two dance floors and a loft. The interior featured lava lamps, pinball machines, and mid-century modern furniture. There was a painting of a topless woman on one wall, as well as two "tributes" to Jane Fonda, who starred in the 1968 science fiction film Barbarella. According to Jankowski, "The only 21st-century features are the video projections and gently rippling rainbow LED lights behind the pre-existing sheet-metal grates."

Barbarella opened on February 14 (Valentine's Day), 2019, and closed during the COVID-19 pandemic. The venue had hosted Mac DeMarco.

== Drag ==
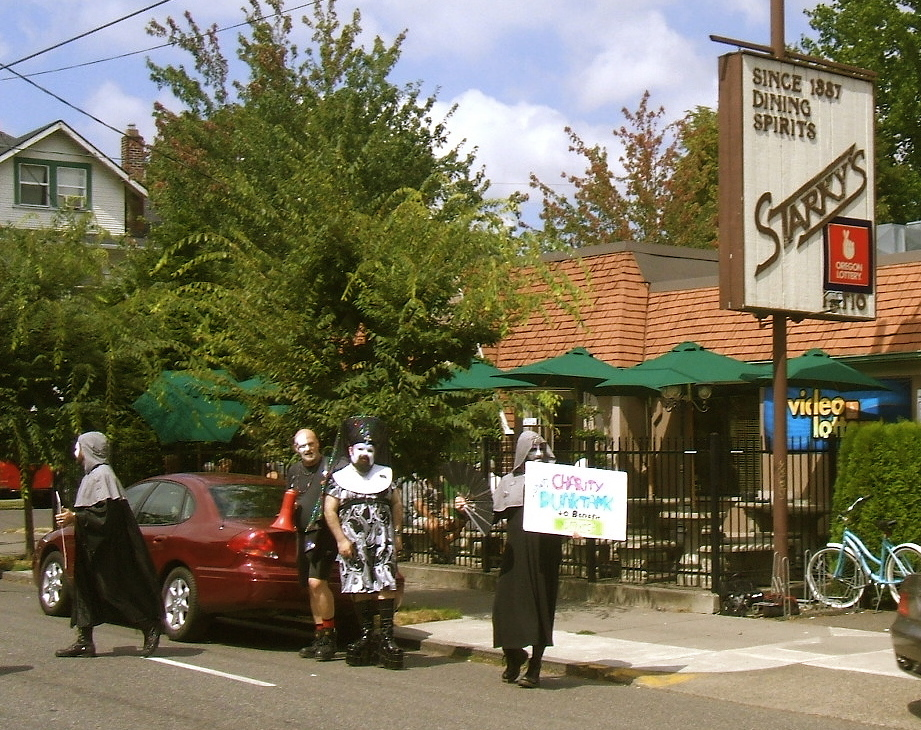
Portland Sisters of Perpetual Indulgence outside Starky's in 2009

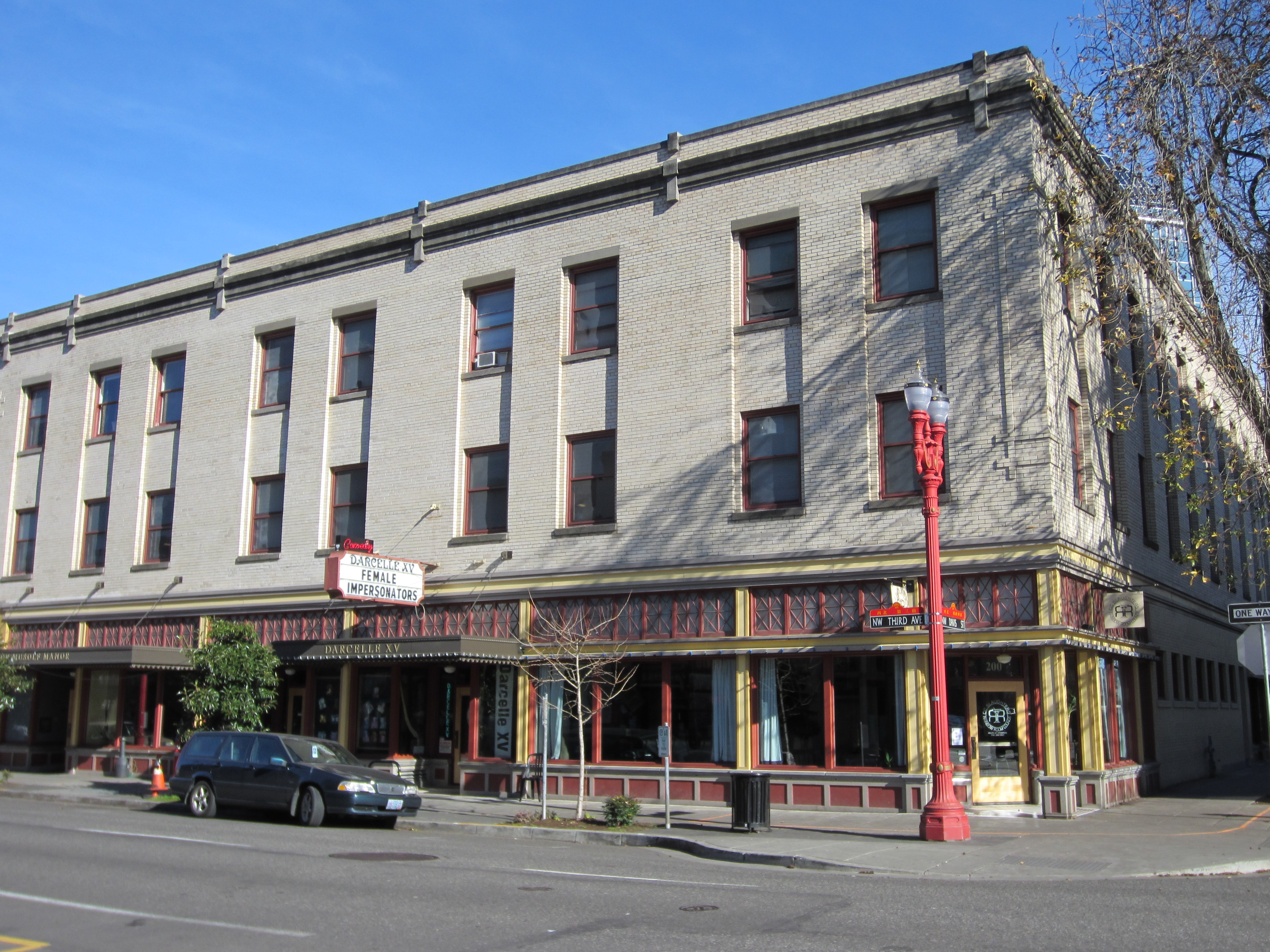
Entrances to Darcelle XV Showplace and CC Slaughters, 2012

In addition to Darcelle XV, drag performers from Portland include Alexis Campbell Starr, Asia Consent, Bolivia Carmichaels, Carla Rossi, Coco Jem Holiday, Flawless Shade, Isaiah Esquire, James Majesty, Lulu Luscious, Mars, Nicole Onoscopi, Pepper Pepper, and Poison Waters. Portland is home to a historic drag family which began with Pebbles Campbell Starr and now includes T’Kara Campbell Starr, Alexis Campbell Starr and her husband Arcadian, and five other drag performers.

Drag Me Outside is a hiking group led by environmental scientists who are drag performers. The community market and garage sale 'Drag Out the Closet!' was held in 2026.

The Order of Perpetual Bliss, Portland's chapter of the Sisters of Perpetual Indulgence, is involved with the pride parade, puts on various LGBTQ community events, and works with the Multnomah County Health Department to provide HIV testing and sex education. Members are called Sisters, and they are known for their signature drag outfits inspired by Catholic religious attire, especially nun habits. Sister Irma Geddon has said, "The lightness of everything, in addition to the whiteface and the nun's habits, are a mechanism to reach out to people, [...] When we're dressed up like that, kind of like sacred clowns, it allows people to interact with us."

== Organizations ==
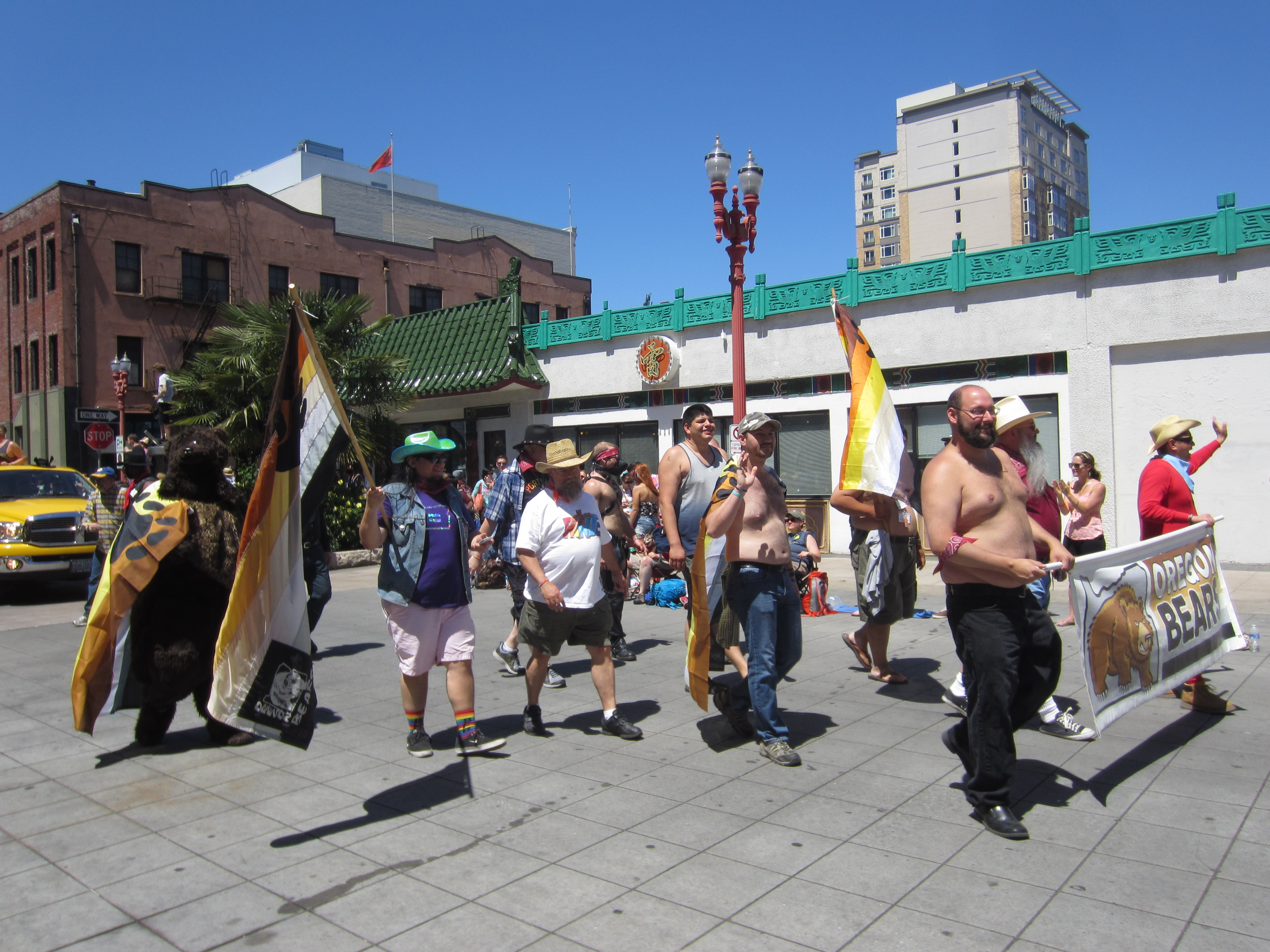
Oregon Bears representation at the Portland pride parade, 2015

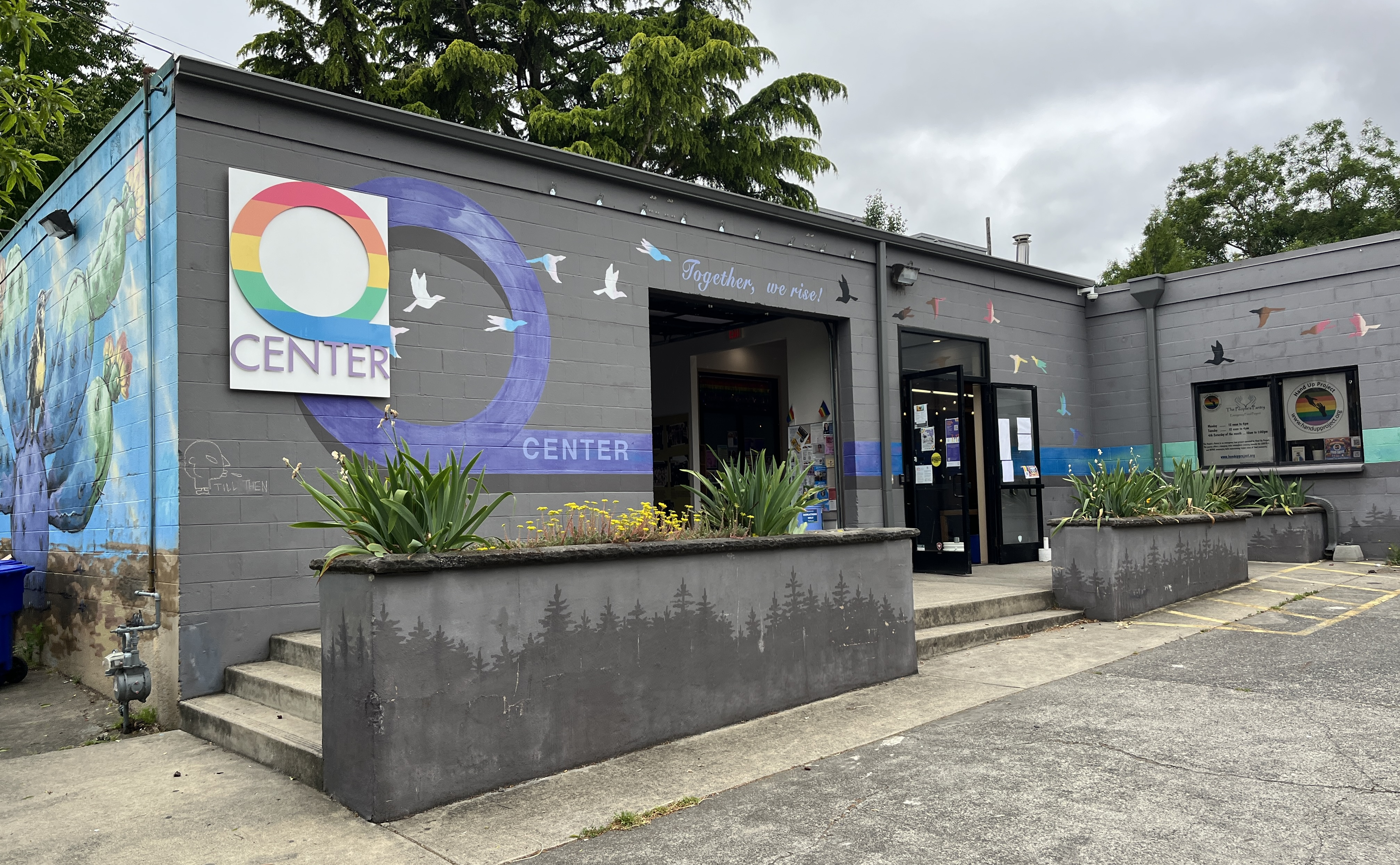
Exterior of the Q Center, 2025

LGBTQ rights organization Basic Rights Oregon is based in Portland. Local LGBTQ-oriented organizations include CAP Northwest, Q Center, and Bradley Angle which offers LGBTQ domestic violence services. Pride Northwest organizes the annual pride parade and festival.

New Avenues for Youth (est. 1997), Outside In, and the Sexual & Gender Minority Youth Resource Center (SMYRC) are nonprofit organizations that provide services and resources for LGBTQ youth who are homeless or at risk of homelessness.

Other local LGBTQ organizations include:

- Amazon Dragons, a lesbian competitive dragon boat team founded in 1992
- A Woman's Place bookstore
- Black Lesbians and Gays United
- Dykes on Bikes PDX
- Equity Foundation (merged with Pride Foundation)
- In Other Words Feminist Community Center
- Lesbian Community Project (1986–2008)
- Love Makes a Family (1992–?), closed
- Metropolitan Community Church of Portland
- Northwest Gender Alliance
- Oregon Bears
- Oregon Queer History Collective (Note: Formerly known as the Gay and Lesbian Archives of the Pacific Northwest)
- Portland Association of Gay Equality
- Radical Abundance, nonprofit thrift store
- Right to Privacy / Right to Pride
- Rose City Pride Bands
- Second Foundation
- Order of Perpetual Bliss (local chapter of the Sisters of Perpetual Indulgence)

== Literature ==
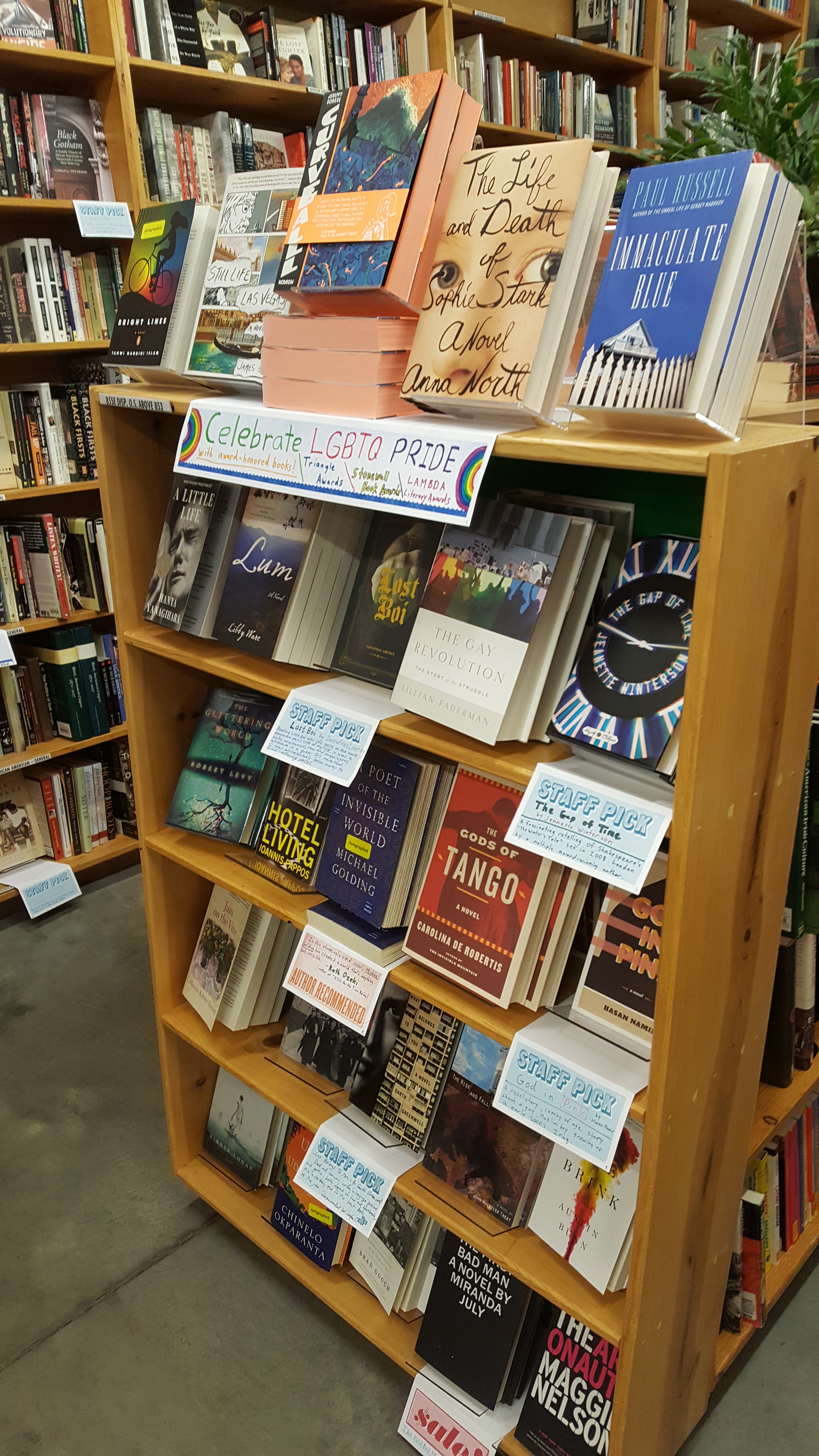
Pride section at Powell's Books, 2016

Powell's Books has sections dedicated to LGBTQ literature. The Always Here Bookstore is a queer-owned bookstore that has been described by Publishers Weekly as "an indie pop-up" that is "a haven for bibliophiles" and "a welcoming space for queer, trans, Latinx, and neurodivergent people of all ages". Field Day Books & Bottles is a bookstore that also offers alcohol and a reading space; the business "places a particular emphasis on LGBTQ, BIPOC and neurodiverse perspectives" and stocks local creators' works. Incite: Queer Writers Read is an annual event for LGBTQ writers to read their works to an audience.

=== Publications ===
Shoutout is the only active LGBTQ-focused news publication based in Portland. Sus is another LGBTQ publication distributed in Portland, although it is based in Bend. Defunct LGBTQ publications include the Alternative Connection, Cascade Voice (later renamed the Eagle), the Fountain (which was the first LGBTQ-focused publication in Oregon), Gertrude Press, Just Out, NW Gay Review, the Oregon Gay Rights Report, and PQ Monthly.

The Willamette Bridge was a counter-culture magazine based in Portland, and while it was not an LGBTQ-focused publication, it was one of the first public platforms for LGBTQ social and political organizing in the 1970s due to the advocacy of some of its LGBTQ employees.

== See also ==
- Culture of Portland, Oregon
- LGBTQ culture in Eugene, Oregon
- LGBTQ culture in Seattle
- LGBTQ rights in Oregon
- List of LGBTQ people from Portland, Oregon
