= Pepper Pepper =

Drag queen and performance artist

- Born: 1984 or 1985 (age 40–41)
- Other names: Kaj-anne Pepper

Pepper Pepper, also known as Kaj-anne Pepper, is a drag queen, performance artist, and choreographer based in Portland, Oregon.

== Career ==
In 2015, Pepper Pepper hosted an event at Mississippi Studios in conjunction with Pride Month called 'MRS. Pride Queen', which was described as a "celebration of queer nightlife, queens of all genders and non-genders, and body positivity". Pepper Pepper hosted Drag Queen Tag Team monthly at Alberta Street Pub, as of 2019. Pepper Pepper's show Diva Practice toured in eight US states and received an award from the Oregon Arts Commission. Pepper Pepper organized the Critical Mascara drag ball for Portland's Time-Based Art Festival.

In 2017, Pepper Pepper debuted an interactive, outdoor sound installation. They described the work as "a staged feedback loop for participants to practice drag, lip-sync" for the purpose of creating "kaleidoscopic transformations".

== Personal life ==
Pepper Pepper has lived in Portland since 2005.

== See also ==
- LGBTQ culture in Portland, Oregon
- List of drag queens
- List of people from Portland, Oregon
