= Coffin Club =

Bar in Portland, Oregon, U.S.

- Logo

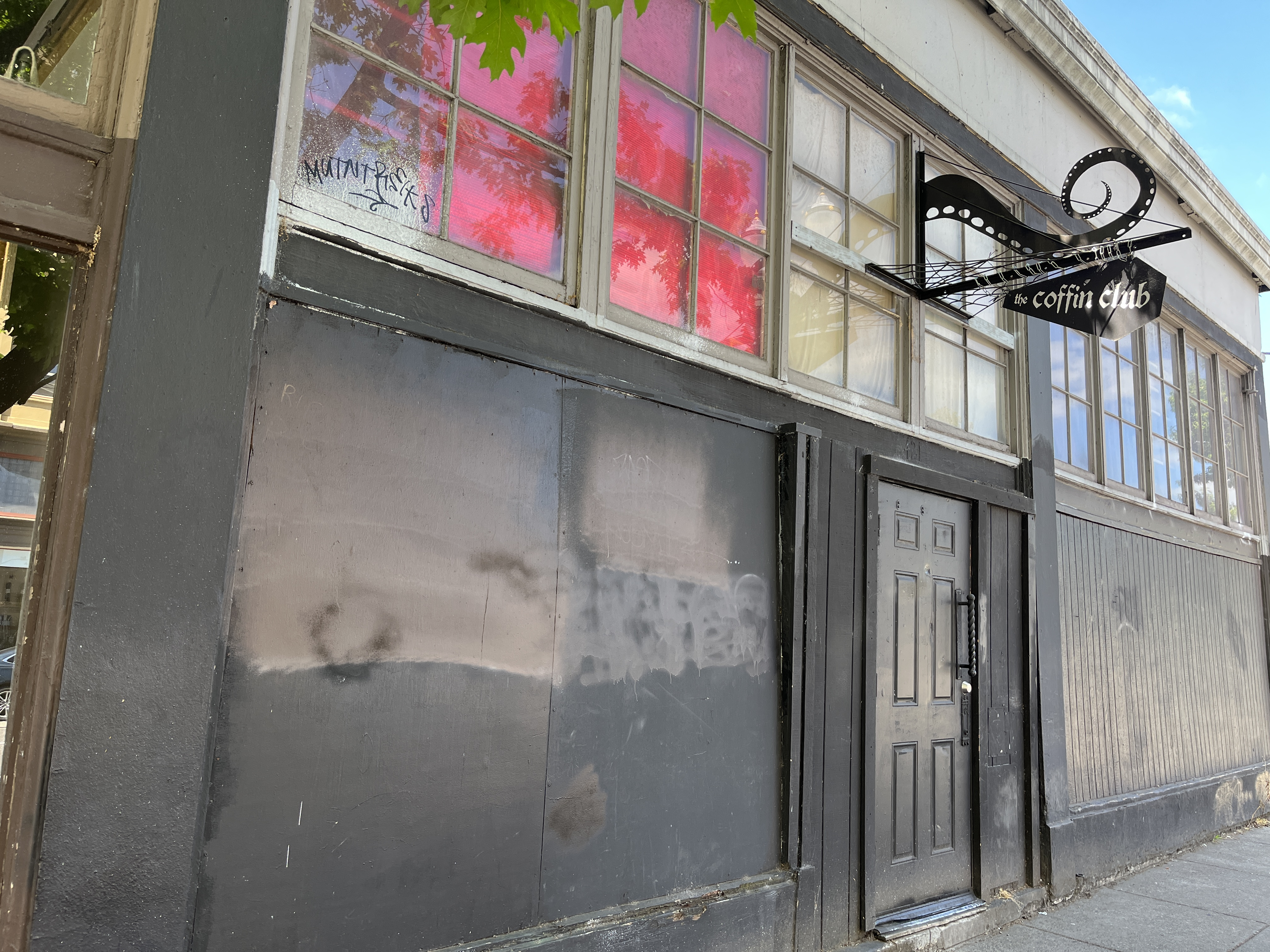
- The bar's exterior, 2022
- Interactive map of Coffin Club
- Former names: Lovecraft Bar
- Address: 421 Southeast Grand Avenue; Portland, Oregon; United States
- Coordinates: 45.5199°N 122.6609°W

Construction
- Opened: January 1, 2011

Website
- thecoffinclubpdx.com

The Coffin Club, formerly Lovecraft Bar, is a horror-themed, LGBTQ-friendly bar in Portland, Oregon, United States.

== Description and history ==
Coffin Club was previously known as Lovecraft Bar, named after H. P. Lovecraft. The horror-themed bar often hosts LGBTQ events and has been described as the city's "best known goth nightclub". In 2017, Food & Wine said the bar is "decorated as such with skulls, tentacles, a coffin, and, of course, images of pulp horror master, H.P. Lovecraft. Expect burlesque shows, tarot readings, horror movie nights, lots of goth and new wave music and plenty of fog." In 2018, Shannon Gormley of Willamette Week wrote,

Windowless and cavernous, Lovecraft was basically designed for sulking in corners. The raised, dark booths around the dance floor each feel like their own dark cave, and there's two vampiric backrooms. The horror-themed bar hosts kink-themed DJ nights and goth-themed burlesque, and just about all of it is shrouded in fog. The farther back you go, the weirder Lovecraft gets. Just off the pentagram-adorned dance floor is a room with a coffin and Cthulhu monster posters. Behind that, there's the recently added "Expansion." Only open after 10 pm, the small room looks like the inside of a Tim Burton movie—maybe because of the creepy burlap puppet with sewn-on x's for eyes that's the size of a toddler.

In 2019, the newspaper said, "Modeled after the imagery of the famously problematic early 20th century horror writer, the Lovecraft is a testament to old-school Portland subcultures and gothy nostalgia. Decked out in horror iconography and glowing pentagrams, the club hosts nightly dance parties and live music, as well as the occasional burlesque show. Even for normcores, it's one of the most fun dance halls in town."

Thrillist's Pete Cottell wrote, "The Lovecraft is about as on-the-nose as it gets when it comes to goth aesthetics. It's a shadowy, smoky fantasyland for diehards and scenesters alike, and the majority of their events revolve around the tangled web of microgenres that all find common roots in post-punk and new wave. We can't predict what the next big thing will be when the coldwave revival goes bust, but you can count on the Lovecraft to devote an entire night to it that will be at capacity by midnight no matter what."

== History ==
Coffin Club opened as Lovecraft Bar on January 1, 2011. The business announced an expansion in 2016.

== Reception ==
The Oregonian included Lovecraft in a 2012 list of "six bars that just might be the oddest nightspots around Portland". Coffin Club was a runner-up in the Best Place to Dance category of Willamette Week's annual 'Best of Portland' readers' poll in 2024. It was a finalist in the same category in 2025 and 2026.

== See also ==
- LGBTQ culture in Portland, Oregon
