= Oregon Queer History Collective =

Nonprofit organization in Oregon, U.S.

- The organization's logo
- Abbreviation: OQHC
- Formation: 1994; 32 years ago
- Founded at: Portland, Oregon, U.S.
- Type: Nonprofit
- Region served: Pacific Northwest
- Formerly called: Gay and Lesbian Archives of the Pacific Northwest (GLAPN)

The Oregon Queer History Collective (OQHC), formerly known as the Gay and Lesbian Archives of the Pacific Northwest (GLAPN), is an Oregon-based nonprofit dedicated to uncovering the history of the LGBTQ community in Oregon and the Pacific Northwest at large. Founded in 1994, OQHC works to collect, document, preserve and share historical data, artifacts and materials as they become available. They are part of a larger movement of queer community archives dedicated to preserving information that is often not present within traditional mainstream archives.

As described by Portland State University, which collaborated with the group: "GLAPN members are involved in many activities that promote a greater awareness and understanding of our long history – including processing collections and doing independent research." OQHC's archives are located at the Oregon Historical Society.

OQHC's research is frequently featured and cited in local media, particularly in articles featuring local LGBTQ history. They collected oral histories from local LGBTQ figures in a partnership with Portland State University that began in 2000 and ended sometime before 2020, with some available to listen online.

== Queer community archive movement ==
Queer community archives are a movement of groups dedicated to collecting, documenting, and archiving materials and information relating to queer history. This type of information has historically been overlooked and undervalued by mainstream archives leaving smaller, more informal organizations such as the Oregon Queer History Collective to collect local information as part of a wider grassroots movement to fight potential queer erasure. Motivations for archiving often differ from traditional archives, as traditional archivists are often collecting information for an outside user base, whereas community archivists are their own user base. As archivists Anne Gilliland and Andrew Flinn said in their conference address generally regarding community archives, "community-based archivists are often collecting, curating and consuming their collections in one continuous process motivated by a desire to preserve and articulate historical narratives otherwise absent for themselves and their communities."

Materials collected by community archives can vary, but common collections include oral histories and interviews with LGBTQ activists and figures, photographs, news articles, court documentation, memorabilia, writings, and more.

== History ==
GLAPN was founded in October 1994 in Portland, Oregon, after a group of local historians were inspired by a lecture that Allan Bérubé gave at Portland State University "[emphasizing] the importance of organizing efforts to preserve gay and lesbian history". Founding members included Tom Cook, Bonnie Tinker, Jeanine Wittcke, and Pat Young. Since its founding, OQHC has partnered with the Oregon Historical Society to house its archives, which currently encompass 30 distinct collections spanning over 150 cubic feet. They became an official affiliate in 2013.

GLAPN changed its name to Oregon Queer History Collective in 2024. They announced the change in a post on Instagram in late 2023, stating that the intent was to "be more inclusive in our name; focus on our geographic location in Oregon; expand the ideas and realities of our work; and engage new methodological frameworks, both in how we organize our collective and how we work as public historians, archivists, and more."

== Archives and research ==
OQHC's primary focus is to collect and archive historical documents, materials, and accounts of LGBTQ+ history in Oregon. One preservation method is the acquisition of personal collections of photographs, news clippings, and other small remnants of past events. OQHC volunteers work with local figures who witnessed and participated in the events to identify photo subjects and provide context.

In a now-defunct partnership with Portland State University's Capstone program that began in 2000 and ended sometime before 2020, OQHC worked with students to collect and transcribe oral histories from elders in the Portland LGBTQ community. Over 200 were collected, and a portion are available online via the Oregon Historical Society's webpage. Portland State University has continued similar programs focusing on LGBTQ elders and transgender oral histories in partnership with other community groups.

Through its partnership with the Oregon Historical Society, OQHC's collections of manuscript materials, oral histories, and audiovisual files are available in-person, with select materials also available online. Collections include materials from prominent local LGBTQ activists, records of LGBTQ businesses, organizations, and community groups, and materials from various political and legal events relating to LGBTQ rights.

== Activism ==
OQHC has previously honored local "Queer Heroes" every June to celebrate Pride Month, with one being announced every day of the month. Community members, living or dead, could be nominated by the public based on the character traits of "risk, sacrifice, service, example and inspiration," and honorees were selected by a panel of former Queer Heroes. These tributes began in 2012 and ran through 2022 before pausing due to logistical issues. OQHC intends to restart the program at some point in the future.

OQHC members often research and write nominations for local buildings to be placed on the National Register of Historic Places for specific significance to local LGBTQ history. Successful bids include the Darcelle XV Showplace, a former gay bar and drag show venue in Portland, Oregon.

== See also ==
- GLBT Historical Society
- June L. Mazer Lesbian Archives
- Lambda Archives of San Diego
- Libraries and the LGBTQ community
- ONE National Gay & Lesbian Archives
- The OUTWORDS Archive
