= Funhouse Lounge =

Bar and venue in Portland, Oregon, U.S.

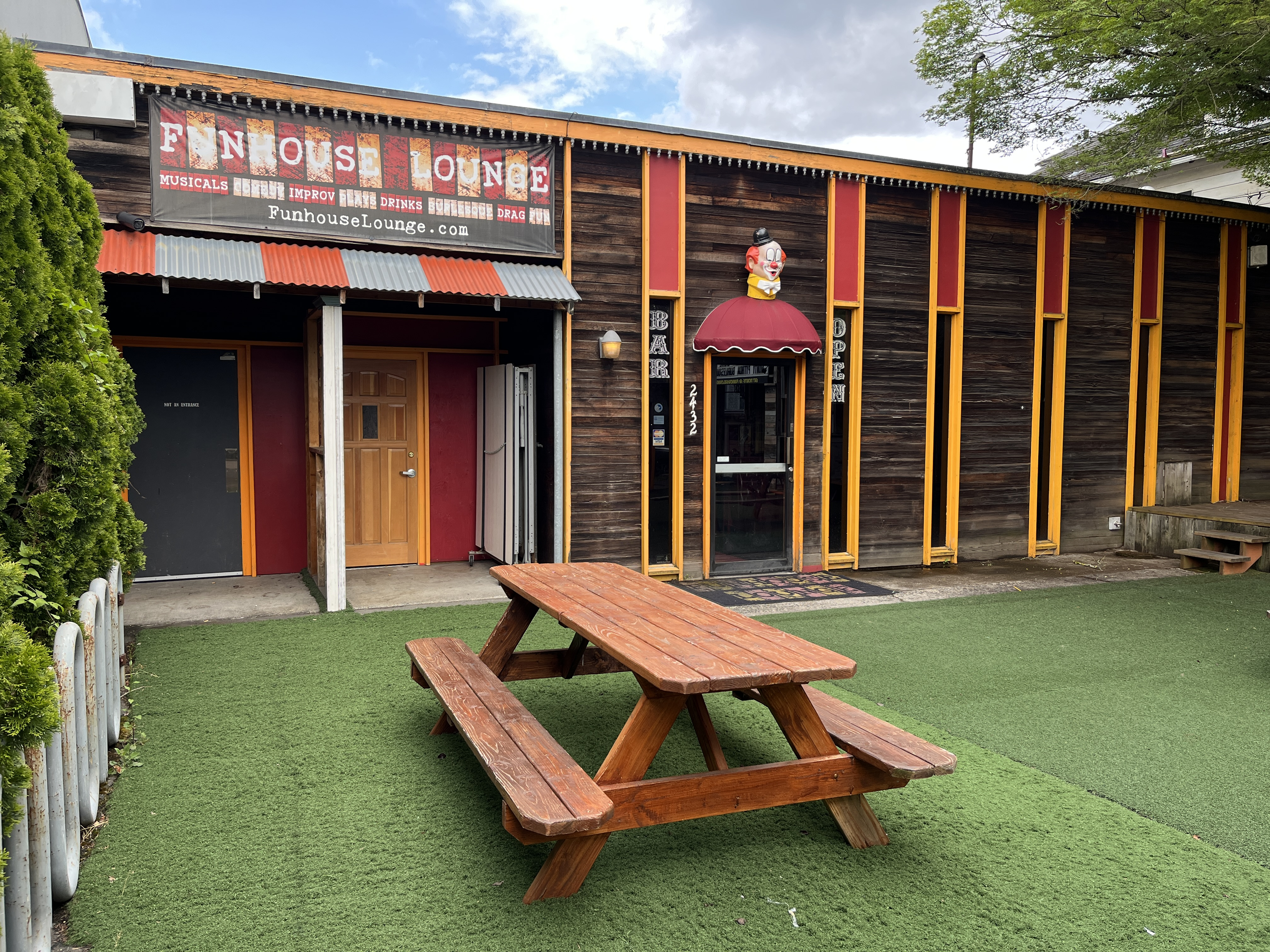
- The venue's exterior in 2025
- Interactive map of Funhouse Lounge
- Address: 2432 Southeast 11th Avenue
- Location: Portland, Oregon, U.S.
- Coordinates: 45°30′18.9″N 122°39′15.7″W
- Type: Venue; bar

Website
- Official website

Funhouse Lounge is a venue and bar in southeast Portland, Oregon's Hosford-Abernethy neighborhood, in the United States.

== Description and reception ==
The venue hosts comedy and theatre performances, including "Comic Strip", a monthly event in which comedians strip during their stand-up routines. Funhouse has also hosted productions of Reefer Madness and The Rocky Horror Show. Thrillist contributor Amy Wolfenberger included Funhouse in her list of "The Best Theme Bars in Portland", in which she wrote:

"The Funhouse is a wonderland of improv theater, beer, shots (no cocktails), clowns, and a general sense of whimsy. On any given night, you can get anything from stand-up to improvised episodes of Deadwood ... to burlesque. It's kind of like that scene in Fear & Loathing, only with fewer trapeze-friendly wolverines and more grown-up theater kids. Oh, and it's situated just across Ladd's Addition from legendary comic shop Excalibur, just in case you wanted to incorporate more capes into your fandom for the evening."

Funhouse Lounge earned second place in the "Best Comedy Club" category of Willamette Week's "Best of Portland Readers' Poll 2020".
