= Juniper House =

Building in Portland, Oregon, U.S.

- U.S. National Register of Historic Places
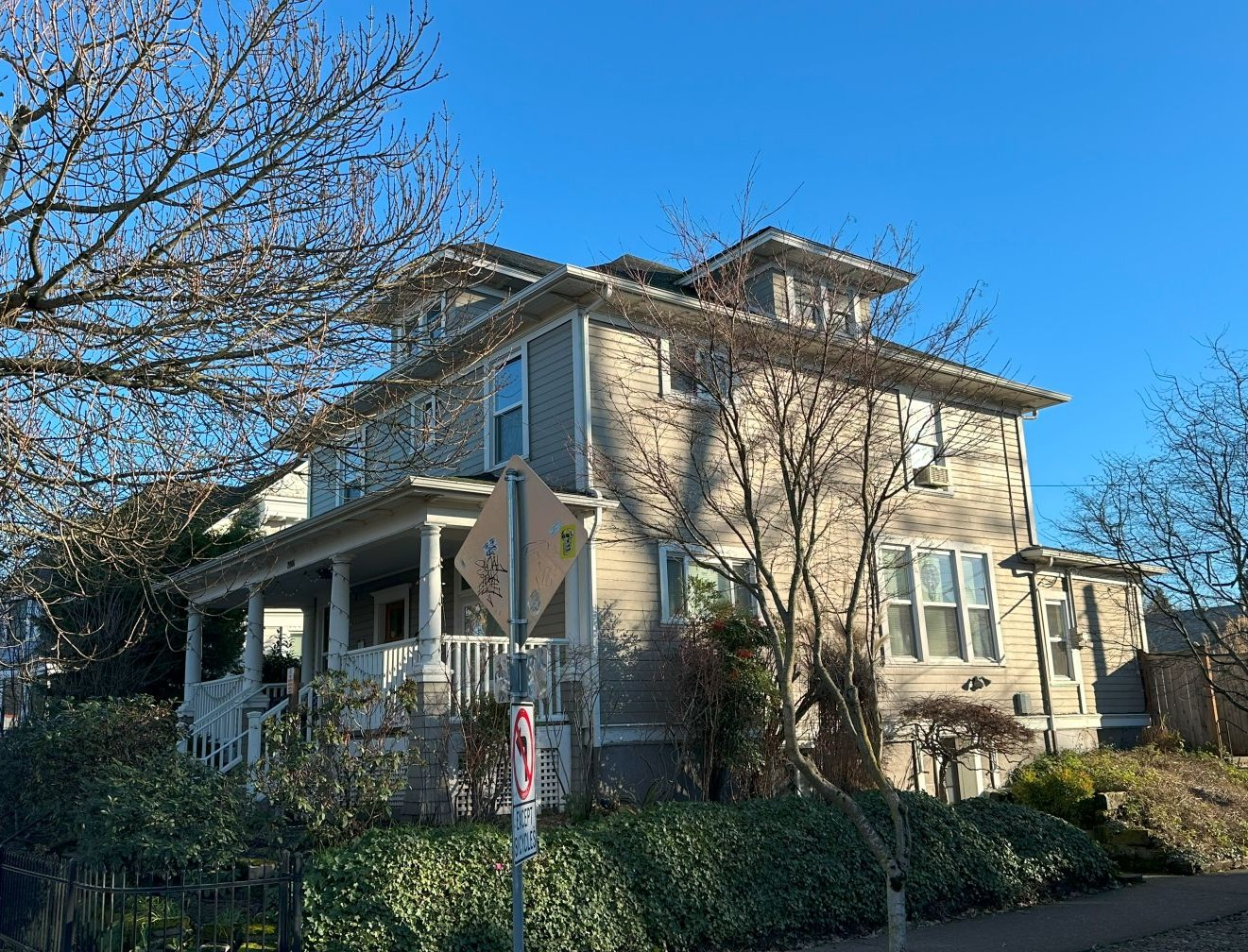
- Juniper House in 2025
- Interactive map
- Location: 2006 Southeast Ankeny Street, Portland, Oregon, U.S.
- Coordinates: 45°31′20″N 122°38′43″W
- Architect: American Craftsman
- NRHP reference No.: 100011448
- Added to NRHP: February 10, 2025

The Juniper House is a historic building in Portland, Oregon, United States. Located in southeast Portland's Buckman neighborhood, the structure was listed on the National Register of Historic Places in 2025.

== Description ==
Juniper House is a two-and-a-half-story, 3,000-square-foot American Craftsman structure. The house features a hipped roof with dormers, decorative v-notch wood siding, and a wide entry porch in the front with classical columns. The exterior of the house generally maintains the elements of the original architecture. However, several interior modifications were made during the conversion to an end-of-life care home, including partitioning larger rooms and adding paneling for sound insulation.

== History ==
The house was constructed around 1902 as a single family residence. In 1987, John Trevitts, Doug Foland and Jan Weyeneth transformed the house into an end-of-life care home for HIV/AIDS patients. The home operated from May 1987 to September 1989, caring for about 90 individuals during that time. The creation of Juniper House inspired the establishment of several more end-of-life care facilities dedicated to individuals with HIV/AIDS in Oregon.

According to KATU, "The nomination was part of the City of Portland's LGBTQ+ Historic Sites Project, funded by an Underrepresented Communities Grant from the National Park Service, an Oregon State Historic Preservation Office Heritage Grant, and general fund dollars from the Portland City Council. The recognition aligns with the 2024-2033 Oregon Preservation Plan, which aims to diversify the state's historic resources and uplift historically marginalized communities."

== See also ==
- HIV/AIDS in the United States
- National Register of Historic Places listings in Southeast Portland, Oregon
