= Scandals (gay bar) =

Gay bar in Portland, Oregon, U.S.

- Logo

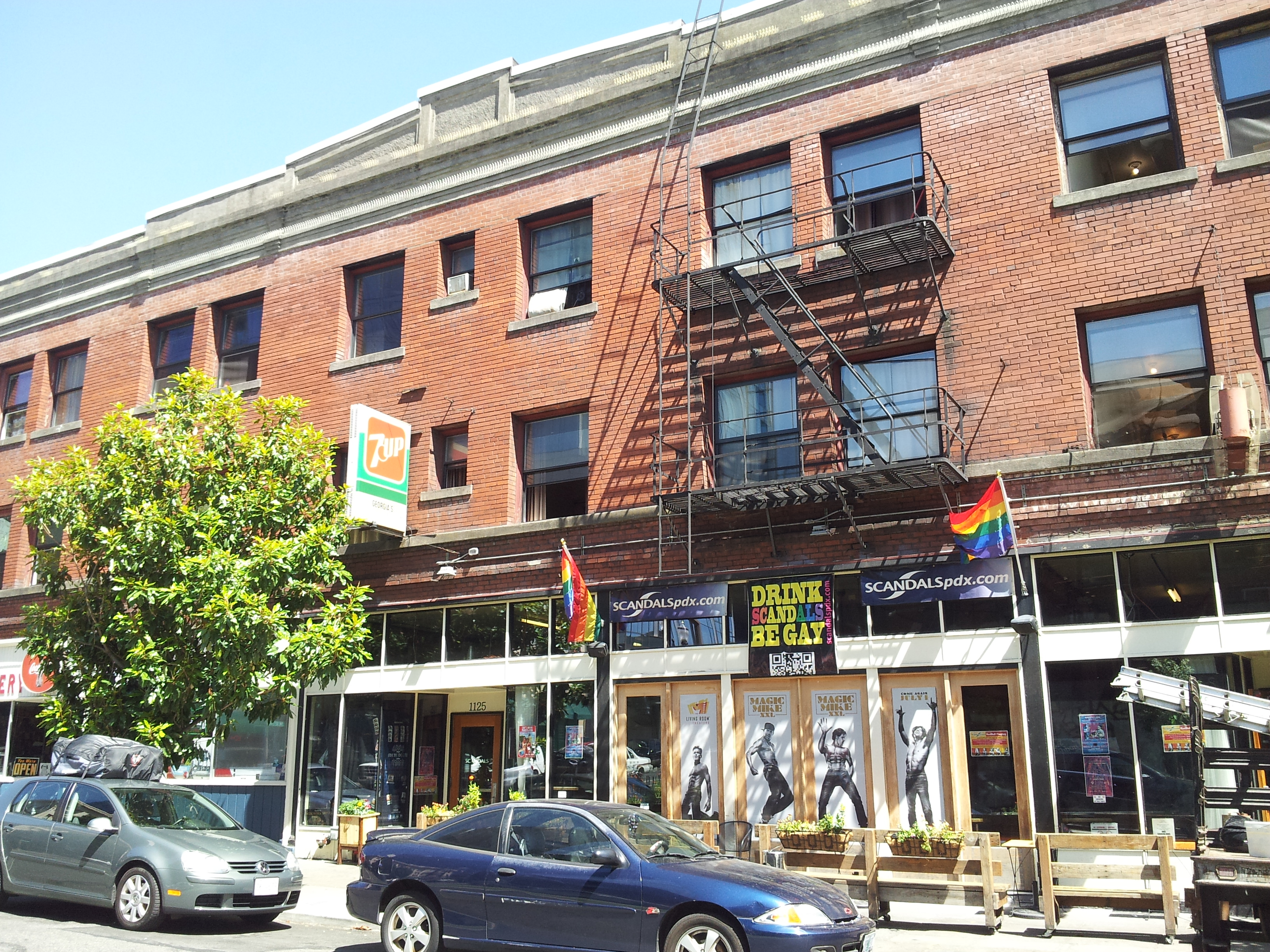
- The bar's exterior, 2015

- Location in Portland, Oregon
- Address: 1125 Southwest Stark Street
- Location: Portland, Oregon
- Coordinates: 45.52261°N 122.68287°W
- Type: Gay bar

Construction
- Opened: 1979

Website
- scandalspdx.com

Scandals, or sometimes Scandals PDX, is a gay bar in Portland, Oregon, in the United States. The bar was established in 1979.

In 2025, the business announced plans to close in downtown Portland and began operating in northeast Portland.

== Description and history ==
Scandals was established in 1979.

In 2015, Willamette Week said of the bar:

Scandals touts itself as 'Gay Cheers,' and it more than lives up to it, full of years-long regulars and yet immediately welcoming to the red-headed stranger wandering through. It feels like the friendliest place in town, from its always-packed landing strip of a patio, to a bar lined with flirtatious singletons, to its tiny, Timbers-watching TV corner tucked away to one side. Expect every-damn-body to be at its weekend-long Pride block party, now a Portland institution. As everything around it goes retail and restaurant, Scandals is holding up the Stark Street legacy all by itself. And with the bar's near-stunning pyramidal collection of flavored vodkas and rums and Red Bulls, you can rest assured: You're going to stay awake here, and it's going to be sweet.

In his 2019 "overview of Portland's LGBTQ+ nightlife for the newcomer", Andrew Jankowski of the Portland Mercury wrote: "At 40 years young, Scandals is among Portland's longest-running LGBTQ+ bars and is the last vestige of downtown's long-gone Vaseline Alley gay district. Scandals features pool tables, a sidewalk patio, trivia, viewing parties, karaoke, and monthly live jazz. You can order food from neighboring dive restaurant the Roxy and bring it over. Every June during Pride, Scandals shuts down their section of street for an epic block party."

In August 2025, the business announced plans to stop operating in downtown Portland on September 21. Scandals also announced plans to continue operating in northeast Portland.

== Reception ==
Scandals was a runner-up in the "Best LGBTQ Bar" category of Willamette Week's "Best of Portland Readers' Poll 2020".

== See also ==
- List of LGBTQ bars
