= Hey Love (bar) =

Restaurant in Portland, Oregon, U.S.

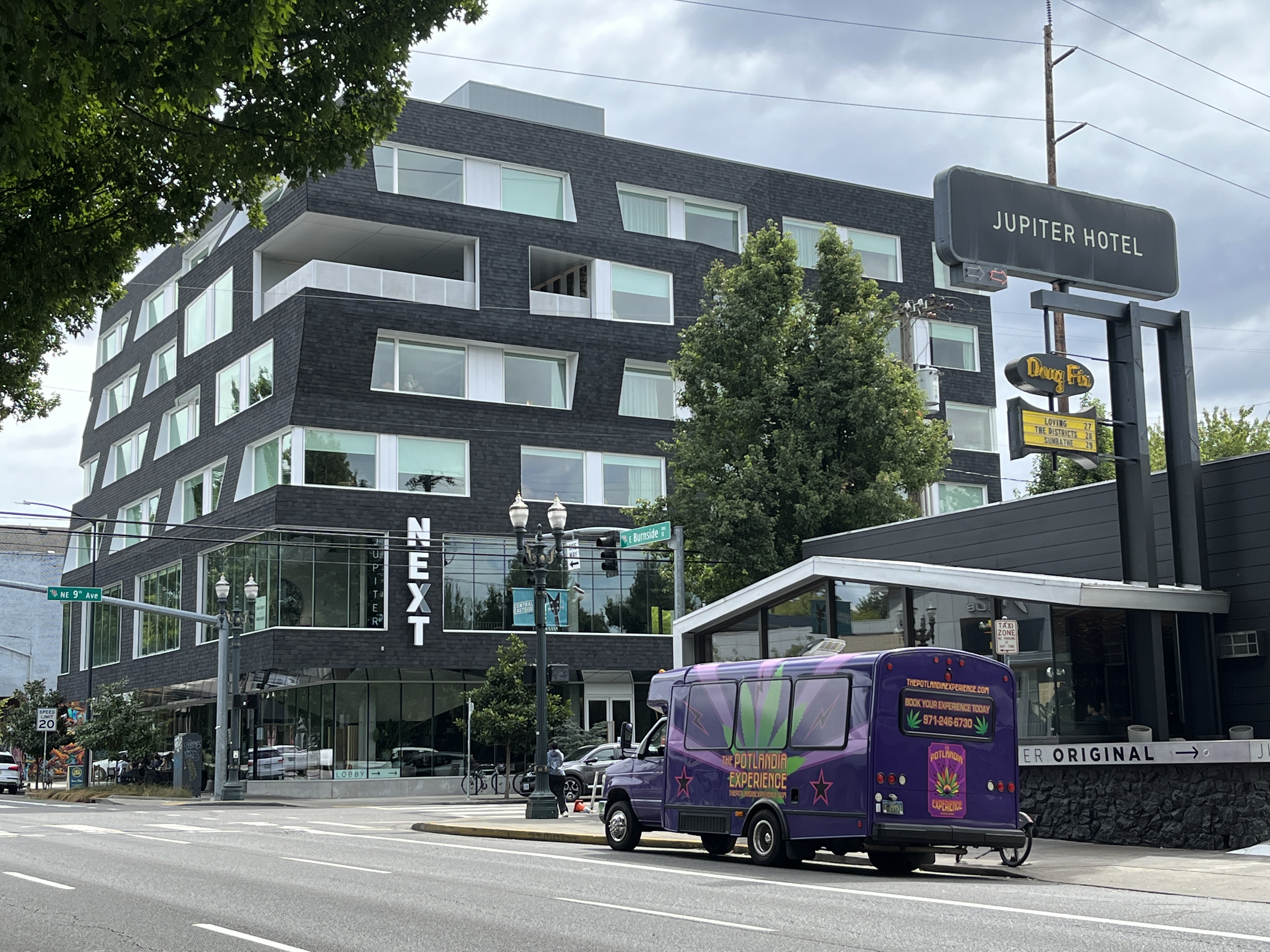
- Hey Love is the lobby bar at Jupiter Hotel's Next building (pictured in 2022)
- Interactive map of Hey Love

Restaurant information
- Established: 2018
- Location: 920 East Burnside Street, Portland, Multnomah, Oregon, 97214, United States
- Coordinates: 45.5228°N 122.6562°W
- Website: heylovepdx.com

Hey Love is a bar and restaurant in Portland, Oregon. Established in 2018, it is the lobby bar in Jupiter Hotel's Next building, in the Buckman neighborhood of Southeast Portland. Hey Love has hosted pop-ups and other themed events, including the holiday-themed Sleigh Love.

Hey Love has garnered a positive reception and was named the best hotel bar in the nation at Tales of the Cocktail's Spirited Awards in 2023.

== Description ==
The bar and restaurant Hey Love operates on Burnside Street, as part of Jupiter Hotel's Next building in Southeast Portland's Buckman neighborhood. Inside is an "indoor jungle" with ferns and other plants, as well as vintage lanterns. Willamette Week described the decor as "a flurry of highly photogenic touches from the South Pacific circa 1976, with intricate floral wallpaper, mismatched photos and a jungle of leafy plants that directly encourage the consumption of sugary, high-proof cocktails".

=== Menu ===
Hey Love serves brunch and lunch. The brunch menu includes birria chilaquiles, "breakfast tots", buttermilk donuts and gravy, cinnamon rolls with CBD caramel, shrimp and grits, a mango basil seed parfait with coconut whip, grits with barbecue sauce and watercress pineapple salad, and squash ganoush with chickpeas and vegan feta. Hey Love has also served ceviche, crab sliders, and nachos with chile verde and pickled jalapeños. The restaurant has gluten-free and vegan options.

The drink menu has alcoholic slushies and other tiki-themed cocktails. Options include the Tropical Contact High (a variation of a piña colada), the Master of Karate & Friendship (frosé with rum, lime, and strawberries), and the Oaxacan Sunrise (mezcal-passionfruit margarita).

== History ==
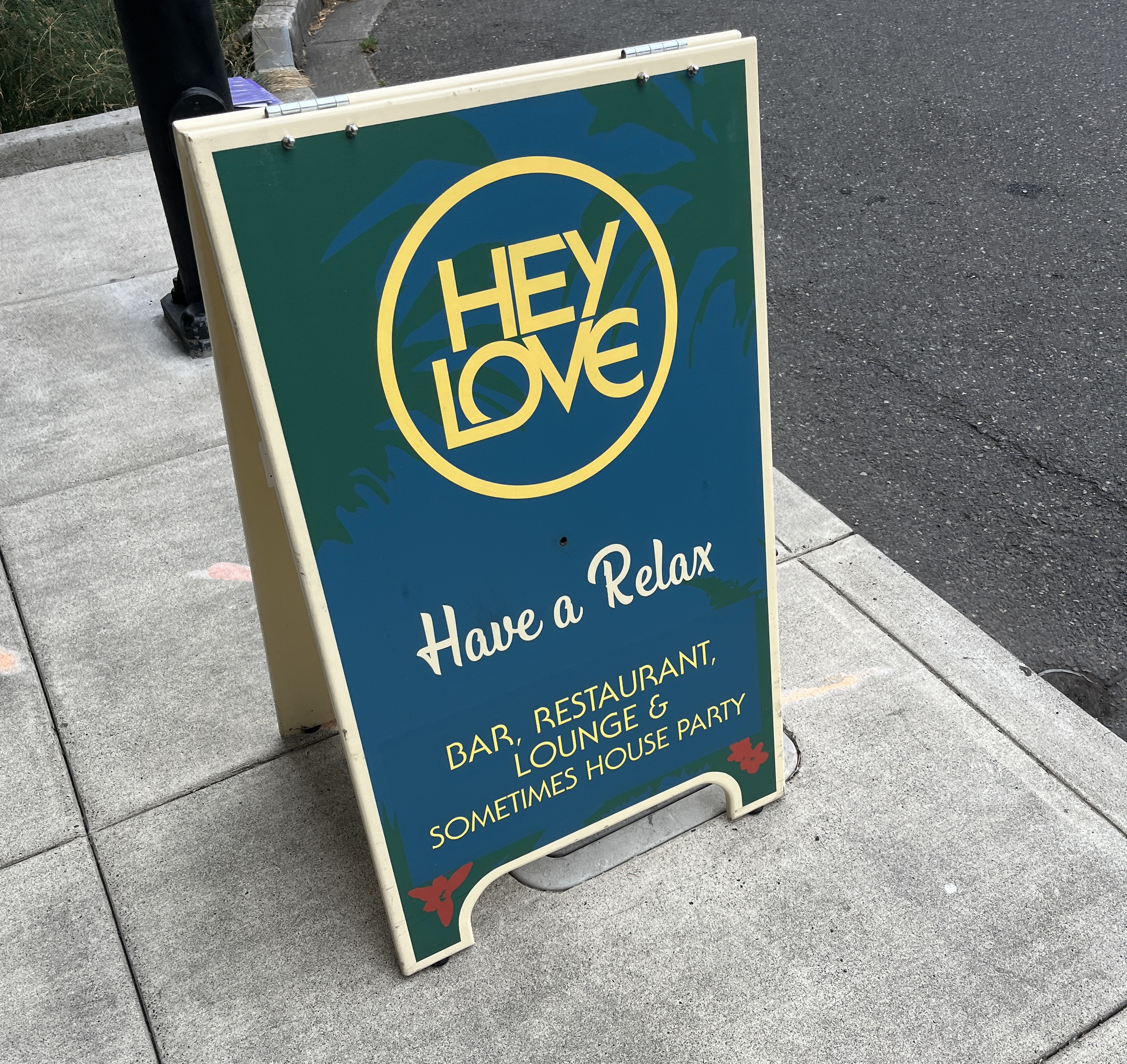
Sign for the bar, 2022

The team behind Hey Love includes bartenders Emily Mistell and Sophie Thomson, as well as the co-owners of Dig a Pony, Aaron Hall and Nicholas Musso. Hey Love opened in late 2018, and began serving brunch and lunch in December. Roscoe Roberson has been the chef. In 2022, Hey Love hosted the pop-up Black Lagoon. The bar has also hosted Dolly Parton-themed brunches to celebrate her birthday.

=== Sleigh Love ===
Hey Love has hosted a seasonal pop-up called Sleigh Love. The interior is decorated with Christmas lights, ornaments, and Santa Claus memorabilia, and the menu included ceviche, layered taco bowls, Cinnamon Toast Crunch Spanish coffee, eggnog slushies, and hot buttered rum. The Toboggan Time is a variation of a frozen Irish coffee with a Rumple Minze float, whipped cream, and sprinkles of candy cane. On December 21, 2023, Sleigh Love hosted Festivus for the Rest of Us, described by Eater Portland as a "celebration for those of the Seinfeldian faith, with a special food menu referencing famous moments from the show" such as matzo ball soup and fried kosher wieners.

== Reception ==
In 2018, Hey Love was nominated in the Bar of the Year and Most Beautiful Restaurant of the Year categories of Eater Portland's annual Eater Awards. Hey Love was also included in the website's 2025 list of Portland's best brunch restaurants. Katrina Yentch included the business in Eater Portland's 2025 overview of the best restaurants in Buckman.

Hey Love won in the Best Cocktail Lounge category and was a runner-up in the Best Date Bar category of Willamette Week's annual readers' poll in 2020. It placed second and won in the same poll's Best Cocktail Bar category in 2022 and 2025, respectively. Hey Love was named the nation's best hotel bar at Tales of the Cocktail's Spirited Awards in 2023.
