= Mohamed Sheikh Abdirahman Kariye =

Sheikh Mohamed Abdirahman Kaariye is a Muslim religious figure and former Imam of Masjid As-Saber, one of the largest mosques in Portland, Oregon. His father was an Imam in Somalia.

In 2014 he had been jailed, but Muslim crowds chanted "God is great" on the steps of the Federal courthouse here after prominent New York civil rights lawyer Stanley Cohen announced he had secured bail. Cohen and federal prosecutors reached an agreement that allowed for Kariye's release.
