= 1918 Spanish flu quarantine in Portland, Oregon =

Portland's Spanish flu quarantine was a set of rules put in place in Portland, Oregon during the 1918 flu pandemic, to control the spread of influenza. The rules involved restricting public congregation, closing stores early, and quarantining houses where the influenza was present.

== First cases ==
The first reported case of Spanish flu in Portland was that of Private James McNeese, who arrived in Portland on October 3, 1918, on his way to a cavalry officers' training camp in Texas. McNeese was diagnosed with the flu at Portland's city hospital and sent to the military hospital at the Vancouver Barracks. Thirty more cases of influenza were reported among an army training detachment at Benson Polytechnic High School several days later, leading to the school being quarantined and turned into a makeshift hospital. Portland Health Officer George Parish was "confident that preventative measures and the application of proper precautions on the part of citizens will serve to hold the malady at a minimum." By the end of October there were over 1000 cases, and the Portland Civic Auditorium was also converted into a hospital.

Still, pressure from the public and businesses led Mayor Baker to reopen the city on November 16. The quarantine was imposed again on December 11, though not popular or heeded by many. Cases rose by mid-January, and people began wearing masks.

== Rules ==
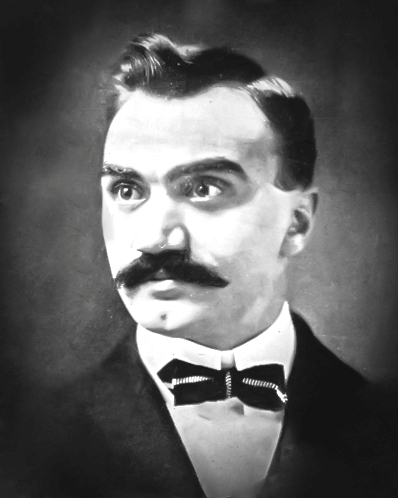
George Luis Baker, who was Mayor of Portland, Oregon during the quarantine.

In early October 1918, Portland was placed under a strict set of rules to prevent the spread of influenza. After an all-day conference of health officials on October 10, Mayor George Luis Baker announced the specifics of the policy. All downtown stores were required to close at 3:30 PM, and offices were required to close at 4:00 PM. Certain businesses were allowed to remain open after the 3:30 cutoff, but only if they were supplying food or medical supplies. The rules caused some odd distinctions—for instance, ice cream was allowed to be sold after 3:30, but not sodas or "ice cream mixtures", which were considered drinks. "Schools, churches, lodges, public places of meetings, and places of amusement" were to be closed completely. Police and firemen would be stationed on the streets to keep people from congregating, maintaining the distance of four feet between people as required.

== Opposition ==
The quarantine efforts were met with some opposition. Quarantine was unpopular among doctors, who often protested Health Officials efforts to quarantine houses. According to The Oregonian, "[half] a dozen doctors called at the City Health Bureau during the day and attempted to explain that some of their 'flu' cases were tonsillitis, colds, or something else that is not on the list of quarantinable disease."

In January 1919, the Portland City Council attempted to pass an emergency clause requiring flu masks in public. For an emergency clause to pass, it had to be approved by all City Council Members. However, the clause requiring masks was blocked by City Commissioner Mann, as well as many "drugless healers". Attorney W. T. Vaughn called the clause unconstitutional, saying that "This is class legislation and nothing else. [Doctors] admit that they know nothing of the disease, but are attempting to muzzle us like a pack of hydrophobia dogs." The ensuing debate lasted for nearly two hours, and the legislation did not pass.

== Aid programs ==
The City Health Officer enlisted many workers from fields outside of medicine to help control the disease and quarantine homes. In the beginning of October, a set of slides was prepared to be displayed at theaters, with information on flu safety, such as the rhyme "Smother the sneeze / To prevent disease." (Despite these plans, theaters were shut down less than a week later, when the ban went into effect.) Teachers, who had been put out of work by the ban, were enlisted to find houses of flu victims. On 5 November 1918, several hundred teachers and school administrators met in the city council chamber, while the City Health Officer Parrish outlined a plan. At that point, teachers had not been working for the past three weeks because of the pandemic. "Teachers will survey each house in the assigned district, giving health instructions and explaining the necessity of fumigating thoroughly all houses where influenza has put in an appearance."

A local auditorium was converted into a hospital, with 100 beds acquired from the Vancouver Barracks, linens provided by the Red Cross, and a separate ward for Japanese Americans. The hospital was intended for those who had no one to treat them and couldn't afford a private hospital.

The health office was also working day and night to find and quarantine influenza cases. In just 1 day in December 1918, 12 heath deputies quarantined 159 cases, and Officer Parrish alone managed to visit 39 homes in a 24-hour stretch.

== Reactions ==
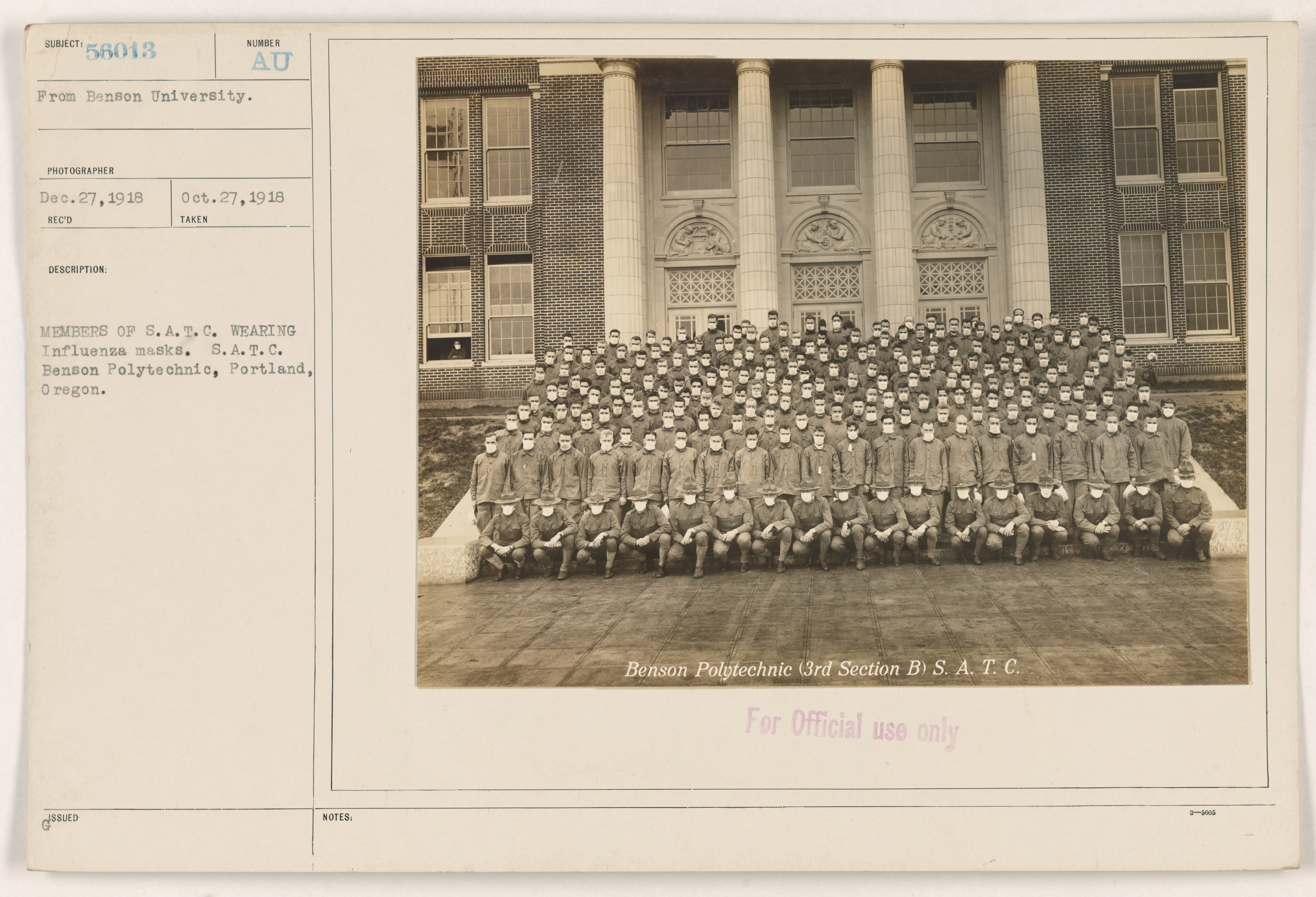
Members of Student Army Training Corps at Benson Polytechnic wearing flu masks during the pandemic in December 1918.

In December 1918, Coos Bay, Oregon ran out of child-sized coffins, and corpses were held until more coffins could arrive from Portland. Fred Wilson, the only undertaker in Coos Bay, fell ill with influenza, from working with infected corpses.

The Oregonian's "Society" column described a sense of amusement from the prevalence of flu masks. The column observed how the masks made it difficult for people to recognize each other, and how "they are rapidly learning the art of using their eyes to express their sentiments." The column even went as far as to compare wearing flu masks to "indulging in a Halloween Prank or going to a masquerade party."

W. E. Hill, an artist drawing scenes from life for The Oregonian, comically illustrated the tension around risk of infection. In the illustration, a boy on a streetcar begins to cough after choking on an almond, causing panic as all other passengers clutch their handkerchiefs to their mouths.

== See also ==
- COVID-19 pandemic in Portland, Oregon
