= Irving Street Kitchen =

Defunct restaurant in Portland, Oregon, U.S.

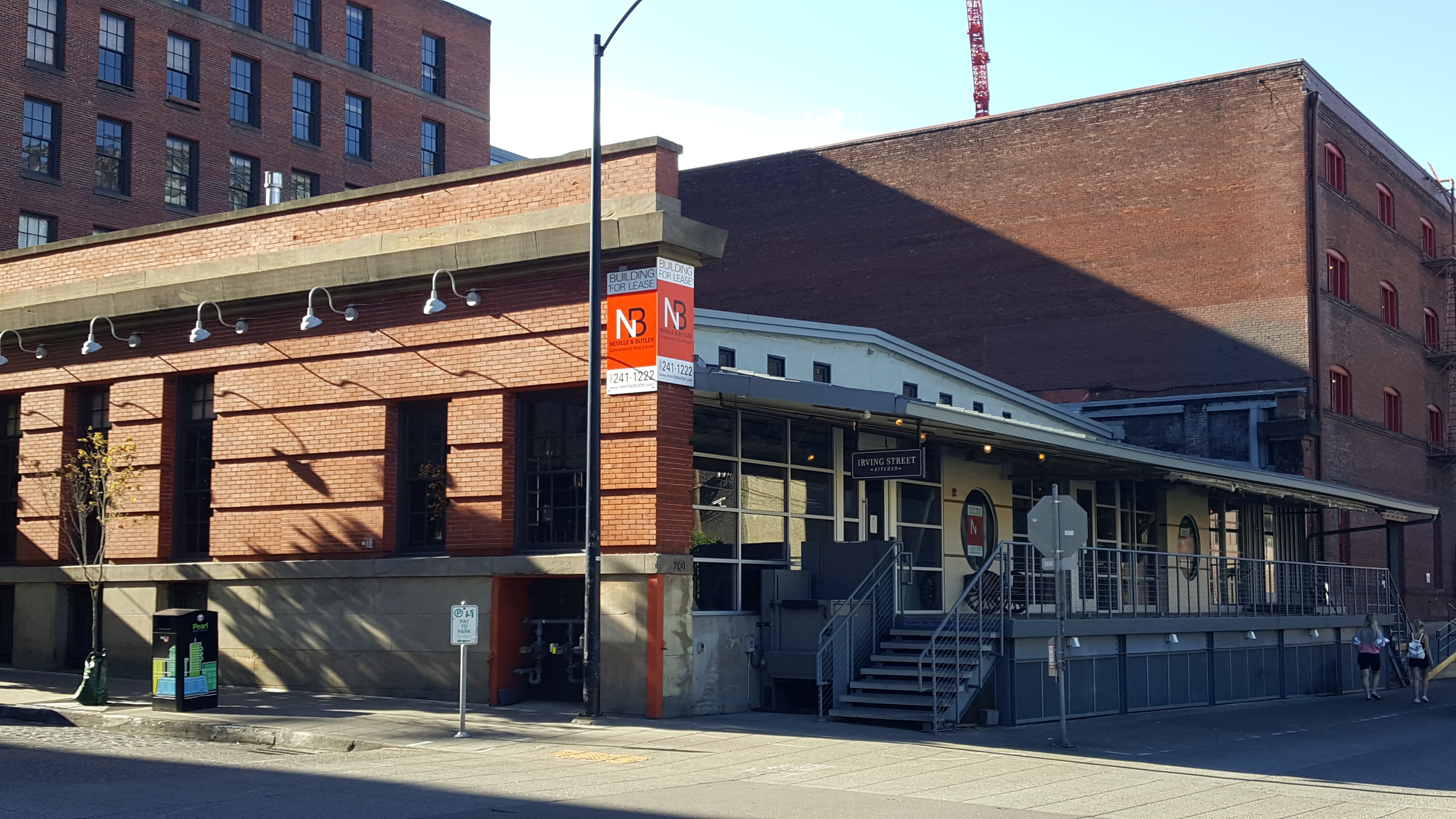
- The restaurant's exterior in August 2020, after closing during the COVID-19 pandemic
- Interactive map of Irving Street Kitchen

Restaurant information
- Established: 2010
- Closed: June 2020
- Head chef: Sarah Schafer
- Food type: American
- Location: 701 Northwest 13th Avenue, Portland, Multnomah, Oregon, 97209, United States
- Coordinates: 45.528076°N 122.684644°W
- Website: irvingstreetkitchen.com

Irving Street Kitchen was a restaurant serving American cuisine in Portland, Oregon's Pearl District, in the United States. Conceived by Doug Washington, Mitch Rosenthal and Steve Rosenthal as their interpretation on American cuisine with a Southern influence, it opened on May 6, 2010. With executive chef Sarah Schafer, Irving Street Kitchen added to their serving hours over the years, opening up for lunch and brunch. The restaurant also shifted towards casual dining in 2019, revamping its menu and ambiance. Irving Street Kitchen ultimately closed during the COVID-19 pandemic.

== History ==
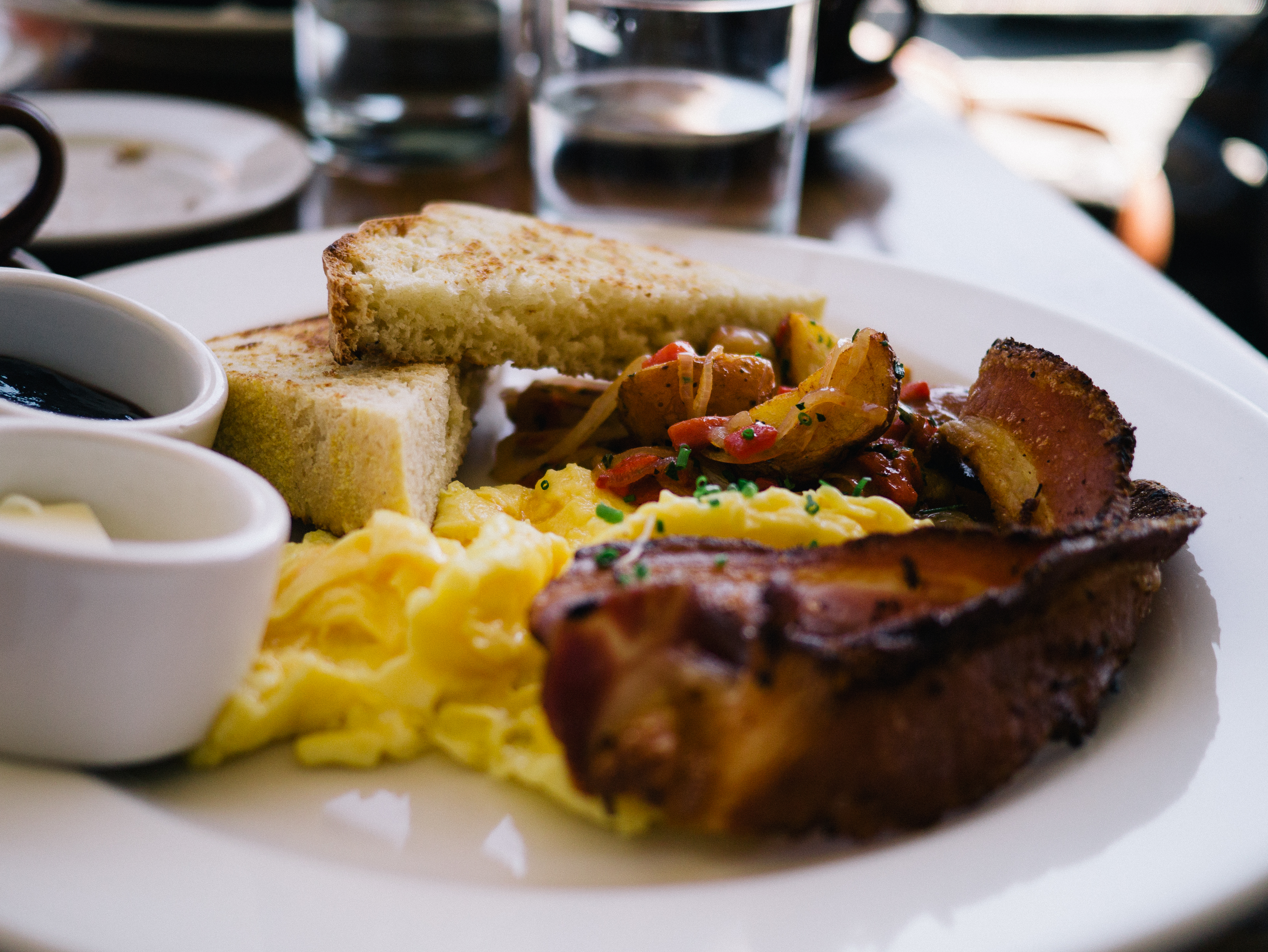
A dish of eggs, bacon and toast at Irving Street Kitchen.

Irving Street Kitchen was opened by restaurateurs Doug Washington, Mitch Rosenthal, and Steve Rosenthal. Washington and the Rosenthal brothers knew each other from working at Wolfgang Puck's restaurant Postrio, and had previous success with other restaurants they operated in San Francisco. Wanting to expand their restaurant group, the three partners sought out another city to expand to. According to Washington, he settled on opening a restaurant in Portland because he felt like the city's atmosphere matched with his and the other owners' tastes. Originally conceptualized under the temporary name of Crane Tavern, Washington and the Rosenthals envisioned a restaurant that had "a local-farmer bent, Southern undertones and a taste of American regional food, with our sensitivities". The three of them signed a minimum ten-year lease in the Pearl District in 2010, taking the place of another restaurant that had closed. Chef Sarah Schafer, who was chef de cuisine at the Washington and Rosenthal–owned Anchor & Hope, was persuaded to move from San Francisco to become the new restaurant's executive chef.

With its name changed to Irving Street Kitchen, the new restaurant opened on May 6, 2010, with an opening-day menu consisting of items like smoked short rib, fried chicken with collard greens, and charcuterie. The next month, Irving Street Kitchen unveiled a barbecue lunch menu. They also began serving brunch on August 7, 2010, offering items like a smoked shrimp club sandwich, sourdough flapjacks, and scrambled eggs with lobster and mascarpone. Irving Street Kitchen began serving lunch on June 6, 2016.

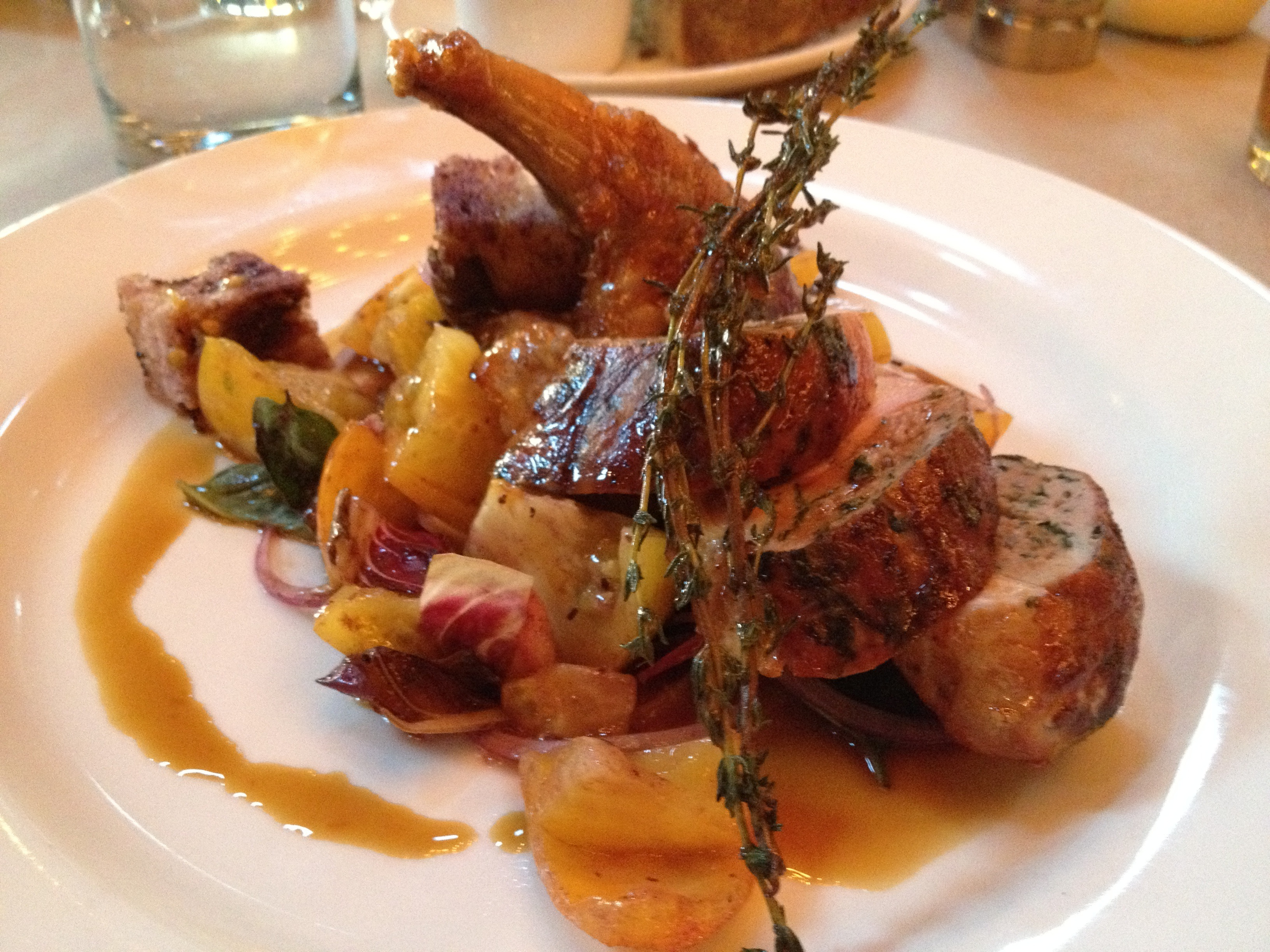
Game hen from Irving Street Kitchen.

In 2019, Irving Street Kitchen announced that it would be revamping its decor and menu to give off a more casual atmosphere. Schafer, by now the co-owner as well as the head chef, stated that the change "[was] a response to our diners" who, according to Schafer, did not currently care for the "pomp and circumstance" that the original concept provided. In addition, the restaurant would also host pop-up restaurants by guest chefs, as well as give yoga classes to its staff and other restaurant employees after work to promote a healthy work–life balance. General manager and co-owner Anna Caporael elaborated on this, saying that they "[wanted] to have a space that [was] stimulating for our next generation". According to a 2020 report by the Portland Monthly, Schafer and Caporael owned 30% of Irving Street Kitchen. It was also mentioned by The Oregonian that Moana Restaurant Group owned the establishment.

In June 2020, during the COVID-19 pandemic, Schafer and Caporael announced that Irving Street Kitchen would permanently close, citing the pandemic along with landlord disputes as the reason for the restaurant's closure. Earlier that year in March, it was reported that when the restaurant halted operations due to Portland's measures to combat COVID-19, Caporael gave equipment and perishable items to Stone Soup, a local nonprofit providing food service training for those at risk of homelessness. The restaurant also temporarily opened on March 17, 2020 to give away food to those in the service industry who needed it.

== Reception ==
In 2010, The Oregonian's David Sarasohn gave the restaurant a "B" rating, stating that "the kitchen's Southern skills make Irving Street a considerable gain for the neighborhood and the local dining scene." Chris Stamm of the Willamette Week liked the poultry dishes on his 2015 trip, citing the "perfectly cooked, falling-off-the-bone" confit duck leg, "smooth, livery" duck sausage, and fried chicken as standout items. Karen Brooks of the Portland Monthly enjoyed Irving Street Kitchen's brunch, calling it "one of the best brunches in the city, led by attention to details, a high level of craft, and some memorable flavors."

== See also ==
- COVID-19 pandemic in Portland, Oregon
- Impact of the COVID-19 pandemic on the restaurant industry in the United States
