= American Herbal Products Association =

The American Herbal Products Association (AHPA) is a trade association for the herbal products industry, founded in 1982 and based in Silver Spring, Maryland. Members of AHPA are domestic and foreign companies doing business as growers, processors, manufacturers and marketers of herbs and herbal products. AHPA's membership also includes companies that provide expert services to the herbal trade, including analytical laboratories, insurance providers, non-profit associations, higher education institutions, law firms and more.

AHPA's mission is to promote the responsible commerce of herbal products to ensure that consumers continue to enjoy informed access to a wide variety of herbal goods. It provides a host of resources and services, including:

- Good Agricultural Collection Practices and Good Manufacturing Practices (GACP-GMP) for botanical materials
- Recommendations for regulators for Distribution, Cultivation, Analytics, and Manufacturing, Packaging and Labeling of Cannabis.
- Botanical Identity References Compendium
- Botanical Safety Handbook

Every year, AHPA presents its Botanical Congress in conjunction with the Supply Side West trade show held in Las Vegas.
