= Portland Incubator Experiment =

Business incubator in Portland, Oregon, U.S.

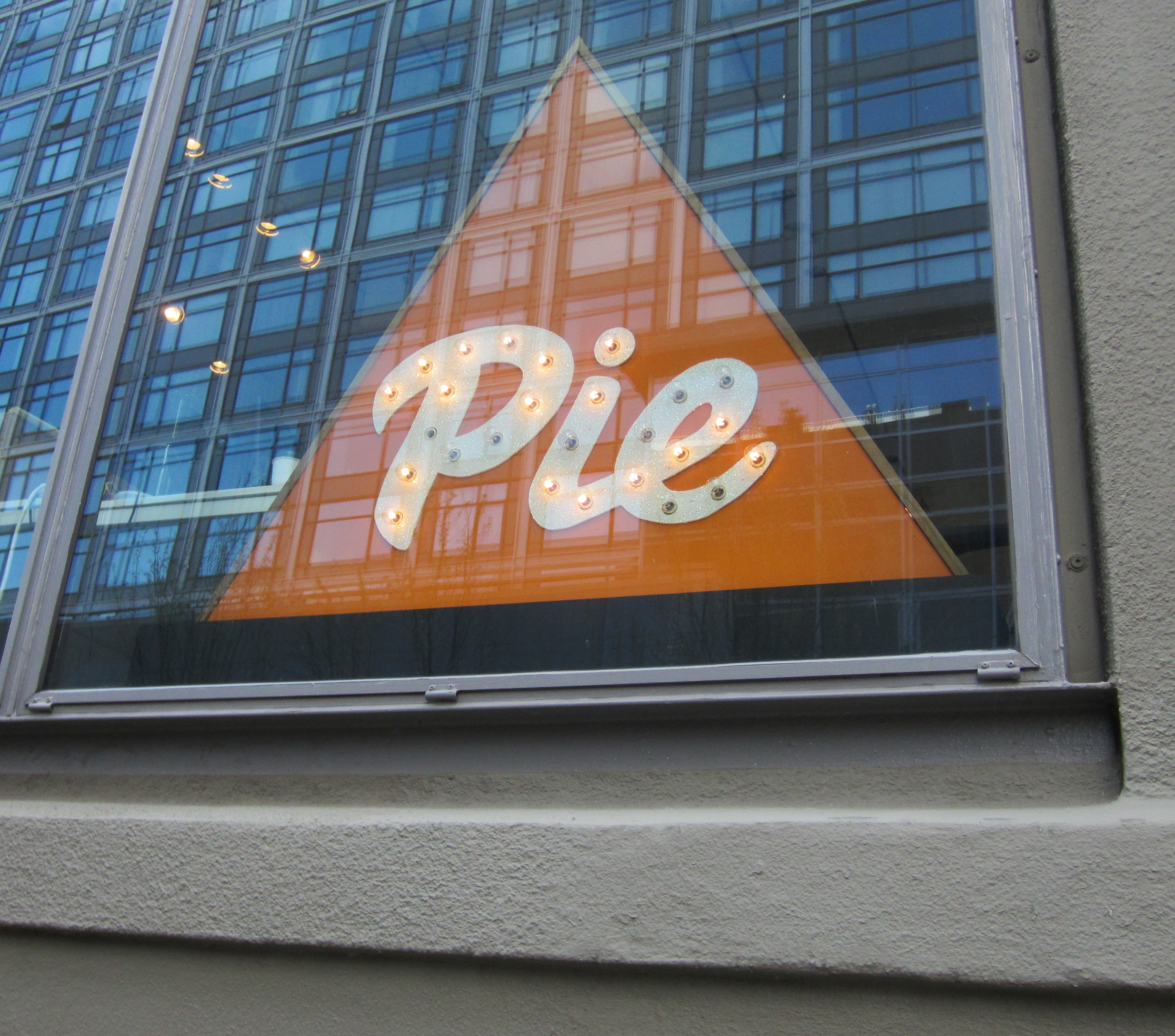
Exterior of the Portland Incubator Experiment offices in Portland, Oregon in 2013

The Portland Incubator Experiment, often abbreviated as PIE or PIE PDX or stylized as Pie, is a business incubator based in Portland, Oregon that provides mentorship and resources to select startup companies. Co-founded by Renny Gleeson and Rick Turoczy, PIE is run by the Portland-based advertising agency Wieden+Kennedy (W+K). The program was informally launched in 2009 before converting to a formal structure in 2011. PIE participants are chosen by a selection committee, following an application process. Startups receive seed money and spend three months developing their businesses with support from W+K and participating mentors. Companies that have provided financial assistance and mentorship include The Coca-Cola Company, Google, Intel, Nike, Inc. and Target Corporation.

The program's inaugural "class" supported eight businesses primarily focused on mobile technology, most of which were Portland-based. PIE's 2012 class included a wider variety of business models. Following graduation, startups are provided with an opportunity to pitch their business plans; several companies have received investments as a result.

== Program structure ==
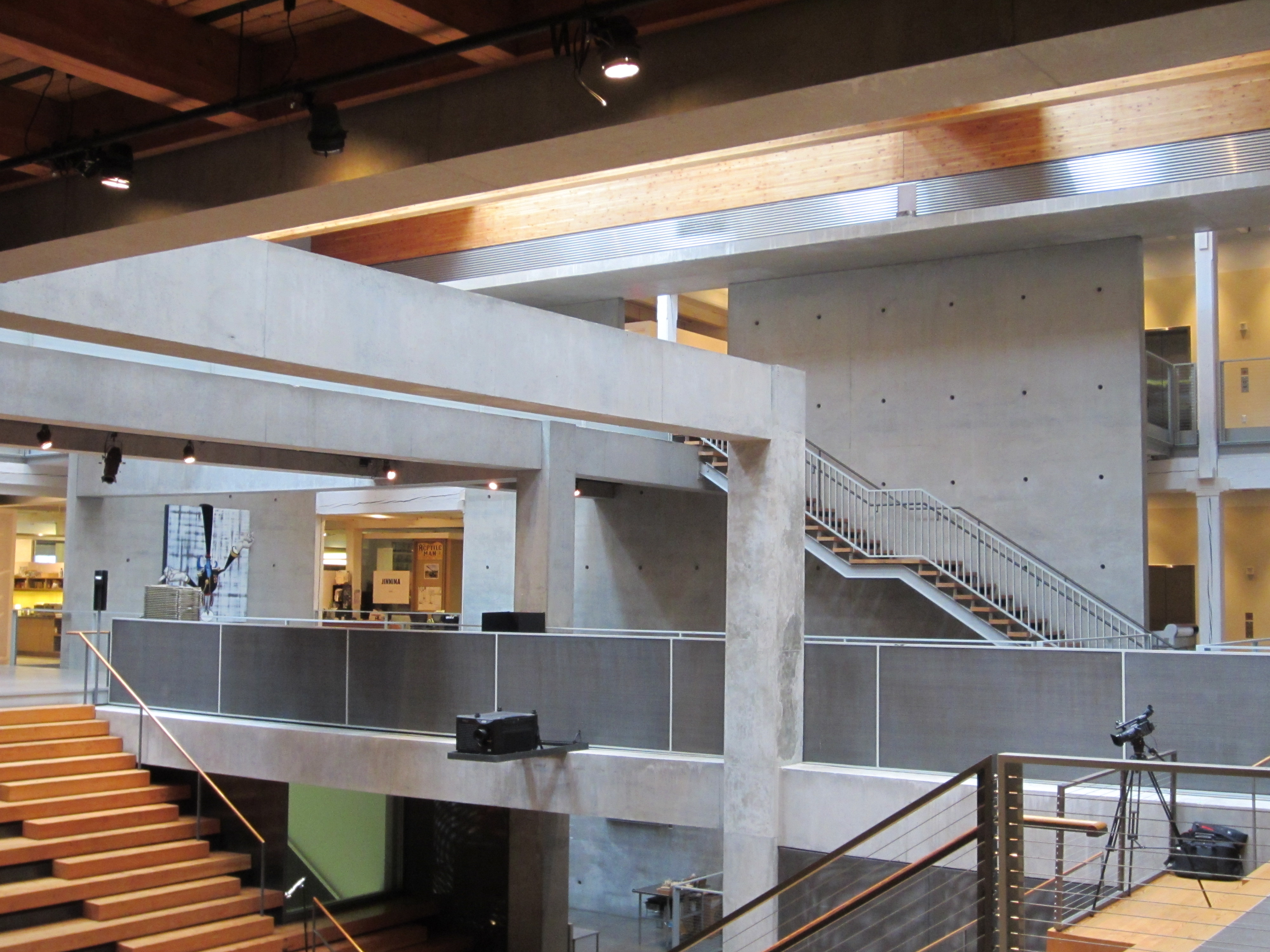
Program participants spend three months developing their businesses at the Portland offices of advertising agency Wieden+Kennedy (pictured in 2012).

The Portland Incubator Experiment (PIE), co-founded by Renny Gleeson and Rick Turoczyis, is a business incubator based in Portland, Oregon that advises and provides resources to startup companies. The program, "informally launched" in 2009 and converted into a structured program in 2011, is run by the Portland-based advertising agency Wieden+Kennedy (W+K). Following an application process, startups are chosen by a selection committee. Participants receive $18,000 in seed money in exchange for six percent stakes and spend three months at W+K's Northwest Portland offices, developing their businesses with assistance from "mentors, W+K, big brands and other startups". Program rounds are often referred to as "classes", from which participating businesses "graduate".

The Portland Incubator Experiment is similar to the Portland Seed Fund, a public-private program (funded in part by the cities of Hillsboro and Portland and the Oregon Lottery) that encourages entrepreneurship and invests in startups.

== Classes and results ==
=== 2011 ===
Applications for the inaugural class were due on August 8, 2011. PIE received 290 applications from interested entrepreneurs, sixty percent of which resided outside Oregon. PIE initially selected nine companies to participate in the incubator project, but one withdrew early. Program participants in 2011 included:

- Athletepath, a social networking service "connecting races and results"
- Cloudability, a software service that "compares how companies use cloud services with what they spend"
- DailyPath, a service that provides "short" inspirational messages, helping people to reach their goals
- MoPIX, a platform that helps video producers release custom iOS application software
- Revisu, a cloud site that "connects designers and clients for feedback and approval"
- Spotsi, a platform for mobile multimedia "tours"
- Stayhound, a social networking service for locating pet sitters
- VendScreen, a technology that adds "Android-based touchscreen devices to vending machines", offers cashless transactions, provides nutrition information and stores data

Seven of the companies were based in Portland; the eighth (Los Angeles–based MoPIX) planned to open a two-person office in the city. According to Turoczy, each "[had] a part in the city's budding mobile technology scene". W+K connected entrepreneurs with some of its clients, including The Coca-Cola Company, Nike, Inc. and Target Corporation. Financial assistance and mentorship was also provided by Google.

In January 2012, the participating companies offered eight-minute presentations, pitching their products to a crowd of 400 at the Bagdad Theater. VendScreen announced that it had received a $12 million investment for its technology. Athletepath and Cloudability also confirmed investments of $300,000 and $1.25 million, respectively. The Oregonian reported in February 2012 that two of Stayhound's three founders left after the class ended, seeking stable income. In July 2012, the Willamette Week reported that Cloudability had received $8.7 million in investments.

=== 2012 ===
PIE began accepting applications for its second class in February 2012. However, the application process was postponed in order to confirm "expert" participation. PIE also made changes to "improve the mentorship program and the overall experience for entrepreneurs". The application deadline was extended to June 12. 300 applications were submitted despite little promotion from PIE. Companies were chosen by a "loose" selection committee consisting of at least eight people. According to Turoczy, the program's second class included a greater variety of business plans, with "fewer daily deal pitches... and fewer location-based check-in companies". Businesses selected to participate included:

- AppThwack, a service for testing application software and websites on Android smartphones and tablet computers
- KS12, a studio that "tells stories which blur the line between documentary and fiction, artwork and essay"
- Lytics.io, an API that provides analytics to developers
- Plexus Engine, a tool suite for influencer marketing and "expert discovery and engagement"
- Portland Women's Software Academy, a nonprofit organization focused on "educating and encouraging would-be software developers"
- Stublisher, a service for "capturing and curating event experiences"
- Vadio, a service that turns "terrestrial" radio station websites into live video channels

The program began on July 16. Participants received assistance from sponsors at The Coca-Cola Company, Google, Intel, Nike and other Oregon technology professionals. PIE added a staff position for the program, designating Wieden+Kennedy's Kirsten Golden as "class manager".

== See also ==
- Angel investor
- Venture capital financing
