= Oaks Park Roller Skating Rink =

Roller rink in Portland, Oregon, U.S.

- The rink's exterior, 2026
- Interactive map of Oaks Park Roller Skating Rink
- Address: 7805 Southeast Oaks Park Way
- Location: Portland, Oregon, United States
- Coordinates: 45.47372°N 122.66218°W
- Type: Roller rink

Construction
- Opened: 1905

The Oaks Park Roller Skating Rink is a roller rink at Oaks Amusement Park, in Portland, Oregon's Sellwood neighborhood, in the United States.

== History ==
Entrance to the rink, 2026

The rink opened in 1905. It is the oldest roller skating rink in the US.

During the Great Depression, admission prices were reduced so families could better afford skating. Additionally the park owner, Edward Bollinger, started the Junior Roller Skating Club which skated on Sunday afternoons. This led to the largest number of active roller skaters ever at Oaks Park Skating Rink.

Built in a flood plain, in 1948, water damage from the same flood that destroyed Vanport required five months to repair. During rebuilding, engineers installed iron barrels under the rink floor so it could float above flooding waters in the future. The rink flooded again in the Christmas flood of 1964 but it suffered some damage because workers could not immediately access the rink due to 8 feet (2.4 m) of flooding waters in the park. A day later and after four hours of effort, they severed the floor supports to allow it to float.

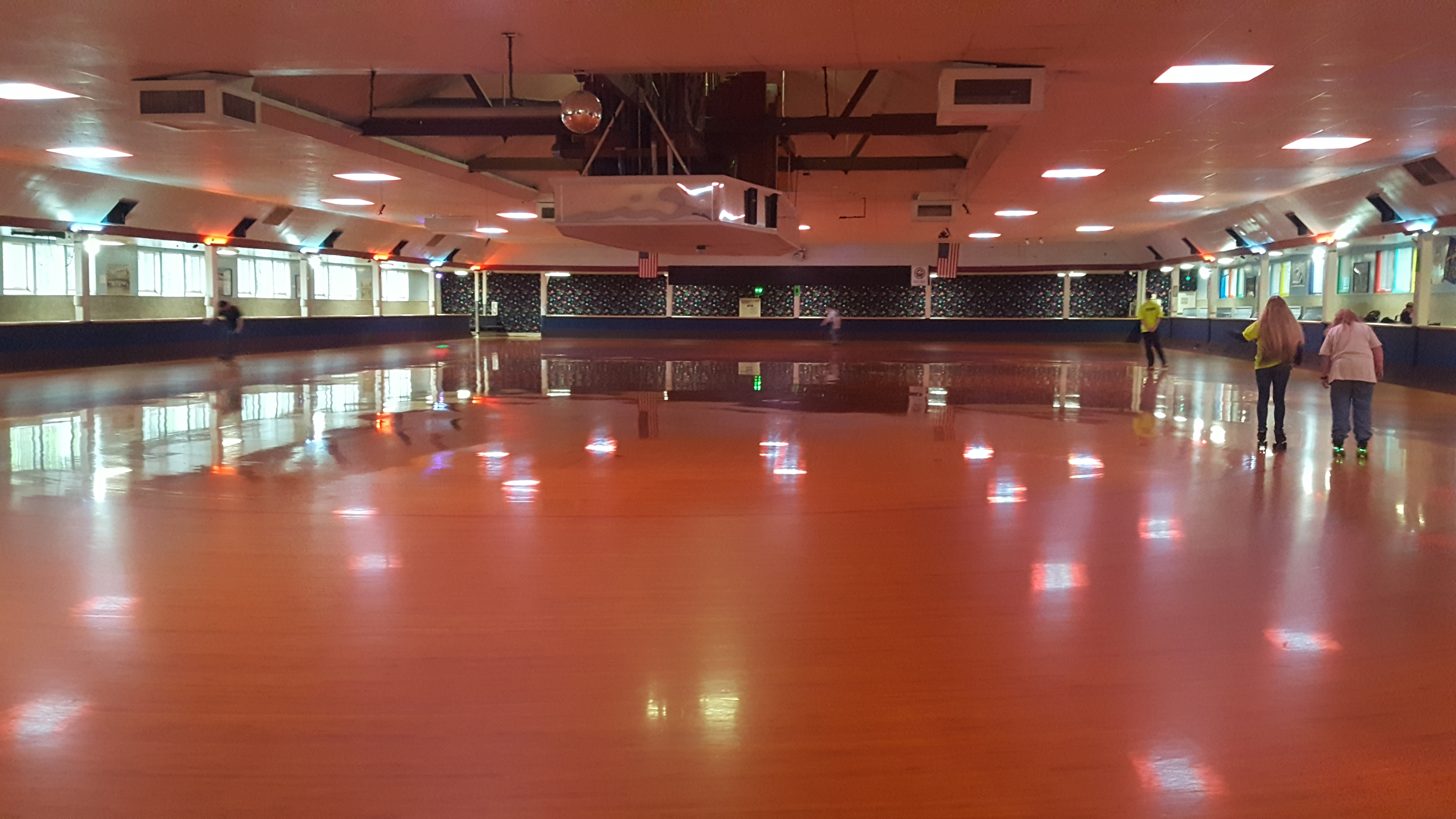
Interior, 2018

Dale and Jeanne Pritchard were longtime instructors at the rink.

In 2017, Damian Lillard and Adidas released a version of his "Dame 4" shoe, called "Glow in the Park", which was inspired by the rink.

Today, the Oaks Rink carries the tagline "Skaters Paradise" to accompany its 100 x 200 square foot (20,000 sq ft skating surface) Michigan maple floor and the last live Wurlitzer pipe organ to operate in a U.S. roller rink.

== Organ ==
From 1905 until an organ was installed, a live orchestra played from the balcony above the skating rink. In 1922, a William Woods (a local builder) theatre organ was installed. It began as a 2/5: two manuals and five ranks (rows of 61 pipes of similar timbre, each one a different size and pitch) and eventually became a 4/18. It was moved to a military base's roller rink in 1955; as of 2003 it was in a private home in Newport, Oregon. Some parts may have been retained at Oaks Park.

The current pipe organ was originally installed in 1926 at Portland's Broadway Theater, but had fallen into disuse since the early 1930s with the popularity of sound films. The Wurlitzer pipe organ was moved to Oaks Park skating rink in 1955. Keith Fortune has served as the rink's organist and "unofficial curator". Fortune has attended to the organ since 1989. The rink is the world's only location where visitors can skate to music provided by a live pipe organ, as of 2009.

== The Hangar ==
The roller rink has an annex, separate from the main rink, in a detached building roughly 200 feet east (and behind) the public rink. The oval flat track is used by the Rose City Rollers (women's roller derby) for practice and some tournaments.
