= Jupiter Hotel (Portland, Oregon) =

Hotel in Portland, Oregon, U.S.

- Logo

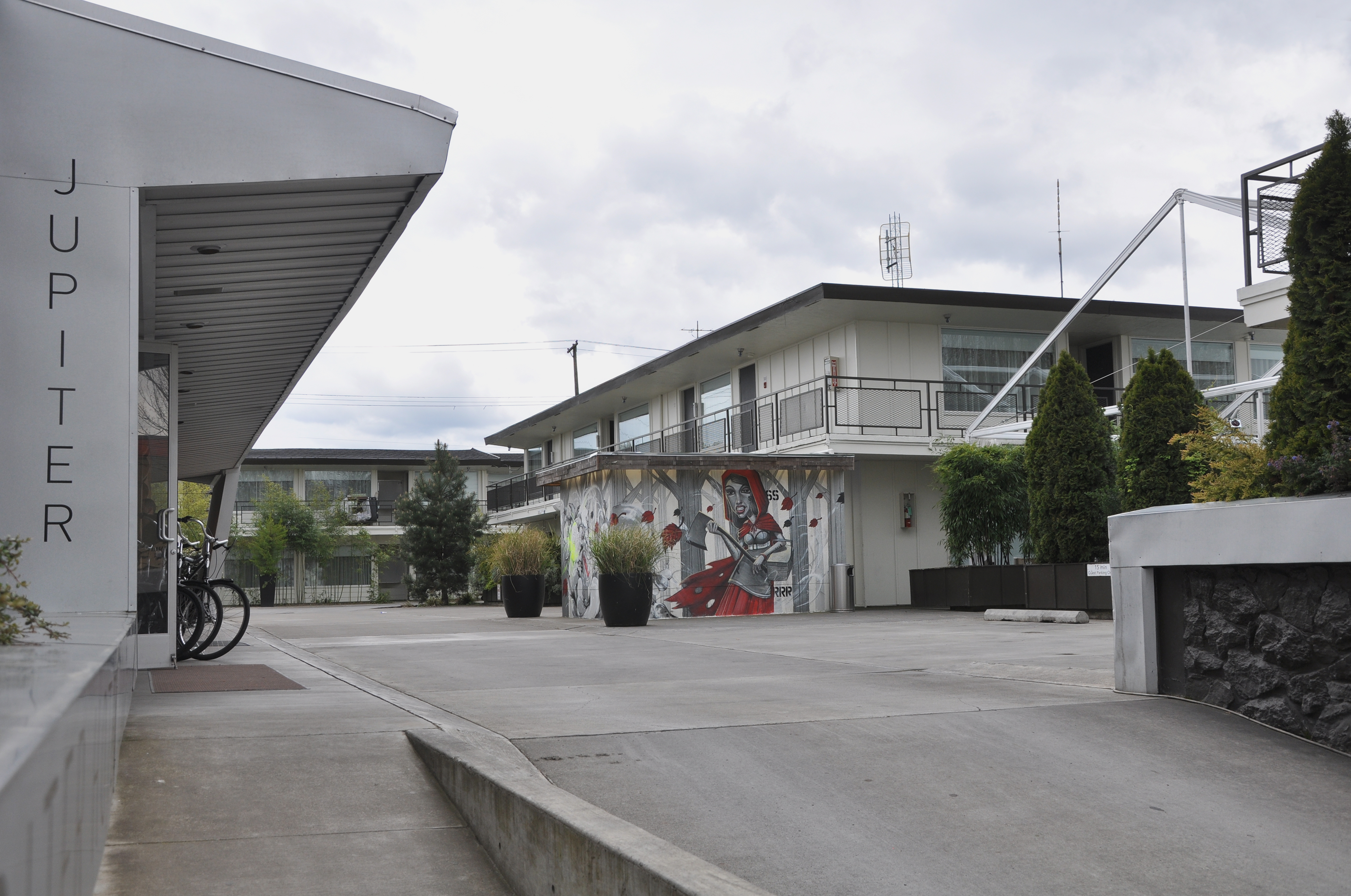
- Entrance to the hotel

General information
- Location: Portland, Oregon, U.S., 800 East Burnside Street
- Coordinates: 45°31′22.4″N 122°39′24.2″W
- Opening: October 2004

Other information
- Number of rooms: 148 (81+67)

Website
- jupiterhotel.com

The Jupiter Hotel is a boutique hotel consisting of set of two buildings located in Portland, Oregon, in the United States. A converted, 81-room mid-20th century motor inn Jupiter Original that opened in 2004 and a 67-room hotel Jupiter NEXT that was added across the street in 2018.

== Description ==
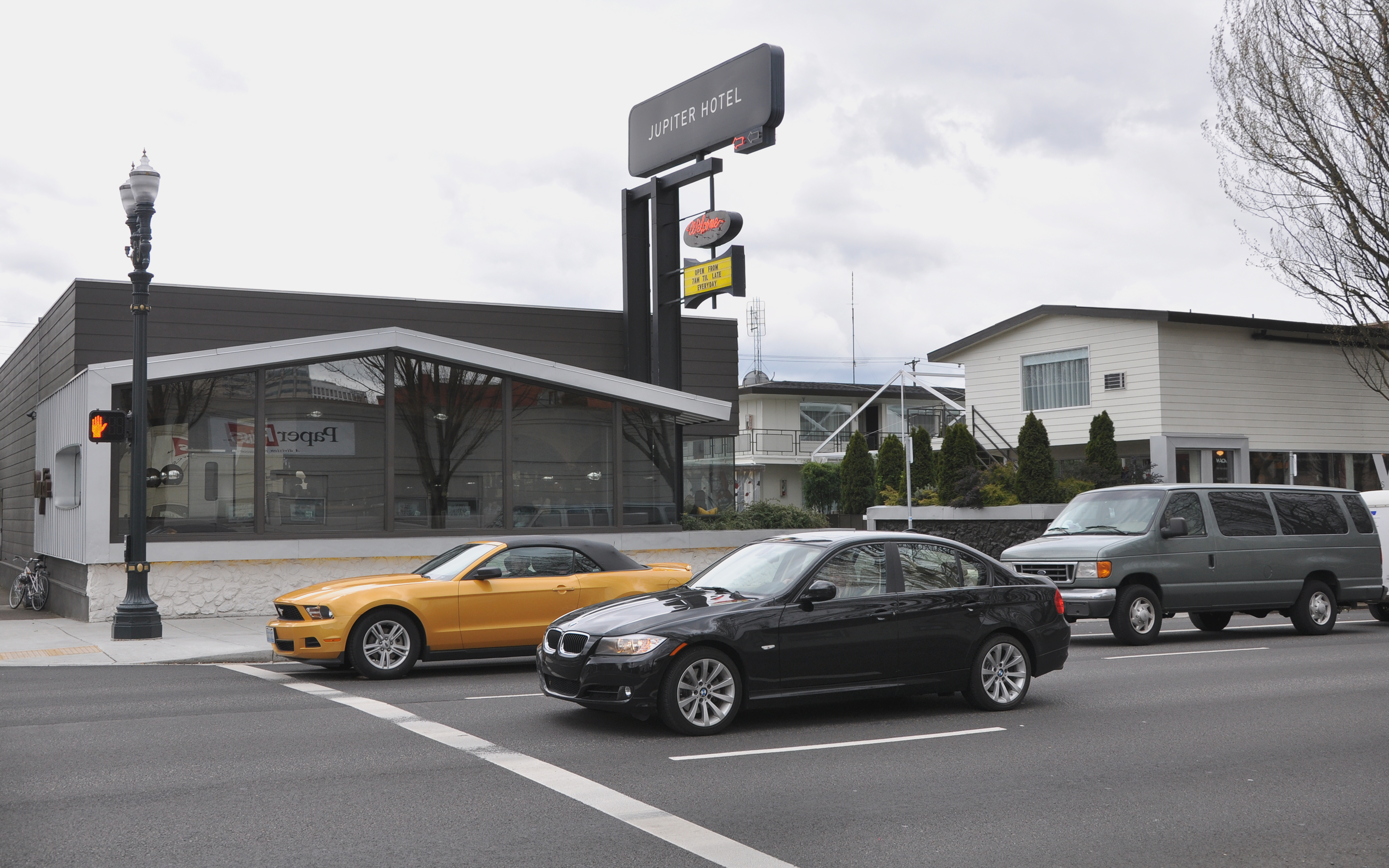
Jupiter Hotel in 2011

The hotel complex consists of two-story buildings that surround a central courtyard. The hotel has 81 rooms. In 2008, Fodor's described the Jupiter Hotel as a "hip" spot in Portland.

== History ==
The hotel was once a two-story 1960s motor lodge motel. After major renovations, it reopened as the Jupiter Hotel in October 2004. During its renovation, the old motel's parking lot was transformed into a courtyard and the entire building was painted white. All rooms were renovated and three event spaces were added.

The hotel is part of a larger effort to "revive" the area surrounding Burnside Avenue east of the Willamette River. In 2005, it was described as a "party hotel" and has been compared to the Standard Hotels in Los Angeles.

A second 67-room location opened across the street as Jupiter NEXT in 2018. They both continue to operate side-by-side.

From 2020 to 2022, unable to fill vacancies, it was used as an isolation shelter for homeless people. It was refurnished, then re-opened as a hotel under the new branding Jupiter Original. The Jupiter NEXT continued operating as a hotel during this period.

The hotel was home to Doug Fir Lounge for 19 years, which operated in its basement from 2004 to 2023. The vacant basement space is expected to be filled sometime in 2027 by a restaurant called Galleria & Grotto.

== Reception ==
The hotel ranked first in the "Best Hotel" category of Willamette Week's annual 'Best of Portland' readers' poll in 2006 and 2026.

== See also ==
- Hey Love (bar)
