= Masjid As-Saber =

Mosque in the United States

Coordinates: 45.45081°N 122.72189°W

Masjed As-Saber is one of the mosques in Portland, Oregon, United States and used to be the largest one in the metro area. The worship leader was Mohamed Sheikh Abdirahman Kariye who was mentioned frequently in the local news.

== See also ==
- Culture of Portland, Oregon
