= Alexis Campbell Starr =

American drag performer

- Born: Portland, Oregon, United States
- Occupation: Drag queen

Alexis Campbell Starr is an African-American drag queen based in Portland, Oregon. She is a resident cast member at Darcelle XV Showplace and has performed at CC Slaughters and other events and venues. She is active in the Imperial Sovereign Rose Court of Oregon and has been crowned Rose Empress.

== Early life ==
Alexis Campbell Starr was born and raised in Portland, Oregon.

== Career ==
Alexis Campbell Starr is a drag queen. She often performs to gospel hymns as well as secular pop and R&B songs. Andrew Jankowski of the Portland Mercury has described her as "rich with the diction and conviction of a saved woman–who might eat from the offering plate", as well as someone who does not "reach for easy Christian jokes, instead using proper church vocabulary to humorously address the congregated apostles and apostates".

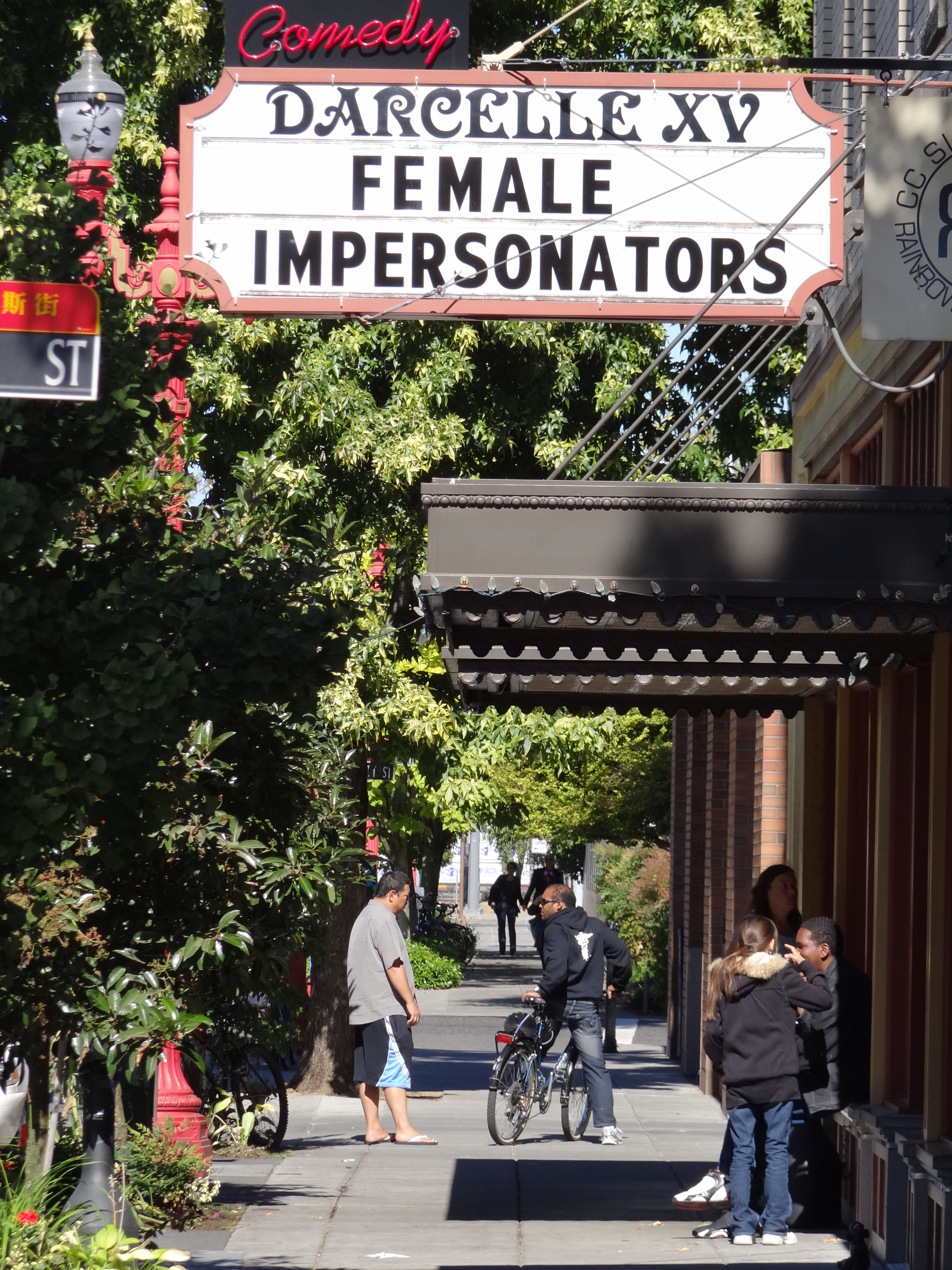
Alexis Campbell Starr is a resident cast member of Darcelle XV Showplace (pictured in 2012)

Alexis Campbell Starr is a resident cast member at Darcelle XV Showplace. In 2020, she began co-hosting a weekly drag brunch with Poison Waters at the venue; the series remains active, as of 2024. Alexis Campbell Starr has also toured with the cast outside Portland, including in The Dalles in 2022. She was among cast members who paid tribute to Darcelle XV, who died in 2023, during a memorial service at the Arlene Schnitzer Concert Hall. Alexis Campbell Starr performed to "Me, Myself, and I" (2003) by Beyoncé and other songs during Drag-a-thon, which was held at Darcelle XV Showplace in 2023 and set a Guinness World Record for the longest drag stage show.

Alexis Campbell Starr has performed at various other events and venues. In 2015, in conjunction with Pride Month, she was part of the cast of 'Big Gay Boat Ride', a Carla Rossi-hosted event aboard the Portland Spirit also featuring Heklina, Poison Waters, and Trixie Mattel. Alexis Campbell Starr hosted 'Testify Brunch', a weekly gospel-themed drag brunch at CC Slaughters, as of 2018. During the COVID-19 pandemic, Alexis Campbell Starr offered socially distanced performances; she was part of the 'Drag Delivered' series, which saw local artists perform in streets as privately hired events, and she also performed at Rooster Rock State Park. Alexis Campbell Starr performed in the 'Diva Drag Brunch' series at Bit House Saloon in 2021, and at an event about the history of Black drag in Portland at the Kennedy School in 2022, in conjunction with Juneteenth. She performed at Portland State University's annual Viking Days Drag Show in 2023.

Alexis Campbell Starr has worked with various LGBT businesses and community groups such as the defunct gay bar and nightclub Embers Avenue and the Imperial Sovereign Rose Court of Oregon. In 2024, she participated in a roast of Poison Waters; the comedy event was held at CC Slaughters and raised funds for a summer camp organized by CAP Northwest (formerly Cascade AIDS Project). Alexis Campbell Starr raises funds for HIV/AIDS research and patient support. She has been crowned Rose Empress.

== See also ==
- LGBTQ culture in Portland, Oregon
- List of drag queens
- List of people from Portland, Oregon
