= Mars (drag queen) =

American drag performer

- Occupations: Drag queen; event producer; performance artist

Mars is an American drag queen, performance artist, and event producer based in Portland, Oregon.

== Career ==
Between 2018 and 2020, Mars created, produced, and starred in the monthly series Haute Glue at Black Water Bar, which provided space for many transgender and genderqueer performance artists to explore their genders and creativity on stage, and was commemorated in the feature documentary Goodbye Haute Glue (2021).

Mars began collaborating with fellow drag artist Max Little in 2019, with their first co-production of a drag reimagining of the musical Little Shop of Horrors, as "Little Punk Rock Drag Show of Horrors". Since 2021, she has been creating and performing in the experimental variety web series with her collaborators, Magic Night at the Trans Bar with Max and Mars and Given and Urks and Friends! The show has been described as "an unapologetically queer (trans and weird) take on Tim & Eric's absurdist humor". In June 2024, the four drag artists were featured at Lincoln City, Oregon's first Pride festival.

Mars was one of dozens on performers and media personalities who participated in Drag-a-thon, the successful attempt at setting a Guinness World Record for the longest drag stage show, held during July 10–12, 2023, at the drag venue Darcelle XV Showplace. According to reporter Courtney Vaughn, "Mars is an absolute sexpot, rocking auburn '70s hair to Heart's "Magic Man." No one will ever be as sexy as Mars, so get over it now."

Through Max & Mars Present, she has been producing the "high concept" two-year long series "Space:The Drag Show", in which she portrays the planet and goddess Mars.

== Personal life ==
Mars has been in an off-stage collaboration and romantic relationship with co-producer Max Little since 2019. She is transgender.

== See also ==
- LGBTQ culture in Portland, Oregon
- List of drag queens
- List of LGBTQ people from Portland, Oregon
- List of people from Portland, Oregon
