= Isaiah Esquire =

American entertainer

- Born: Isaiah Tillman
- Occupation: Burlesque performer, Drag performer
- Years active: c. 2013–present (BOYeurism)
- Known for: Co-creator of the burlesque show BOYeurism
- Notable work: BOYeurism (burlesque show); Burlesque: Heart of the Glitter Tribe (film appearance)
- Style: Burlesque, drag
- Partner: Johnny Nuriel (performing partner)

Isaiah Esquire is the stage name of Isaiah Tillman, a burlesque and drag performer.

== Career ==
Isaiah Esquire appears in the film Burlesque: Heart of the Glitter Tribe.

In 2020, Isaiah Esquire ranked number 43 in a global top 50 list of burlesque performers. Isaiah Esquire was also included in the 2021 list. Isaiah Esquire performed in Drag-a-thon, a record-setting drag show at Darcelle XV Showplace in 2023. In 2025, Isaiah Esquire was one of two drag artists who performed at the Oregon House of Representatives.

== Personal life ==
Tillman is based in Portland, Oregon and uses the pronouns they/them. Tillman and their partner Johnny Nuriel perform in the burleque show BOYeurism, which the duo started in 2013. The couple performs as IZOHNNY.

== See also ==
- LGBTQ culture in Portland, Oregon
- List of LGBTQ people from Portland, Oregon
