= Drag-a-thon =

2023 drag show in Portland, Oregon, U.S.

- Promotional poster for the event
- Date: July 10–12, 2023
- Venue: Darcelle XV Showplace
- Location: Portland, Oregon, U.S.; 45.5248°N 122.6733°W
- Type: Drag show
- Organised by: Darcelle XV Showplace; Eden Dawn; Emma Mcilroy; Poison Waters; Wildfang
- Participants: 60 performers; 60 emcees
- Outcome: Guinness World Record for the longest drag stage show

Drag-a-thon was a drag show held during July 10–12, 2023, at the drag venue Darcelle XV Showplace in Portland, Oregon. The event was a successful attempt at setting a Guinness World Record for the longest drag stage show. Drag-a-thon was conceived and produced by Emma Mcilroy, co-founder of Wildfang, in response to the Tennessee Adult Entertainment Act and similar anti-drag legislation across the United States. Eden Dawn, the host venue Darcelle XV Showplace, and its longtime performer Poison Waters were also credited as co-organizers. Drag-a-thon was also a fundraiser, yielding approximately $290,000 for LGBTQ support service The Trevor Project.

Participants included RuPaul's Drag Race contestants Eureka O'Hara, LaLa Ri, and Peppermint, as well as Fred Armisen, spouses Lance Bangs and Corin Tucker, spouses Janine Brito and Paula Pell, Carrie Brownstein, Cameron Esposito, Laura Gibson, Frankie Grande, Punkie Johnson, Meghan Klingenberg, Stacy London, Sarah Marshall, John Cameron Mitchell, Katelyn Ohashi, Busy Philipps, members of the band Portugal. The Man, and Cheryl Strayed.

The sold-out show saw 2,500 tickets distributed for 160 seats, with admission also possible via stand-by. The event featured 600 songs and 700 set changes, and set a new record of 48 hours, 11 minutes, and 30 seconds. Among audience members was Multnomah County Commissioner Jessica Vega Pederson. RuPaul and Earl Blumenauer congratulated organizers and participants for their efforts.

== Background and development ==
=== Organizers and planning ===
Drag-a-thon co-organizers

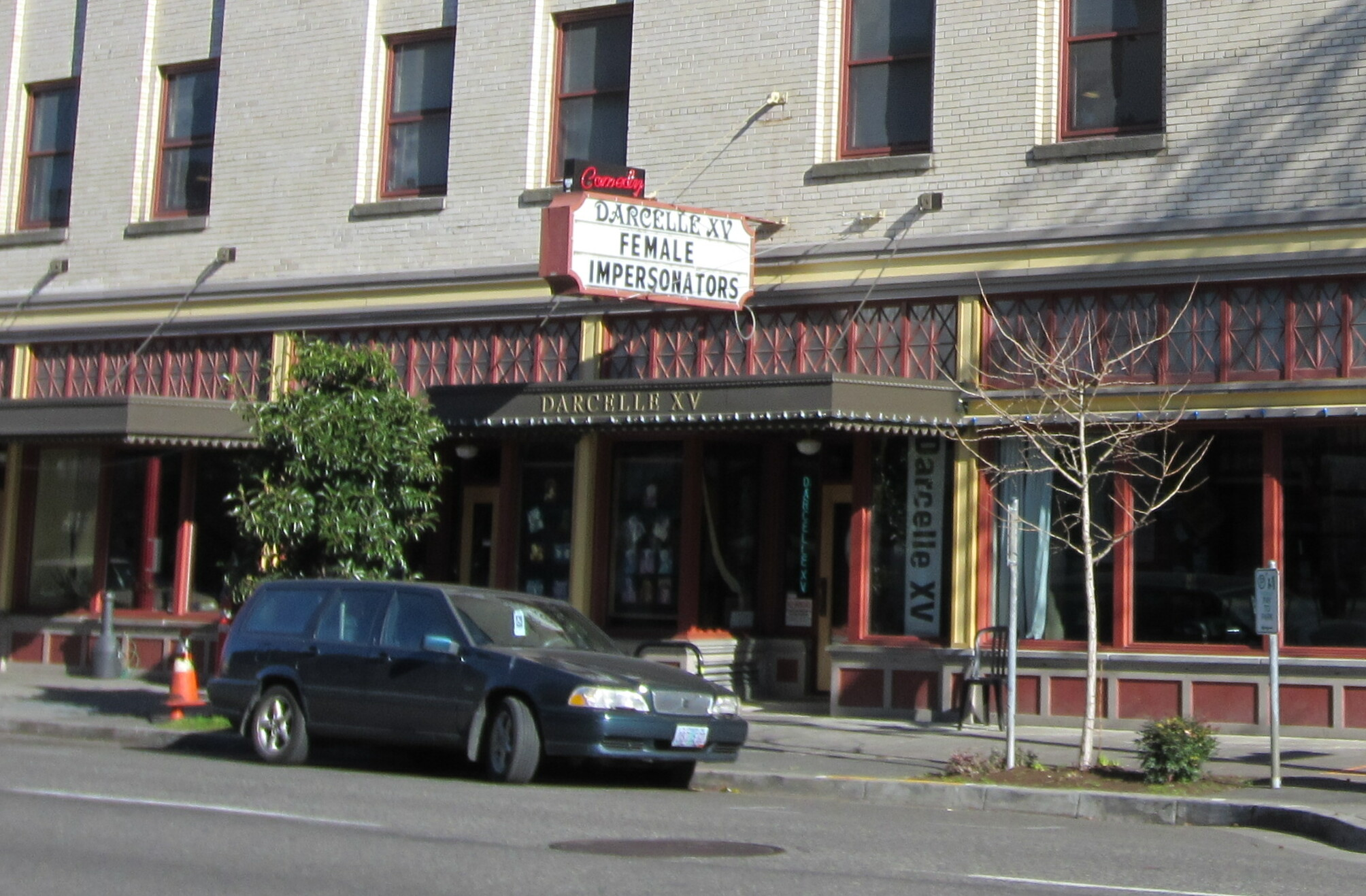
Host venue Darcelle XV Showplace

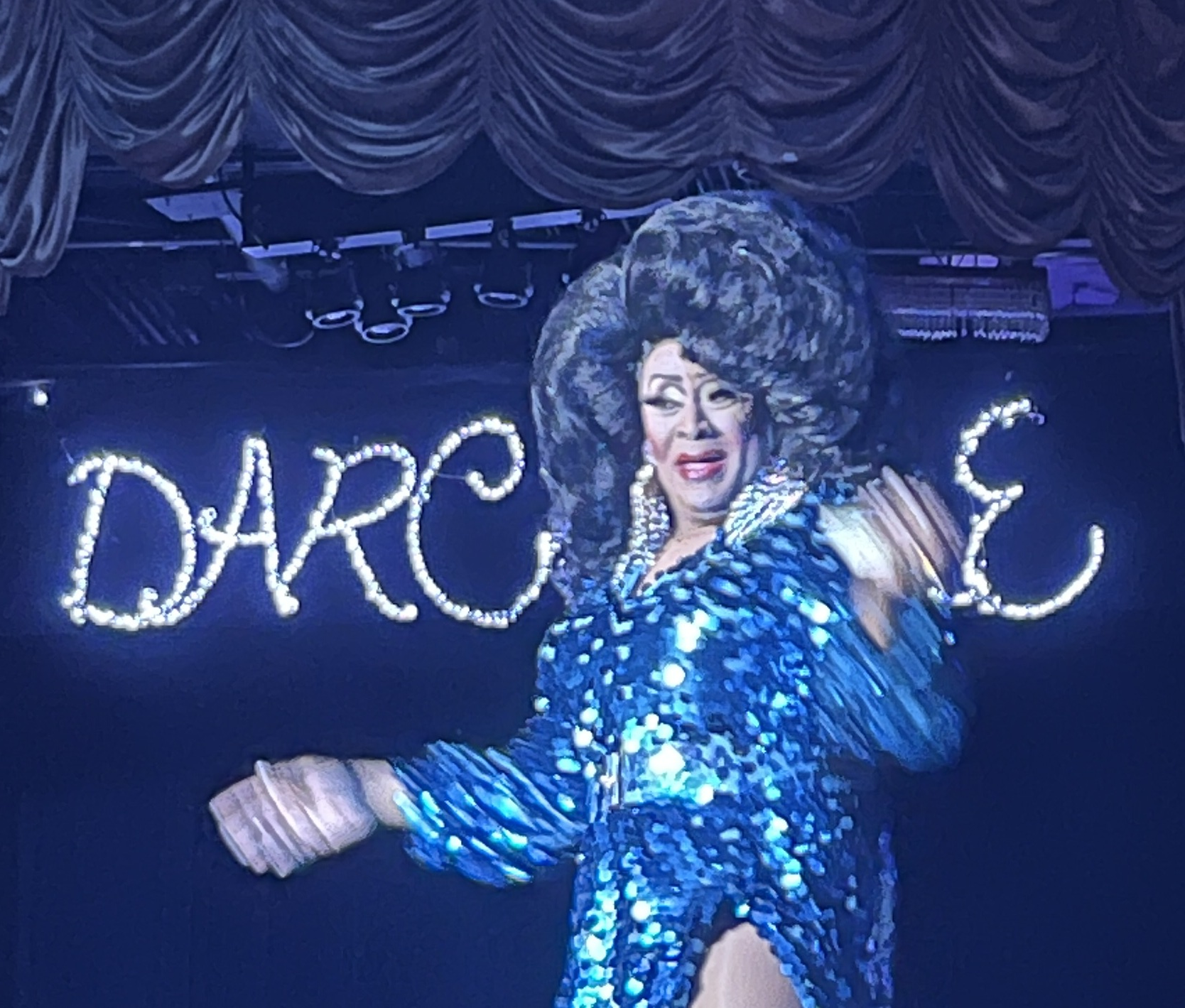
Drag performer Poison Waters

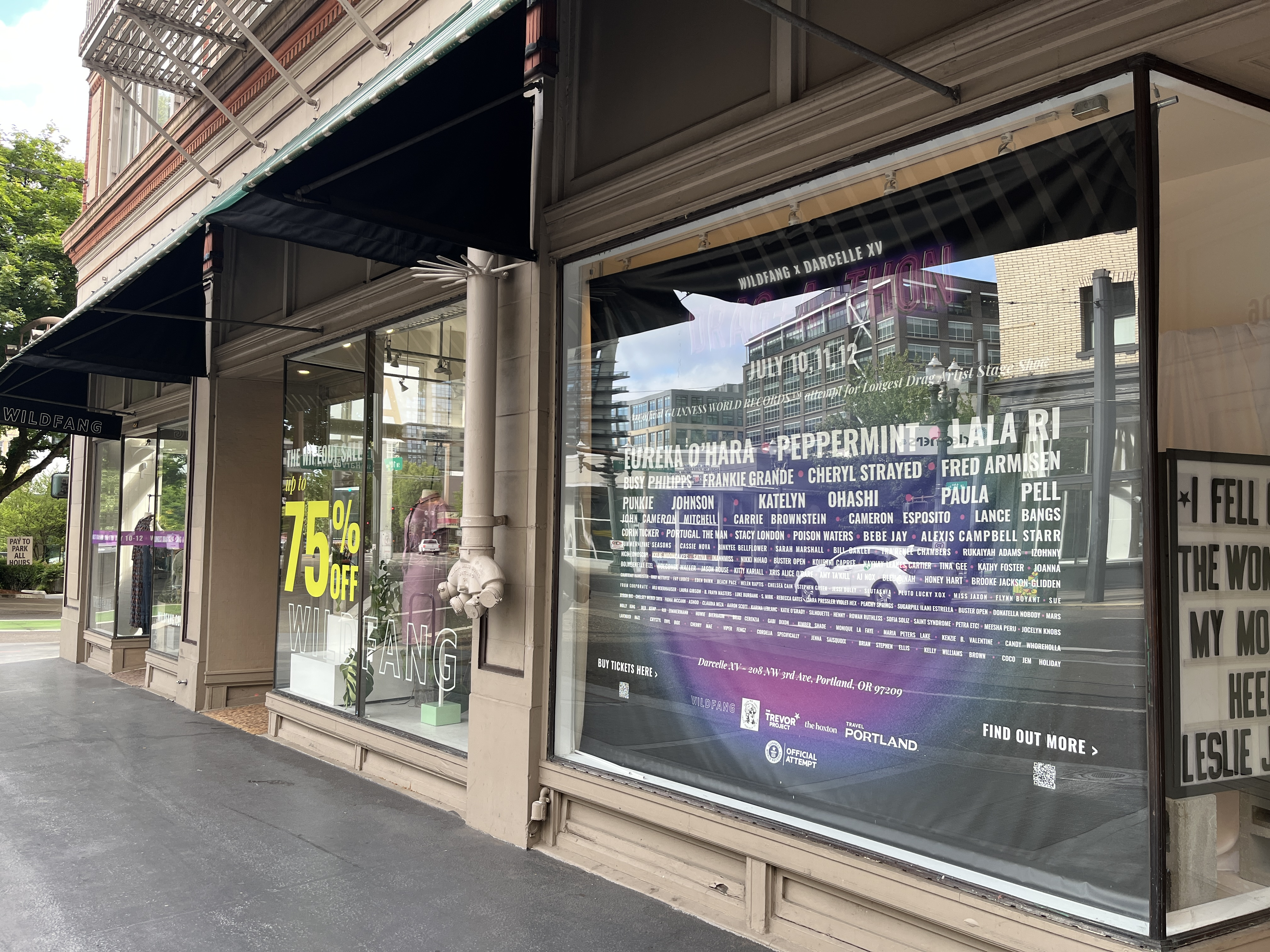
Wildfang store with event poster

The drag show Drag-a-thon was conceived and produced by Emma Mcilroy, co-founder and chief executive officer of local queer-friendly apparel company and boutique Wildfang, which operates a shop in downtown Portland. Mcilroy's co-organizers included journalist and podcast host Eden Dawn, who was also a senior producer, as well as the host drag venue Darcelle XV Showplace and its longtime performer Poison Waters. The event was organized in response to the Tennessee Adult Entertainment Act bill, and similar U.S. anti-drag bills, which prevent public adult cabaret performance in public or in front of minors. Drag-a-thon was also a fundraiser, seeking to raise $250,000 for The Trevor Project, a nonprofit organization whose mission is to end suicide among LGBTQ youth.

Poison Waters began working on the show in mid March 2023, and was promoting Drag-a-thon by June. At the start, the event was intended to raise funds for The Trevor Project and drag queens in U.S. states impacted by anti-drag bills. Public relations coordinator Evie Smith Hatmaker said the event "celebrates Portland's queer community and spotlights its ongoing struggles". Tickets for 130 seats sold out, but spectators were encouraged to use the stand-by ticket line.

Ahead of the show, Chiara Profenna of The Oregonian described Drag-a-thon as "one of the largest drag events in the world", and KATU said the event was "to honor a drag queen icon, fight back against hate and break a Guinness World Record, all at the same time". According to Dawn, the host venue's namesake Darcelle XV (who became a Guinness World Record holder as the oldest drag queen performer in 2016) blessed Drag-a-thon prior to her death. One news affiliate described the event as an "unofficial kick off to Portland's Pride week".

=== Guinness World Record ===
Drag-a-thon was scheduled to span 48 hours from 4pm on July 10 to 4pm on July 12, 2023, in an attempt at setting a Guinness World Record for the longest drag stage show. The previous record of 36 hours, 36 minutes, and 40 seconds, was set in Melbourne, Australia in 2017, and included 88 performers and approximately 350 songs. There were specific requirements for setting a new record. According to the Portland Mercury, artists were required to perform "within fixed windows of time (no less than two minutes, no more than ten)" and had to "switch out after every set". Additionally, organizers had to have "at least 25 people in the audience at any one given time", so tickets were sold for two-hour seatings.

== Participants and performances ==
In addition to organizers and venue staff, 60 performers and 60 emcees participated, including RuPaul's Drag Race contestants Eureka O'Hara, LaLa Ri, and Peppermint, as well as Busy Philipps.

=== July 10 ===
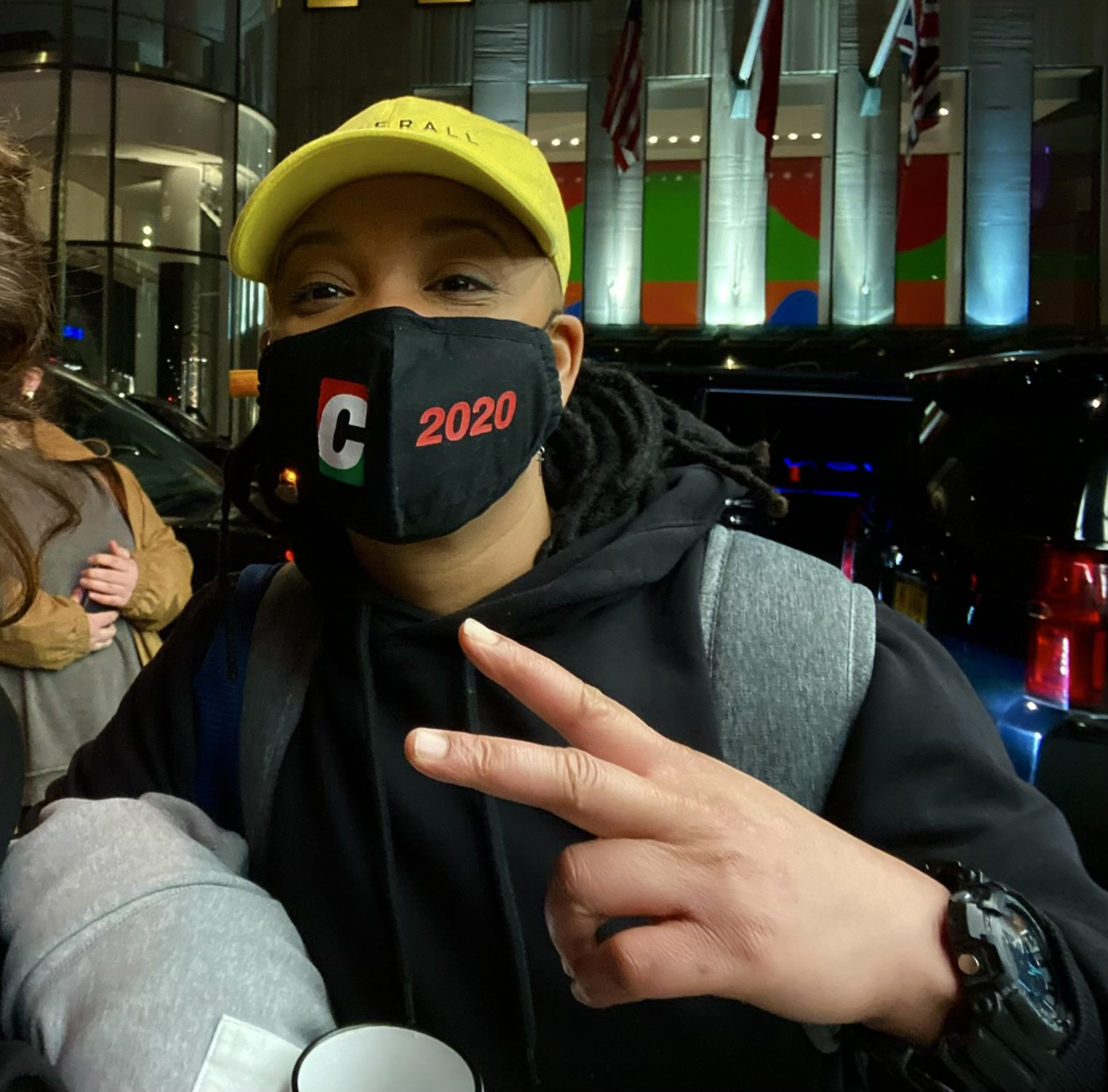
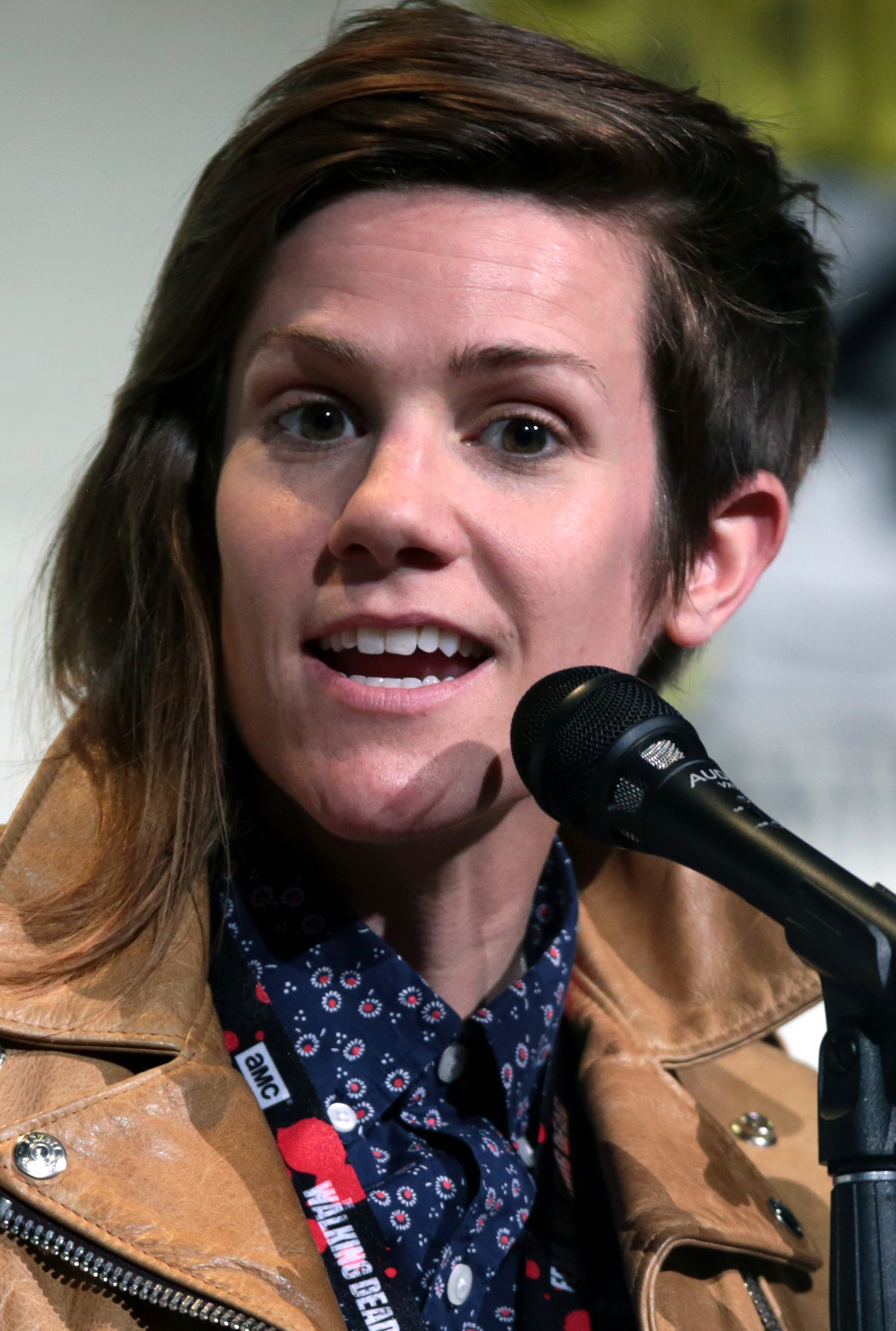
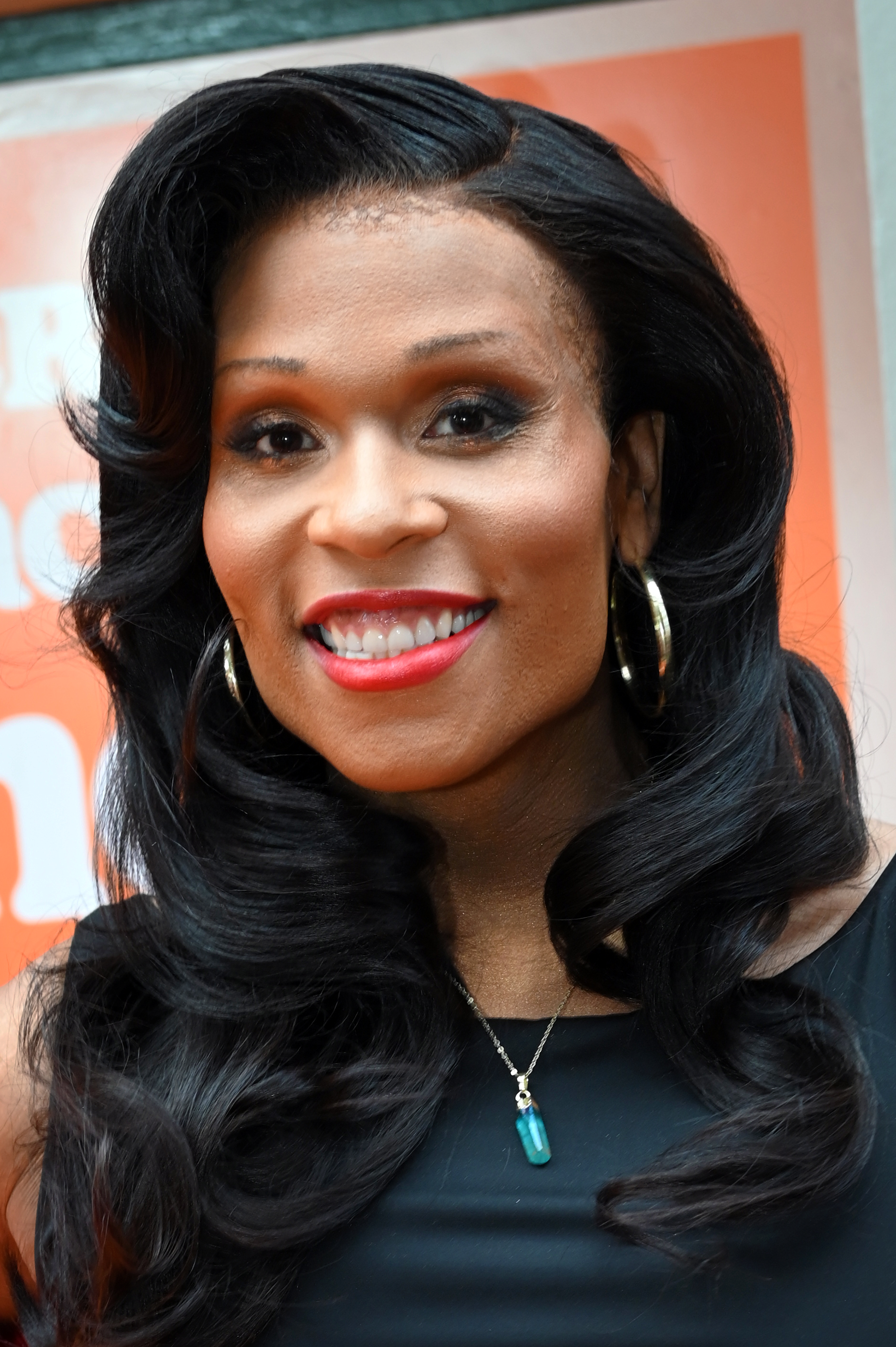
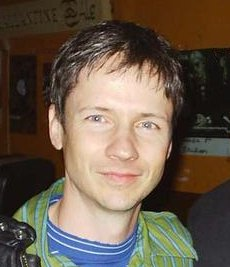
Opening night participants (pictured clockwise) Punkie Johnson, Cameron Esposito, John Cameron Mitchell, and Peppermint.

Dawn and Mcilroy opened the festivities and Poison Waters kicked off the performances with a lip-sync to "A Lil' Ole Bitty Pissant Country Place" by Dolly Parton. Venue staff joined her on the stage. Following comedian Punkie Johnson's turn as emcee, a Hillsboro city council member and actress Cameron Esposito co-hosted. Peppermint lip-synced to "Age of Aquarius" and performed her original song "Shady Phone" as well as "Dolla' in My Titty". Others performed to Robyn's "Dancing On My Own" (2010), Miley Cyrus' "When I Look at You" (2010), a monologue from the 2000 film Erin Brockovich, and "I Am What I Am" from La Cage aux Folles (1983).

Isaiah Esquire and Johnny Nuriel of 'Izhonny' performed together and solo, the former to Nelly's "Hot in Herre" (2002) as well as "Party Up", and the latter to a song from The Rocky Horror Picture Show featuring live vocals. Johnny Nuriel displayed hula hoop work in a separate performance. The later evening saw a lip-sync to "And I Am Telling You I'm Not Going" (1982), as well as impersonations of the Disney characters Elsa from Frozen (2013), Scar from The Lion King (1994), and Cruella de Vil from One Hundred and One Dalmatians (1961). During his time on stage, John Cameron Mitchell said his drag name was Hell of a Bottom Carter.

=== July 11 ===
==== Morning ====
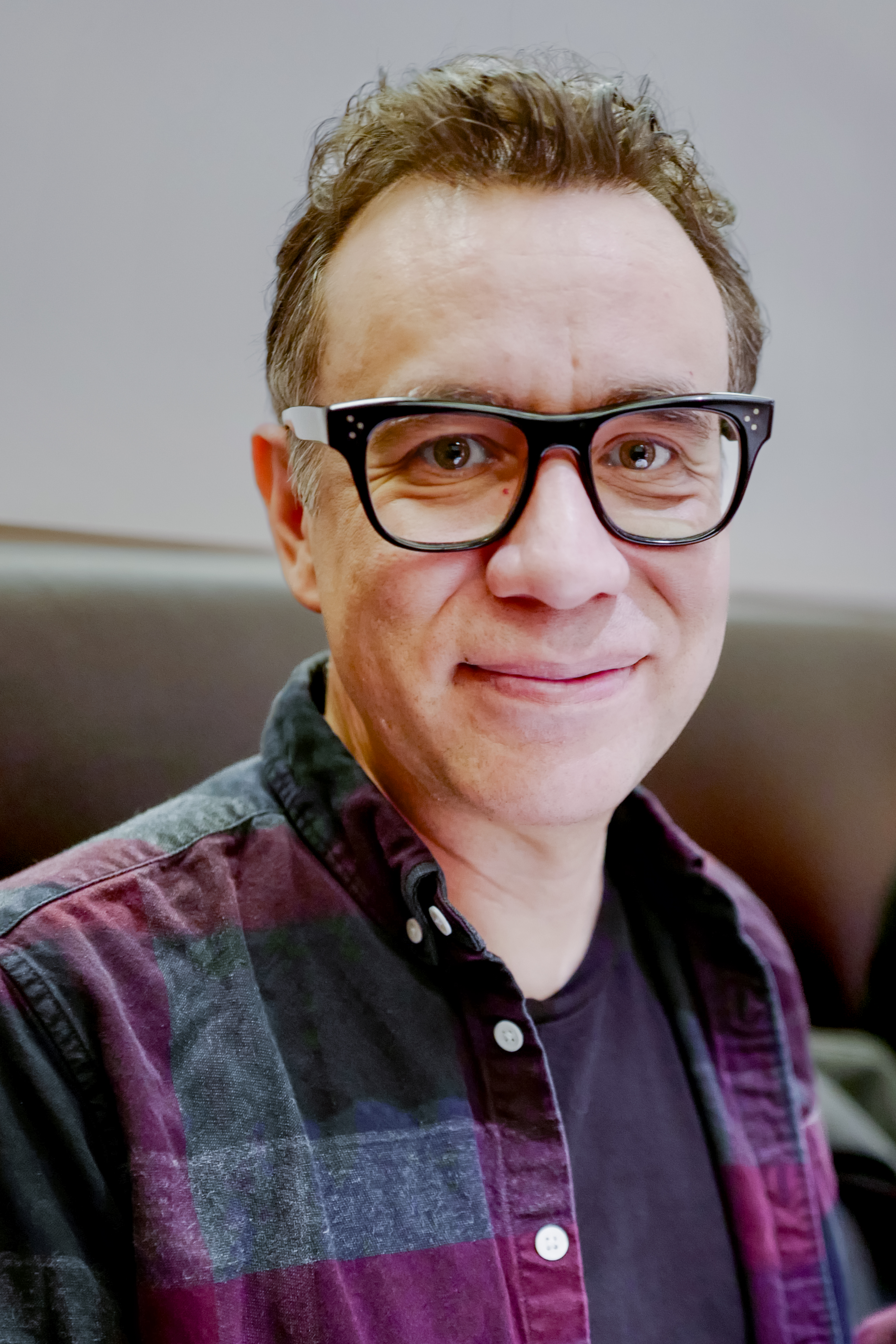
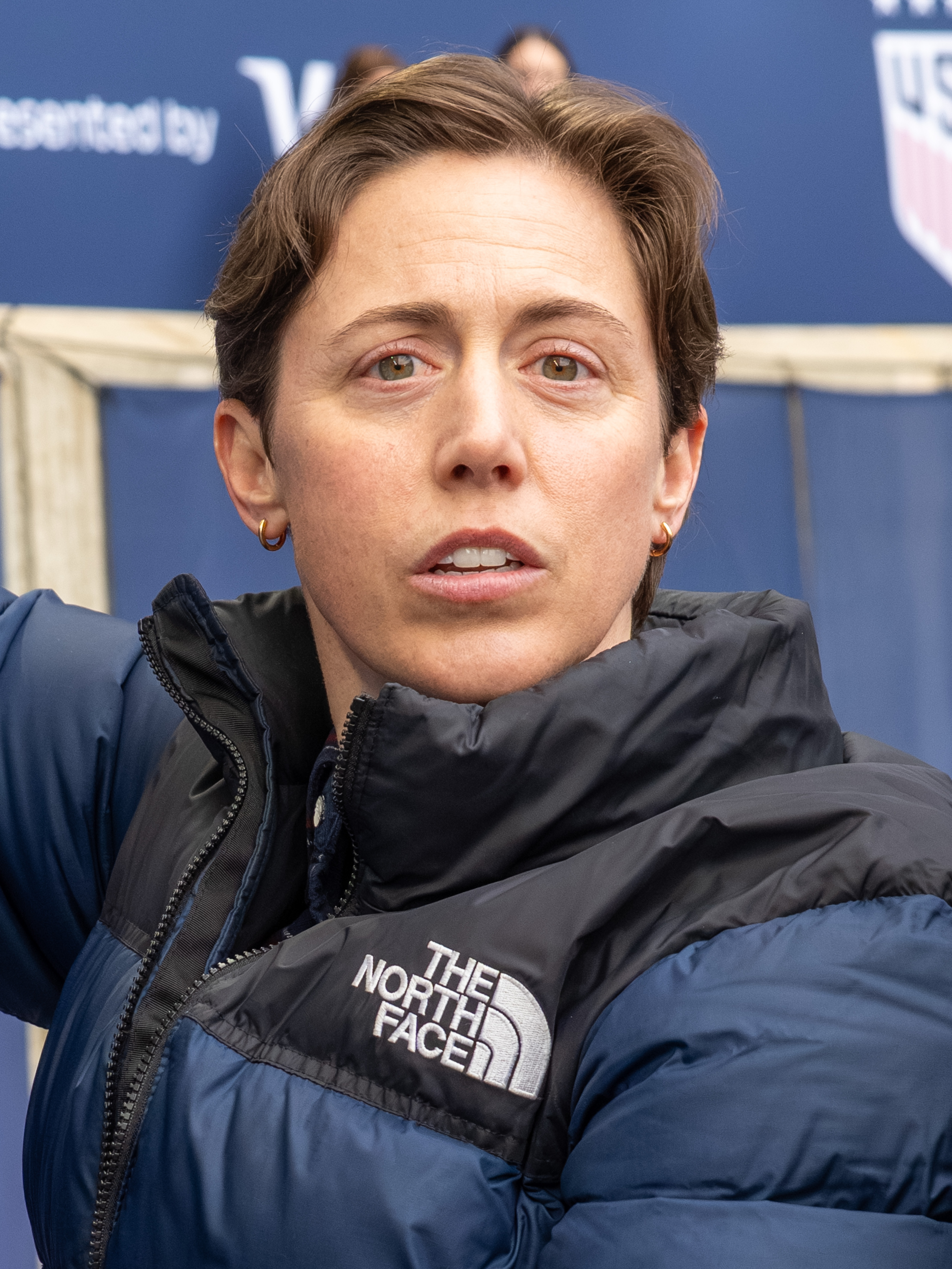
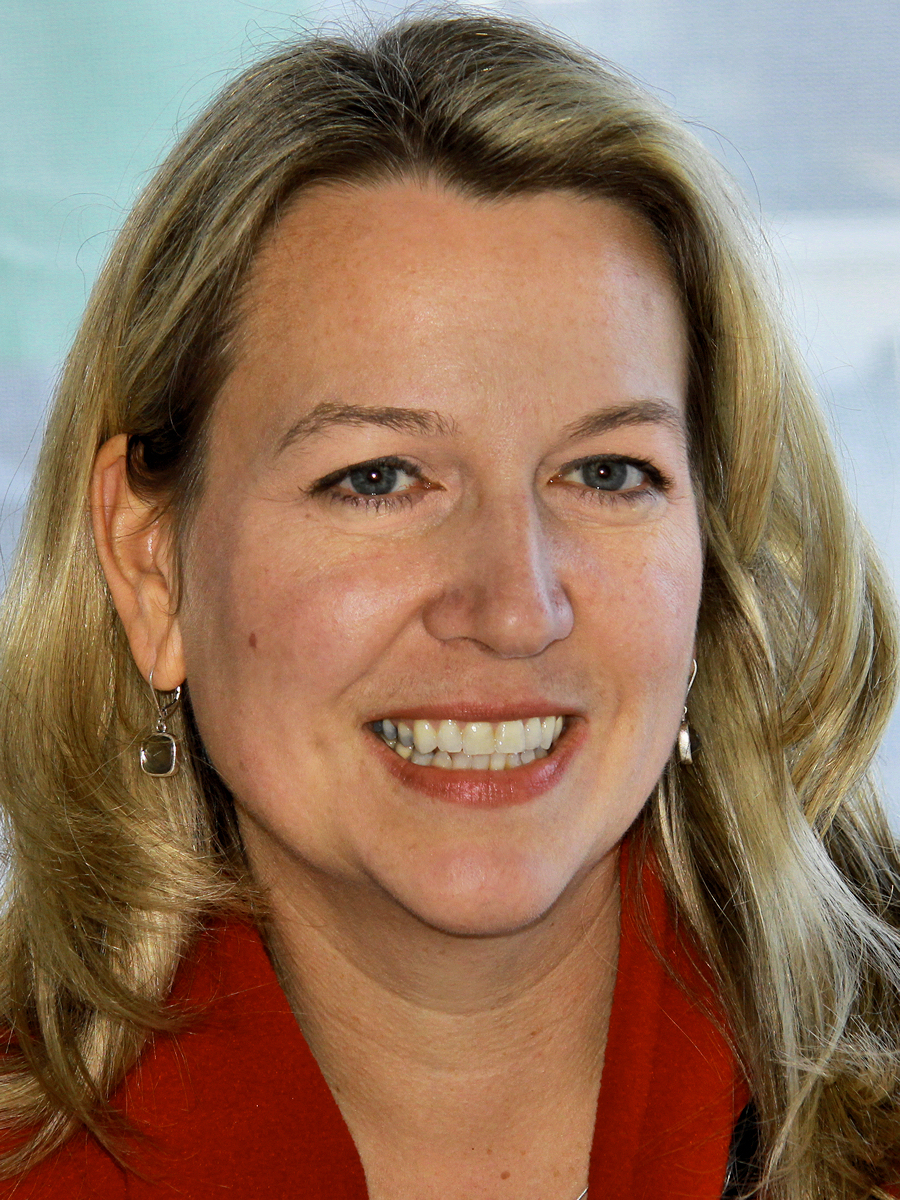
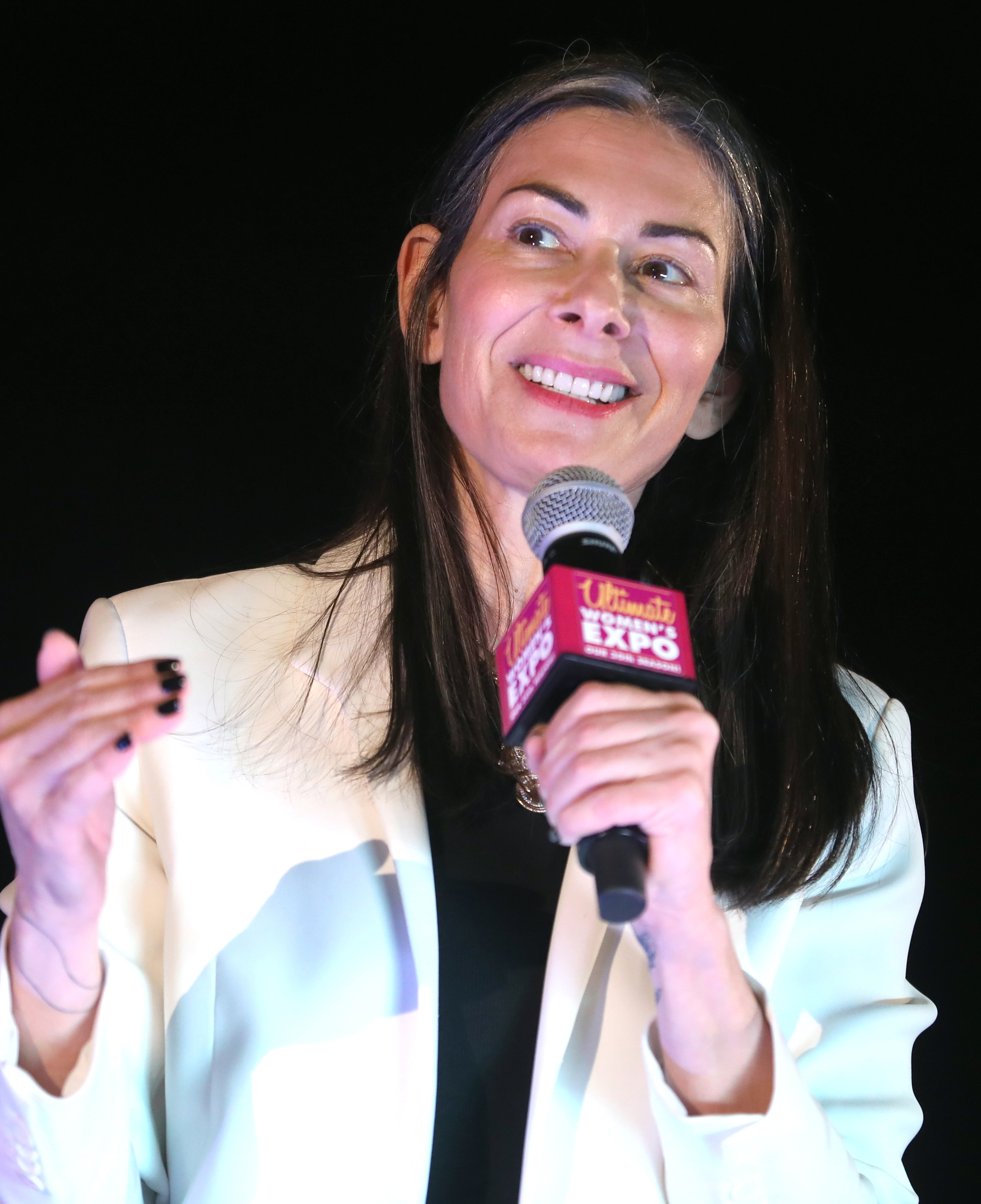
Among emcees on July 11 were (pictured clockwise) Fred Armisen, Meghan Klingenberg, Stacy London, and Cheryl Strayed.

The early morning of July 11 saw a nearly-nude performance to "This Is Me" by Kesha. Saint Syndrome ate a cup of yogurt and later performed to Parton's "Jolene" (1973). Innana Miss performed to a Celine Dion song which "morphed" into "WAP" (2020) by Cardi B. In between songs, Punkie Johnson asked audience members if they were queer. Kimber K Shade, Dawn's husband Ashod Simonian, and Mcilroy's wife Amy Taylor also hosted. Performers included Cassie Nova, Kourtni Capree, Lavender Haze, and Sugarpill. The Portland Mercury's Andrew Jankowski described "a pleather dominatrix, crooning and rapping drag kings, and a twirling laser fairy".

Later in the morning, artists performed to Katy Perry's "Rise" (2016) and "When I'm Gone" (2021), as well as pop songs, ballads by Bruno Mars and Shawn Mendes, and yodeling by Gwen Stefani. Kitty KariAll performed to "Let It Go" from Frozen and Andra Day's "Rise Up", during which she raised Black Trans Lives Matter and Stop Asian Hate signs. Hosts attempted to rouse the audience to Lady Gaga's "Applause". Portland Thorns FC defender Meghan Klingenberg and former Portland Monthly editor Fiona McCann were emcees, and other performers included Lucky, Pluto, and Jenna Saisquoix. The 6am hour started with a tribute to Carrie Fisher and later included acts to pop songs by Christina Aguilera, Dua Lipa, Liza Minnelli, Kim Petras, Britney Spears, and Barbra Streisand.

Poison Waters performed to ballads by Anita Baker, Toni Braxton, and Taylor Dayne. Later morning emcees included Fred Armisen, Stacy London, as well as local actors and business people. Cordelia Specifically delivered a live rendition of Frank Sinatra's "L.O.V.E.", and another performed to "Barbie Girl" (1997) by Aqua. Performers included Crystyl Jewyl Box, Flynn Boyant, and Petra Etc! Andrew Foran of KOIN reported on the morning of July 11 that the event showed "no signs of stopping".

==== Afternoon and evening ====
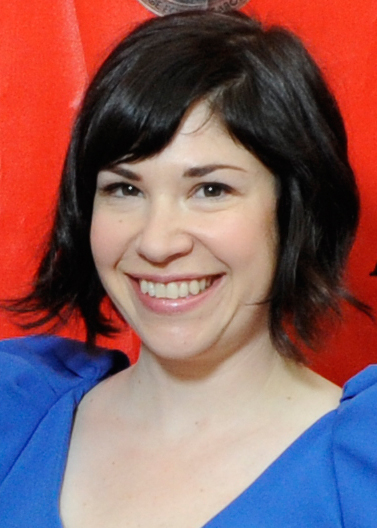
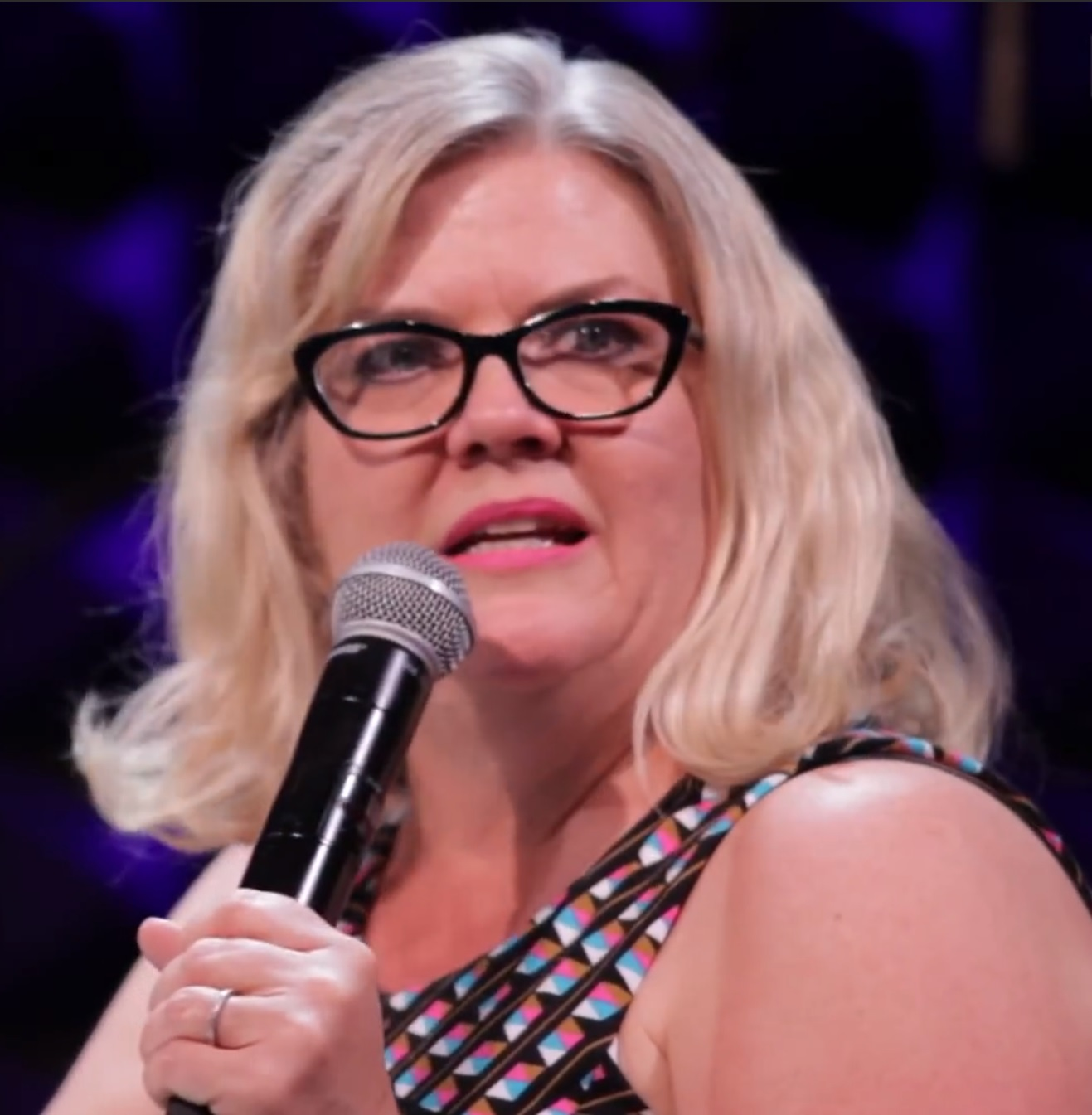
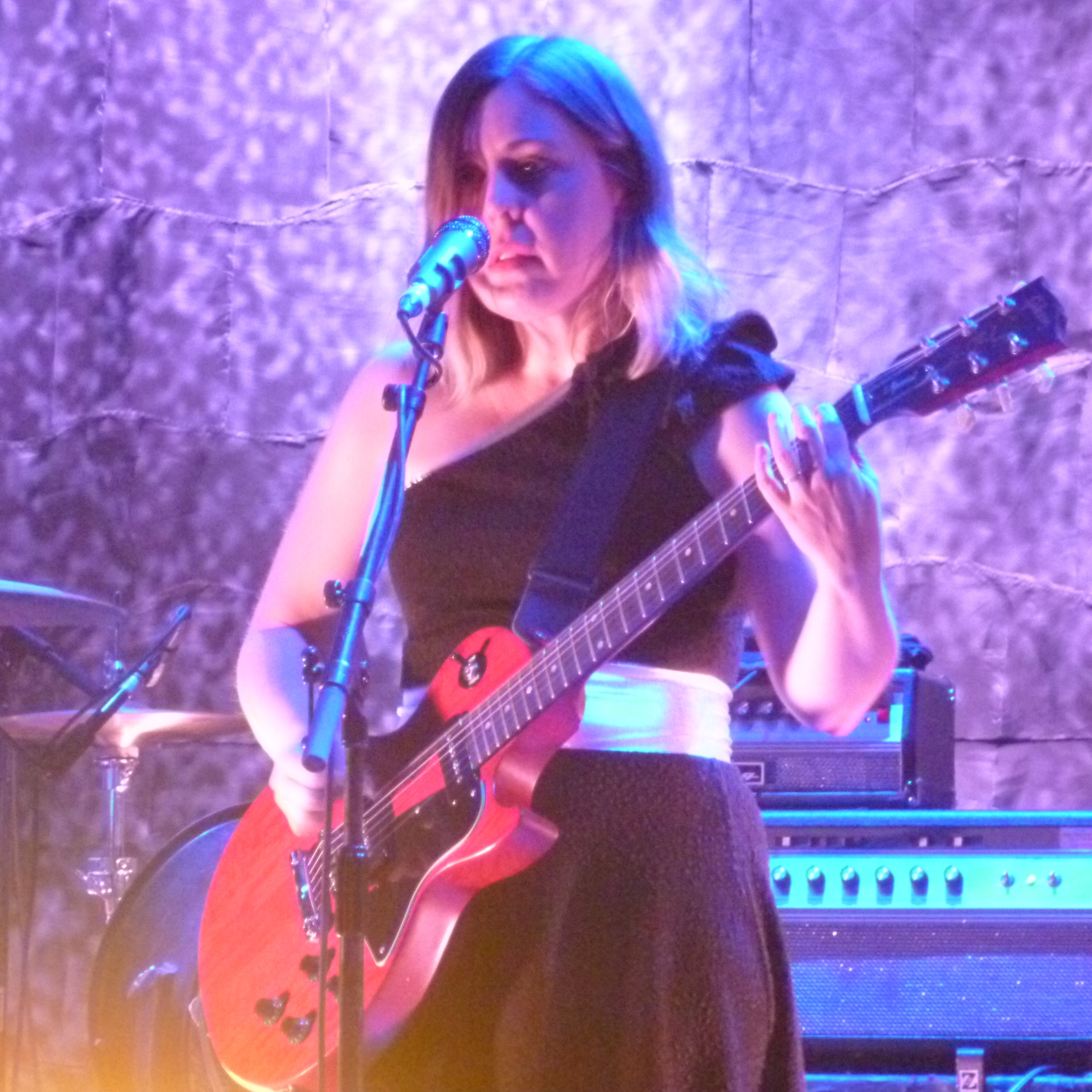
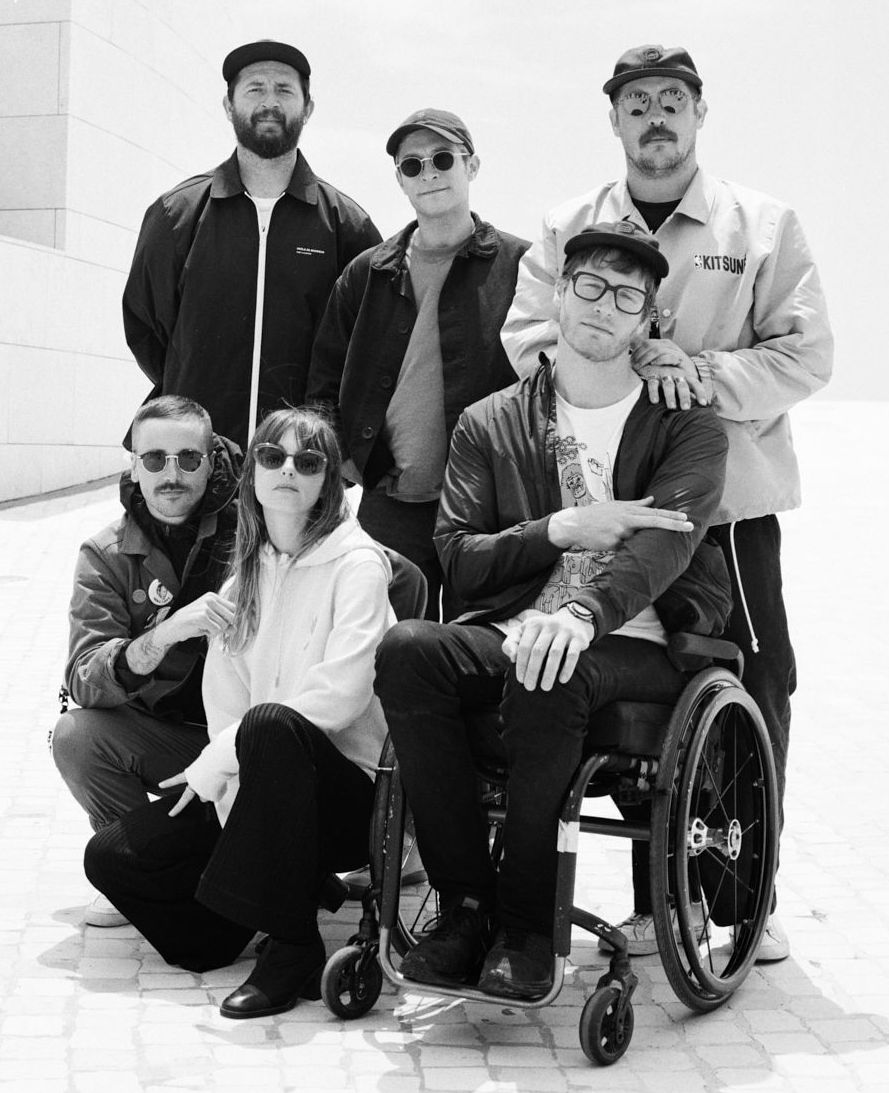
Hosts on July 11 included (pictured clockwise) Carrie Brownstein, Paula Pell, members of the band Portugal. The Man, and Corin Tucker.

Candy Whoreholla, Innana Miss, and Meesha Peru kicked off the afternoon line-up. The latter performed "high-energy" dances and Suzette Smith of the Portland Mercury said the trio "[breathed] life back into the marathon's energy levels". The newspaper's Taylor Griggs also praised the trio's performances of a Parton medley, a remix of "I Am What I Am", and a song by Caroline Polachek, and described the "vibe" as "high energy glam and a little manic". Cheryl Strayed emceed and told jokes she had found online.

Nicole Onoscopi sang Cyrus' "Flowers" (2023) and "Shake It Off" (2014) by Taylor Swift. Cassie Nova performed to "Let's Hear It for the Boy" (1984) by Deniece Williams, Viper Fengz showcased her dancing skills across multiple songs, and other performers offered renditions of "Despacito" (2017), Lady Gaga's "You and I" (2011), and Gretchen Wilson's "Redneck Woman" (2004). The Seattle-based performer Kylie Mooncakes wore a white dress with frills with matching cowboy boots and gloves. Mars, described by the Mercury's Courtney Vaughn as "an absolute sexpot, rocking auburn '70s hair", performed to "Hello Earth" by Kate Bush and "Magic Man" (1975) by Heart. AJ Nox performed to ABBA's "On and On and On" (1980) as well as "Kill v. Maim" by Grimes, wearing a yellow strapless miniskirt, thigh-high boots, and matching pleather gloves. Afternoon emcees included Paula Pell, Corin Tucker and her husband Lance Bangs, author Chelsea Cain, and members of the band Portugal. The Man.

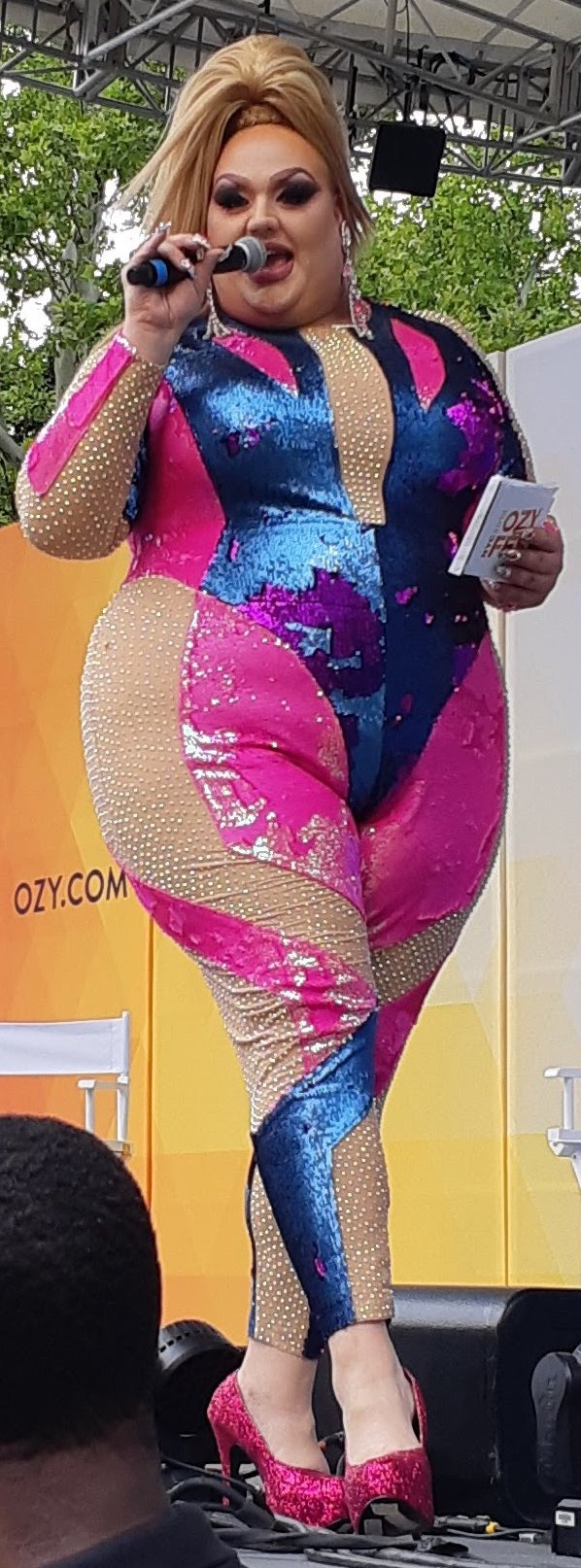
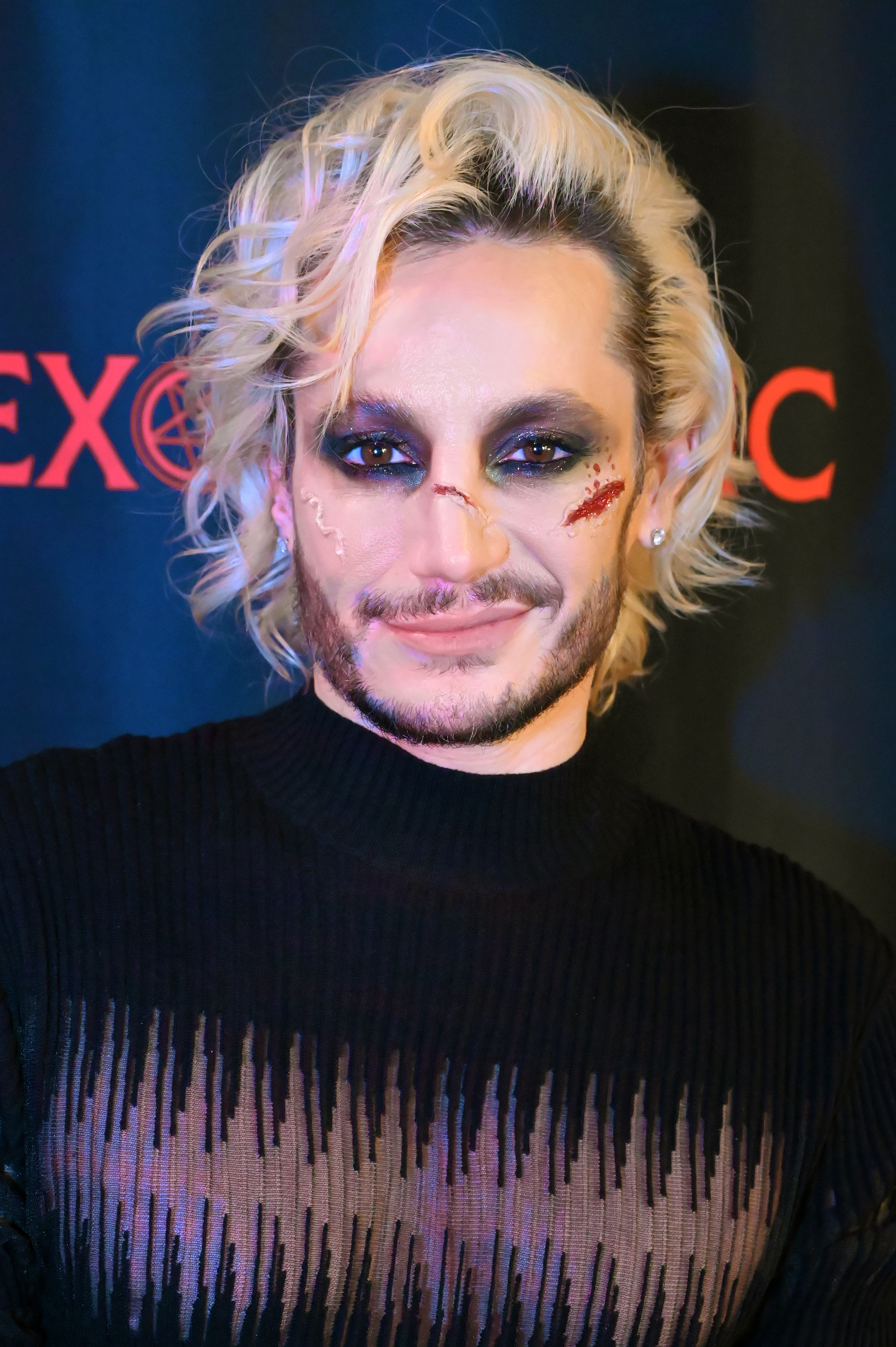
Eureka O'Hara (left) and Frankie Grande (right) performed a duet as Ursula and Ariel from the 1989 film The Little Mermaid, respectively.

In the evening, Kenzie B. Valentine performed to Dion's "My Heart Will Go On" (1997), and "trash talked" Rose for letting Jack die in the 1997 film Titanic. Other artists included Maria Peters Lake, who performed to a "remake" of "I'll Be Around" (1972) by The Spinners, and Viper Fengz, who wore a leather studded tube top during a set with Olivia Newton-John's "Hopelessly Devoted to You" (1978), "Scorpio" by Bebe Huxley, and Miss A's "Hush". Kenzie B. Valentine wore a Wham!-inspired outfit to "Diva's Lament" from Spamalot, and later lip-synced to "I Am Woman" by Emmy Meli. London, McIlroy, and Carrie Brownstein hosted.

Amy Ta'Kill did a split during "Untouched" by The Veronicas, and Montana-based drag king Buster Open performed to "Astronaut in the Ocean" (2019) by Masked Wolf. Other participants included Slutashia, from Eugene, and Alexis Campbell Starr, who performed to "Me, Myself and I" (2003) by Beyoncé. Pell's spouse Janine Brito also joined as a co-host. Later in the evening, Eureka O'Hara and Frankie Grande performed a duet as Ursula and Ariel from the 1989 film The Little Mermaid, respectively. Separately, Grande sang the film's song "Part of Your World", spoke about "the importance of the entire LGBTQ+ family to stand together", and told stories about Jennifer Coolidge. Eureka performed to "Easy on Me" (2021) by Adele. Approaching midnight, participants included Nicole Onoscopi, who performed to "Cotton-Eyed Joe" and "Baby Got Back" (1992), as well as Isaiah Esquire, Poison Waters, Alexis Campbell Starr, and Summer Lynne Seasons.

=== July 12 ===
Early morning hosts on July 12 included Eater Portland editor Brooke Jackson-Glidden and author Kelly Williams Brown. Bleu Dinah wore a cheetah print bodysuit during a lip-sync to a medley which included Shania Twain's "Man! I Feel Like a Woman!" (1999). Later, she danced to mix of Spears' "Oops!... I Did It Again…" (2000), her Pepsi commercial appearance, and "Stronger" (2000). Other artists were: Corvallis-based Cherry Mae; Mona Chrome, who vogued to "1991" by Azealia Banks; and Nicole Onoscopi, who featured Dion's "It's All Coming Back to Me Now" (1989). Candy Whoreholla did a cartwheel to Spears' "Work Bitch" (2013) and showcased interpretive dancing to "When I Grow Up" (2009) by Fever Ray. Slutashia performed a song she wrote for victims of the Orlando nightclub shooting (2016).

Pluto lip-synced to Kylie Minogue's "Padam Padam" (2023), sporting a "butterfly-studded" beard, and Lucky Xoxfurther performed to "Stars Are Blind" (2006) by Paris Hilton. Sue from Corporate lip-synced to "Boss Bitch" (2020) by Doja Cat mixed with audio clips of Michael Scott from The Office. Just before 5am, organizers said the previous world record was surpassed and $270,000 had been raised. Host Jess Duley led a "chair dance" to "Rain on Me" by Lady Gaga and Ariana Grande. Sue from Corporate returned to perform a mashup of "Angel" (1998) by Sarah McLachlan and "Welcome to the Black Parade" (2006) by My Chemical Romance, and Pluto did pull-ups to Cyrus' "Can't Be Tamed" (2010). Lucky, Poison Waters, and others featured songs by Eartha Kitt, Pink, Robyn, and Twain.

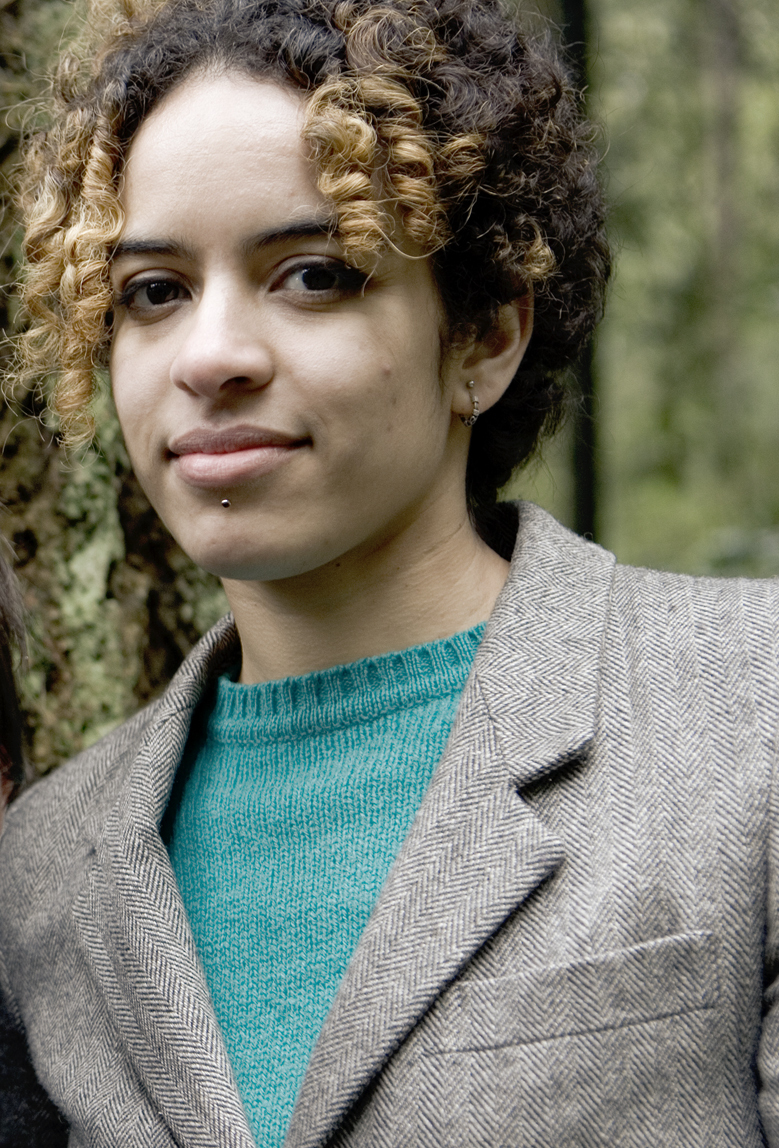
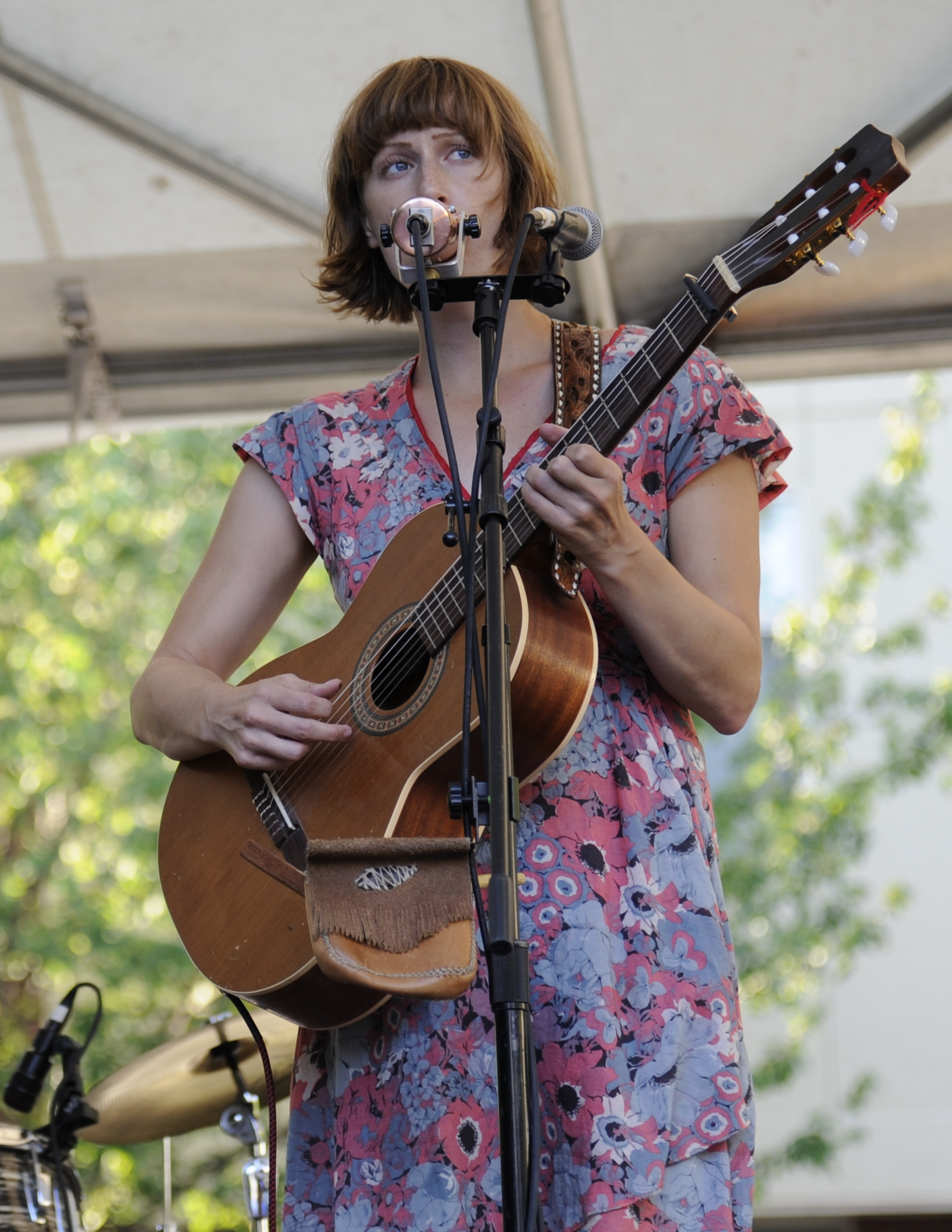
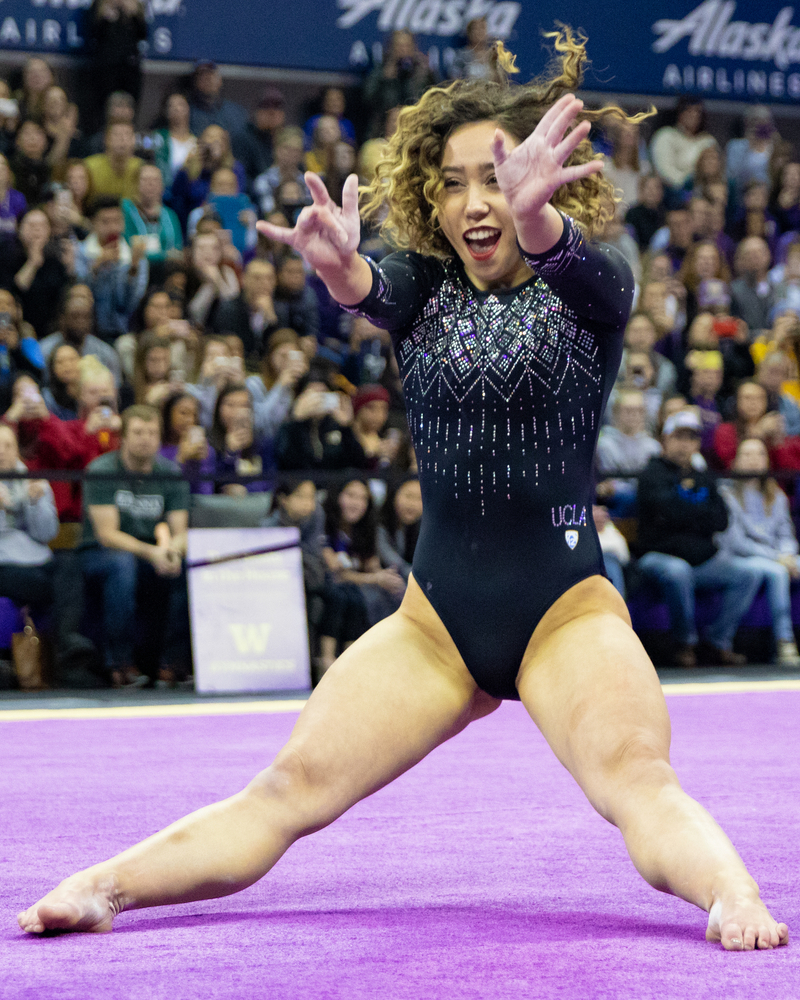
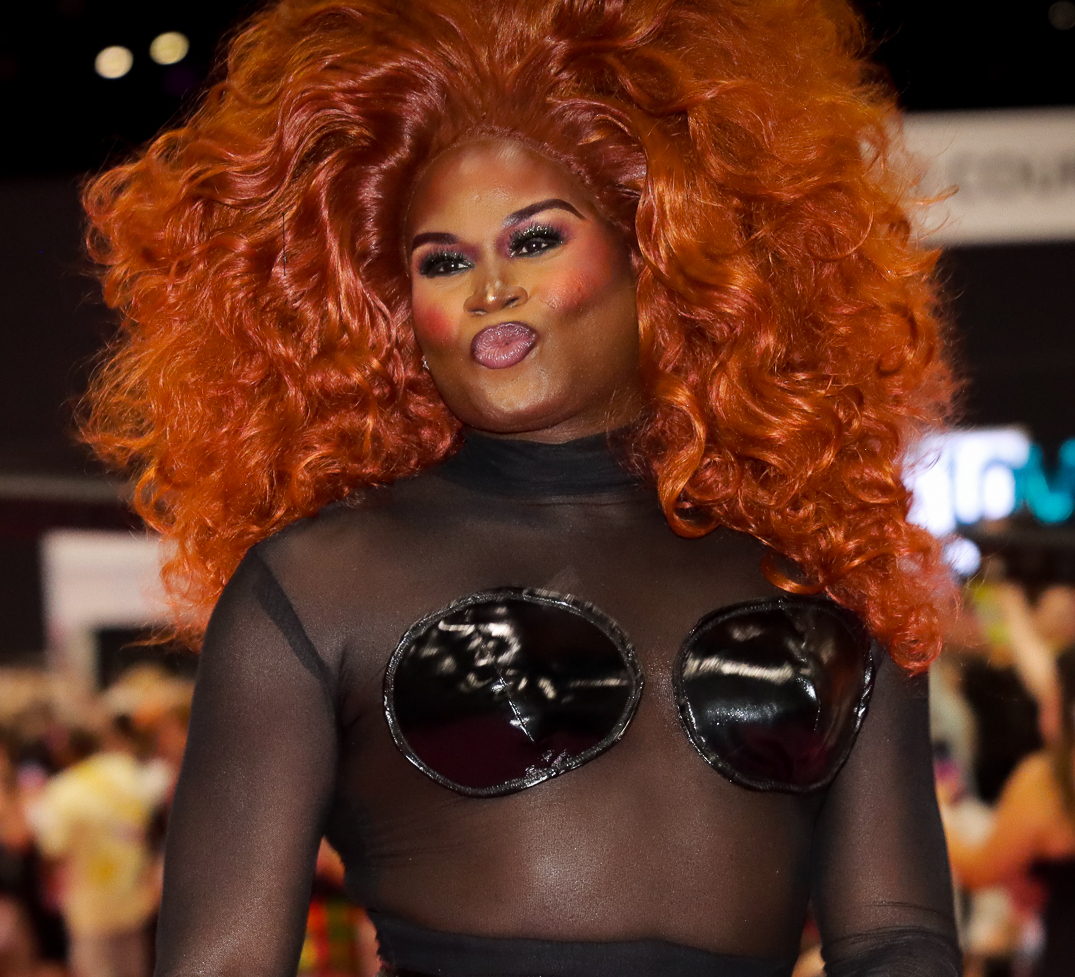
July 12 participants included (pictured clockwise) Kathy Foster, Laura Gibson, LaLa Ri, and Katelyn Ohashi.

Performances during the 6am hour included: Pluto, who performed to "Glamazon" (2011) by RuPaul; Lucky Xox, who wore rhinestones during Carrie Underwood's "Church Bells" (2016); and Sue from Corporate, who paid tribute to Miranda Priestly in a mashup of Lady Gaga's "Fashion!" and "You Are What You Wear" by Duncan Sheik. Poison Waters performed to Natalie Cole's "Party Lights", and Buster Open wore a bedazzled black blazer to "Pants" by Here Come the Mummies.

Later, Ilani Estrella performed to "Barbie Girl", Whitney Houston's "I Have Nothing" (1993), "Private Dancer" (1984) by Tina Turner, and Lipa's "Physical" (2020). Silhouette completed a somersault in a Spears-inspired red jumpsuit, and later performed to "Copycat" (2017) by Billie Eilish. Jocelyn Knobs wore a mirrored jumpsuit during her performance to "Le Disko" (2006) by Shiny Toy Guns. Buster Open revealed bedazzled surgical scars on his chest during a striptease to "Show Yourself" from Frozen, and performed other songs by Mars and Mendes. Henny wore a Thierry Mugler-inspired catsuit to Perry's "E.T." (2011), and Jenna Saisquoix performed to Perry's "Teenage Dream" (2010) wearing a dress inspired by Aurora from Disney's 1959 film Sleeping Beauty.

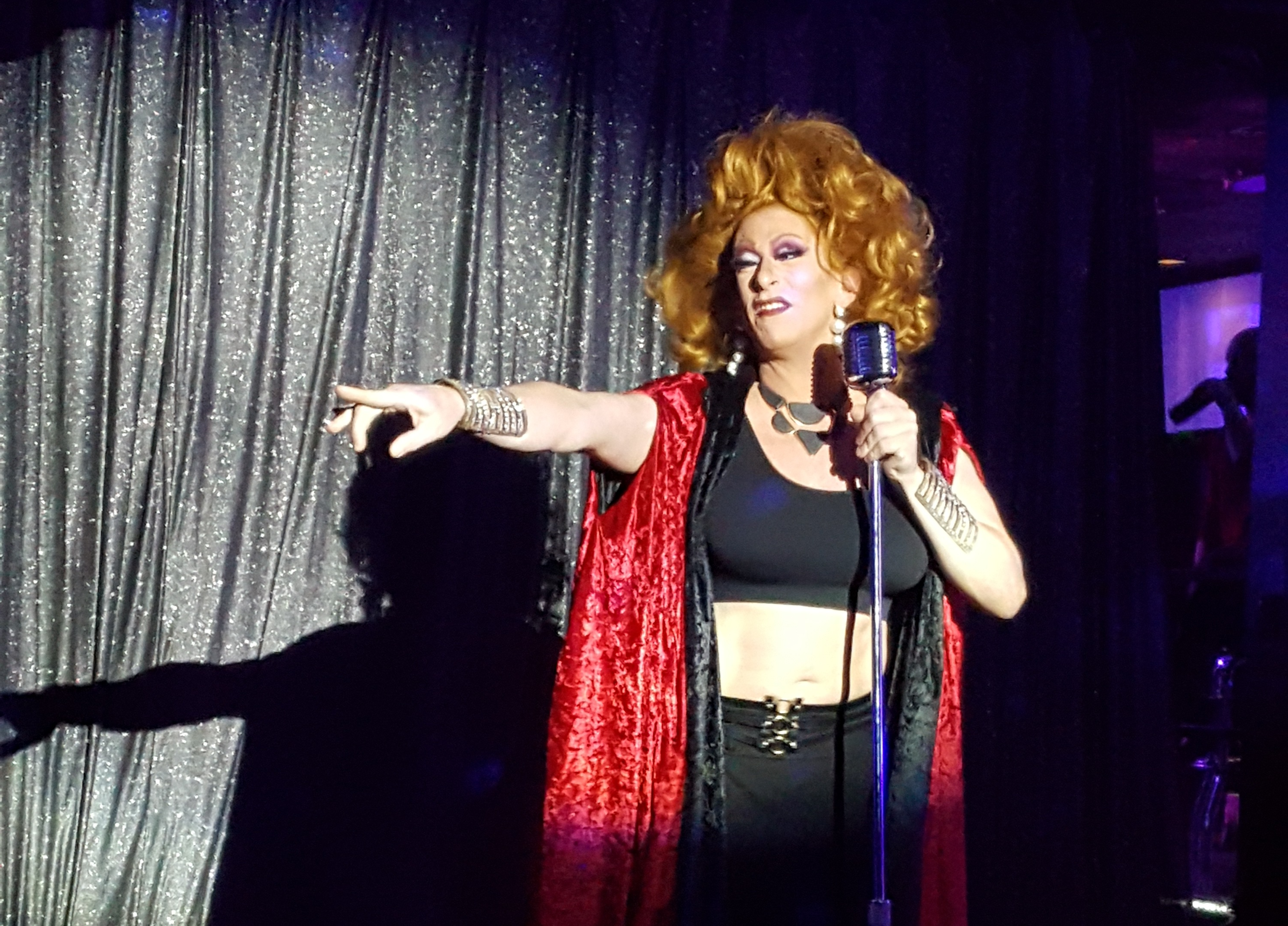
Bolivia Carmichaels (pictured in 2021) and other Darcelle XV Showplace cast members closed out the show.

Among emcees was Laura Gibson, Howie Bierbaum, and poets Mindy Nettifee and Brian S. Ellis, who encouraged voguing and profanity by audience members. Later morning hosts included Kathy Foster, Katelyn Ohashi, and Strayed, who retold some of the jokes from the day before. Emcees in the afternoon included podcasters Sarah Marshall and Chelsey Weber-Smith.

Afternoon performers included Bolivia Carmichaels, LaLa Ri, and Peachy Springs, who lip-synced to a monologue from Designing Women. Fay Ludes performed to a medley which included "All Star" (1991) by Smash Mouth. Leading up to the show's end, the program was dominated by cast members of Darcelle XV Showplace, including: Alexis Campbell Starr, Bebe Jay, BinkYee Bellflower, Cassie Nova, Mr. Mitchell, Poison Waters, and Summer Lynn Seasons. The new record was set during a performance of "We Are Family".

== Results and reactions ==
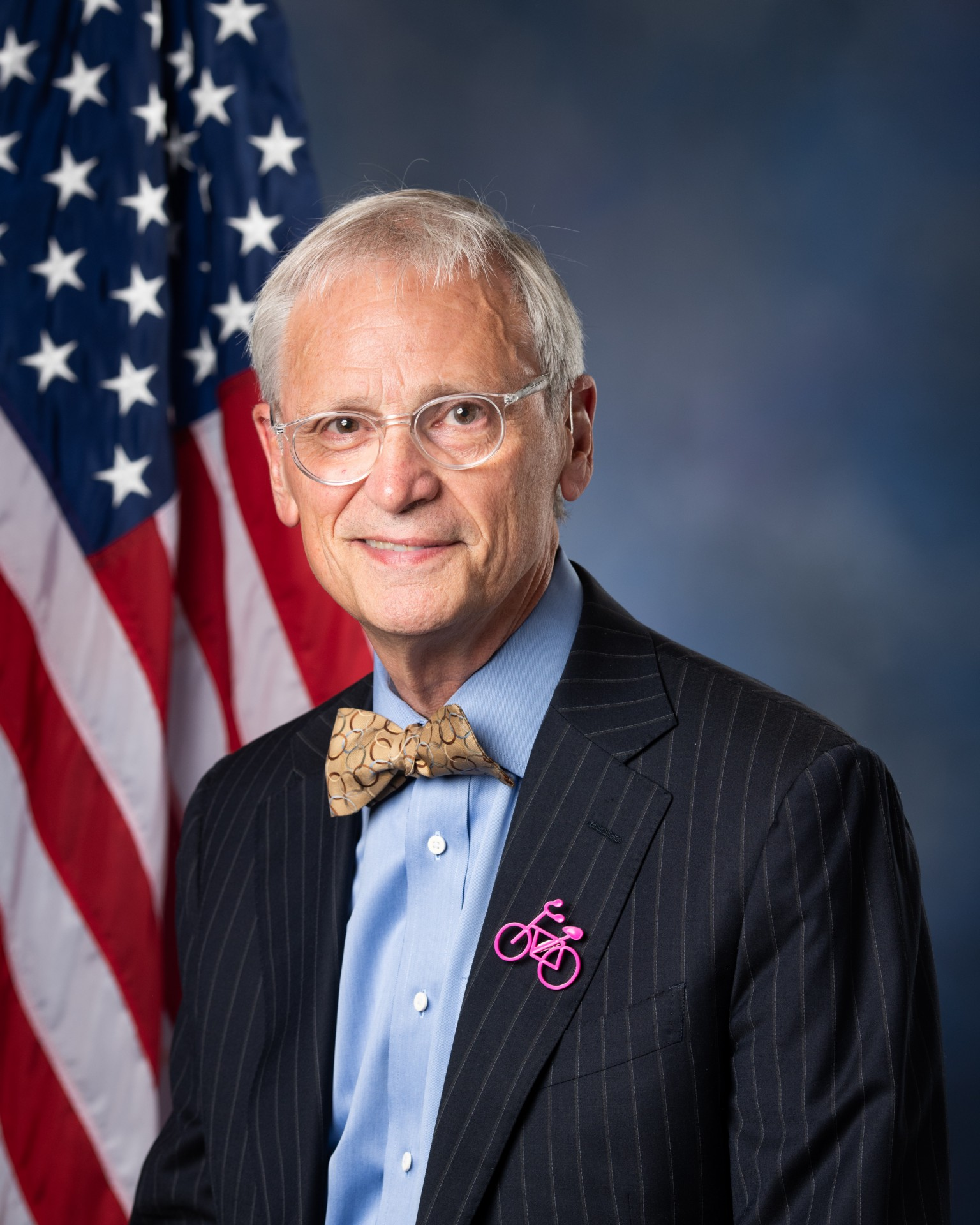
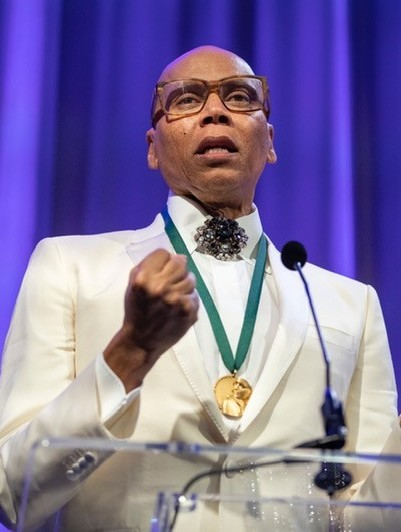
Congressman Earl Blumenauer (left) and RuPaul (right) congratulated organizers and participants for their efforts.

When the show ended, Guinness adjudicator Michael Empric confirmed at 4:25pm: "Today, in Portland, Oregon, USA, you had a time of 48 hours, 11 minutes, and 30 seconds, and you have the new Guinness World Record title." Mcilroy then directed audience members to a congratulatory video message from RuPaul, who said, "This is spreading the love and the joy of drag throughout the world." According to Willamette Week, the message was delivered "to an overjoyed audience whose cheers threatened to drown out every word." A champagne toast followed and "people in bold pattern business suits wept", according to the Portland Mercury's Suzette Smith.

2,500 tickets were sold for the show, which featured 600 songs and 700 set changes. Multnomah County Commissioner Jessica Vega Pederson attended. In total, approximately $290,000 was raised for The Trevor Project, with $50,000 being donated by Wildfang. Congressman Earl Blumenauer praised organizers and said:

Congratulations to Darcelle XV Showplace and every drag queen who participated to break the world record for the longest continuous drag performance. It is only fitting Darcelle's legendary showplace brings home this historic recognition. Despite hateful attempts to restrict or even ban drag performances across the country, in Portland drag is not going anywhere. We are proud to celebrate this incredible performance art and the entire LGBTQ+ community today and every day.

== See also ==
- 2020s anti-LGBTQ movement in the United States
- Culture of Portland, Oregon
- Drag panic
- LGBTQ grooming conspiracy theory
