= Wildfang =

Apparel company

- Industry: Apparel/Clothing/Fashion
- Founder: Emma Mcilroy
- Headquarters: Portland, Oregon
- Key people: Taralyn Thuot, Creative Director
- Products: Clothing for all
- Website: www.wildfang.com

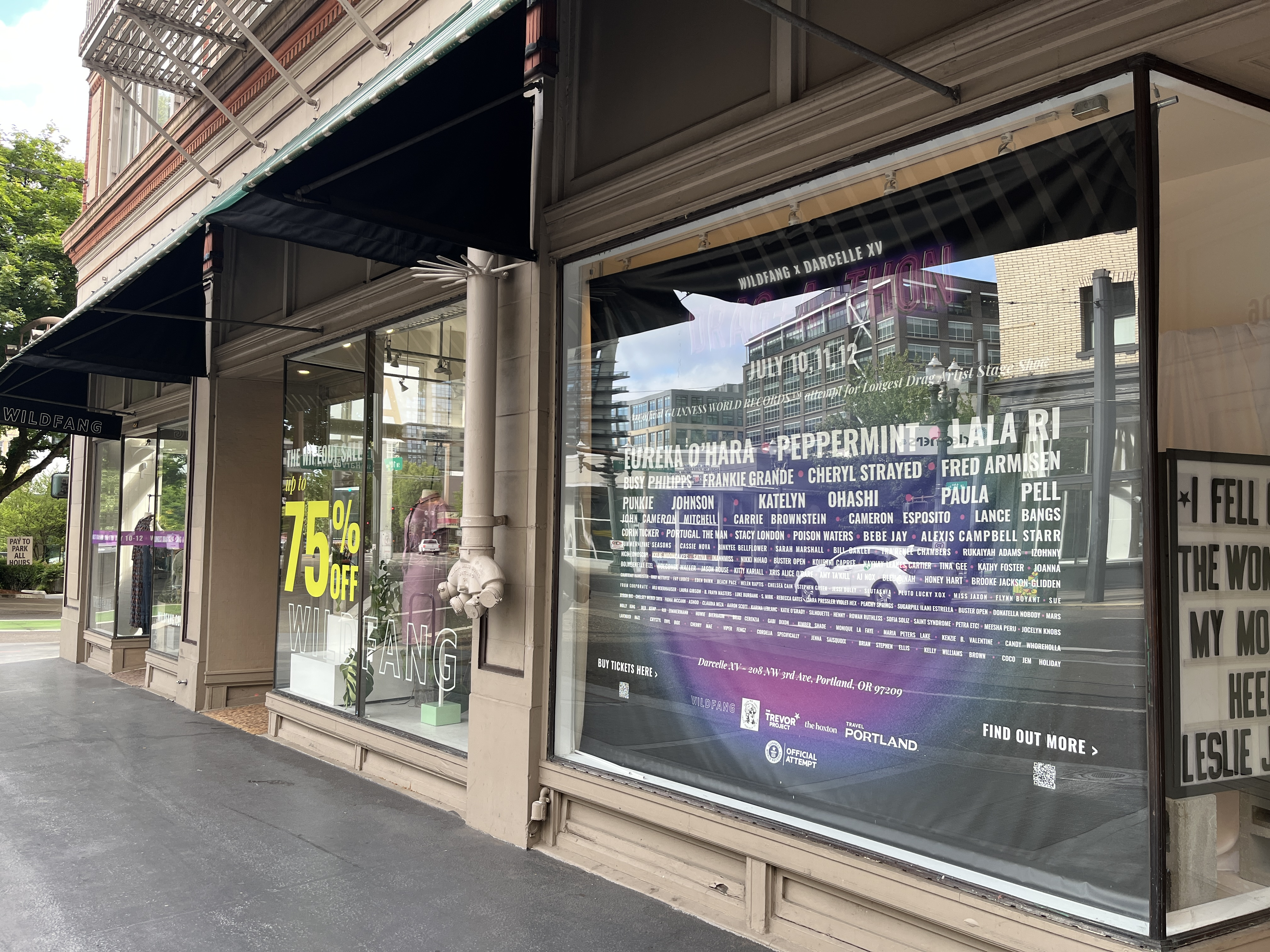
Shop in downtown Portland, Oregon, with a window display for the Drag-a-thon event produced by Wildfang in 2023

Wildfang is a Portland, Oregon-based queer-friendly apparel company known for its untraditional approach to gender norms. The company was co-founded in 2012 by Emma Mcilroy, Taralyn Thuot and Julia Parsley, who previously worked at Nike, Inc. The business operates a shop in downtown Portland.

== History ==
In 2018, Wildfang created a collection of t-shirts and a bomber jacket with the tagline, "I Really Care, Don't U?". This was in response to the "I Really Don't Care, Do U?" jacket worn by Melania Trump on her trip to visit immigrant children at a detention center. All proceeds from the sales of the tag-lined items went to a charitable organization, Refugee and Immigrant Center for Education and Legal Services.

In February 2020, Wildfang filed a lawsuit against Target Corporation alleging that its Wild Fable clothing line infringed on Wildfang's company trademark. In the lawsuit, Wildfang asks that Target stop selling its Wild Fable line, and that profits from the sale of its merchandise be transferred to Wildfang.

In July 2023, Wildfang produced Drag-a-thon, an event that achieved a Guinness World Records certification for the longest running drag show and raised over $290,000 for The Trevor Project.

== Reception ==
Wildfang placed second in the Best Clothing Boutique category of Willamette Week's annual 'Best of Portland' readers' poll in 2025.
