= CC Slaughters =

Pair of gay bars and nightclubs in Portland, Oregon and Puerto Vallarta, Mexico

- Logo

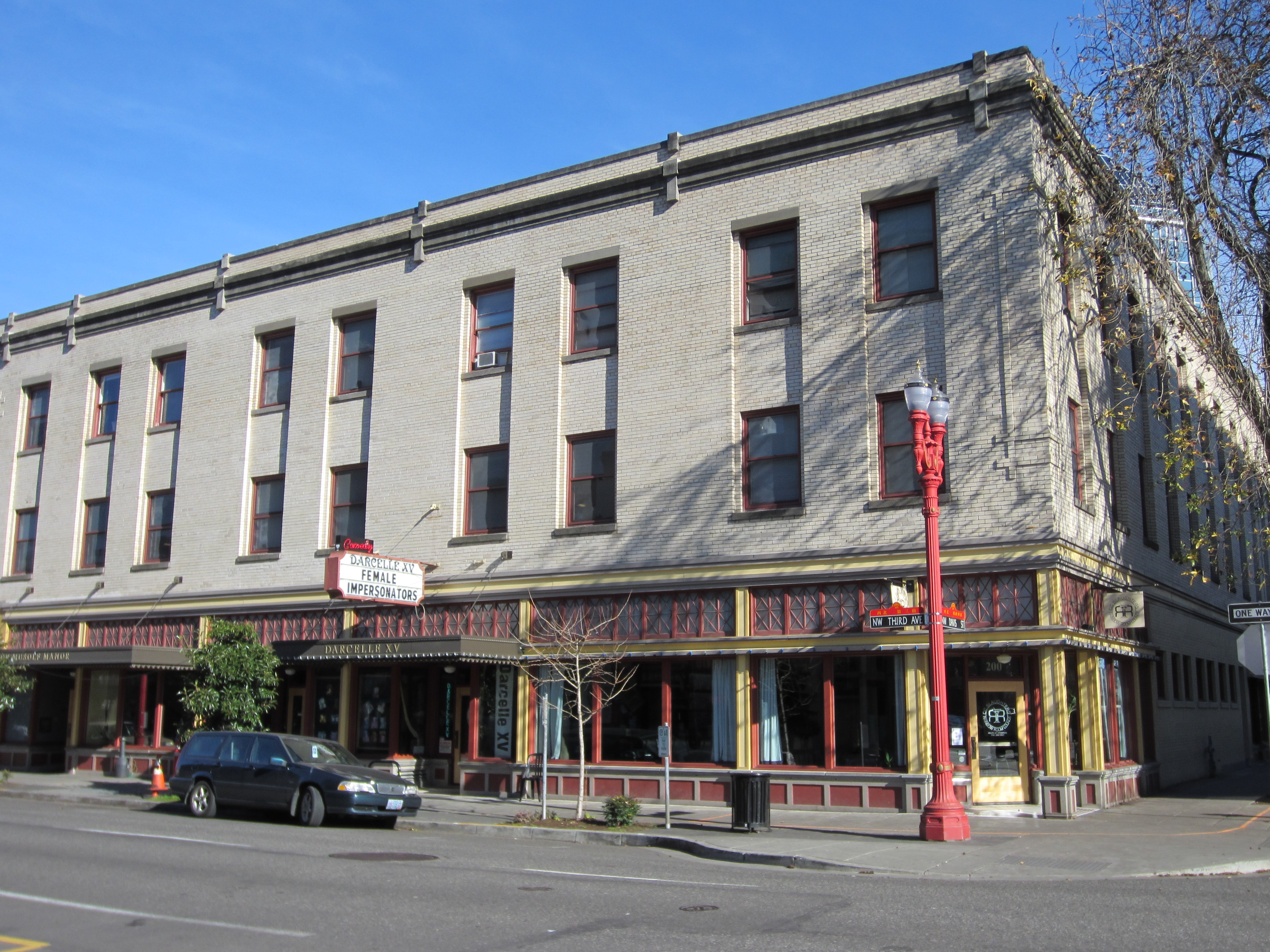
- Entrances to the club and neighboring drag venue Darcelle XV Showplace, in Portland, Oregon, in 2012

- Location within Portland, Oregon
- Address: Portland, Oregon: 219 Northwest Davis Street; Puerto Vallarta: Lázaro Cárdenas 254
- Location: Portland, Oregon, United States; Puerto Vallarta, Mexico
- Coordinates: 45°31′29″N 122°40′23″W
- Type: Gay bar; nightclub

Construction
- Opened: 1981 (Portland, Oregon)

Website
- www.ccslaughterspdx.com ccslaughterspv.com

CC Slaughters is a gay bar and nightclub located in Portland, Oregon, and Puerto Vallarta, Mexico. The Portland bar is located in the Old Town Chinatown neighborhood, and the Puerto Vallarta bar is located in Zona Romántica.

== Portland, Oregon ==
=== Description and history ===
The CC Slaughters in Portland, Oregon, located on Davis Street in the northwest Portland part of the Old Town Chinatown neighborhood, was established in 1981. It plays different music genres every night. The Portland Mercury has described the club as having a "shiny and modern inside with no cover charge, a big dance floor and crazy laser/light show". Adjacent to the dance floor was a lounge called Rainbow Room.

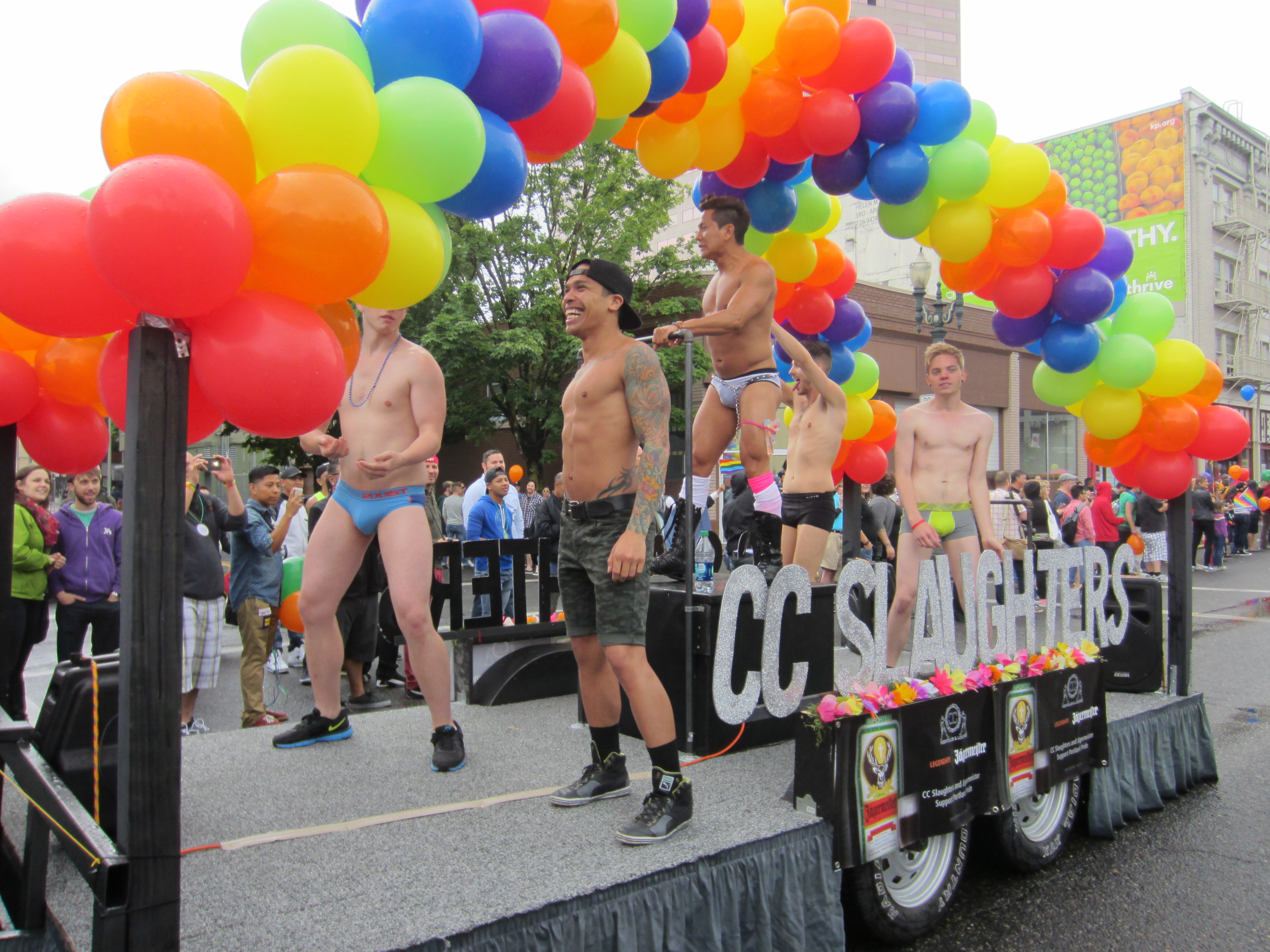
Dancers representing the bar at Portland Pride 2014

In 2014, CC Slaughters was one of the few two bars to be featured in the list of bars attributed to DUI arrests in Portland in four years of data reviewed by Jonathan Maus of Bike Portland. In May 2017, one of its DJs was murdered in a random stabbing near his home.

In his 2019 "overview of Portland's LGBTQ+ nightlife for the newcomer", Andrew Jankowski of the Portland Mercury wrote: "CC Slaughters & Rainbow Lounge is your prototypical gay bar. It's split into two spaces, joined by a video slot parlor. The Rainbow Lounge is next to Darcelle XV Showplace, and is perfect for a cocktail, chatting, or attending a viewing party, while CC's dance floor hosts multiple drag revues and party nights every day of the week."

The Portland club announced plans to close indefinitely in 2020, during the COVID-19 pandemic and was closed on October 11, 2020 "for the foreseeable future". The manager said the strain on the business from the pandemic and increasing homeless camps in the Old Town neighborhood was too much. In March, the business confirmed plans to re-open in April 2021. It announced intentions to close at the end of July 2025, however it continues to operate under new owners. Jonathan Lo and Christopher Lovern are the current owners of the Portland location.

==== Dress code ====
In August 2012, CC Slaughters issued a statement on its dress code regarding bachelorette party attire. The bar commented that bachelorette groups would be admitted, but affiliated attire such as penis hats or other costume jewelry, tiaras, veils or other accessories referencing bachelorettes, brides or weddings, were not allowed. The statement issued by the company's marketing director stated:

[The] majority of [CC Slaughters] patrons are prohibited under Oregon Law from entering into a marriage with the one they love. To put it plainly, they're gay. So, when parties of bachelorettes walk through the doors of a gay nightclub, branded from head-to-toe in prenuptial garb and there to celebrate their upcoming marriage, many of our patrons were taking offense to it. This was creating an issue that CC Slaughters and many within the LGBTQ community felt very strongly about. The 'Bachelorette Attire Policy' was created to address this issue.

In 2013, the policy was criticized by a lesbian couple who were denied entry to the bar when they arrived in their wedding dresses (they were married earlier that day). The couple called their experience "discrimination against lesbians". The bar's owners issued an apology, but the couple demanded "some kind of explanation or a change in policy". A short while later, two male patrons in matching grooms shirts and bow ties were refused entry on the ground they violated the club's policy against bachelorette party attire.

==== Events and activities ====
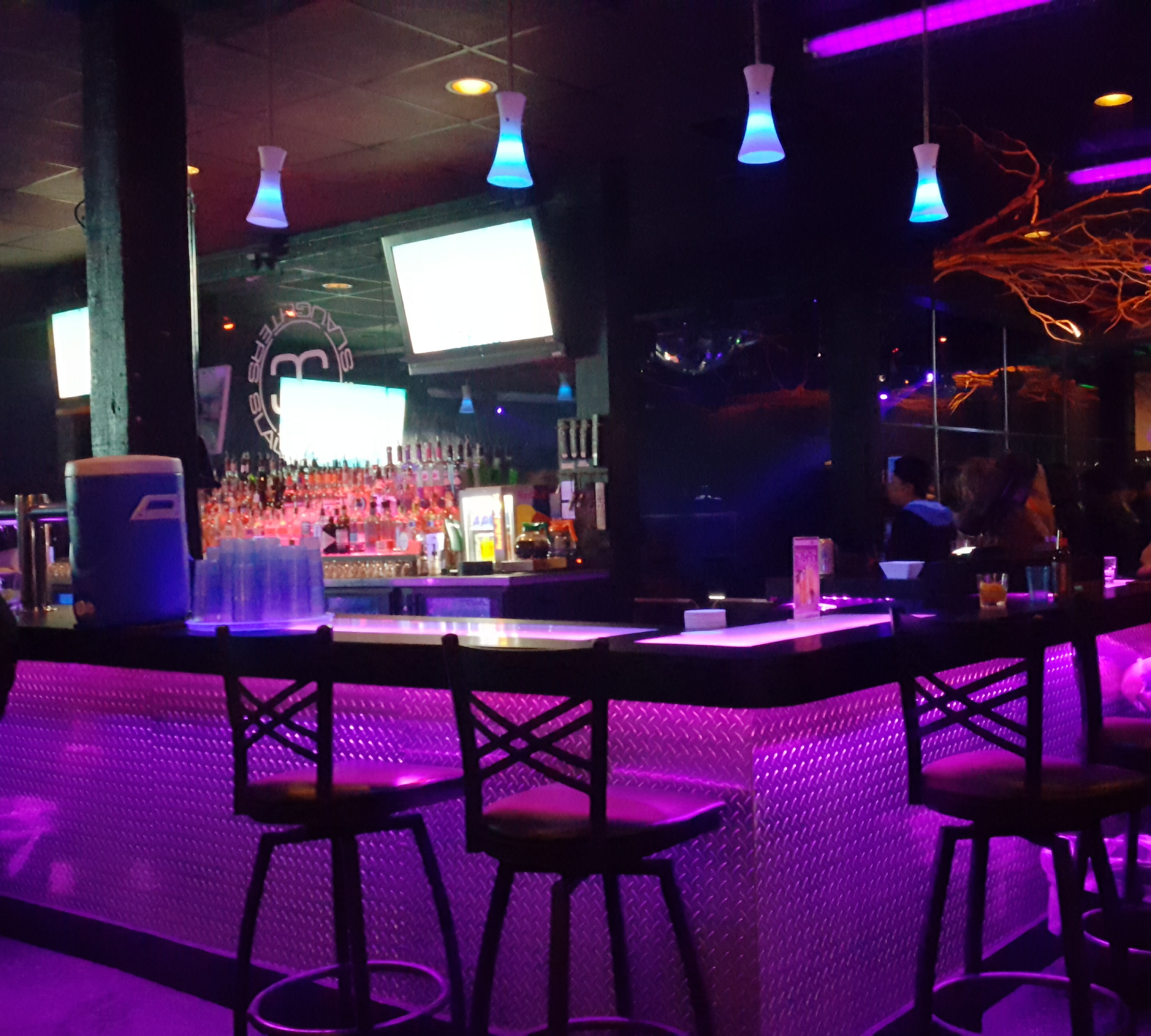
Interior of the Portland bar, 2019

The bar has hosted "Ladies' Night" on Tuesdays and drag shows on Sundays, plus many events throughout the year. It hosted an annual block party during the summer and a "Platinum Ball" on New Year's Eve. In 2011, CC Slaughters served as a gathering point for a demonstration called "We Are Not Afraid", which was organized by the Oregon State Gay Pride Organization and attracted an estimated 400 people. The business has participated in Portland's pride parade, organized by Pride Northwest.

=== Reception ===
In 2013, Out included the Portland location in its list of the "200 of the Greatest Gay Bars in the World".

CC's was a runner-up in the Best LGBT Bar category of Willamette Week's annual 'Best of Portland' readers' poll in 2017. The business was a runner-up in the same poll's Best LGBTQ Bar category and ranked third in the Best Drag Show category in 2018. It was also a runner-up in the Best Drag Show and Best LGBTQ Bar categories in 2020, and ranked second in the same poll's Best LGBTQ Bar category in 2022 and 2025. In 2026, CC's ranked second in the Best LGBTQIA+ Bar category and Brandon James placed second in the Best Bartender category.

== Puerto Vallarta ==
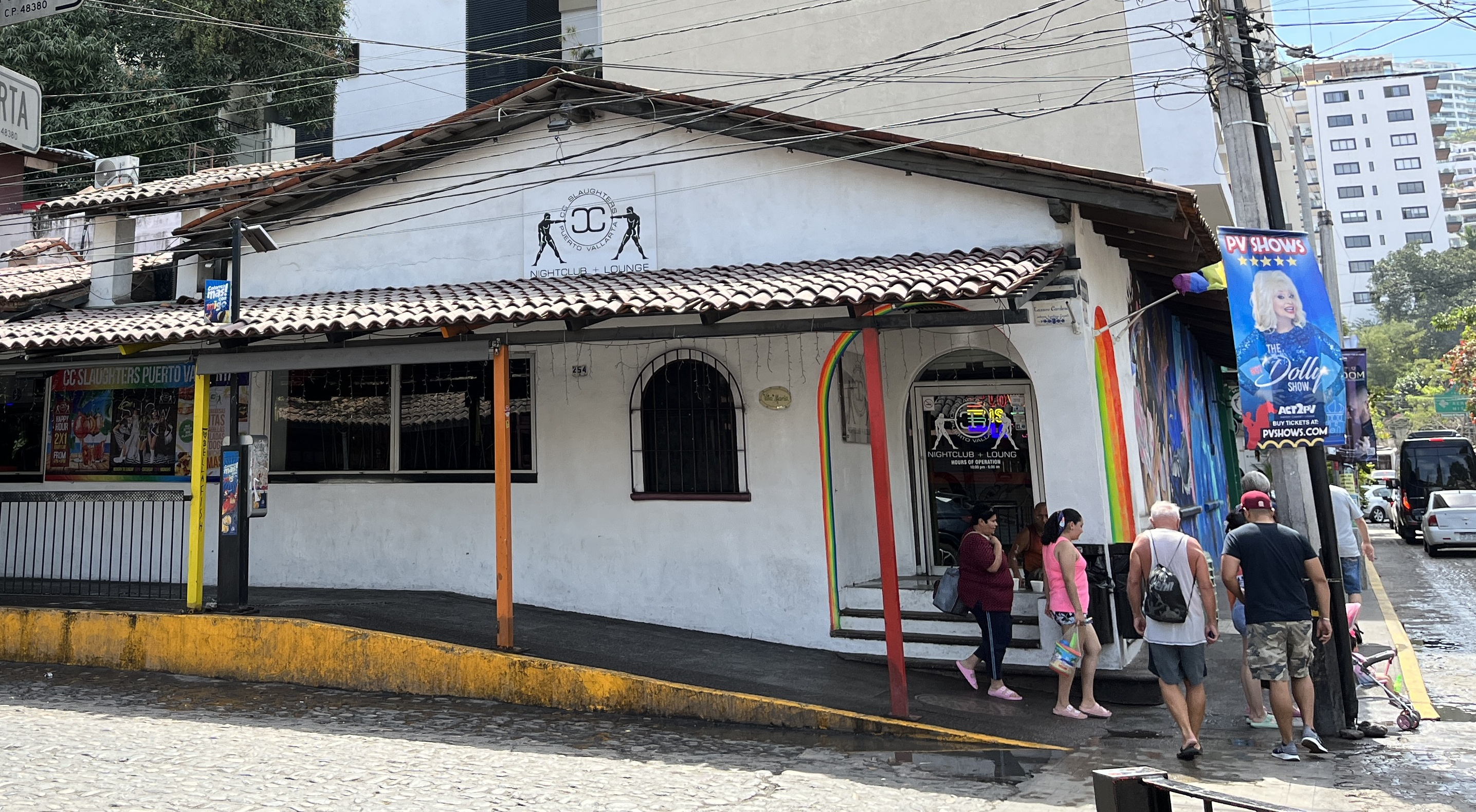
The Puerto Vallarta bar, 2023

PinkNews has said the CC Slaughters in Puerto Vallarta "tends to be quite mixed". In 2020, the site's Amy Ashenden wrote, "If you’re going out mid-week this is likely to be the busiest (although its nightclub at the back of the bar will be painfully empty). Playing pop and Latino dance, the bar is quite friendly and, after you’ve had enough tequila, it has a nightclub at the back."

== See also ==
- COVID-19 pandemic in Portland, Oregon
- Culture of Portland, Oregon
- Impact of the COVID-19 pandemic on the LGBTQ community
- LGBTQ culture in Puerto Vallarta
- List of LGBTQ bars
