= Darcelle XV Showplace =

Drag venue and historic building in Portland, Oregon, U.S.

- Logo

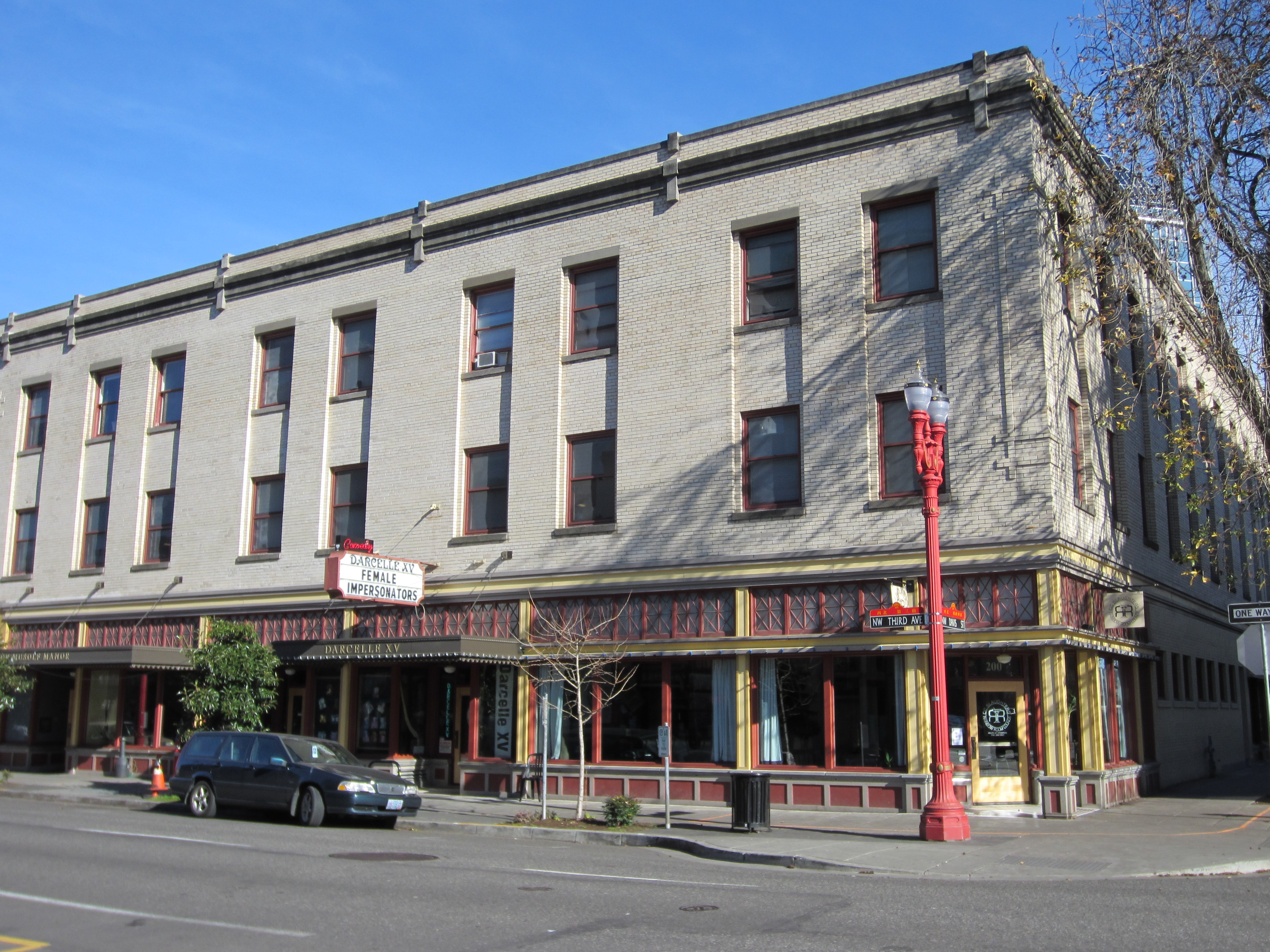
- The entrance to Darcelle XV Showplace and neighboring CC Slaughters in 2012
- Interactive map of Darcelle XV Showplace
- Location: Portland, Oregon, U.S.
- Coordinates: 45.5247508°N 122.673112°W
- Owner: Darcelle XV
- Type: Entertainment venue
- Event: Drag show

Construction
- Opened: 1967

Website
- www.darcellexv.com

Darcelle XV Showplace is a drag venue in Portland, Oregon, opened and formerly operated by drag performer Darcelle XV.

== History ==
The club opened in 1967. In June 2020, the venue was nominated for national historic registry status by the State Advisory Committee on Historic Preservation, marking the first time an LGBTQ-related establishment was considered in Oregon. The site was listed on the National Register of Historic Places in November 2020. The venue launched drag brunch in September. Darcelle XV, the founder and namesake of the showplace, died of natural causes at the age of 92 in March 2023.

From July 10 through July 12, 2023, Darcelle XV Showplace hosted a 48-hour Drag-a-thon attempting to break the Guinness World Records for longest drag artist stage show. In addition to attempting to break the world record, the event also raised money for the nonprofit The Trevor Project that provides crisis intervention services for LGBTQ youth.

Cast members have included Alexis Campbell Starr, Bolivia Carmichaels, and Poison Waters.

== Reception ==
Darcelle's won in the "Best Drag Show" category of Willamette Week's "Best of Portland Readers' Poll 2020".

== See also ==
- LGBTQ culture in Portland, Oregon
- National Register of Historic Places listings in Northwest Portland, Oregon
