= Darcelle XV =

American drag queen (1930–2023)

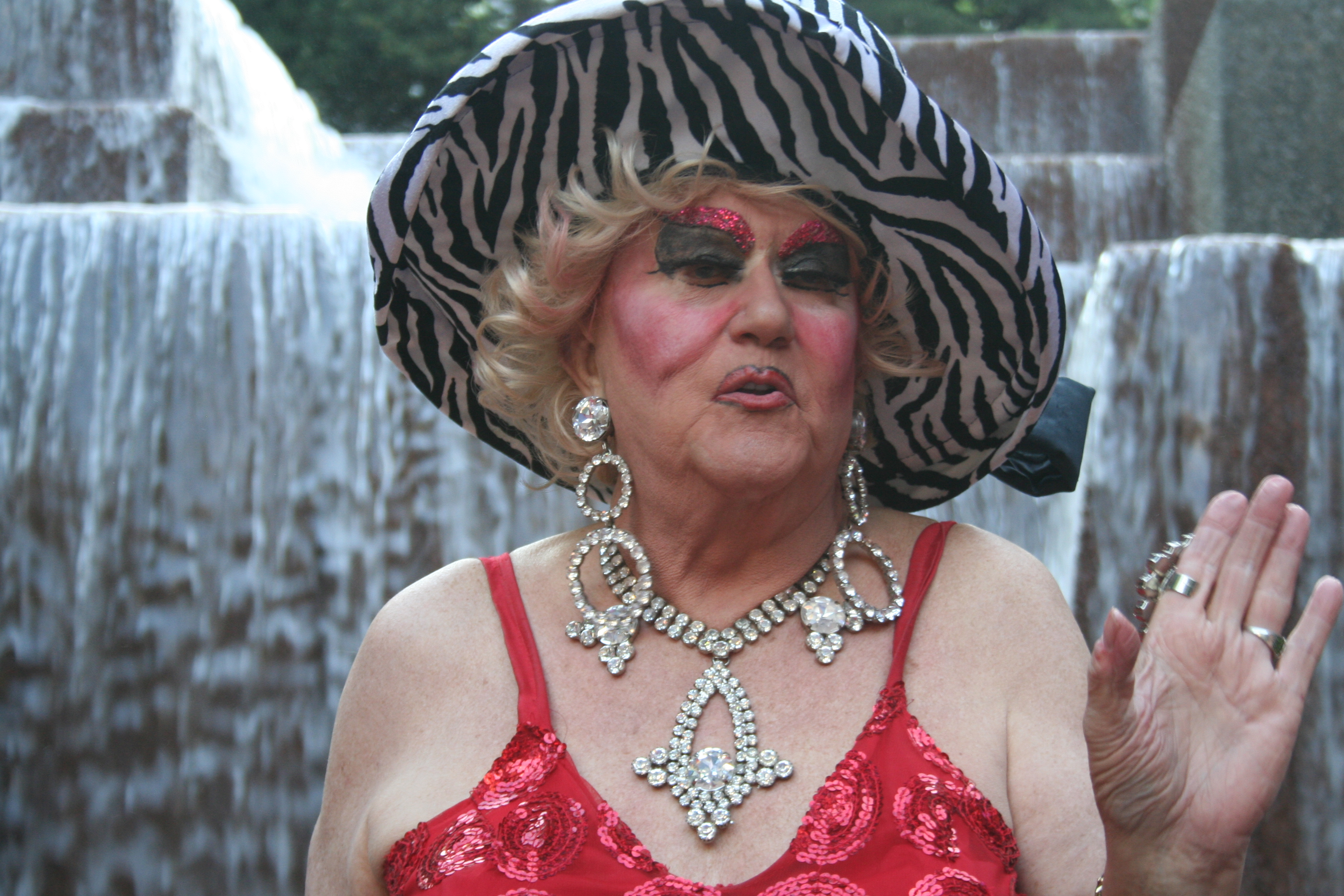
- Darcelle at Portland's Keller Fountain Park for the city's 2012 "Pedalpalooza" bike ride
- Born: Walter Willard Cole; November 16, 1930; Portland, Oregon, U.S.
- Died: March 23, 2023 (aged 92); Portland, Oregon, U.S.
- Occupations: Drag queen; entertainer; night club owner; author
- Years active: 1967–2023
- Known for: Oldest performing drag queen (2016–2023); Operating drag cabaret venue Darcelle XV Showplace
- Notable work: Just Call Me Darcelle
- Partner: Roxy Neuhardt (1969–2017)
- Children: 2
- Awards: Spirit of Portland Award

Darcelle XV (November 16, 1930 – March 23, 2023) was the stage name of Walter Willard Cole, an American drag queen, entertainer, and cabaret owner and operator in Portland, Oregon. Guinness World Records had certified him as the oldest drag queen performer in 2016, with a career as an entertainer spanning 56 years at the time of his death.

== Biography ==
Walter Willard Cole was born on November 16, 1930, and raised in the Linnton neighborhood of Portland, Oregon. He was described as a shy, "four-eyed sissy boy". In 1952, he was drafted into the United States Army, where he was stationed in Italy with the Signal Corps, and served for three years. Afterward, he lived a "conventional" life in southeast Portland with his wife and two children. He worked at a Fred Meyer store and described himself as having "a crew cut and horn-rimmed glasses". Cole used military funds to help start business ventures.

Cole first purchased a coffeehouse called Caffé Espresso, which later relocated and expanded to include a basement jazz club called Studio A. In 1967, he purchased a tavern in northwest Portland which became Darcelle XV Showplace.

Cole first wore a woman's dress at age 37. By 1969, he had developed the alter ego Darcelle and came out as gay. He left his wife (though they remained legally married) and began a relationship with Roxy Neuhardt, who worked alongside Darcelle at the Showplace as a choreographer, show director, performer, bookkeeper, office manager, and payroll accountant. The two remained together until Neuhardt's death in 2017.

Cole died of natural causes at a hospital in Portland on March 23, 2023, at the age of 92. In one of his final interviews, Darcelle stated on the LGBTQ&A podcast that everything was set up to ensure that his daughter, son, and longtime collaborator, Poison Waters, would be able to keep Darcelle XV Showplace running after his death.

=== Darcelle ===
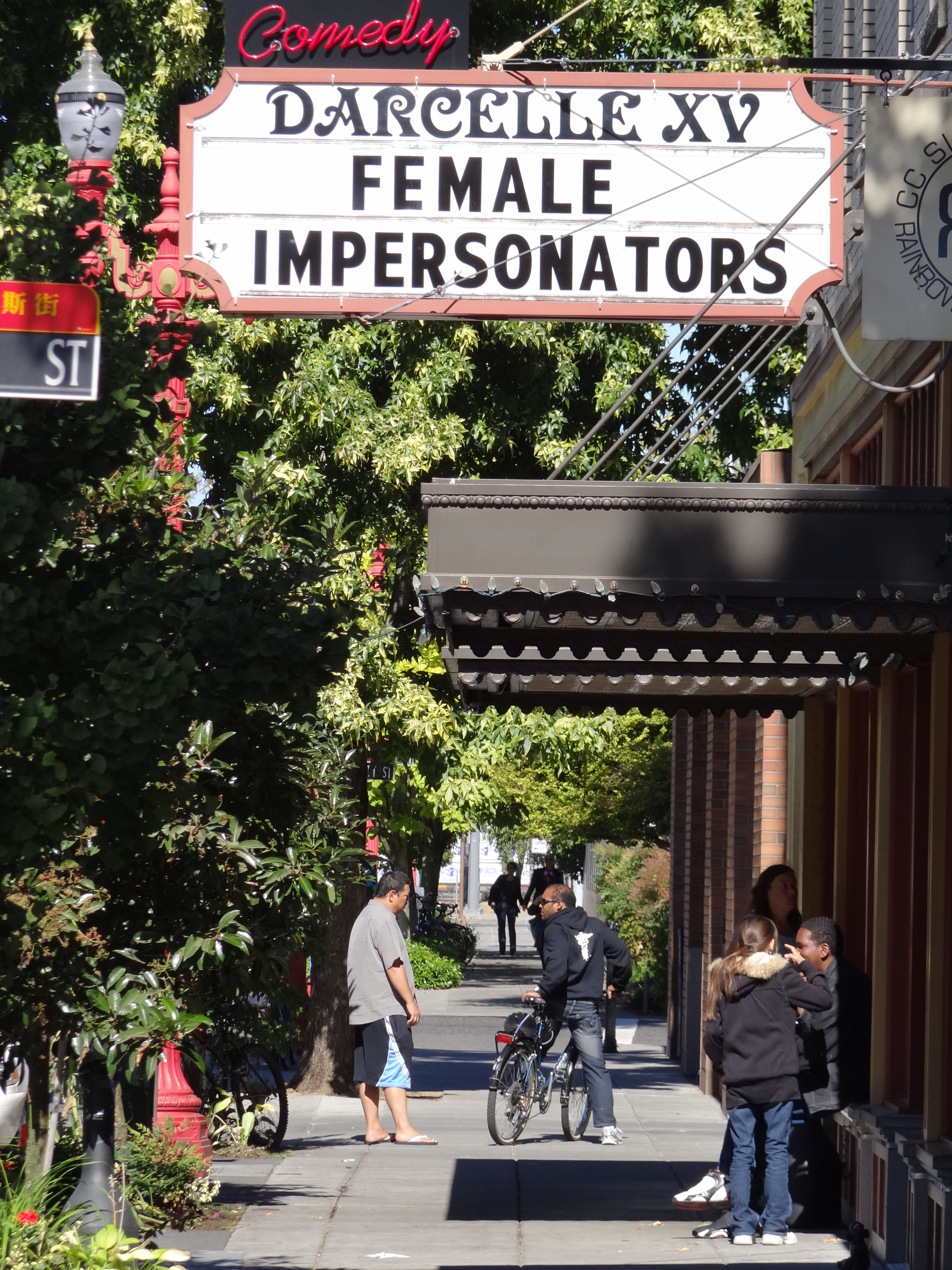
Entrance to Darcelle XV Showplace

Cole, who had an interest in acting and had worked at Portland Civic Theater, developed his alter ego Darcelle and came out as gay. The name "Darcelle" honors French actress and singer Denise Darcel.

Darcelle wore false eyelashes, jewelry, and shiny clothing. Cole described Darcelle's persona as "sequins on the eyelids, lots of feathers, big hair, big jewels, and lots of wisecracks". Avoiding an Oregon law that prohibited the use of more than one instrument during performances, entertainers at Darcelle XV Showplace lip-synched. The business was fined after Neuhardt performed a "ballet-like adagio" with another man.

Darcelle attended social functions throughout the city. In 2011, he served as grand marshal of the Portland Rose Festival's Starlight Parade and received the city's Spirit of Portland Award. Cole and Sharon Knorr published his memoir, Just Call Me Darcelle, in 2011. The book recalls Cole's life, including his childhood, military service, and being Darcelle.

== Reception ==
Darcelle XV Showplace has hosted the longest-running drag show on the West Coast. In Kelly Clarke's review of Cole's memoir, she described him as "an energetic businessman whose desire for a life less ordinary catapulted him from a job at Fred Meyer to become the proprietor of a counterculture coffee shop, an after-hours jazz club, a rough-'n'-ready 'dyke bar' and, finally, a nationally known drag revue, without ever leaving Portland." Darcelle XV was recognized by Guinness World Records as the world's oldest drag queen in 2016, then aged 85 years and 273 days.

== Darcelle XV Plaza ==
In 2023, city officials announced plans to rename O'Bryant Square in memory of Darcelle XV. The new plaza would replace O'Bryant Square. Drawings released in early 2024, show the park would have a stage, public art space, and a wall of fame for notable LGBTQ Portlanders.

On June 18, 2026, a ribbon-cutting ceremony was held at the new public space, Darcelle XV Plaza, to honor the iconic drag performer. The open-plan concrete square already has a lineup of events planned including happy hour drag shows. The official grand opening will take place at 5:00p.m. on June 25 with performances, food, drinks, and a 'glam station' where guests can get Darcelle-style signature makeup.

== See also ==
- La Femme Magnifique International Pageant
- List of drag queens
- Michelle DuBarry, among the world's oldest performing drag queens
