= Oregon Women of Achievement =

Honor presented by the Oregon Commission for Women

The Oregon Commission for Women established the Oregon Women of Achievement in 1985 to recognize the accomplishments of Oregon women and to demonstrate appreciation for their endeavors. Qualifying candidates to be nominated for the Oregon Women of Achievement are exemplary role models who promote the status of women in society, are committed to diversity and equity and have earned recognition for success and leadership in their fields. As of 2013, 81 women have been honored by the Oregon Commission for Women.

== Inductees ==
Oregon Women of Achievement
Name	Image	Birth–Death	Year	Area of achievement	Ref(s)
Sarah Koski			2024	Emerging Leader Award	
Solome Mekbib			2024	Professional Achievement Award	
Liani Reeves			2024	Lifetime Achievement Award	
Mari Watanabe		(b. 1958/59)	2023	Lifetime Achievement Award - Mari is a former Co-Chair of the Oregon Commission on Asian and Pacific Islander Affairs (OCAPIA), OCFW's sister commission. Now retired, Mari is a former Executive Director of Partners in Diversity, founding member of the City of Beaverton Diversity Advisory Board and serves on other nonprofit boards that support veterans, Japanese Americans, women, and the arts. She holds a diversity and inclusion certificate from Cornell University and an undergraduate degree from Washington State University in fashion merchandising.	
LaNicia Duke			2023	Professional Achievement Award - LaNicia Duke is the founder and CEO of Humble Beginnings, a nonprofit dedicated to serving rural communities in Oregon. Her latest program, Black Rural Network, provides outreach, networking, and civic engagement opportunities for Black residents of rural communities.	
Fatuma Mohamed			2023	Emerging Leader Award - Throughout her career, Fatuma Mohamed has shown dedication to ending food insecurity, supporting and advocating for underrepresented communities, bridging the racial wealth gap, and advocating for accessible housing.	
Ginny Burdick			2022	Oregon Senate 1997–2021, Majority Leader 2015-2020	
Karol Collymore			2022	LGBTQIA leadership and volunteerism	
Laila Hajoo			2020	Co-founder and president of Islamic Social Services of Oregon State (ISOS); co-chair of Muslim Advisory Council with Portland Police; chair of IRCO's Greater Middle East Center Advisory Council.	
Debra Porta			2020	First executive director for Pride Northwest	
Laura Salerno Owens			2020	First woman attorney to serve as president of Markowitz Herbold litigation firm. Created Leaders and Executives Across Professions (LEAP) to provide support for women professionals.	
Amira Streeter			2020	Natural Resources Policy Advisor	
Belinda Carroll		(b. 1976)	2019	Writer, stand-up comedian, actor, activist	
Sharon Gary-Smith			2019	Social activist	
Adrienne Nelson		(b. 1967)	2019	Associate Justice of the Oregon Supreme Court	
Andrea Paluso			2019	Co-founder and executive director of Family Forward Oregon and Family Forward Action	
Susan Stoltenberg			2018	Executive Director of the YWCA of Greater Portland	
Erlinda Gonzales-Berry		(b. 1942)	2017	Author, chair Department of Ethnic Studies at Oregon State University	
Guadalupe Guajardo			2017	Senior consultant of Nonprofit Association of Oregon for 30 years	
Liliana Luna			2017	DACA immigrant student. Coordinator of Portland Community College's Multicultural Center on the Rock Creek campus	
Anita Yap			2017	Founding partner of the MultiCultural Collaborative	
Nancy Campbell Mead			2016	Retired judge, founded the Central Coast Chapter of the National Organization for Women	
Chanpone Sinlapasai-Okamura			2016	Chairman Commission on Asian and Pacific Islander Affairs. Advocate for the rights of immigrants and refugees.	
Jan Campbell			2015	Portland advocate for persons with disabilities	
Donna Maxley			2015	Portland creator of the nonprofit RACE TALKS, to promote racial understanding	
Kay D. Toran			2015	President and chief executive officer of Volunteers of America Oregon	
Gwendolyn Trice			2015	Founder of Maxville Heritage Interpretative Center in Wallow County; advocate and researcher for the roles of minorities in the logging industry	
Peg Malloy			2014	Founder Portland's Housing Center	
Lisa Schroeder			2014	Owner of Mother's Bistro & Bar in Portland	
Cheryl Strayed		(b. 1968)	2014	Author	
Jill Tanner			2014	Presiding Magistrate of the Oregon Tax Court	
Joanne Verger		(1930–2023)	2014	Politician, first female mayor of Coos Bay, Oregon	
Gun Denhart			2013	Businesswoman, founder of Hanna Andersson	
Mary Katherine Eaton		(1924–2018)	2013	Women's rights and clean government activist	
Cecilia Giron			2013	Mentor, director of the after-school Adelante Chicas for young women of Hispanic heritage	
Sheila L. North			2013	Former Executive Director of De Paul Treatment Centers	
Robin Morris Collin			2012	Law professor at Willamette University	
Jane O'Keefe			2012	Vice-chair of the Oregon Environmental Quality Commission	
Gina Warren			2012	Vice President of Global Diversity and Inclusion for Nike, Inc.	
Serena Stoudamire Wesley			2012	Coalition of Communities of Color	
Jill Ginsberg			2011	Medical director of the North by Northeast Community Health Center	
Jane Lubchenco		(b. 1947)	2011	Environmental scientist and marine ecologist	
Minalee Saks			2011	Founder and executive director of the Birth To Three parenting program	
Rita Sullivan			2011	Executive Director of OnTrack, a chemical dependency treatment organization	
Gretchen Kafoury		(1942–2015)	2010	Representative in the Oregon Legislative Assembly, Multnomah County Commission and the Portland City Council	
Melody Rose			2010	Vice provost for academic programs and instruction at Portland State University; founder and director of The Center for Women, Politics & Policy	
Latricia Tillman			2010	Administrator for the Oregon Office of Multicultural Health and Services	
Gert Boyle		(1924–2019)	2009	Chair of Columbia Sportswear	
Arlene Schnitzer		(1929–2020)	2009	Patron of the arts and philanthropist alongside her husband Harold Schnitzer; namesake of the Arlene Schnitzer Concert Hall	
Nancy Golden		(b. 1951)	2008	Former superintendent of Springfield Public Schools, Education Advisor to Governor Kitzhaber, and Chief Education Officer for the State of Oregon.	
Darlene Hooley		(b. 1939)	2008	Former member of the U.S. House of Representatives who represented Oregon's 5th congressional district	
Sydney Sherwood			2008	Executive Director of Tigard Chamber of Commerce	
Keren Brown Wilson			2008	Gerontology professor at Portland State University's Institute on Aging	
Mary Overstreet			2007	Pastor and founder of the Power House Temple Church	
Carmen Ramirez			2007	Farm worker and board member with PCUN	
Gretchen Schuette		(b. 1946)	2007	Former president of Chemeketa Community College	
Donalda Dodson			2006	Executive Director of the Oregon Child Development Coalition	
Joan Palmateer			2006	Assistant director for facility operations for the Oregon Youth Authority	
Cherri Pancake			2006	Professor and Intel Faculty Fellow at the School of Electrical Engineering and Computer Science at Oregon State University	
Johanna Brenner		(b. 1943)	2005	Professor and coordinator of the women's studies program at Portland State University	
Harriet Isom		(b. 1936)	2005	Former U.S Ambassador to Benin and Cameroon	
Serena Ota St. Clair			2005	Professor and Pathways and Articulation Coordinator at Rogue Community College in Southern Oregon	
Joan Brown-Kline			2004	Executive director of the Washington and Multnomah counties program of Oregon CASA; former president and owner of Brown-Kline & Company	
Victoria Burton			2004	Helped build the Crisis Response Teams for the Portland Police Bureau	
Martha Young		(−2006)	2004	Executive Director for the Cow Creek Umpqua Indian Foundation	
Phyllis Lee		(b. 1936)	2003	Director of Multicultural Affairs at Oregon State University	
Diane Rosenbaum		(b. 1949)	2003	Senate President Pro Tempore of the Oregon State Senate	
Jerralynn Ness			2003	Anti-poverty activist	
Connie Ashbrook			2002	Founding member and the executive director of the non-profit Oregon Tradeswomen, Inc.	
Susan Castillo		(b. 1951)	2002	Oregon Superintendent of Public Instruction and member of the Oregon State Senate. Castillo was the first Latina in the Oregon Legislative Assembly.	
Katherine Jensen			2002	Writer and certified Nurse Midwife	
Clariner Boston			2001	Executive Director of Better People	
Margaret Jean Hallock			2001	Economist and founding director of the Wayne Morse Center for Law and Politics at the University of Oregon	
Kathleen Margerum			2001	Member of the Florence Area Coordinating Council	
Elmo Bloom			2000	Manager of the Hermiston Neighborhood Center and developer of a successful senior meal program	
Roslyn Hill			2000	Developer nicknamed the "Queen of Alberta" for her efforts to revitalize Alberta Street in Northeast Portland	
Sue Shaffer		(1922–2017)	2000	Tribal leader of the Cow Creek Band of Umpqua Tribe of Indians	
Avel Gordly		(1947–2026)	1999	First African-American woman to be elected to the Oregon State Senate	
Kathryn Jones Harrison		(1924–2023)	1999	Tribal leader from the Confederated Tribes of the Grand Ronde Community of Oregon	
Katherine Huff O'Neil		(b. 1938)	1999	Attorney and member of the ABA Board of Governors	
Amy Aldrich Bedford		(1912–2006)	1998	Co-owner of the East Oregonian	
Bev Clarno		(b. 1936)	1998	Speaker of the Oregon House of Representatives	
Joan Priscilla Kilbourn		(1936–2011)	1998	Microbiologist, educator	
Margaret Carter		(b. 1935)	1997	Served in the Oregon State Senate and the Oregon House of Representatives	
Patricia Davis Hinrichs			1997	Attorney	
Nellie Fox-Edwards		(1923–2017)	1997	Former political director of the Oregon AFL-CIO	
Dianne Middle			1996	Attorney and director of the Department of Public Safety Standards and Training	
Cheryl Perrin			1996	Executive director of Campaign for America and trustee at Lewis and Clark College	
Judith Ramaley		(b. 1941)	1996	Former president of Portland State University	
Myrlie Evers-Williams		(b. 1933)	1995	Civil rights activist and journalist who worked tirelessly to seek justice for the murder of her well-known civil rights activist husband Medgar Evers in 1963	
Kate Brown		(b. 1960)	1995	Governor of Oregon (first openly bisexual governor) Oregon Secretary of State and former member of the Oregon Senate	
Mary Alice Ford		(1935–2008)	1994	Pro-choice Republican who served in the Oregon House of Representatives for 15 consecutive years representing Washington County	
Annabelle Jaramillo		(b. 1940/41)	1994	Former Executive Director of the Oregon Commission on Hispanic Affairs; Benton County Commissioner	
Ellen Lowe			1994	Board member and commissioner; Public Policy Director for Ecumenical Ministries of Oregon; advocate for low-income Oregonians	
Janet Stevenson		(1913–2009)	1994	Writer and professor. Stevenson served as Mayor of Hammond, Oregon.	
Ann Aiken		(b. 1951)	1993	Attorney and jurist	
Tricia Smith			1993	Government Relations Specialist for Oregon School Employees Association	
Judith Armatta			1993	Lawyer, journalist and human rights activist. Legal counsel to the Oregon Coalition Against Domestic and Sexual Violence. During 2002–2005 she represented the Coalition for International Justice monitoring the Trial of Slobodan Milošević.	
Susan Helms		(b. 1958)	1992	Lieutenant General in the United States Air Force and a former NASA astronaut at the International Space Station	
Joan Biggs			1992		
Ursula K. Le Guin		(1929–2018)	1991	Author of novels, children's books, and short stories, mainly in the genres of fantasy and science fiction	
Gail Shibley		(b. 1958)	1991	First openly gay member of the Oregon House of Representatives; served on the Portland Planning Commission	
Clarice Parr-Sandoz		(1909–1999)	1990	Member of the Walla Walla tribe	
Y. Sherry Sheng			1990	President Clackamas County Master Gardeners; former director Seattle Aquarium and the Oregon Zoo (1988–97)	
Mary Wendy Roberts		(b. 1944)	1989	Daughter of Frank L. Roberts and member of the Oregon House of Representatives and the Oregon State Senate; served as Commissioner of Labor and Industries from 1979 to 1995	
Nancy Wilgenbusch		(1947–2017)	1989	President of Marylhurst University from 1984 to 2008	
Marsha Congdon			1988	Vice President of Policy and Strategy at US West and director of Mentor Graphics	
Betty Roberts		(1923–2011)	1988	83rd Associate Justice of the Oregon Supreme Court	
Nancy Ryles		(1937–1990)	1987	Served in the Oregon House of Representatives, the Oregon Senate and as one of three members of the Oregon Public Utility Commission	
Susan Hammer		(1948–2020)	1987	Attorney and mediator	
Barbara Roberts		(b. 1936)	1986	34th Governor of Oregon from 1991 to 1995	
Norma Paulus		(1933–2019)	1986	Oregon Secretary of State and Oregon Superintendent of Public Instruction	
Vera Katz		(1933–2017)	1985	First woman to serve as Speaker of the Oregon House of Representatives and the 49th mayor of Portland	

== See also ==
- List of awards honoring women
