= Flight Patterns =

Photographic sculpture installation in Eugene, Oregon, U.S.

- Artist: David Joyce (1946-2003)
- Year: 1989
- Type: Photographic sculpture installation
- Medium: Cut-out photographs on masonite
- Subject: Flying people
- Dimensions: 180 cm × 7,200 cm (6 feet × 235 feet)
- Location: Eugene, Oregon, United States
- Owner: Eugene Airport

Flight Patterns, also known informally as Flying People, is a seven-panel photographic sculpture installation of 176 black and white cutouts by David Joyce, designed to be installed in 1989 in Concourse A at the Eugene Airport in the U.S. state of Oregon. During airport construction in 2015–2016, it was moved to Lane Community College. The airport renovations were completed by early January 2017, and all but about 30 of the original Flight Patterns images were reinstalled at the airport in early December 2017.

== Description ==
Flight Patterns consists of approximately 176 black and white photographic cutouts of people, whimsically posed as if they were flying, on seven mural panels originally installed on the walls of Concourse A at Eugene Airport.

Popular Photography described the subjects as "People with extended arms, carrying such items as briefcases, blueprints, teddy bears, or a tray of wine and pastry. People wearing business clothes or jogging outfits or nothing at all (discreetly covered by a fluffy cloud)… people expressing the exhilaration of flying."

Artist David Joyce explained, "I thought, 'Wow, what if you could just hold out your arms and fly yourself? Superman! Mighty Mouse!'" The resulting photographic sculpture has been described as "one of the most beloved art installations in Lane County".

Among the people was writer and performer Garrison Keillor, who was in Eugene for a show when the work was being created; his image was the only one of a non-local person used. Other notable people in the work include cartoonist Jan Eliot.

== History ==
David Joyce received a US$15,000 commission in 1988 for an installation of his artwork as part of the remodeling of the airport. He posed his volunteer subjects in flying position on a padded mat, and photographed them with a 35 mm camera while he was standing on a ladder. He then used mural paper to create prints that were approximately two-thirds life-size. Along with his assistant Rick Ball, he adhered the images to plywood, which Ball cut out using a jigsaw. At the time, Ball was an art student at Lane Community College and had answered a “help wanted” ad from Joyce. After the images were finished, Joyce and Ball installed the images. Ball said of the experience "David was my first mentor in the arts. Because of David, I became aware of the significance of public art." Due to David's influence, Ball would become a member of the Springfield Arts Commission which was responsible for the installation of the controversial "Balancing Act" sculpture that was installed in front of Springfield City Hall.

In 2011 the 22-year-old installation was dismounted, refurbished and replaced following a repair to a leak in the airport's wall. The cost of refabrication was supported by 1% for Art funds and an auction of some of the original figures.

Flight Patterns was again removed during the airport's planned expansion in 2015–2016, and was temporarily displayed at the David Joyce Gallery, Building 19 on the campus of Lane Community College. The airport, in consultation with Joyce's widow Kacey Joyce, considered whether to permanently remove the artwork and display it instead at the college. Upon learning that it might not be re-installed at the Eugene Airport, Eugene's then-Mayor Kitty Piercy said that the "flying people" are "iconic and part of our art history".

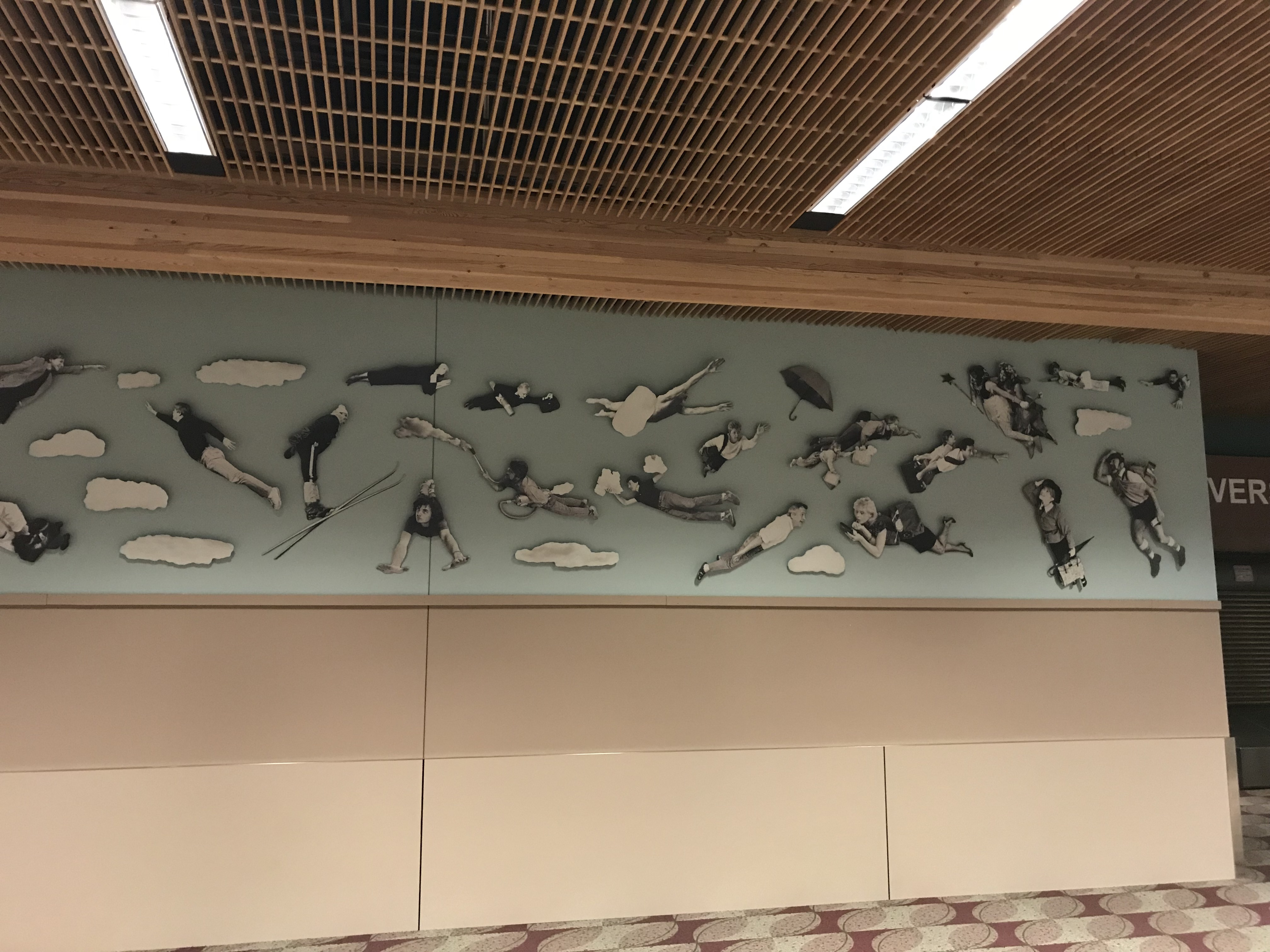
Flight Patterns in December 2017

In early January 2017, the airport's passenger terminal renovations were completed, and airport management decided "to take a comprehensive look and see where public art can be placed". The airport had paid Lane Community College US$5000 to install the art in the David Joyce Gallery on campus, but the gallery could not display all the images at once. Lane President Mary Spilde said, "We've loved having it, but now that the renovation is complete we will work with the airport on returning it."

In December 2017, airport workers reinstalled many of the 176 original cutouts in the baggage claim area, leaving out approximately 30 of the images due to lack of space. One of the images the airport decided not to install was that of Garrison Keillor, following his firing by Minnesota Public Radio. According to The Register-Guard, "Mayor Lucy Vinis left open the possibility of the city reinstalling the Keillor photo in the future at the city-owned airport."

According to public art consultant Greta Latchford, "The 'flying people' remind us all that despite the latest developments in aviation technology, it's our human connection that matters most (at the airport)."
