= Cupcake Jones =

Defunct bakery and dessert shop in Portland, Oregon, U.S.

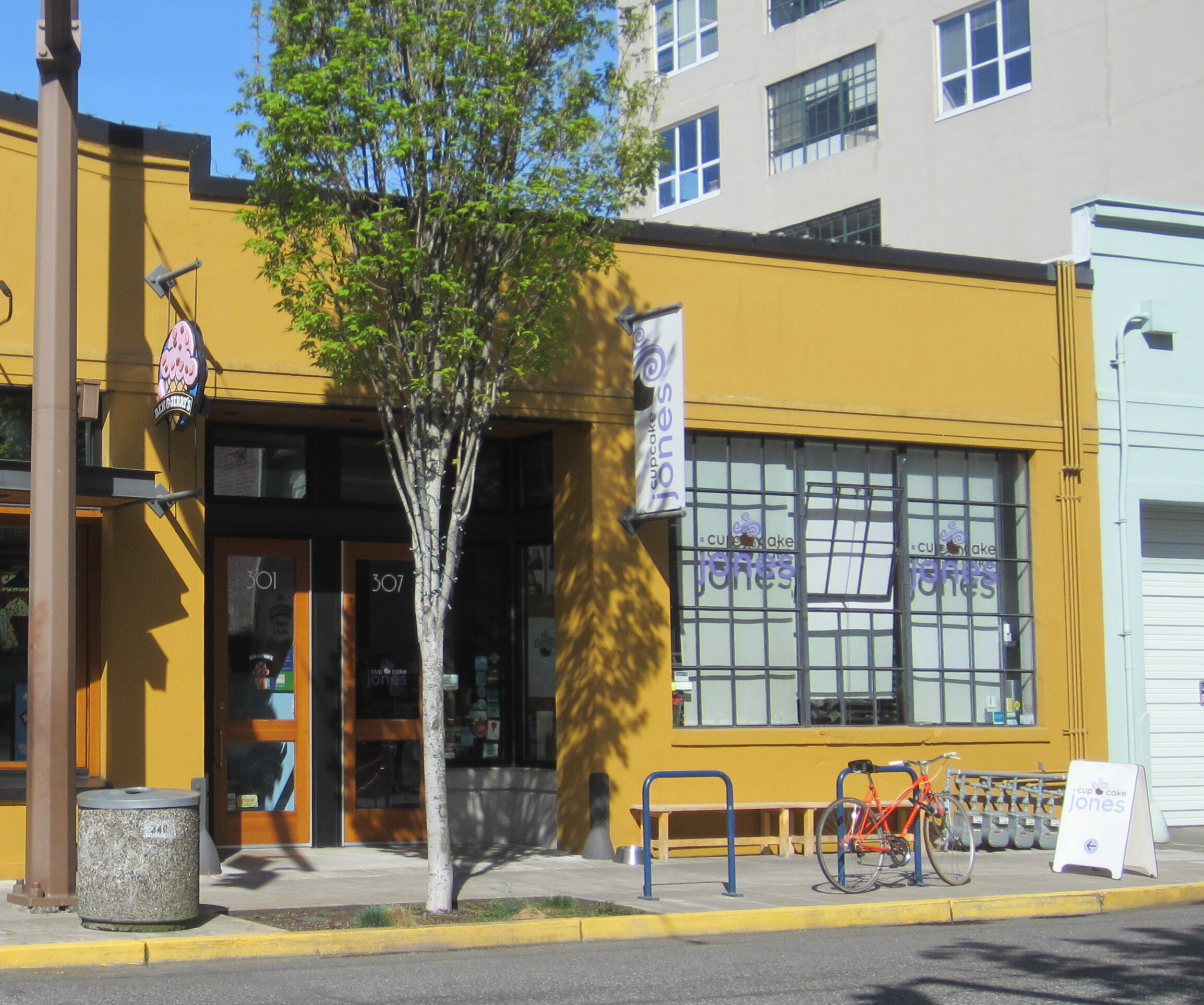
- Exterior of the shop in northwest Portland's Pearl District in 2014
- Interactive map of Cupcake Jones

Restaurant information
- Established: 2007
- Closed: 2019
- Owner: Melissa Jespersen
- Previous owners: Lisa Watson; Peter Shanky
- Location: 307 Northwest 10th Avenue, Portland, Multnomah, Oregon, 97209, United States
- Coordinates: 45.5252°N 122.6815°W

Cupcake Jones was a cupcake shop with two locations in Portland, Oregon, United States. Lisa Watson and Peter Shanky opened the original location in northwest Portland's Pearl District in 2007. An outpost opened on Alberta Street in northeast Portland's King neighborhood in 2014. The owners sold the business to Melissa Jespersen in 2017. Both Cupcake Jones locations closed abruptly in 2019.

== Description ==
Cupcake Jones was based in Portland, Oregon. The business operated in northwest Portland's Pearl District and on Alberta Street in northeast Portland's King neighborhood. Standard cupcake varieties included Boston cream, carrot, lemoncello, and red velvet. The business also offered gluten-free options as well as cupcakes for dogs. Cupcake Jones had seasonal specials. Cupcake varieties in October included apples 'n' pears, caramel apple (apple spice cake with caramel apple compote, caramel buttercream, caramel sauce, and candied apple chip), peanut butter cup (chocolate cake with chocolate peanut butter ganache, peanut butter icing, chocolate syrup, and peanuts), pumpkin cheesecake (white velvet cake with pumpkin cheesecake filling, pumpkin cheesecake icing, and graham cracker), and pumpkin chocolate chip.

== History ==
The business was established in 2007. Lisa Watson and Peter Shanky were the owners. In 2011, the business participated in "The Lucky 7", a project to help animals at the Oregon Humane Society get adopted. In 2012, Watson attributed the success of the bakery in part to its location along the Portland Streetcar. She said, "I honestly think the streetcar has built a destination. People go by in the streetcar and we'll see them looking out the window at us, pointing. Then they'll get off next stop and walk back."

In 2014, Cupcake Jones announced plans to open a second location in a 462-square-foot space near 14th Avenue and Northeast Alberta Street. The outpost opened in October. In 2015, customers could order Cupcake Jones products via Amazon's Prime Now.

In 2017, Watson and Shanky sold Cupcake Jones LLC to television producer Melissa Jespersen. Jespersen planned to keep the hours of operation, menu, and staff the same. In 2018, a man was arrested after stealing money from the tip jar at the Pearl District location. Desserts from Cupcake Jones were donated to the nonprofit organization Blanchet House, as of 2019.

Cupcake Jones closed abruptly in 2019.

== Reception ==
In 2010, Krista Houstoun of Willamette Week wrote, "I tried numerous cupcakes from the Pearl's (cough, yuppie) hotspot, Cupcake Jones, and let me assure you, these were all desert cakes of which I did not want more. Dry as Phoenix. I expected much from this cupcakery considering I read they are anti-vegan, proudly using heaps of butter and eggs. But, uh, where do these heaps go, Jones?" The newspaper's Kathryn Peifer said of the shop's seasonal varieties in 2014: "The pumpkin cupcake could have had more pumpkin flavor, but the rich texture and bold chocolate-mint flavor of the frosting made up for it. The apples 'n' pears is like stepping into a gingerbread house filled with lighted Yankee candles. The cream-cheese frosting isn't too sweet and offsets the spice and heavy fruit flavor in the cake."

Cupcake Jones was named Portland's favorite cupcake in The Oregonian's readers' poll in 2018. The business was selected for Oregon in The Daily Meal's 2017 list of the best cupcakes in each U.S. state. Cupcake Jones was also included in the website's 2012 and 2018 lists of the nation's 50 and 101 best cupcakes, respectively.

== See also ==
- List of bakeries
- List of defunct restaurants of the United States
