= LaNicia Duke =

American chef and activist

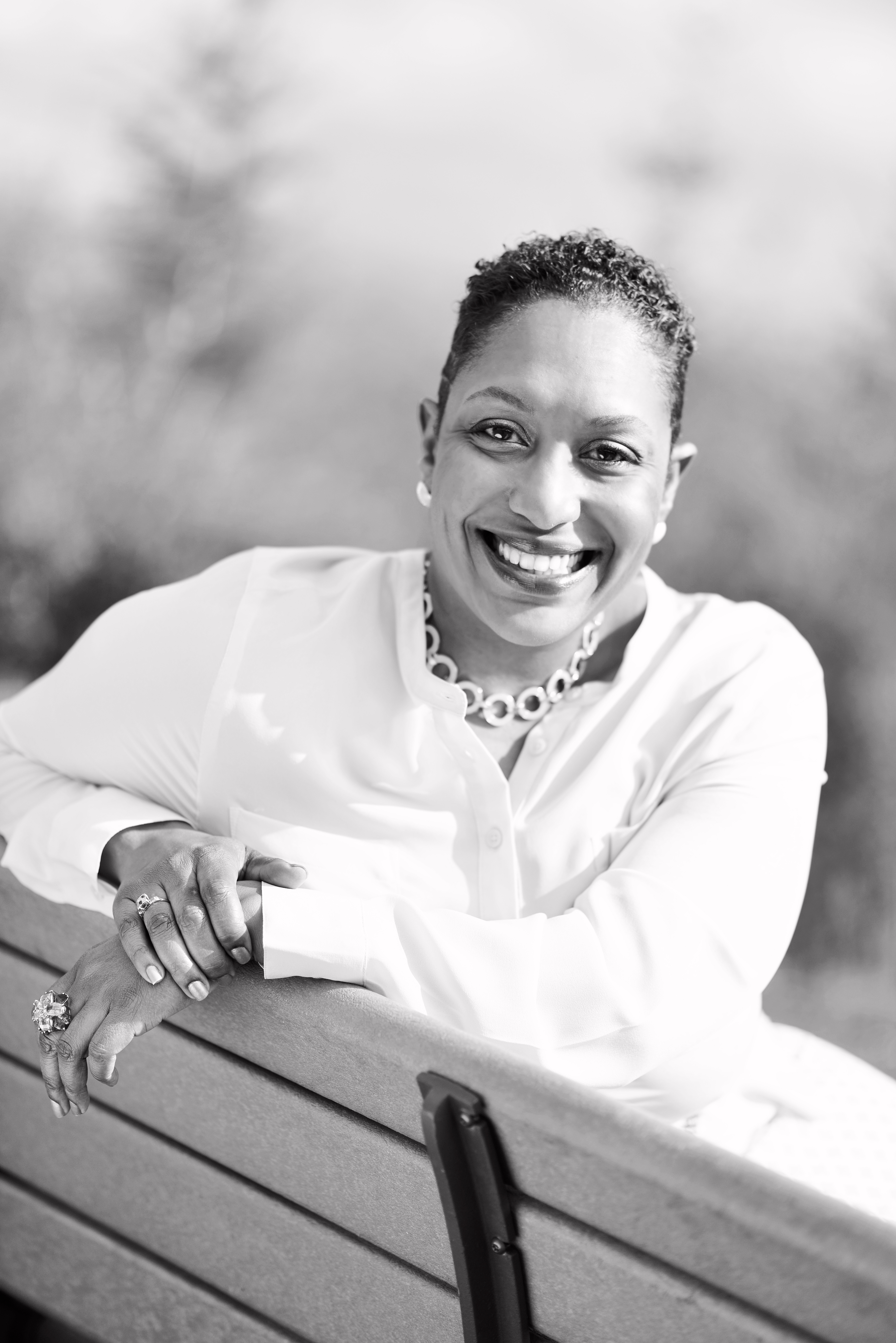
- Duke in 2023
- Born: Greater Los Angeles, California
- Years active: 2020–present
- Culinary career
- Cooking style: Community-focused, rural advocacy
- Current restaurant: Humble Beginnings (Founder)
- Awards won: Oregon Commission for Women Achievement Award (2023); Oregon Commission for Black Affairs Commissioner (2023)
- Occupations: Chef, Activist, Politician
- Known for: Black Rural Network; 2026 Oregon Gubernatorial Candidate

LaNicia Duke is an American chef and activist. She is the founder of Humble Beginnings. She has worked for Community Action Resource Enterprises. Duke announced her candidacy for governor of Oregon in 2026.

She was raised in Greater Los Angeles. She lived in Ogden, Utah in 2020, and Tillamook County, Oregon, in 2021.

She received an Oregon Women of Achievement award in 2023.
