= Alberta Arts District =

Commercial district in Portland, Oregon

- Commercial district
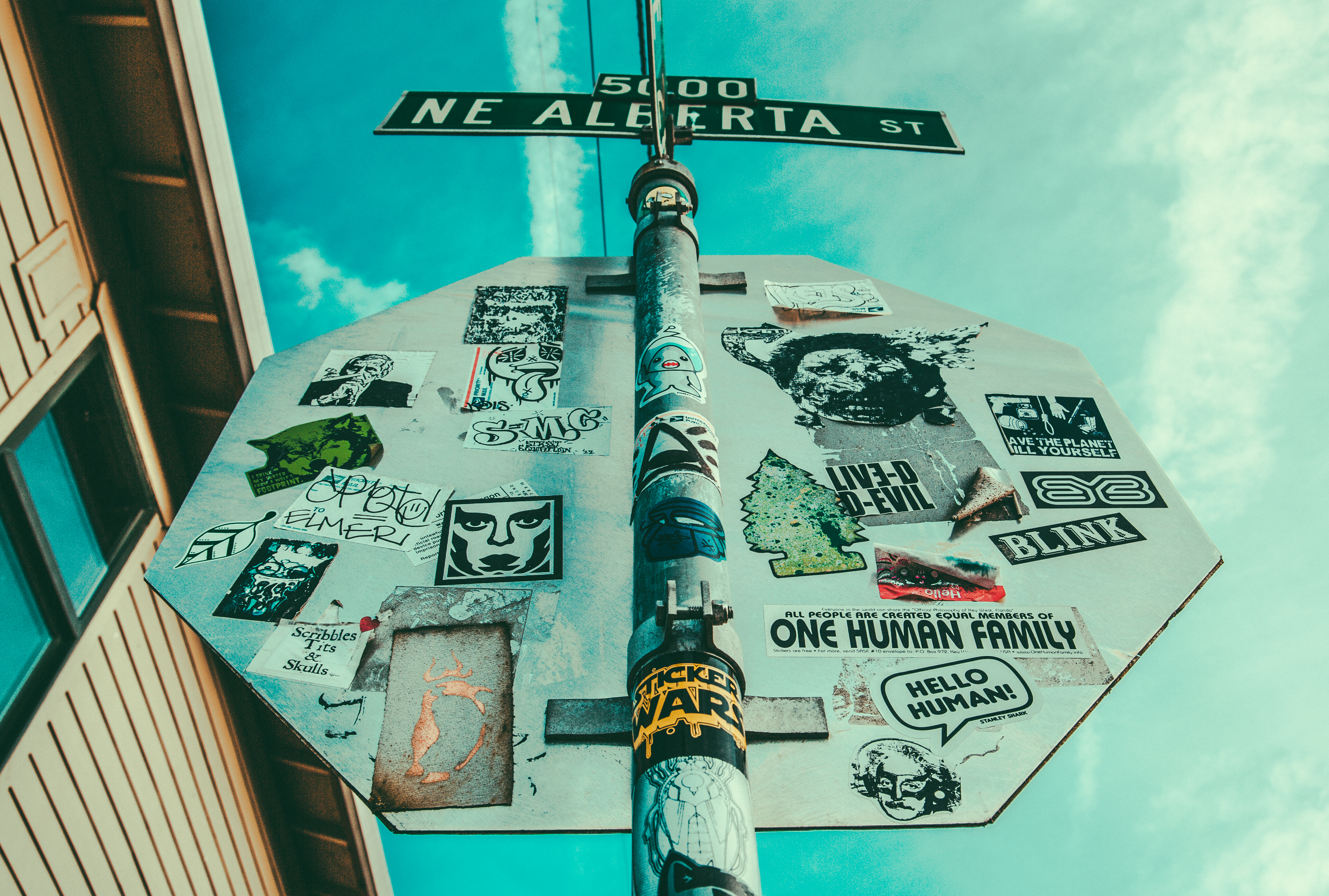

- Location within Portland, Oregon
- Coordinates: 45°33′33″N 122°38′34″W
- Country: United States
- State: Oregon
- City: Portland

Alberta Arts District is a commercial district in Portland, Oregon which connects the Concordia, King and Vernon neighborhoods in the Northeast quadrant of the city. The district centers on NE Alberta Street, and stretches approximately 1.5 miles (2.4 km), from Martin Luther King Jr. Boulevard to NE 33rd Avenue.

Alberta Street was once riddled with crime but began to be transformed in the early 1990s to what is now an "epicenter of youth and culture," lined with art galleries, restaurants, clothing boutiques and gift shops. The surrounding area has become popular with both young urban professionals and counterculture groups.

== History ==
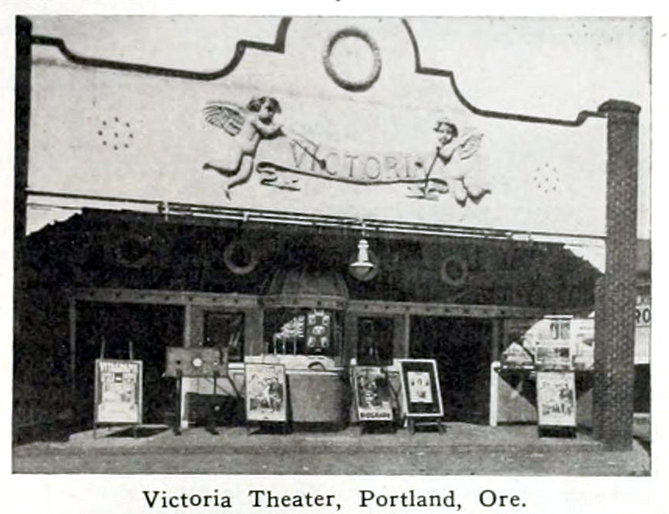
The Victoria Theatre on Alberta Street, 1916

Alberta Street was named after Princess Alberta and was first developed by immigrants in the 1880s with streetcar service beginning in 1903. Streetcar service brought additional pedestrian traffic and the commercial district began to flourish with business owners living in second-floor apartments above their establishments and modestly-sized homes being built during the housing booms of 1905–1913 and 1922–1928. A range of services could be found on Alberta Street, including grocery stores, barber shops, restaurants, a theater and a library. In addition, there were multiple religious institutions for the many ethnicities which lived on Alberta Street, which included many German and Russian immigrants who settled at the western end of Alberta Street.

In the 1950s, the Portland Development Commission (PDC) leveled hundreds of homes south of Alberta to make room for the development of Memorial Coliseum. The displaced residents of the predominantly minority and lower income area moved north to find new residences. Additional homes were cleared in the 1960s to make way for the Minnesota Freeway, now known as Interstate 5, which led to further displacement but also shifted traffic and investment away from Alberta Street. Redevelopment continued into the 1970s, with the expansion of Legacy Emanuel Medical Center leading to the destruction of nearly 300 homes and businesses in the predominantly black Albina neighborhood and their displacement to the Alberta area. The multiple publicly financed projects and the displacement it caused led to gangs, vandalism and violence on and around Alberta Street.

In 1981, after 66 years of business, the local landmark Rexall Pharmacy closed its doors due to the declining community and banks refused to provide mortgages in the area—even to qualified home buyers—and the area was allegedly redlined up through the late 1980s. Gang activity also reached unprecedented levels with the Bloods and Crips moving up from Southern California and bringing additional drug use and violence. Eventually, members of the Alberta community organized and formed two organizations: the North/Northeast Economic Development Task Force and the Sabin Community Development Corporation. The N/NE Economic Development Task Force envisioned a more prosperous Alberta Street and published an "action plan" centered around the development of small, neighborhood-oriented businesses which the City of Portland adopted in 1993. The Sabin CDC assisted in providing low income housing to residents within the Alberta area.

The public sector involvement was paramount in Alberta's revival, but credit is often given to Roslyn Hill, an artist and community activist, in turning around Alberta Street. She sought to maintain black ownership on the street and opened one of the first new businesses in 1993 when she purchased a dilapidated building from foreclosure and opened a garden cafe for the community. Soon after, others who shared Hill's vision opened additional businesses, and Magnus Johannesson purchased the old Rexall Pharmacy building to rent the upstairs space to artists with a coffee shop on the ground floor. Hill would go on to buy and fix up a dozen more buildings and insisted on renting them to community-minded tenants. From 1996 to 1999, the number of businesses nearly doubled, from 60 to 112.

In 1997, Alberta Street held its first art walk—referred to as Last Thursday—with art venues opening their doors and destinations shown on a monthly-published map. Participation was slow at first but eventually the event grew, and street vendors, musicians and street theater were also added. Art and artists were featured prominently as more independent and first time businesses and art galleries opened. The grassroots movement continued as more and more foot traffic came to Alberta Street and the community grew. Slowly, the area became known as an arts district, and the first time the words "Art District" was seen in print was on a local realtor's brochure and the term stuck.

In 2004 a group of business owners led by Diane Coward (Fuel Cafe) and Stacey Matney (PIE Footwear) banded together to create the Alberta Business Association which started to market the business on the street. When this proved successful, they were able to pitch the city for a Main Street Program to help strengthen the vibrancy of the neighborhood business district. With a full time Main Street program staff person helping to organize events and marketing Alberta Arts district became one of the most popular business districts in Portland.

== Culture ==
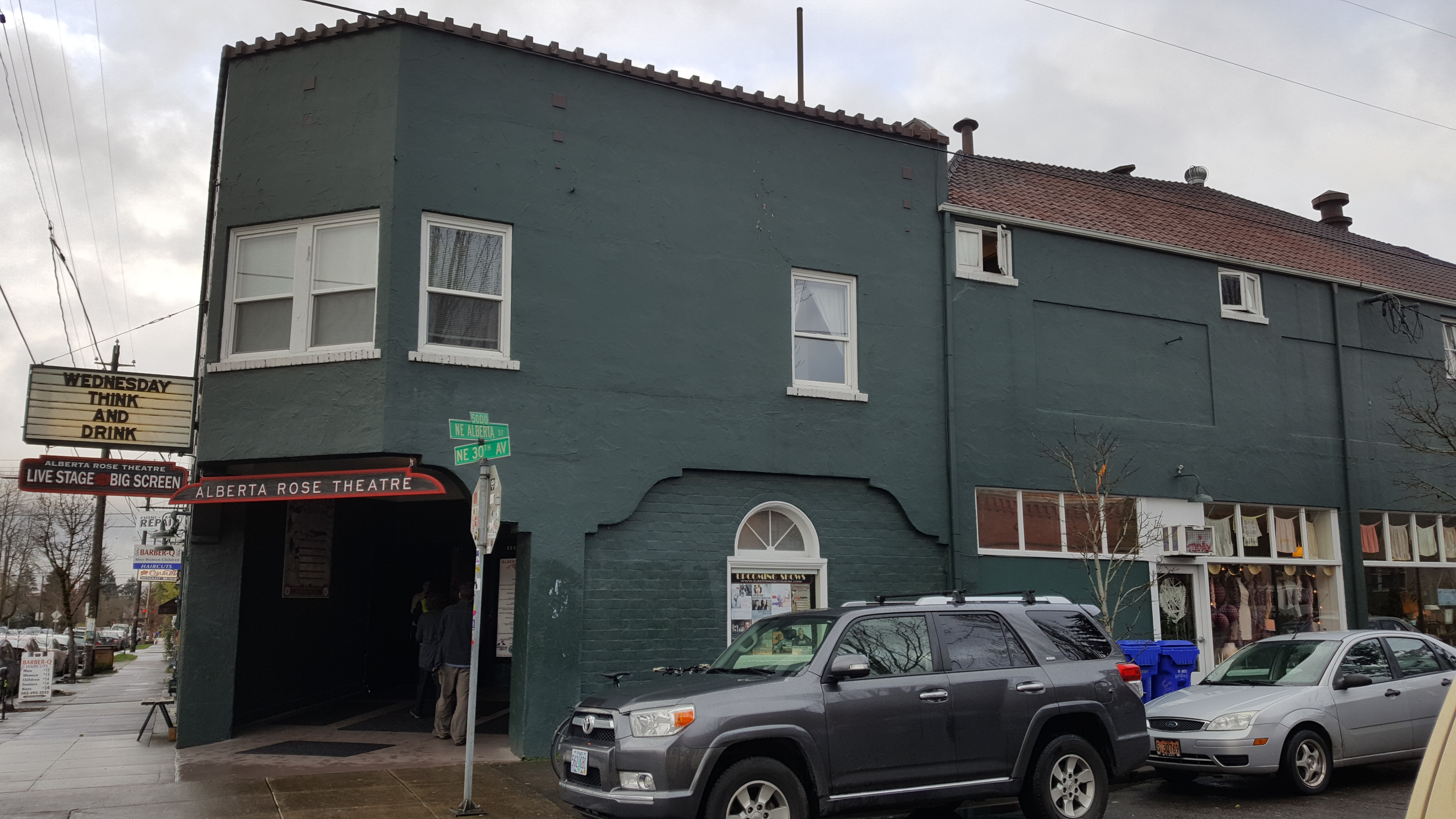
The Alberta Rose Theatre, 2017

On the last Thursday of every month, Alberta Street is home to the Last Thursday art walk which takes place in galleries and shops during the winter months, and outdoors during warmer weather, with tables set up by local artisans and traveling merchants along the sidewalk. Street performers and food carts also participate in the monthly event. The Alberta Clown House, "Part-vaudeville, part Burning Man, part bike repair shop, part hostel, and all-freak show," was an integral part of the carnival-like atmosphere of Last Thursday and other neighborhood events. The Alberta Clown House disbanded in 2007 due to rising rent along Alberta Street, members of the troupe remain in the community.

== Architecture ==
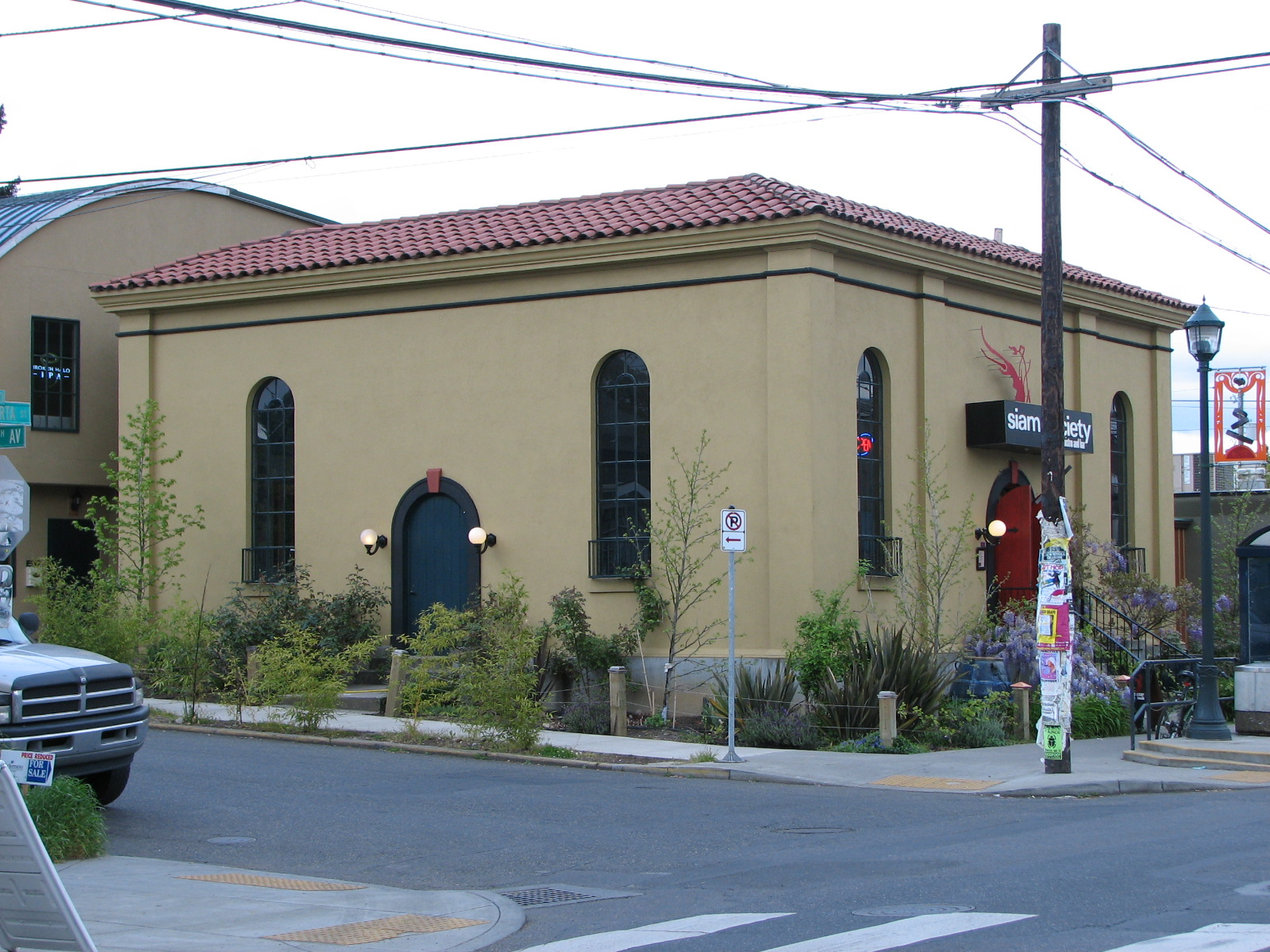
The Northwestern Electric Company – Alberta Substation, 2008

The Northwestern Electric Company – Alberta Substation, which was built in 1931 and is listed on the National Register of Historic Places, is located on Alberta Street. As of 2022, the building houses Bar Cala.

== Transit and transportation ==
Alberta Street is served by TriMet bus line 72 from Martin Luther King Jr. Boulevard to NE 30th Avenue. TriMet bus lines 6, 8, 17, and 70 intersect Alberta Street at Martin Luther King Jr. Boulevard, NE 15th, NE 27th and NE 33rd Avenues, respectively.

Bicycle boulevards parallel NE Alberta Street on NE Going Street and NE Skidmore Street.

== In popular culture ==
The song "Fat Alberta" by the Portland performance group MarchFourth! is about the gentrification of Alberta Street.

== See also ==
- Culture of Portland, Oregon
- List of streets in Portland, Oregon
