= Yamaguchi Hotel =

Historic building in Portland, Oregon, U.S.

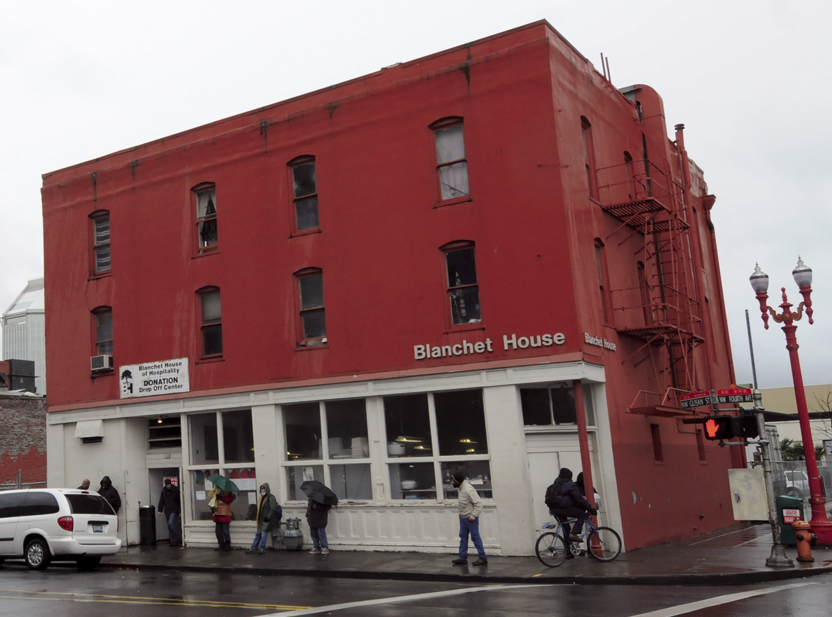
- Yamaguchi Hotel occupied by Blanchet House in 2009
- Interactive map of the Yamaguchi Hotel area

General information
- Location: Portland, Oregon, United States
- Coordinates: 45°31′35.5″N 122°40′27.5″W

The Yamaguchi Hotel was a historic building in Portland, Oregon, in the United States. Located at the intersection of 4th Avenue and Glisan Street in the northwest Portland part of the Old Town Chinatown neighborhood, the building was owned by Blanchet House and they still own the lot. It was built in 1909 and demolished on March 21, 2023

From 1921 to 1941 when this area was Japantown, it was the Yamaguchi Hotel.

From 1952 to 2012, it was used by Blanchet House as a House of hospitality offering meals and homeless services. In 1952, the building was known as the New Meyer Hotel. Blanchet House purchased the building in 1958 and operated its services at this building until it re-located next door in 2012. After Blanchet House moved nearby, the building sat vacant for 11 years until it was demolished.
