= Kathryn Jones Harrison =

Native American leader from Oregon (1924–2023)

- Born: March 28, 1924; Corvallis, Oregon, U.S.
- Died: May 21, 2023 (aged 99)
- Citizenship: Confederated Tribes of the Grand Ronde Community of Oregon and U.S.
- Education: Chemawa Indian School; Lane Community College
- Title: Chairwoman

Kathryn Jones Harrison (March 28, 1924 – May 21, 2023) was a leader of the Confederated Tribes of the Grand Ronde Community of Oregon.

== Early life and education ==
Kathryn May Jones was born in Corvallis, Oregon, on March 28, 1924. Her parents died from an influenza pandemic when she was ten years old. She was abused in foster care in Buxton, Oregon, before she attended Salem's Chemawa Indian School. During the 1970s, she enrolled at Lane Community College's School of Nursing.

== Career ==
After graduating from Lane, she worked at Lincoln City Hospital. She lived near the Siletz Reservation and was elected to serve as secretary of the Tribal Council. In 1976, she testified before Congress, advocating for federal tribal recognition. She returned to Grand Ronde to advocate for tribal status, which was granted in 1983. She has been credited with helping to pass the Reservation Restoration Act of 1988 and establishing Spirit Mountain Casino.

== Personal life and recognition ==
Kathryn Jones married Frank Harrison, a classmate from Chemawa. The couple had ten children.

Harrison received an honorary doctorate in Humane Letters from Portland State University and was named Alumna of the Year by Lane Community College. She has also been named an Oregon History Maker by the Oregon Historical Society.

On June 10, 2021, the superintendent of the Corvallis (OR) School Board recommended that Jaguar Elementary (formerly Jefferson Elementary) be renamed Kathryn Harrison Elementary. A naming ceremony took place at the school on May 5, 2022, with Kathryn in attendance.

Harrison died on May 21, 2023, at the age of 99.

== Bibliography ==
- Olson, Kristine (2005). Standing Tall: The Lifeway of Kathryn Jones Harrison, Chair of the Confederated Tribes of the Grand Ronde Community. Oregon Historical Society Press. ISBN 9780295985824.

== See also ==
- Oregon Women of Achievement
