= Bar Cala =

Restaurant in Portland, Oregon, U.S.

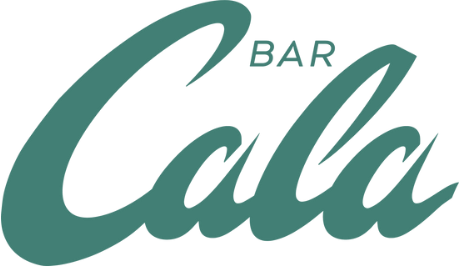

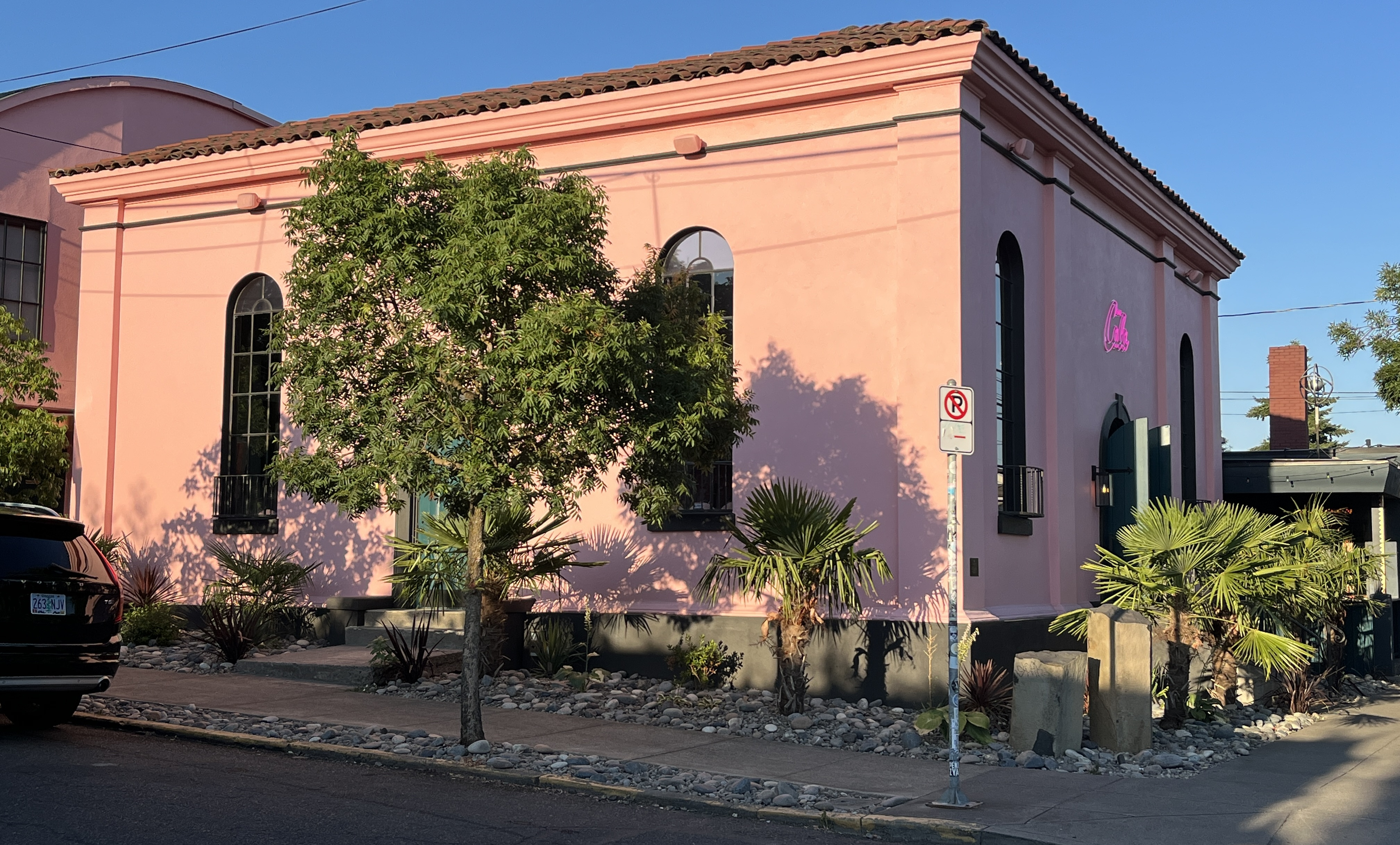
- The restaurant's exterior, 2022
- Interactive map of Bar Cala

Restaurant information
- Established: June 29, 2022
- Owner: Victor Daniel Cerda Zamorano
- Food type: Latin American
- Location: 2703 Northeast Alberta Street, Portland, Multnomah, Oregon, 97211, United States
- Coordinates: 45.5592°N 122.6377°W
- Website: barcalapdx.com

Bar Cala is a Latin American cocktail bar and restaurant in northeast Portland, Oregon's Concordia neighborhood, in the United States. Established in 2022, the business operates from the Northwestern Electric Company – Alberta Substation, a former electrical substation listed on the National Register of Historic Places.

== Description ==
Bar Cala is a Latin American cocktail bar and restaurant at the intersection of 27th and Alberta in the Alberta Arts District and northeast Portland's Concordia neighborhood. The business operates from a concrete and stucco building called the Northwestern Electric Company – Alberta Substation, a former electrical substation listed on the National Register of Historic Places. The exterior is painted pink and above the teal wooden door is neon sign with the text "Bar Cala" in cursive.

The interior features concrete-wood floors, cacti and palm trees, and Rattan light shades above the bar. A back patio has string lights and tables with umbrellas. Brooke Jackson-Glidden of Eater Portland said Bar Cala has a "breezy, cool" aesthetic. She wrote, "While the bar's food and drink derives most of its inspiration from Latin American countries and cuisines, the design of the space is meant to mimic the interior and landscape design of Palm Springs: Desert plants, gold midcentury modern light fixtures, a blend of indoor and outdoor aesthetics." The website's Alex Frane and Janey Wong wrote, "The bar's high ceilings are festooned with lush greenery and fairy lights, and music pumps steadily through the speakers, giving the place a Palm Springs party vibe." Bar Cala hosts dancing, disc jockeys, and Spanish music at night.

=== Menu ===
The menu has included burgers, steak with chimichurri and grilled octopus, as well as Mexican options like potato-carrot dorados, prickly pear aguachile with seafood, and fish tacos with salsa verde. Cocktails use spirits such as pisco and tequila. The Sandia Es Vida has Cappelletti, prosecco, watermelon, and grapefruit, and the La Toxica has serrano-infused tequila, watermelon juice, Aperol, and vermouth.

== History ==
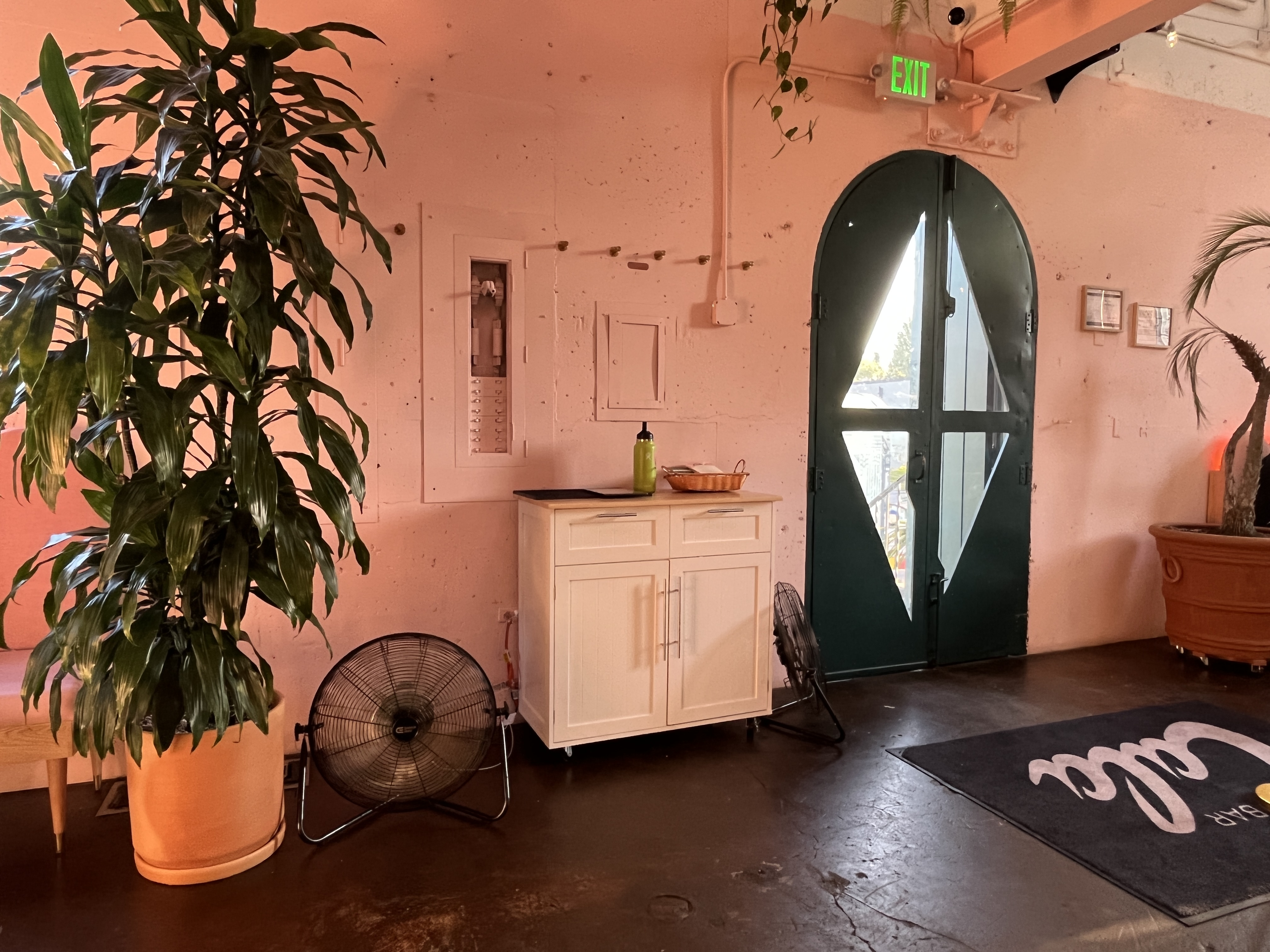
Interior, 2022

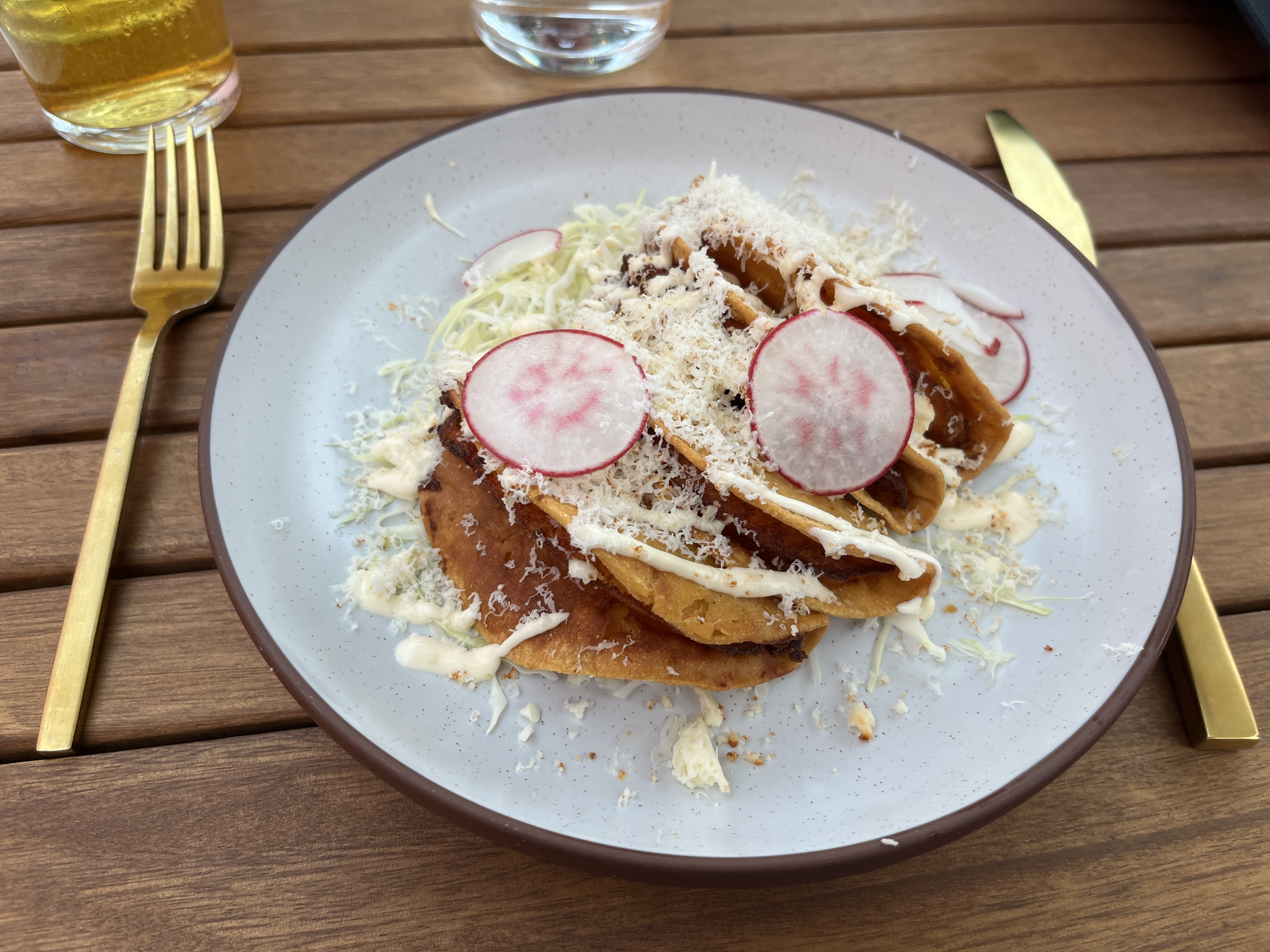
Dorados

Victor Daniel Cerda Zamorano opened Bar Cala on June 29, 2022, after purchasing the building with friend Fernando Damas. Mauricio Dimas created the food menu. During a heat wave in July, the restaurant temporarily changed the menu to focus on raw and fresh dishes to avoid oven usage.

Bar Cala's plant installations were completed by the Latino-, queer-, and vegan-owned plant shop Arium Botanicals. The bar hosted activities in conjunction with Cinco de Mayo in 2023. It has also hosted drag brunch.

== Reception ==
Michael Russell included Bar Cala in The Oregonian's list of Portland's 25 best new restaurants of 2022. He also called the bar's happy hour chips, guacamole and Tommy's margarita "the best excuse to quit work early".

In Portland Monthly's 2022 list of the city's top 50 bars, Matthew Trueherz wrote: "Bar Cala is, no doubt, a place to be seen. But pink neon and vibey tropical plants aside, this place knows how to put together a warm-weather cocktail 365 days a year. Expect loud music, cross your fingers you won't have to wait in line to get in, order the Tepaché Mode drink once you do, and snack on Bar Cala-monogrammed chips while you sip the fermented pineapple cocktail sitting on a gold stool at the bar." Brooke Jackson-Glidden also included the bar in the magazine's 2024 overview of the city's best bar patios.

In 2024, Meira Gebel included Bar Cala in Axios Portland's overview of the city's six best bar and restaurant patios, and Annie Harrigan included the business in Thrillist's list of ten bars "you can't leave Portland without trying". Jamie Cattanach included the Pineapple Sour in Willamette Week's 2024 list of "our four favorite mocktails in Portland right now".

== See also ==
- Hispanics and Latinos in Portland, Oregon
