= Jerralynn Ness =

Anti-poverty advocate

- Education: University of Oregon
- Occupation: Anti-poverty advocate

Jerralynn Ness (sometimes spelled Jerralyn) is an anti-poverty advocate in the U.S. state of Oregon, and served for many years as executive director of the Washington County Community Action Organization (WCCAO).

Ness graduated from Tigard High School in 1966. She studied art at the University of Oregon, and lived in Mexico City for part of 1969. She later joined Vista. described taking a job at WCCAO as a way to give back service to her community. As of 1993, Ness had worked in social service for 20 years, and had served for nine years as executive director of Community Action. She was credited in 1993 with having built up the organization's programs for hunger and homelessness to a point where it served about 28,500 people, 75 percent of Washington County's low-income population. She was still serving as executive director as of 2004. She retired in 2015.

She married Bernie Thurber, with whom she has a daughter, Amie. She has been noted as a collector of Monterey Furniture.

She has earned several awards and honors, among them the 2003 Oregon Woman of Achievement award.
