= Lane Community College =

Oregon community college

Coordinates: 44.01007°N 123.03284°W

- Motto: Transforming Lives Through Learning
- Type: Public community college
- Established: October 19, 1964
- Academic affiliations: League for Innovation in the Community College; Space-grant
- President: Stephanie Bulger
- Students: 15,000+
- Location: Eugene, Oregon, United States
- Campus: * Main Campus: 30th Avenue, Eugene; Downtown Center, Eugene; Cottage Grove Center; Florence Center; Lane Aviation Academy, Eugene Airport
- Sporting affiliations: NWAC
- Mascot: Ty the Titan
- Website: lanecc.edu

Lane Community College is a public community college in Eugene, Oregon, with additional facilities in downtown Eugene, Florence, Cottage Grove, and the Lane Aviation Academy at Eugene Airport. As of 2023–2024, Lane serves more than 15,000 credit and non-credit students annually in a 5,000 square-mile (~8047 km^{2}) service district, including most of Lane County as well as individual school districts in Benton, Linn, and Douglas counties.

== History ==
In 1964, Lane County citizens voted overwhelmingly to establish Lane as a comprehensive community college (approving it 5,944 to 1,282). The new college was able to build upon successful traditions of the Eugene Vocational School, which had been established in 1938 to provide manual education and training to high school students and unemployed adults.

== Organization and administration ==
Lane is governed by a Board of Education consisting of seven publicly elected, unpaid members who have responsibility for establishing policies and overseeing programs and services of the college. Lane is one of seventeen Oregon community colleges authorized by the Oregon legislature and regulated by the Oregon Office of Community Colleges and Workforce Development.

== Academics ==
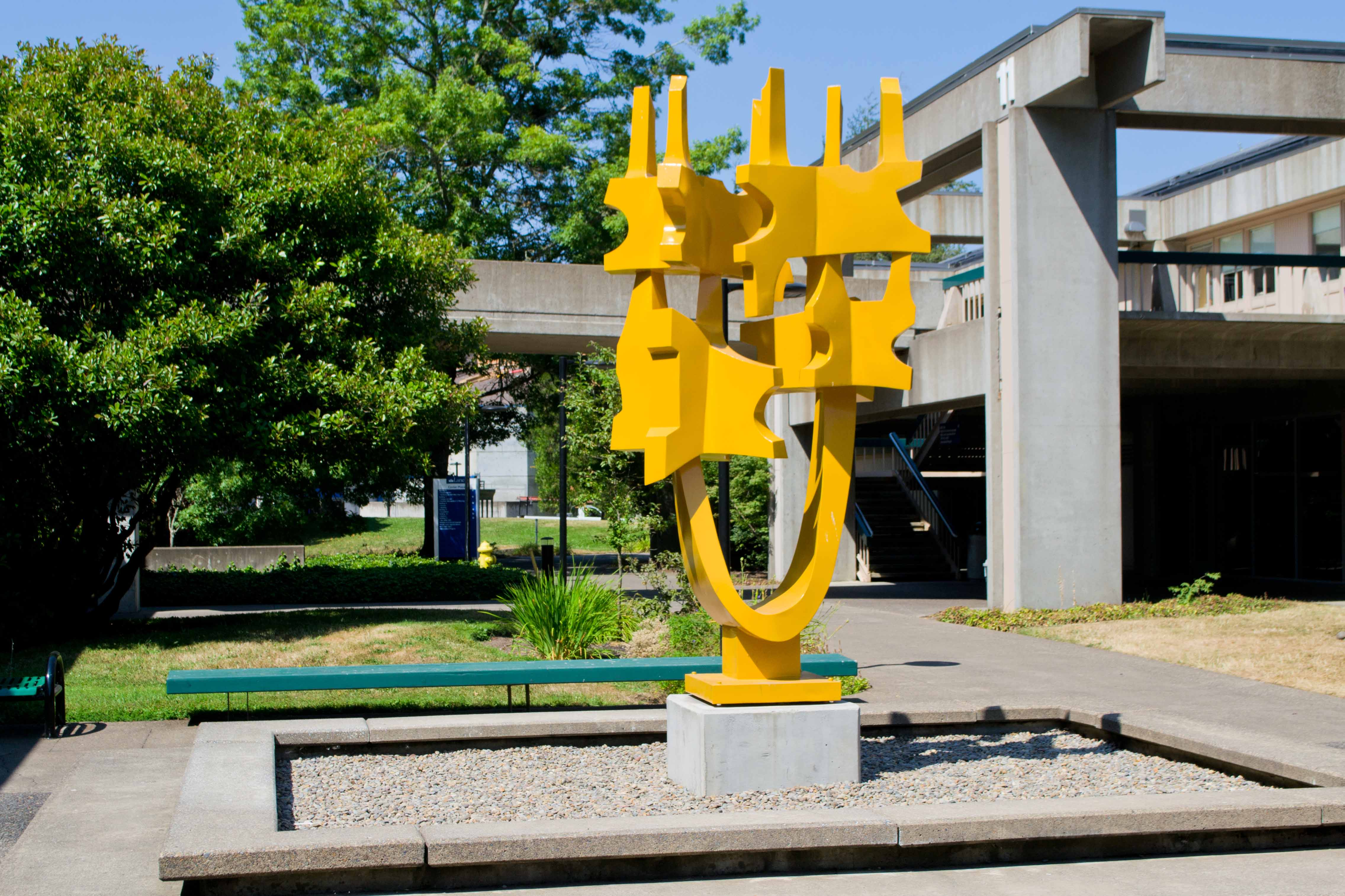
Main campus

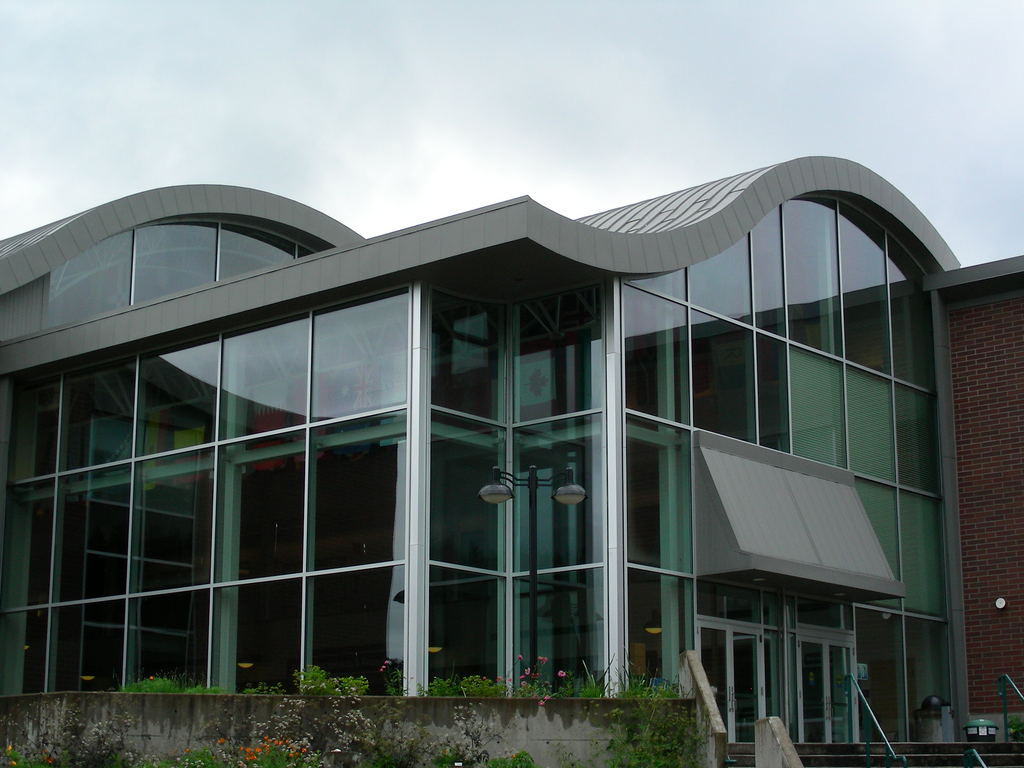
Lane Community College Building 1

Lane Community College offers two-year transfer associate degrees, career-technical applied associate degrees and certificates, as well as non-credit career training, English as a Second Language (ESL), and General Education Development (GED) classes. As of September 2024, Lane began offering a Bachelor of Applied Science degree.

=== Accreditation ===
Lane is accredited by the Northwest Commission on Colleges and Universities (NWCCU). Individual career programs are also recognized and accredited by career and vocational associations.

== Campuses ==
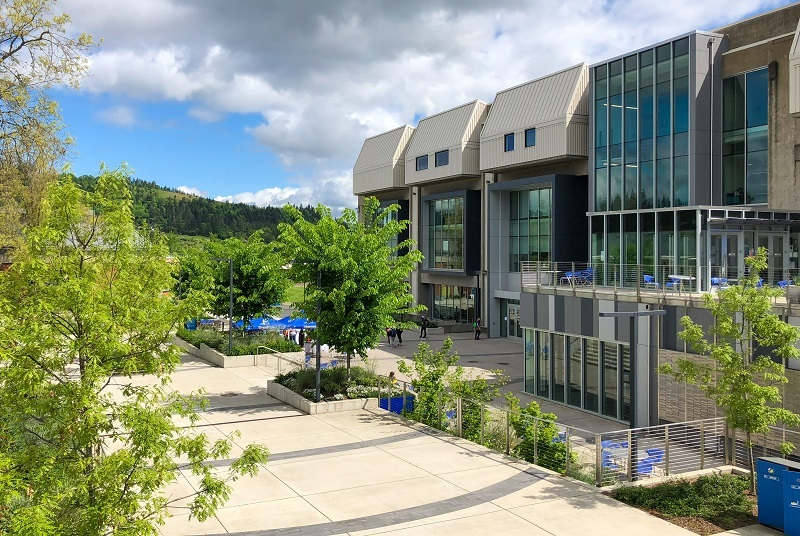
Main campus view of Dr. Dale P. Parnell Center for Learning and Student Success

The main campus is located in central Lane County between south Eugene and Springfield, just west of I-5.

Mary Spilde Center campus in downtown Eugene

The Mary Spilde Center and student housing complex, Titan Court, are located in downtown Eugene, across from the Eugene Public Library. The Mary Spilde Center offers continuing education, non-credit classes, adult education and GED preparation, and ESL classes. It also houses the Lane Small Business Development Center and an Americorps Senior Companion Program.

The Cottage Grove Center and Florence Center offer continuing education, GED preparation, and other community classes.

The Lane Aviation Academy at the Eugene airport houses programs: Aviation Professional Pilot and Aviation Maintenance Technician. The Lane Aviation Academy also offers an Aviation Unmanned Aircraft Systems (drone) program, which holds classes on the main campus.

== Culture ==
Lane's campuses include a Learning Garden for students, landscaping with native plants, electric vehicle charging, use of solar energy, and many LEED certified buildings. Lane has also earned a Silver Sustainability Tracking, Assessment & Rating System (STARS) rating and Bee Campus certification.

Sculptures made by students and faculty can be found throughout campus. Art is also represented by two art galleries, a Center for Performing Arts, a literary magazine, and an Art-o-mat.

Lane has many student clubs and six student identity unions: the Asian and Pacific Islander Student Union (APISU), the Black Student Union (BSU), the Gender & Sexuality Alliance (GSA), Movimiento Estudiantil Chicano de Aztlán (MEChA), the Native American Student Association (NASA), and the Neurodivergent Student Union.

In December 2010, the school became the second community college in the United States to open a tribal longhouse, after Peninsula College, which opened its longhouse in 2007. The college has over 650 American Indian students, and annually hosts one of the largest powwows in the Pacific Northwest. Since 2006, the college has offered two years of Chinuk WaWa language study that satisfy second-language graduation requirements of Oregon public universities.

== Public radio station ==
The public radio station KLCC began broadcasting in February 1967. Lane Community College owns the license for NPR affiliate KLCC. The station broadcasts at 89.7 FM in Eugene and on various repeater frequencies, serving 88,000 listeners each week in Western and Central Oregon. KLCC offers NPR News, local news, and an eclectic music blend. KLCC airs NPR's All Things Considered, Morning Edition and Weekend Edition, along with Wait, Wait, Don't Tell Me, and other news and talk shows. On weekends KLCC airs a mix of music shows including jazz, blues, folk, Americana, Celtic and world music.

== Athletics ==
Lane Titans compete in ten varsity sports and participate in the Northwest Athletic Conference (NWAC) with 35 other Oregon, Washington, and Canadian colleges.

== In popular culture ==
Getting Straight, starring Elliott Gould and Candice Bergen, was filmed at Lane in 1969. As the campus was still under construction at the time, the "occupation scenes" were easier to shoot.

The Grateful Dead performed a concert on campus as a benefit for the college and White Bird Clinic on January 22, 1971, drawing a crowd of approximately 7,000 fans.

In January 1996, KLCC reporter Alan Siporin covered the arrival of Keiko, the orca of Free Willy fame, at his new home in the Newport Oregon Coast Aquarium for National Public Radio and the Discovery Channel.

In August 1996, Warner Bros. shot a scene for the film Prefontaine at Lane because the track's black surface fit the "vintage" time period of the 70s. The track was upgraded weeks later, and resurfaced in blue.

== Alumni ==
- Rachel Bitecofer, political scientist
- Suzanne Bonamici, politician
- Melody Carlson, author
- Kathryn Jones Harrison, tribal leader
- Paul Holvey, politician
- Cyrus Hostetler, Olympic javelin thrower
- Teresa Alonso Leon, politician
- John Lively, politician
- James Manning Jr., politician
- Keynan Middleton, professional baseball pitcher
- Tom Pappas, decathlete
- José Luíz Barbosa, four time Olympian

== See also ==
- List of Oregon community colleges
