= American College & University Presidents' Climate Commitment =

US Climate Change commitment group

Started in 2006, the American College & University Presidents' Climate Commitment (ACUPCC) was a “high-visibility effort” to address global warming (global climate disruption) by creating a network of colleges and universities that had committed to reduce their greenhouse gas emissions and accelerate the research and educational efforts of higher education to equip society to re-stabilize the Earth's climate. This work reflects global sustainable development efforts.

In October 2006, planning sessions were held at Arizona State University with the twelve founding signatory Presidents, Second Nature, ecoAmerica, and AASHE. ACUPCC was launched in December 2006, when the founding Presidents sent a letter to nearly 400 of their peers to invite them to join in the initiate. In June 2007, with a signatory group of 284, the ACUPCC was launched to the public at the first Climate Leadership Summit. Part of ACUPCC's goals were to encourage higher education institutions to give their students tools to think with a sustainable perspective for the future.

Today, Second Nature is the primary organization responsible for managing what is now known as the "Presidents' Climate Leadership Commitments". Second Nature is a nonprofit organization that "has worked with over 4,000 faculty and administrators at hundreds of colleges and universities to help make the principles of sustainability fundamental to every aspect of higher education.". This work continues under Second Nature's Climate Leadership Network.

== Mission ==
The ACUPCC sought (and the Presidents' Climate Leadership Commitments continue to seek)sought to create connections with higher educational institutions in order to carry out two goals:

- Have colleges and universities sign an agreement committing to eliminate their net greenhouse gas emissions from specified campus operations.
- Focus on education and the higher education institutions’ ability to promote research from sustainability programs and empower the higher education sector to educate students, create solutions, and provide leadership-by-example for the rest of society.

The Climate Commitments provide a framework and support for America's colleges and universities pursuing carbon neutrality and resilience. The program and collaboration relies on institutions of higher education to be role models for their communities as well as students, and to educate people who will contribute to fighting to reverse global warming and create a sustainable society.

== ACUPCC Agreement ==
ACUPCC institutions agreed to:

- Complete a greenhouse gas emissions inventory.
- Set a target date and interim milestones for becoming climate neutral (within two years of commitment).
- Take immediate steps to reduce greenhouse gas emissions by choosing from a list of short-term actions.
- Integrate sustainability into the curriculum and make it part of the educational experience.
- Make the action plan, inventory, and progress reports publicly available.

Second Nature's Presidential Climate Commitments have these same commitments in addition to:

- Complete annual greenhouse gas emissions inventories
- Creating internal university structures to implement commitments
- Update university climate action plans every five years.

== 12 founding ACUPCC signatories ==
- Loren Anderson, president, Pacific Lutheran University
- Michael Crow, president, Arizona State University
- Nancy Dye, president, Oberlin College
- Jo Ann Gora, president, Ball State University
- David Hales, president, College of the Atlantic
- Bernard Machen, president, University of Florida
- Gifford Pinchot III, president, Bainbridge Graduate Institute
- Kathleen Schatzberg, president, Cape Cod Community College
- Mary Spilde, former president, Lane Community College
- Douglas Treadway, president, Ohlone College
- Darroch Young, chancellor, Los Angeles Community College District
- Paul Zingg, president, California State University, Chico

== Evolution ==
By 2010, a total of 697 universities and colleges in all 50 states and the District of Columbia, representing a student population of over 5.6 million as signatories.

Current and reporting signatories are accessible via Second Nature's reporting platform.
