= Nancy Golden =

Education leader in Oregon

- Born: Nancy Lee Golden; 1951 (age 73–74)
- Occupation: Educational administration

Academic background
- Education: University of Denver, B.S., 1973
- Alma mater: University of Oregon, M.S., 1974; Ph.D., 1987
- Thesis: The Use of a Computer Networking System to Obtain and Analyze Group Responses during Classroom Lectures

Nancy Golden (born 1951) is the first Professor of Practice in the College of Education at the University of Oregon. She has been a leader in education as Oregon's chief education officer, as former education policy advisor to Oregon Governor John Kitzhaber, and as Superintendent of Springfield School District.

== Early life and education ==
A native of Utica, New York, in 1973 Golden earned a B.S. in elementary education at the University of Denver. In 1974 she earned an M.S. in special education at the University of Oregon, with a specialization in severe cognitive disabilities and learning disabilities. She completed her dissertation, The Use of a Computer Networking System to Obtain and Analyze Group Responses during Classroom Lectures, for her 1987 Ph.D. in curriculum and instruction at the University of Oregon.

Golden is married to Roger Guthrie, and she has adult children and two grandchildren.

== Career ==
In 1974, Golden began working as a special education teacher in Eugene, Oregon. She then became director of educational support services for Eugene's schools, and from 1993 to 1997 she served as Albany School District assistant superintendent of instruction, where she was "responsible for updating instructional programs, selecting educational materials, overseeing educational research and assisting individual schools".

From 2003 to 2013 Golden was Superintendent of Springfield School District in Springfield, Oregon. She began to serve additionally as education policy advisor for Governor Kitzhaber in 2011, and she was named Chief Education Officer of the Oregon Education Investment Board in 2013, "charged with remaking education from preschool through grad school to dramatically increase how many Oregonians become well-educated." She retired from that position in 2015.

She is Professor of Practice, Educational Methodology, Policy and Leadership at the University of Oregon, and Director, Oregon Research Schools Network.

== Selected publications ==
- Golden, Nancy; Gall, Joyce P. (2000). The Complete Toolkit for Building High-Performance Work Teams. ERIC Clearinghouse on Educational Management. ISBN 978-0-86552-144-5.
- Golden, Nancy; Lane, Marilyn (1998). A Seven-Step Process To Align Curriculum with Oregon State Content Standards. Vol. 42. Oregon School Study Council.
- Golden, Nancy; Gersten, Russell; Woodward, John (January 1, 1990). "Effectiveness of Guided Practice during Remedial Reading Instruction: An Application of Computer-Managed Instruction". The Elementary School Journal. 90 (3): 291–304. doi:10.1086/461619. ISSN 0013-5984. S2CID 143615176.
- Woodward, John; Carnine, Douglas; Gersten, Russell; Moore, Lisa; Golden, Nancy (June 1, 1987). "Using Computer Networking for Feedback". Journal of Special Education Technology. 8 (4): 28–35. doi:10.1177/016264348700800403. ISSN 0162-6434. S2CID 63561836.
- Golden, Nancy; Maydet, Nancy (1985). "Mathematics, Routine Graphs". Learning: 8–9.
- Walker, Hill M.; McConnell, Scott; Holmes, Deborah; Todis, Bonnie; Walker, Jackie; Golden, Nancy. "The ACCEPTS program: A curriculum for children's effective peer and teacher skills." Austin, TX: Pro-Ed, 1988.
- Golden, Nancy; DeMarco, Joyce. "Integrated PE Class: An Effective Way to Mainstream Handicapped Children in the Regular PE Class." BEST Center, Eugene, 1980. Oregon: ERIC Clearinghouse on Educational Management, 2000.
- Golden, Nancy; Lane, Marilyn (1998). A Seven-Step Process To Align Curriculum with Oregon State Content Standards. Vol. 42. Oregon School Study Council.
- Golden, Nancy; Gersten, Russell; Woodward, John (January 1, 1990). "Effectiveness of Guided Practice during Remedial Reading Instruction: An Application of Computer-Managed Instruction". The Elementary School Journal. 90 (3): 291–304. doi:10.1086/461619. ISSN 0013-5984. S2CID 143615176.
- Woodward, John; Carnine, Douglas; Gersten, Russell; Moore, Lisa; Golden, Nancy (June 1, 1987). "Using Computer Networking for Feedback". Journal of Special Education Technology. 8 (4): 28–35. doi:10.1177/016264348700800403. ISSN 0162-6434. S2CID 63561836.

== Awards ==
- Oregon Superintendent of the Year Award, 2011
- Oregon Commission for Women, Women of Achievement Award presented in recognition of work to significantly improve the lives of women in Oregon, 2009.
