= Mississippi Street Fair =

Annual event in Portland, Oregon, U.S.

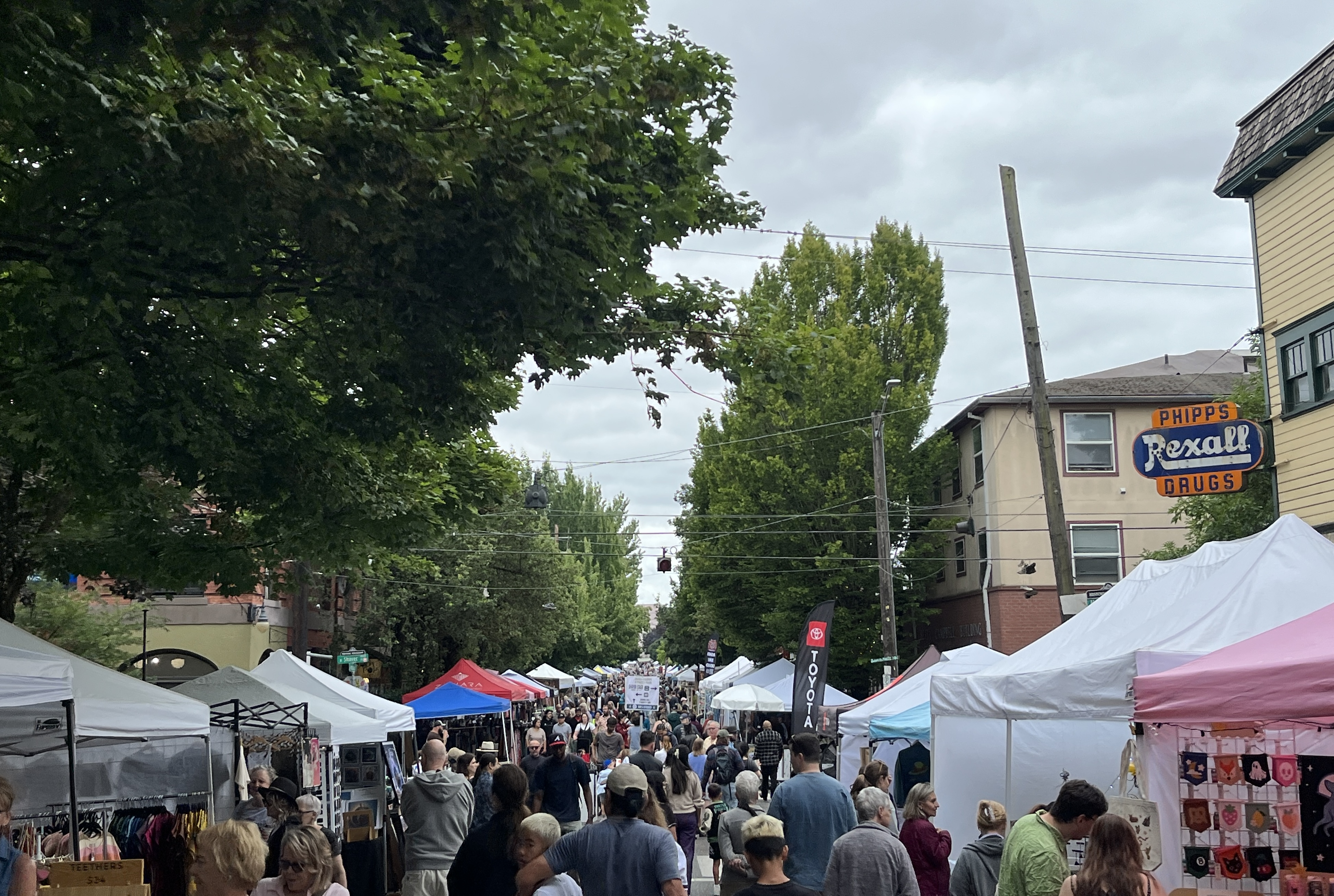
- The 2026 event
- Status: Active
- Genre: Street fair
- Location: Portland, Oregon
- Country: United States

The Mississippi Street Fair is a street fair in Portland, Oregon, United States. It is historically held on the second Saturday of July, along North Mississippi Avenue between Fremont and Skidmore Streets. Described as Portland's largest street fair, the family-friendly event attracts tens of thousands annually. It is supported by a local business association. The festival has activities for children and food competitions.

== History ==
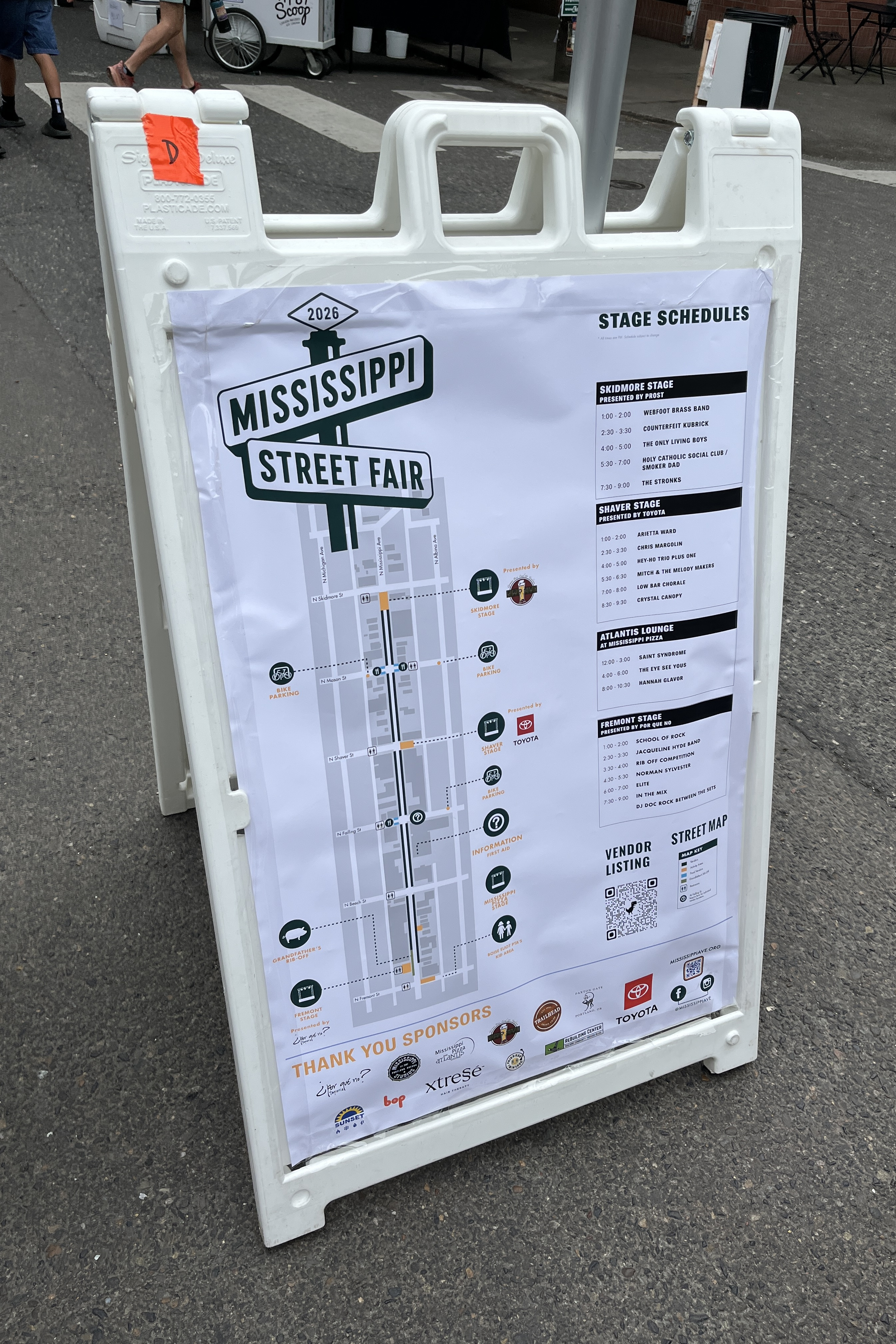
Sign for the event, 2026

The 2011 event had 100 vendors, five stages, and 36 music groups. The 2018 event had 200 local vendors, six stages, and 40 music groups.

== Reception ==
The Mississippi Street Fair won in the Best Neighborhood Event category of Willamette Week's annual 'Best of Portland' readers' poll in 2024 and 2025.

== See also ==
- Culture of Portland, Oregon
- First Thursday, Pearl District
- Last Thursday on Alberta
