= Roslyn Hill =

American community activist

- Occupation: Developer
- Known for: One of the original developers of what became the Alberta Arts District of Portland, Oregon

Roslyn Hill, sometimes called "The Queen of Alberta Street," was one of the original developers of what became the Alberta Arts District of Portland, Oregon, starting in the early 1990s.

She, working with business partners, is credited with redeveloping several blocks along Alberta Street, and pioneering the use of urban touches such as public art and corrugated metal siding paired with existing vintage structures.

Roslyn Hill is an important figure in the making and revitalization of the NE Portland, Alberta Arts District. The Alberta neighborhood consisting of the Martin Luther King Jr Boulevard and 33rd NE Avenue streets is a historical marker for the once thriving African-American Albina neighborhood of Portland. Roslyn Hill is a member of the Alberta Street Historical Markers Project which works to honor the history of the African American community on Alberta Street. Hill was honored by the national AARP in 2008 as an "urban-blight fighter."

== See also ==
- Oregon Women of Achievement
