= Y. Sherry Sheng =

Gardener and zoologist

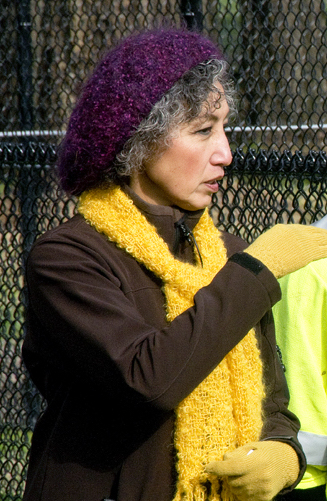
- Born: Taipei
- Education: National Taiwan University; University of Washington
- Known for: Director of Seattle Aquarium; Director of Oregon Zoo
- Awards: Oregon Women of Achievement

Y. Sherry Sheng is a horticulturalist, zoologist and philanthropist, who was given an Oregon Women of Achievement Award in 1990.

== Biography ==
Sheng was born in Taipei, Taiwan, to Chinese parents. She earned a BA in Zoology from National Taiwan University and an MA in Fisheries Biology from the University of Washington.

She was Deputy Director for the Oregon Economic & Community Development Department. She was Director of Oregon Zoo and Seattle Aquarium. During her leadership at Oregon Zoo the African Savannah and African Rainforest exhibits were created. In 2016 she joined the Board of Directors of the Center for Inquiry.

In 2020 she and her husband Spike Wadsworth made a $503,000 endowment to Oregon State University in order to establish the Y. Sherry Sheng and Spike Wadsworth Master Gardener Professorship Fund. In 2012 they also donated $1.2million as a gift to the Master Gardener Programme. Sheng has been Clackamas County Master Gardener since at least 2012.

== Awards ==
- Agricultural Hall of Fame at Oregon State University - 2018.
- Oregon Women of Achievement Award - 1990.
