= Joan Priscilla Kilbourn =

Microbiologist and educator

Joan Kilbourn (15 June 1936 — 10 May 2011) was an American microbiologist and educator.

== Early life and education ==
Kilbourn was born June 15, 1936, in Juneau, Alaska. Her parents were Iris (née Chenoweth) and Jesse Payne.

Kilbourn attended Willamette University from 1954 to 1957 before transferring to the University of Oregon Medical School to finish her B.S. degree in general science 1958. She earned her M.S. in Microbiology in 1960, and had a special interest in Biochemistry.

In 1963, Kilbourn earned a Ph.D. in Microbiology from Oregon State University, again focusing on Biochemistry and adding the study of Mathematics; her dissertation was titled "Use of a Radiation Resistant Organism as a Protectant from Lethal Effects of Irradiation in Mice."

== Employment ==
After completing her Ph.D., Kilbourn held a variety of positions, including teaching university students in the University of Oregon's Biology Department and continuing education classes for medical technologists at Portland State University, Clackamas Community College, and Physicians Medical Laboratory. She also worked at OHSU's Microbiology and Pediatrics departments and for the Veterans Affairs Hospital.

Kilbourn started the Consulting Clinical and Microbiological Laboratory in 1984 and oversaw its operation until her health declined in 2002.

== Awards and service ==
Kilbourn was recognized by the American Association for the Advancement of Science, Willamette University, and as an “Oregon Women of Achievement” by the State of Oregon for her work in science.

Kilbourn co-founded a chapter of Iota Sigma Pi and served as president.
