= Mary Spilde =

American community college President Emerita (born 1951)

Mary Spilde President emerita
- Born: Mary Jenkins; 1951 (age 74–75); Scotland
- Other name: Mary F. T. Spilde
- Citizenship: United States of America

Academic background
- Education: Bachelor's and law degrees, Edinburgh University (1972); Master of Education, adult education (1984) and Ph.D., Oregon State University (1996)
- Thesis: An Inquiry into the Contribution of the Oregon Workforce Quality Council to the Development of a World-class Workforce
- Doctoral advisor: Charles Carpenter

Mary Spilde (born 1951) is a retired president of Lane Community College in Eugene, Oregon, United States. She was named president emerita after 22 years at Lane, 16 as its president. She had also served in administrative roles at Linn–Benton Community College before being hired at Lane.

Her tenure at Lane highlighted her commitment to sustainability, diversity and equity, and her service in national higher education organizations.

The Association of Community College Trustees named her chief executive officer of the year in 2011, and Lane's board named the downtown center the Mary Spilde Center.

== Early life and education ==
Mary Spilde, one of four daughters of George and Eileen Jenkins, was born in Scotland in 1951. Her father, a baker, and her mother, a wartime nurse, had both left school in their teens, but Spilde has said they believed in education and expected their children to become professionals.

She earned a bachelor's degree in business and social systems as well as a law degree from the University of Edinburgh in 1972. Spilde told the Lane Board of Education she came to the U.S. with two suitcases, $1900 and an education. She married Gerald Spilde and they moved to Oregon in 1976.

Spilde earned both a 1984 master's degree in adult education and a 1996 doctorate in post-secondary education from Oregon State University. Charles Carpenter advised her dissertation, An Inquiry into the Contribution of the Oregon Workforce Quality Council to the Development of a World-class Workforce.

== Career ==
Spilde's first job in the U.S. was as a cashier at Kmart, and she was promoted within three days. She became a corporate trainer for several years.

=== Linn–Benton Community College ===
Hired at Linn–Benton Community College in 1980, Spilde worked 15 years teaching and in vice presidential roles. She first worked as coordinator of the RISE program (Reach Independence and Security Through Education) in Albany, a federally funded program through CETA (the Comprehensive Employment and Training Act). The program served homemakers without jobs, and also offered help to men on parole from prison to learn new skills to enter the job market. CETA funds were cut by 60% in 1981. The following year, anticipating another 22 percent cut, the funding agency decided the Albany RISE office must close.

In 1982, Spilde was hired as director of the Albany Community Education Center at Linn–Benton Community College. The following year, the program was expanded to "help new and existing industries attract and train qualified employees", becoming the Center for Training and Economic Development, the "TED Center". In 1984, Spilde was selected to participate in the "Leaders for the 80s" program sponsored by the League for Innovation in Community Colleges and the American Association of Women in Community and Junior Colleges. The General Federation of Women's Clubs named her "Oregon's Outstanding Young Woman of 1984". She was also listed in the publication Outstanding Young Women of America, honoring women "between 21 and 36 years old for their civic and professional achievements". In 1988, Spilde was appointed executive assistant to the college president, and she also continued as director of community education activities for all of Benton County. By 1991, her position was dean of business, training and health occupations.

=== Lane Community College ===
Spilde's 22-year career at Lane included 16 years as president. She joined Lane Community College in 1995 as vice president for instructional services, and then served as vice president for instruction and student services. She was appointed president of the college, beginning August 15, 2001, the first woman to hold that office at Lane.

==== Funding issues ====
Less than a month after Spilde became president, the college observed the nationwide Day of Remembrance, commemorating the September 11 attacks. The ensuing weak national economy led to budget cuts at the college. Spilde recalled, "It was February 22, 2002, and I went around and told 122 people that they weren't going to have jobs anymore. That was one of the most humbling experiences I've had at Lane."

In retrospect, Spilde identified a lack of funding as the biggest regret of her time as president. Dwindling state funding for higher education over the years meant the college had a greater dependence on tuition. Despite cost cutting, some curricular programs also had to be cut. The 2002–03 budget year, for example, included a 26 percent tuition increase and elimination of seven professional-technical programs. In two consecutive budget years, Spilde thanked the board of trustees for positive performance reviews, but refused to accept the pay raises they proposed for her. Board chair Roge Hall said, "Her committed, decisive, and focused leadership at both local and state levels, inspires confidence and a sense of stability even in these times of unstable state funding."

In 2011, Governor John Kitzhaber appointed Spilde as one of 12 members of the new Oregon Education Investment Board, "an effort to create a unified system for investing in and delivering public education from elementary to post-secondary". By 2015, however, Spilde resigned from the board over her "vehement opposition" to the recommendation to implement performance-based funding. She pointed to the lack of proof that it improves education, and also to the effect of punishing "colleges that take on the toughest students: first-generation college students, those from disadvantaged minority groups, and those who need remedial help".

==== Diversity and inclusion ====
In May 2002 Spilde convened an all-staff forum at Lane following several racial incidents on campus, including racial slurs and distribution of white power pamphlets. She said, "We're going to deal with it. We're going to stand up and talk about it and we're going to do something about it." That conversation led to establishment of clear consequences for harassment and expansion of diversity training at the college.

In February 2017, Lane's board of trustees passed Resolution 612, declaring the college a sanctuary campus in response to Executive Order 13769 limiting refugees from Muslim countries. Spilde had met with students from Syria and Iran and other countries included in the executive order banning immigrants, and said she was proud of the Board's resolution, which she fully supported.

==== Sustainability ====
When Spilde signed the Talloires Declaration in December 2005, Lane became the first Oregon community college to make a commitment to sustainability. The college began purchasing 10 percent wind power from Eugene Water & Electric Board, and bond construction projects were designed according to LEED standards for green building design. In 2006, Spilde became a charter member of the American College & University Presidents' Climate Commitment group. In 2014, Lane won a Green Genome Award from the American Association of Community Colleges, commended "for infusing sustainability concepts into the structure of college policies and procedures ... to apply principles of sustainable economics, resource use, and social institutions to learning and working environments".

==== Service ====
Spilde has served on national committees and boards, including the League for Innovation in the Community College and the American Association of Colleges and Universities, and she has served as chair of the board of the American Association of Community Colleges.

== Selected publications ==
- Spilde, Mary (2012). "Community Colleges Meeting the Challenge". In Martin, James (ed.). The Sustainable University: Green Goals and New Challenges for Higher Education Leaders. JHU Press. ASIN B07DFMN1YJ.
- Spilde, Mary F. T. (2010). "Role of Community Colleges in Creating a Workforce for the Green Economy". Green Careers in Energy. Lawrenceville, NJ: Peterson's. pp. 14–16. ISBN 978-0-7689-2860-0.
- Spilde, Mary (August 2009). "The Best and Worst of Times". Community College Journal. 80 (1): 6. ProQuest 207588855.
- Spilde, Mary (October 2009). "Seizing the Moment" (PDF). Community College Journal. 80 (2): 6.
- Spilde, Mary (December 2009). "More Learning, Higher Earnings". Community College Journal. 80 (3): 5. ProQuest 207595769.
- Spilde, Mary (February 2010). "Let Our Story Be Known". Community College Journal. 80 (4): 6. ProQuest 207592635.
- Spilde, Mary (April 2010). "This Is Our Time" (PDF). Community College Journal. 80 (5): 6.
- Spilde, Mary (June 2012). "A Year to Be Proud Of" (PDF). Community College Journal. 80 (8): 6.

== Awards and honors ==
In 2011, the Association of Community College Trustees presented her the Mary Y. Martin Chief Executive Officer of the Year Award for "demonstrating innovation in school programs, published works on post-secondary educational concepts and for special committees she has served on, all of which contribute to making her a national authority on community colleges, workforce development and sustainability".

Spilde was presented with the 2012 Mildred Bulpitt Woman of the Year Award of the American Association for Women in Community Colleges for "outstanding leadership and mentorship in providing opportunities for women in community colleges". She was also awarded the 2012 First Citizen Award of the Eugene Chamber of Commerce "for her work in catalyzing downtown revitalization".

The U.S. Green Building Council honored Spilde as "an Oregon green building leader" with the 2013 Leadership Award. The National Council for Continuing Education and Training awarded her the 2013 National Leadership Award.

In 2014, Spilde received the City of Eugene Human Rights Commission Martin Luther King Jr. Community Leadership Award, the Mattie Reynolds MLK award, and the Connected Lane County Vision Award.

The Council for Advancement and Support of Education honored her as the 2017 District VIII Leadership Award Recipient.

The college named the new downtown campus the Mary Spilde Center in 2017. Spilde's mother told her, "Mary, that's really good that your name will be on something else other than your gravestone."

Honoring her in 2017 with the title president emerita, the Lane Board of Trustees cited her "extraordinary achievements on behalf of the college; her record as the longest-serving president in college history; her leadership in the inter-agency partnership that financed the downtown campus; her successful efforts to raise the profile of the college in the community and nationally; and her unsurpassed energy in supporting a major gifts fundraising campaign that will benefit the college for generations to come".
