= First Thursday =

Recurring event in Portland, Oregon

First Thursday is a recurring event in the Pearl District of Portland, Oregon, United States. The event was established in 1986. It has been described as a monthly art gallery walk and outdoor street festival. It is organized by the Urban Art Network. Arts leader William Jamison has been credited as a co-founder. The event also has live music and food vendors.

Portland Monthly ranked the event number 49 in a 2025 "quintessential Portland bucket list" of 50 things to do in the city.

== See also ==
- Culture of Portland, Oregon
- Last Thursday on Alberta
- Mississippi Street Fair
