= Last Thursday on Alberta =

Recurring street festival in Portland, Oregon, U.S.

- Status: Active
- Genre: Festival
- Date: Last Thursday of each month
- Frequency: Monthly
- Venue: NE Alberta Street
- Location: Portland, Oregon
- Country: United States
- Attendance: 8,000
- Major events: Artists; drum circles; fire dancers; other entertainers; vendors
- Sponsors: Friends of Last Thursday; Portland Bureau of Transportation
- Website: lastthursdayalberta.org

Last Thursday on Alberta is a recurring street festival in Portland, Oregon, United States. The event has been held in northeast Portland for more than two decades. It is supported by Friends of Last Thursday and the Portland Bureau of Transportation. It was not funded by the city, as of 2010. The festival features artists, drum circles, fire dancers, and other entertainers, as well as vendors. As many as 8,000 people attend.

== History ==
The event has been criticized for being too large.

Last Thursday's future came into question in 2013. The event was paused during the COVID-19 pandemic.

== See also ==
- Culture of Portland, Oregon
- First Thursday, Pearl District
- Mississippi Street Fair
