= Northwestern Electric Company – Alberta Substation =

Historic building in Portland, Oregon, U.S.

- Northwestern Electric Company--Alberta Substation
- U.S. National Register of Historic Places
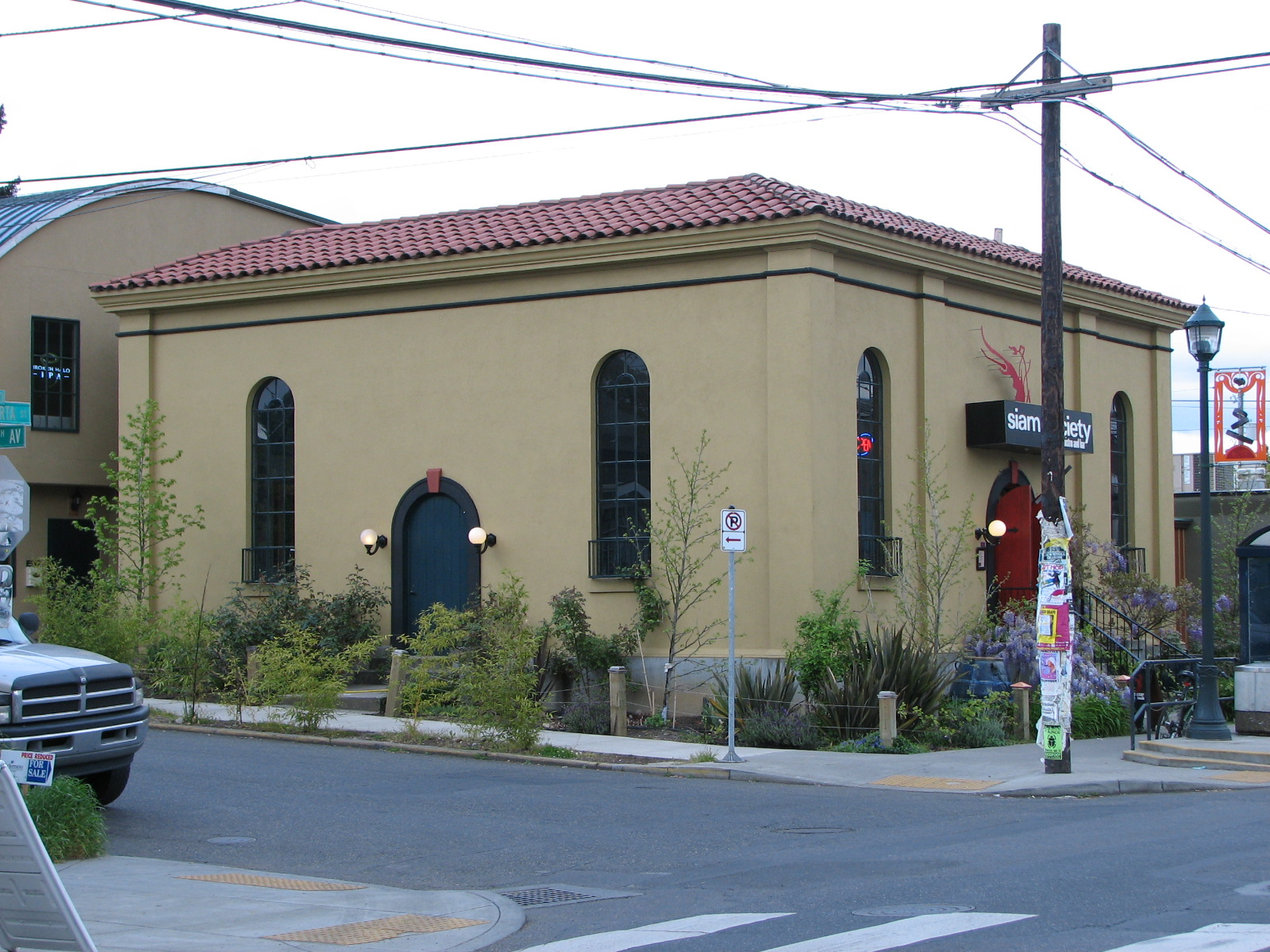
- The building's exterior in 2008

- Location within Portland, Oregon Location within Oregon Location within the United States
- Location: 2701-2717 NE Alberta St., Portland, Oregon
- Coordinates: 45°33′33″N 122°38′11″W
- Area: less than one acre
- Built: 1931
- Built by: Hansen Construction Company
- Architect: Harry Hills
- Architectural style: Late 19th And 20th Century Revivals, Mediterranean revival
- NRHP reference No.: 98000207
- Added to NRHP: March 5, 1998

The Northwestern Electric Company – Alberta Substation, or simply Alberta Substation, is an historic building on the National Register of Historic Places in northeast Portland, Oregon's Concordia neighborhood, United States. The building houses Bar Cala, as of 2022.

== See also ==
- National Register of Historic Places listings in Northeast Portland, Oregon
