= Blanchet House =

Non-profit social services organization in Portland, Oregon

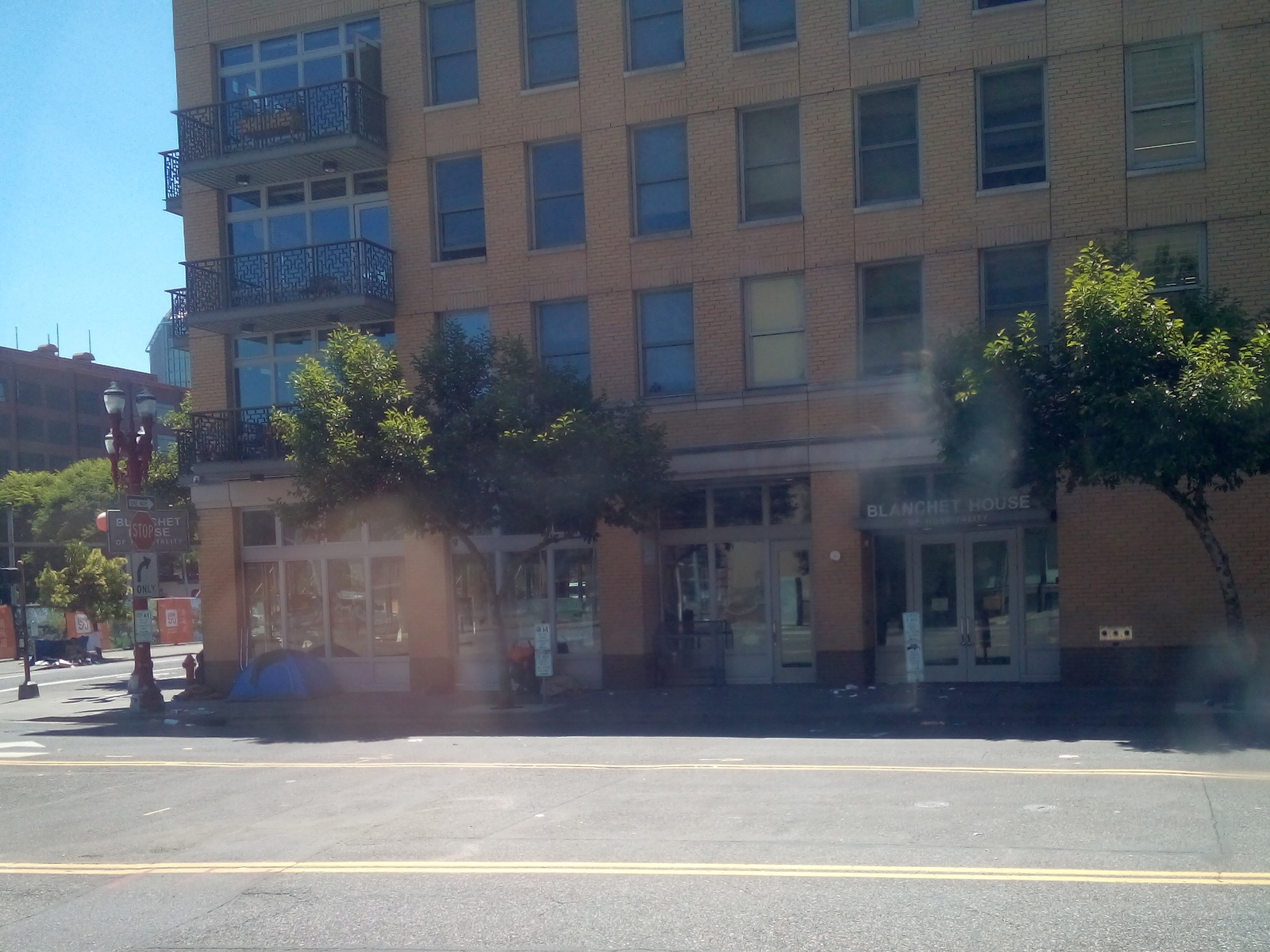
- The exterior of Blanchet House of Hospitality in May 2025
- Formation: 1952
- Type: 501(c)(3)
- Headquarters: 310 NW Glisan St
- Location: Portland, Oregon, U.S.
- Executive director: Steve Cook
- Website: blanchethouse.org

Blanchet House is a non-profit homeless services organization in Portland, Oregon. The organization was founded in 1952, and operates a meal service, transitional shelter, transitional housing with drug and alcohol recovery programs, and support services to those struggling with homelessness and addiction.

== History ==
In 1952, a group of University of Portland students rented the ground-level floor of the former New Meyer Hotel in Old Town Portland to use as a soup kitchen. The hotel was previously managed by S. Yamaguchi until 1931, when it was sold and became the Hotel New Meyer. At the time, the upper floors were used as a brothel. On Feb. 11, 1952, the group served its first meal to 227 people. The organization bought the building in 1958. By 2018, Blanchet House had been serving three meals a day, six days a week, to an average of 1,000 people a day. It is a house of hospitality, inspired by the Catholic Worker’s Movement.

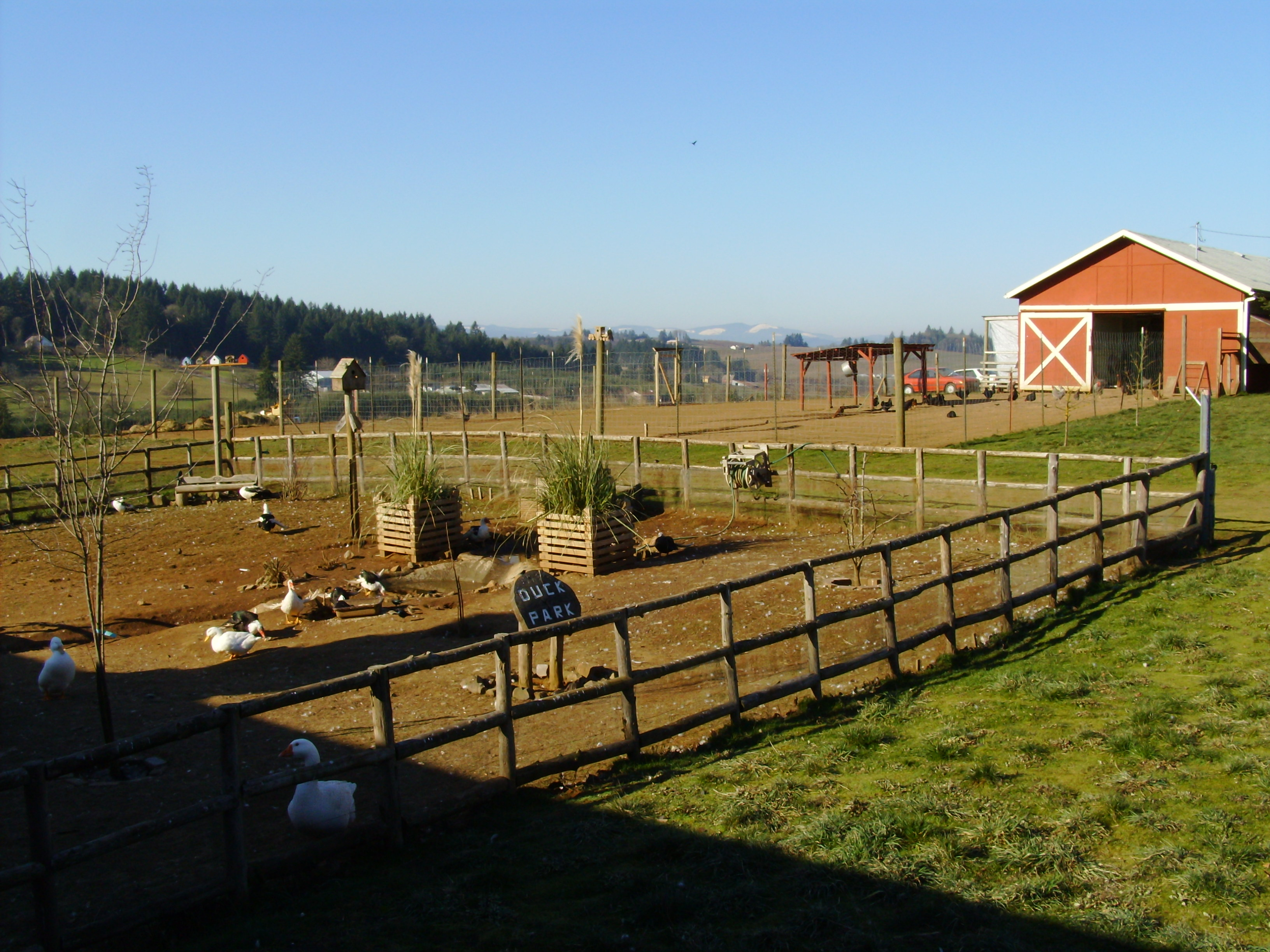
Blanchet work farm in 2008

In 1962, a farm in Carlton, Oregon was purchased by Blanchet House which hosts a residential program for men with drug and/or alcohol addiction. Blanchet Farm in Carlton, Yamhill County, Oregon runs a rural program offers a recovery through work. Participants engage in work such as caring for animals and gardens, along with learning woodworking and beekeeping.

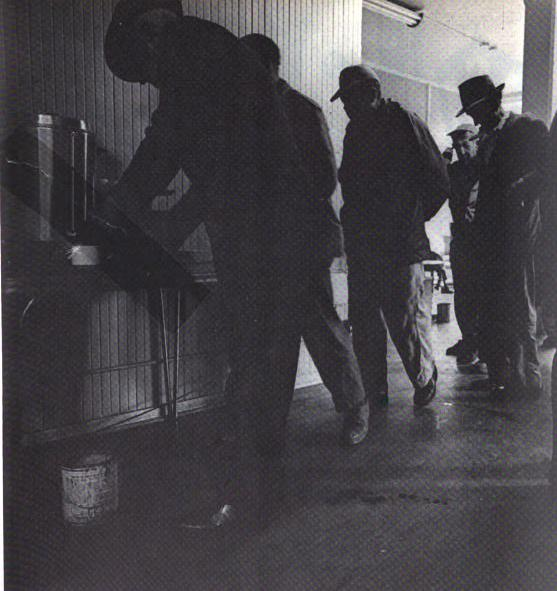
Late 1960s inside Blanchet House

Blanchet House operated from the same building until 2012 before moving to a newly constructed building right next door at the former site of a gay bar Dirty Duck. The organization acquired the location in which Dirty Duck was located with a land trade deal with Portland Development Commission. The new building is larger and the upper floors are used as transitional housing. The demolition of Dirty Duck to make ways for Blanchet House marks the only demolition of a National Register of Historic Place in the history of Portland. Blanchet House demolished its old location, the historic Yamaguchi Hotel on March 21, 2023 despite opposition from Restore Oregon. It was reported in 2023 that the organization plans on building a health clinic on the site of their old building.

Blanchet House's current building cost $12.9 million to build and $4 million of this came from the City of Portland through its Portland Housing Bureau. The funding deal came with the requirement that the construction project gave opportunity to contractors owned by women and minorities. An $88,000 contract for work on Blanchet House was awarded to a company called Elkins Masonry Restoration Inc. which listed the owner Nichole Elkins as a member of the Confederated Tribes of the Grand Ronde. The City of Portland paid for this work. It was discovered during an investigation the City Ombudsman's Office and Oregon Department of Justice that despite the owner's claim that the company was independent from other companies, the company made use of equipment owned by her white male husband's company D&R Masonry Restoration Inc. free of charge. Additionally, estimating for the Blanchet House project was done by one of her husband's company's employee. The state law requires that a company qualifying under minority business enterprise "must not be dependent upon any non-disadvantaged, non-minority or non-woman-owned firm." Elkins Masonry reached a settlement with the Department of Justice requiring them to surrender their minoirty/women owned business certificate and pay $15,000.

In December 2025, former executive director Scott Kerman resigned. Steve Cook, who has been an interim co-director became the executive director in May 2026.

== Services ==
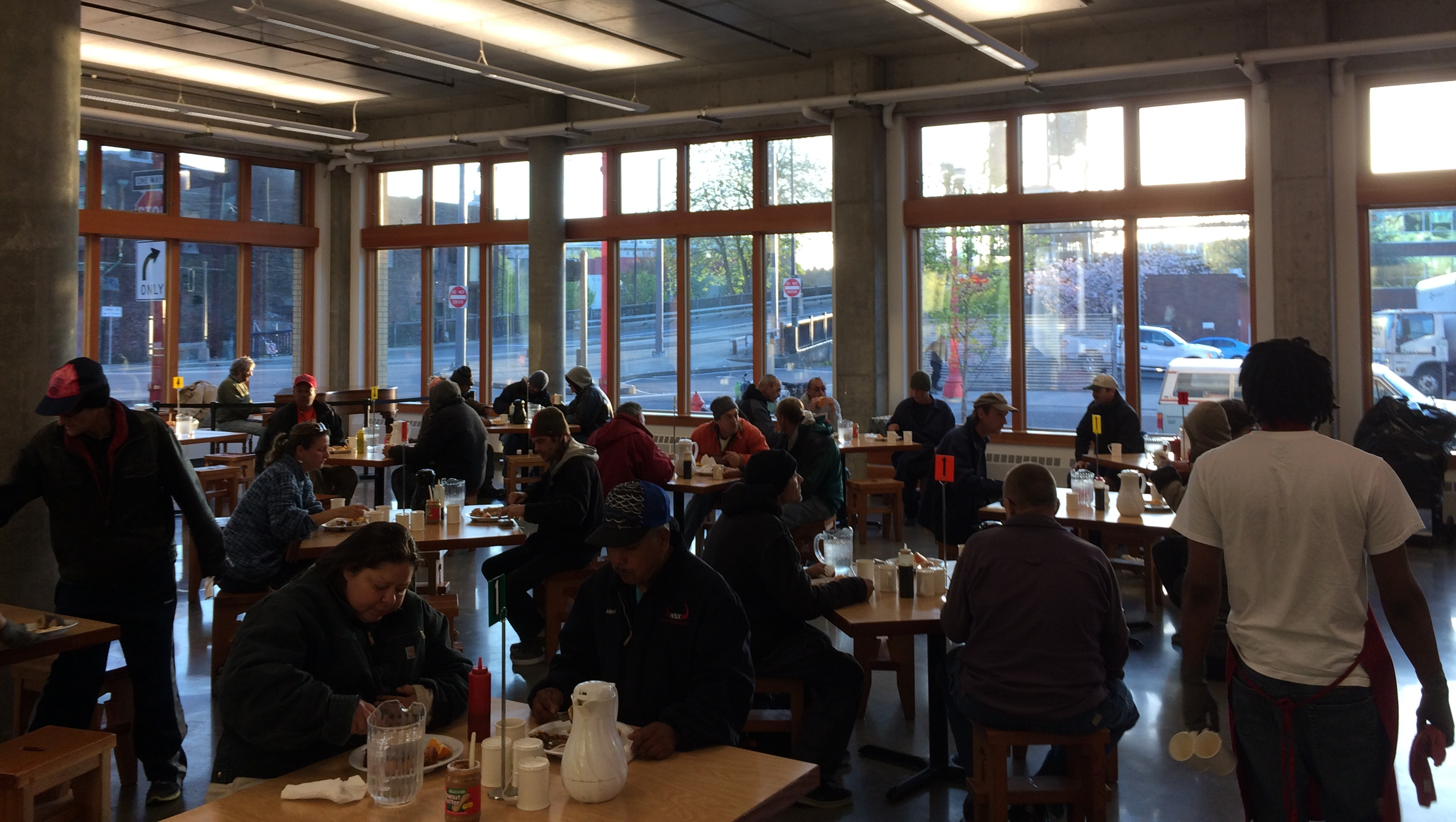
Blanchet House public cafeteria

Blanchet House serves three meals a day to anyone in need, Monday through Saturday, with capacity to serve 1,500 meals a day. Multnomah County had expended $431,000 to fund Blanchet's "day service". Multnomah County announced in February 2025 about its proposed to stop funding Blanchet's day programs. Executive director expressed dissatisfaction about the cut.

Blanchet House opened a 75-bed overnight homeless shelter for women in Slabtown part of Northwest Portland in February 2026. The women's shelter was originally proposed at St. Stephen's Episcopal Church in downtown. Some nearby neighbors raised concerns about tents and RVs appearing near the shelter to engage in activities not allowed at shelter, such as drugs, sex and alcohol based on their experience with activities that occurred around warning shelters operated by Multnomah County. A community meeting was held and residents voiced concerns about vagueness of the plan, trash, tents and drug use.
