= Northwest Portland, Oregon =

Sextant in Portland, Oregon, U.S.

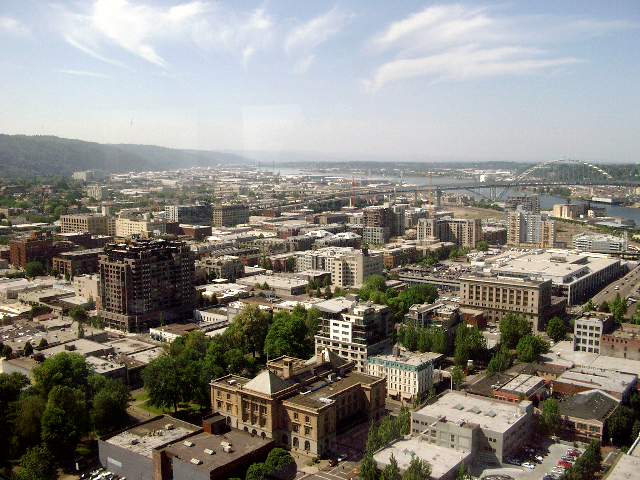
Pearl District

Northwest Portland is one of the sextants of Portland, Oregon, United States.

Northwest Portland includes the Pearl District, most of Old Town Chinatown, the Northwest District, and various residential and industrial neighborhoods. A range of streets primarily in Northwest Portland are named alphabetically from Ankeny through York (the street following York is Reed Street). The street between Wilson and York was called "X Street" until it was renamed as Roosevelt Street. Burnside Street, the "B" in the sequence, divides the Northeast and Northwest quadrants of the city from the Southeast and Southwest.

The Pearl District is a recent name for a former warehouse and industrial area just north of downtown. Many of the warehouses have been converted into lofts, and new multistory condominiums have also been developed on previously vacant land. The increasing density has attracted a mix of restaurants, brewpubs, shops, and art galleries. The galleries sponsor simultaneous artists' receptions every month, in an event known as First Thursday.

Between the Pearl District and the Willamette River is the Old Town Chinatown neighborhood. It includes Portland's Chinatown, marked by a pair of lions at its entrance at NW 4th Avenue and West Burnside Street and home to the Lan Su Chinese Garden. Before World War II, this area was known as Japan Town; Chinatown was previously located just south of West Burnside Street along the riverfront.

Farther west is the compact but thriving Northwest 21st and 23rd Avenue restaurant and retail area, the core of the Northwest District. Parts of this area are also called Uptown and Nob Hill. Nicknames include Snob Hill and Trendy Third. The residential areas adjacent to the shopping district include the Alphabet Historic District (with large Victorian and Craftsman homes built in the years before and shortly after 1900) and a large district centered on Wallace Park. The neighborhood has a mix of Victorian era houses, apartment buildings from throughout the 20th century, and various businesses centered on Legacy Good Samaritan Medical Center. The Portland Streetcar connects Nob Hill to downtown, through the Pearl.

West of the developed areas is the northern portion of Portland's West Hills, including the majority of extensive Forest Park and the Willamette Heights, Hillside, Sylvan, Skyline and Forest Heights neighborhoods.

== See also ==
- National Register of Historic Places listings in Northwest Portland, Oregon
- Neighborhoods of Portland, Oregon
