= Eugene Public Library =

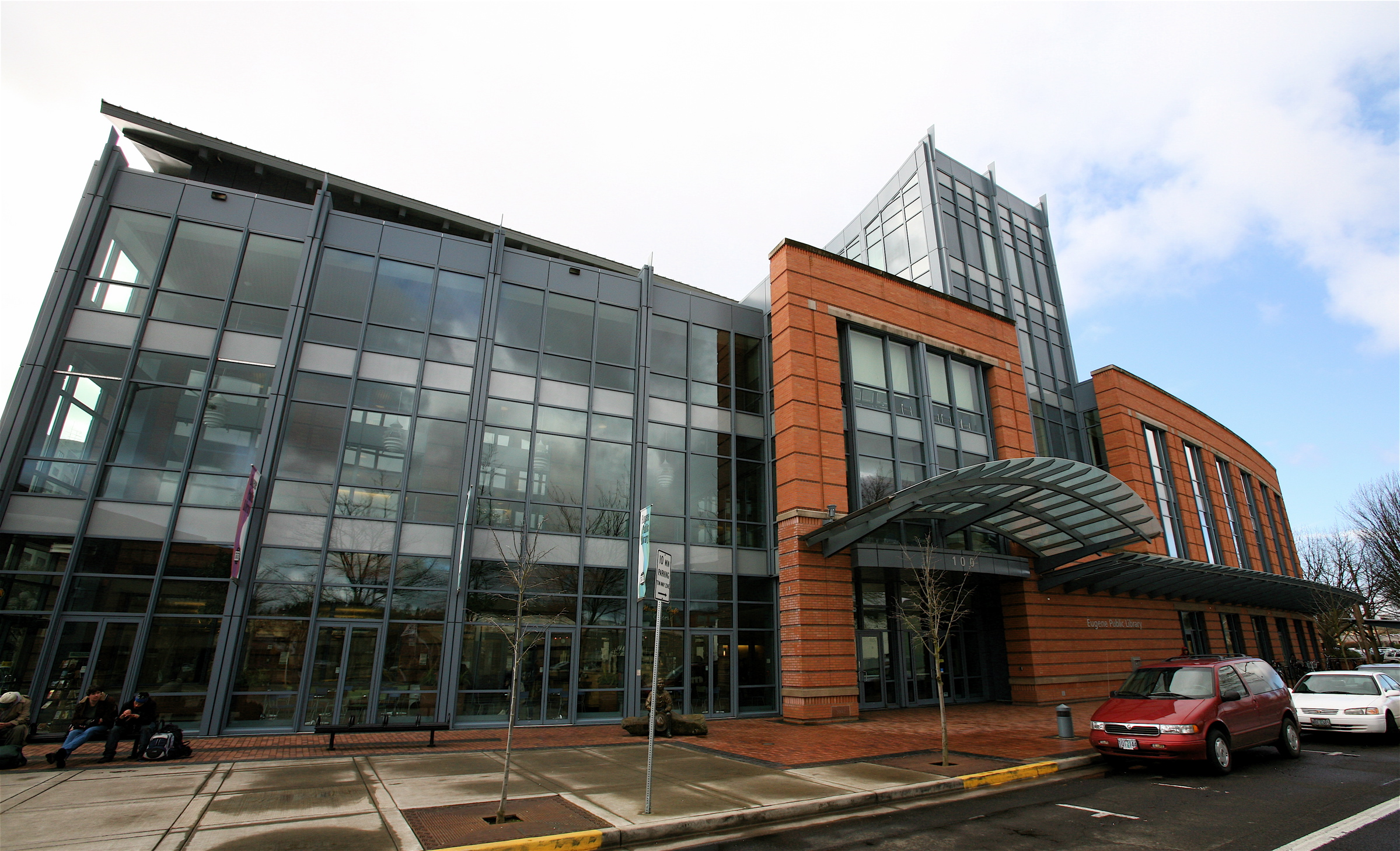
- 44°2′55.794″N 123°5′39.367″W
- Location: 100 W. 10th Ave. Eugene, OR 97401, United States
- Established: 1898
- Branches: 3 (Downtown, Bethel, Sheldon)

Collection
- Items collected: Books, CDs, DVDs, magazines, audio books; streaming/download ebooks, audiobooks, music, movies
- Size: 1,850,279

Access and use
- Population served: 176,654 (Eugene)

Other information
- Website: Official website

The Eugene Public Library is a municipal public library in Eugene, Oregon, United States. It has been in four different buildings since 1898. The library has a total of three branches: Downtown, Bethel, and Sheldon.

== History ==
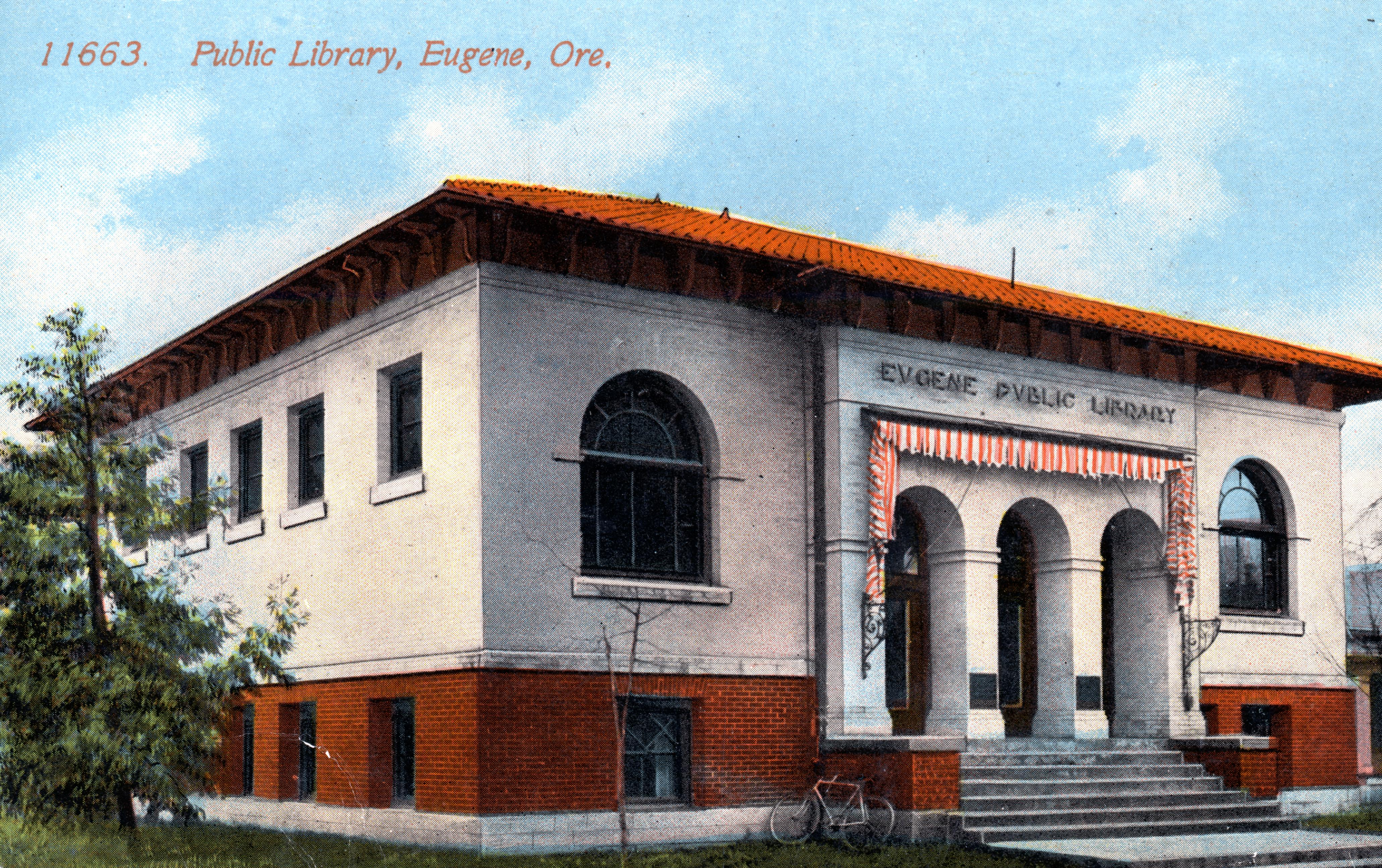
The institution, a Carnegie library, circa 1910

In 1898, a group of women founded the Fortnightly Club and opened a private reading room in a store building in downtown Eugene. Eugene Public Library was established as a tax-supported entity in 1904. In 1906, Oregon's first Carnegie Library was established on the corner of Willamette Street and East 11th Avenue. In 1959, a new library building opened at the corner of West 13th Avenue and Olive Street. This remained the main library building until it was moved to its current location at West 10th Avenue and Charnelton Street in 2002. At this time, the library already had two branches—Bethel (West Eugene) and Sheldon (Cal Young neighborhood)—that had opened in 2000.

In 2003 the new library building won first place in the American Institute of Architects of Southwest Oregon's public architecture awards. The library received a $1.1 million bequest in 2009 from the estate of Frederick "Doc" Rankin, a Eugene doctor and property owner who died in 2004.

== Current building ==
The library's latest building and its underground parking garage have been described as "energy efficient, low maintenance, and filled with daylight." The new building is four times larger than the older one.

The number of users of the library approximately tripled after the new building opened, and then further increased following the economic downturn of 2008. A total of 834,640 people entered the library in fiscal year (FY) 2024, up from 826,982 people the previous year. The total size of the system's collections was 1,850,279 in FY24, including over 400,000 physical items. As of March 28, 2026, a total of 137,518 people hold library cards within the Eugene Library system.
