= Sue Shaffer =

American activist

Sue Shaffer (1922–2017) was an American activist.

== Career ==
Shaffer was born in 1922.

In 1983, she assumed the role of Board Chair and led the Cow Creek Tribe towards increased recognition, achieving Congressional recognition of the Cow Creek Band of Umpqua Tribe of Indians. She obtained a federal loan for a bingo parlor in Canyonville, Oregon which later evolved into a significant casino and hotel resort.

Under her guidance until 2010, the Cow Creek Tribe expanded the resort and diversified their ventures.

Shaffer also served as the board chair at Umpqua Community College, becoming its first female chair.

Shaffer received the 1999 President's Award from the Roseburg Area Chamber of Commerce and represented several national organizations, including the National Congress of American Indians, the Affiliated Tribes of Northwest Indians, and the Indian Women's Leadership White House Conference.

== Death ==
In April 2017, she died at the age of 94.
