= Oregon Commission for Women =

Oregon agency addressing economic, social, legal, and political equality for women

In 1964 Governor Mark Hatfield established the Governor’s Commission on the Status of Women to advise him of the needs and concerns of women in Oregon. In 1983, Governor Victor Atiyeh gave the Commission independent agency status with a directive to continue its mission and the Legislature created the Oregon Commission for Women to work for the implementation and establishment of economic, legal, political, and social equality of women, and to continually assess the needs and issues of women and girls. The commission's mission is as follows: “The mission of the Oregon Commission for Women is to work for the implementation and establishment of economic, social, legal, and political equality for women and to maintain a continuing assessment of the issues and needs confronting women in Oregon.” The agency is overseen by an 11-member board of directors who are actively involved in policy setting and attending to the growth of the Commission.

Since 1985 the Oregon Commission for Women has recognized and honored 77 women who, through their works and lives, have significantly improved the lives of women in Oregon. The Oregon Women of Achievement award demonstrates our state's appreciation for her endeavors and recognizes her accomplishments across Oregon. Past members of the commission include Marian Milligan and Eleanor R. Davis.
