= Eb & Bean =

Chain of frozen yogurt shops in Portland, Oregon, U.S.

- Exterior of the original shop on Broadway in Northeast Portland's Irvington neighborhood, 2025

Restaurant information
- Established: 2014
- Owner: Elizabeth Nathan
- Location: Portland, Multnomah, Oregon, United States
- Website: ebandbean.com

Eb & Bean is a chain of vegan-friendly frozen yogurt shops in Portland, Oregon, United States. The business was established by Elizabeth Nathan in 2014. The original location opened on Broadway in Northeast Portland's Irvington neighborhood. Subsequent locations were opened on Division Street in Southeast Portland's Richmond neighborhood in 2016 and on 21st Avenue in Northwest Portland's Northwest District in 2019.

== Description ==
Eb & Bean is a vegan-friendly chain of frozen yogurt shops in Portland, Oregon. Eater has described the business as "hyper-local".

The original shop operates on Broadway in Northeast Portland's Irvington neighborhood. The "spacious" location on Division Street in Southeast Portland's Richmond neighborhood has a seating capacity of 26 people and has shared a patio with the Indian restaurant Bollywood Theater. The shop on 21st Avenue in Northwest Portland's Northwest District has a colorful interior, with murals of polar bears.

According to Willamette Week, the business "buys its milk at family-run organic dairy farms within 100 miles of Portland and uses no hormones, no artificial sweeteners and, unlike other 'farm to cone' places, no corn syrup".

=== Menu ===
The menu includes almond-, coconut-, and oat milk-based varieties; flavors have included apple pie, cinnamon roll, almond coconut, chocolate, chocolate hazelnut pudding, guava lime coconut, hazelnut praline, boysenberry, marionberry, marionberry pancake, muscovado blondie, sour cherry watermelon, tart, vanilla, and vanilla-roasted macadamia.

Toppings have included cold brew bourbon sauce, caramelized peanut butter, candied ginger, chocolate sprinkles, coconut whipped cream, vegan marshmallows, gummy bears, hot fudge sauce, roasted hazelnuts, toffee, granola, orange cardamom caramel corn, and salted caramel sauce.

Eb & Bean has also served cookie sandwiches, sundaes, waffle cones, and hot chocolate. The business does not use artificial ingredients.

== History ==
=== Original location ===
Elizabeth Nathan opened the first location on Broadway in mid 2014. Benjamin Tepler of Portland Monthly said she "changed the game" for frozen yogurt in the city, writing: "Next-level ice cream was already a thing, but it wasn't until Eb & Bean was born that frozen yogurt went from a 'pay-by-the-pound' mall pit stop to artisan status: everything made from scratch, in house, or from the city's top crafters, with oodles of options for the dairy and gluten-adverse." Willamette Week has said the business targeted "a health-conscious demographic and locavores" in 2014.

For Valentine's Day in 2015, the shop offered a special "Lady Gray" variety infused with assam, bergamot, lavender, lemon myrtle, and orange peel, topped with caramel sauce from Bakeshop. A vehicle was driven into the shop in 2024; there was damage but no injuries.

=== Subsequent locations ===
Exteriors of the shops on Division Street in Southeast Portland's Richmond neighborhood (top) and on 21st Avenue in Northwest Portland's Northwest District (bottom), 2025

In August 2016, the business announced plans to open a second location on Division Street, in the D Street Village space that previously housed the restaurant Koi Fusion. Initially aiming for an October launch, the opening date was pushed back to November. Nathan had come up with approximately 100 flavor combinations by then. Little Nib, described as a "craft chocolate micro-shop", launched within the shop in 2017.

In December 2018, the business announced plans to open a third location on 21st Avenue in 2019. Like many restaurants Eb & Bean's operations were disrupted upon the arrival of the COVID-19 pandemic. The shops adjusted by operating via pick-up and take-out. In 2021, the business began accepting Kuto, described by The Oregonian as "an alternative payment app designed to save businesses money on credit card fees".

== Reception ==
Samantha Bakall of The Oregonian included Eb & Bean in a 2016 overview of Portland's best soft serve. The newspaper's Lizzy Acker included the chain's frozen yogurt and toppings in a 2019 list of seventeen of the "prettiest cold treats" in the Portland metropolitan area. In 2016, a writer for the Portland Mercury said, "rest assured the frozen yogurt you get from this hopping NE Broadway joint does not disappoint". In 2020, during the COVID-19 pandemic, the newspaper included Eb & Bean in an overview of Portland's best ice cream shops with delivery and take-out services.

Eb & Bean won in the Best Frozen Yogurt category of Willamette Week's annual 'Best of Portland' readers' poll in 2016 and 2017. In 2017, the newspaper's Martin Cizmar said the business was "the city's best fro-yo spot." Danielle Centoni included Eb & Bean in Bon Appétit's 2017 list of Portland's best healthy restaurants. Portland Monthly's Kelly Clarke called the coconut and nut milk variety "stellar" in 2017. The magazine also included Eb & Bean in a 2017 list of seventeen "standout vegan–approved restaurants" in the city . Pete Cottell included the business in Thrillist's 2019 list of Portland's "most essential spots for every kind of ice cream".

Anastasia Sloan included Eb & Bean in Eater Portland's 2025 overview of Portland's best dairy-free frozen desserts. In VegNews's 2026 overview of the nation's best dairy-free soft serve, Charlotte Pointing said the business "isn't entirely vegan, but it has paid special attention to dairy-free soft serve", recommending the blood salted caramel and coconut cream caramel varieties.

== See also ==
- List of restaurant chains in the United States
- List of vegetarian and vegan restaurants
