= Taste Tickler =

Sandwich shop in Portland, Oregon, U.S.

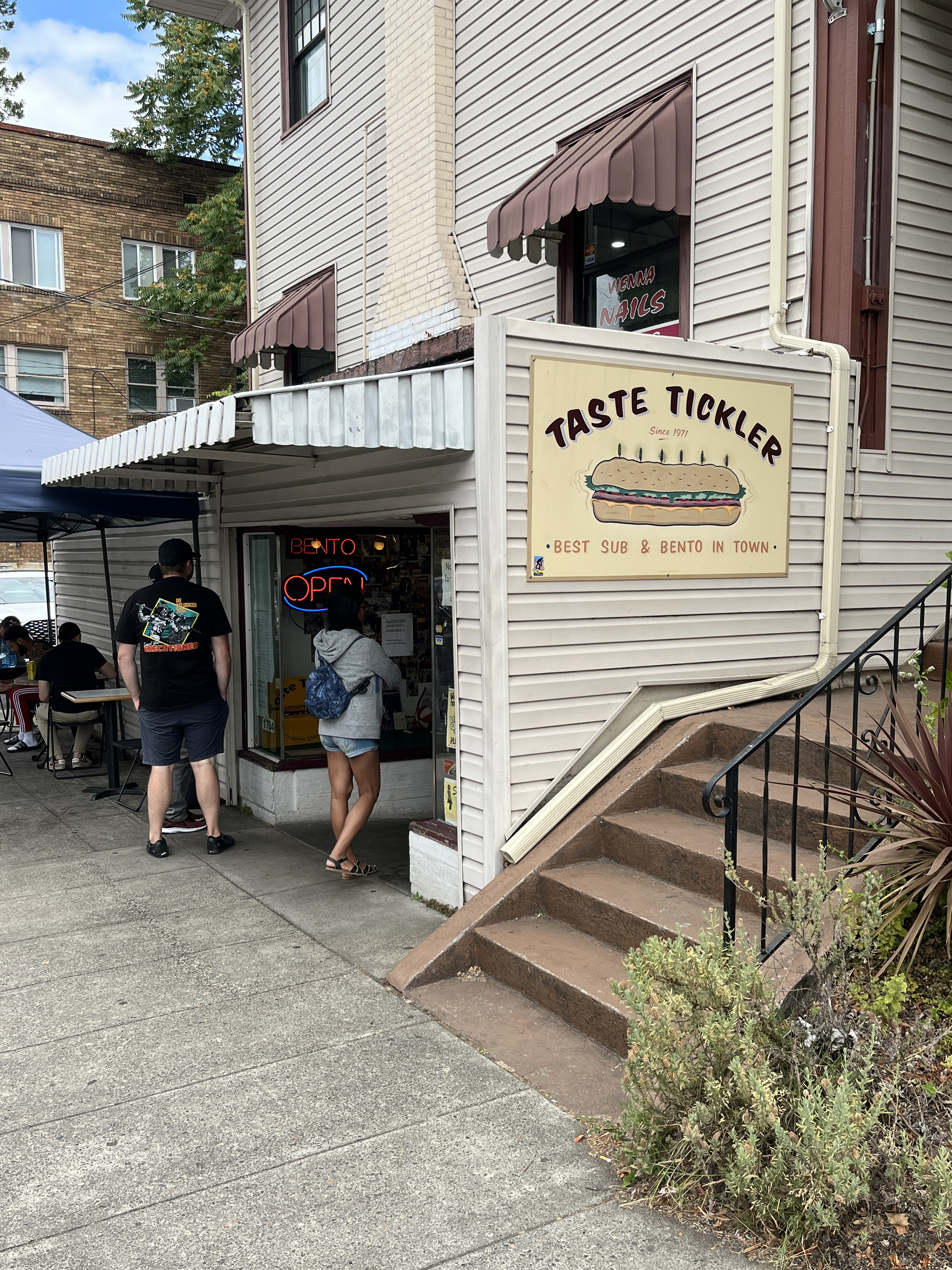
- The shop's exterior, 2022
- Interactive map of Taste Tickler

Restaurant information
- Established: 1971
- Owner: Andy Kim
- Location: 1704 Northeast 14th Avenue, Portland, Multnomah, Oregon, 97212, United States
- Coordinates: 45.5352°N 122.6514°W

Taste Tickler is a sandwich shop in Portland, Oregon. Established in 1971, the restaurant operates in a 1900s house in northeast Portland's Irvington neighborhood.

== Description ==
The "Korean-influenced" sandwich shop Taste Tickler operates in a 1900s house at the intersection of Broadway and 14th Avenue in northeast Portland's Irvington neighborhood. The interior has walls lined with photographs of customers.

Sandwich ingredients include lettuce, mayonnaise, onions, Parmesan, peperoncini, pickles, Provolone, and tomatoes. The Taste Tickler sandwich has ham, pepperoni, and salami. The shop also serves bento, potstickers and kimchi, a cheesesteak, as well as sandwiches with kimchi bulgogi beef, teriyaki chicken, and turkey and cranberry.

== History ==
Taste Tickler opened in 1971. Andy Kim is the owner.

== Reception ==
Taste Tickler won in the Best Sandwich Shop category of Willamette Week's annual 'Best of Portland' readers' poll in 2024 and 2025.
