= Steeplejack Brewing Company =

Brewery in the U.S. state of Oregon

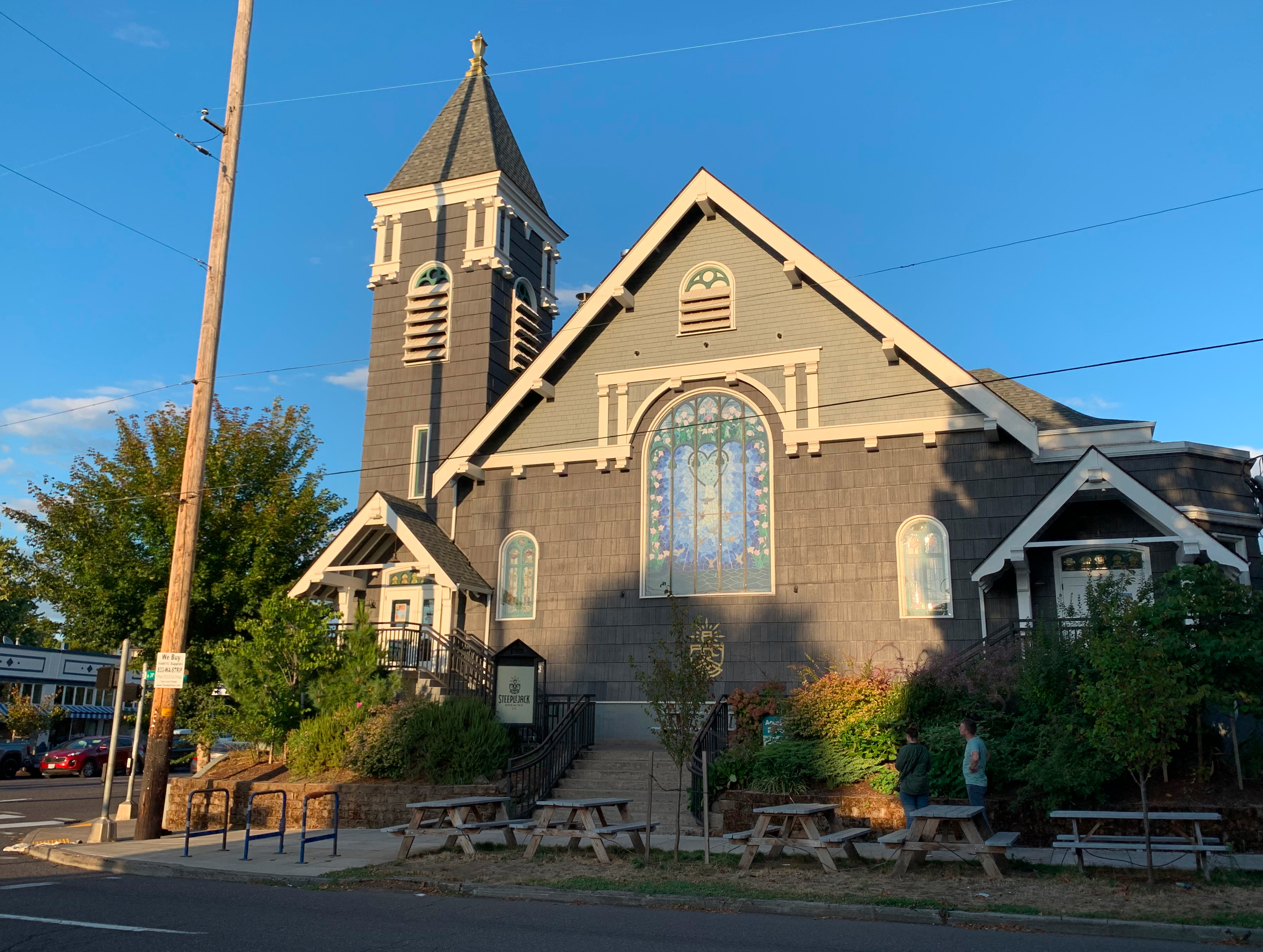
- Exterior of the restaurant in northeast Portland, Oregon, 2023
- Interactive map of Steeplejack Brewing Company

Restaurant information
- Location: Oregon, United States
- Coordinates: 45.5349°N 122.6408°W
- Website: steeplejackbeer.com

Steeplejack Brewing Company is a brewery with multiple locations in the U.S. state of Oregon. The business operates in Portland and Hillsboro, and has announced plans to expand to Manzanita.

== Description and history ==
Business partners Brody Day and Dustin Harder opened the original restaurant in 2021. Housed in the former Metropolitan Community Church in northeast Portland's Sullivan's Gulch neighborhood, the restaurant serves burgers and craft beer.

In 2022, a second location opened on Southwest Beaverton-Hillsdale Highway. The restaurant has a seating capacity of approximately 200 people, and serves pizza and salads, as well as arancini and polenta as sides.

A third location in Hillsboro was announced in 2021, and began operating in 2022. In 2022, owners announced plans to open a fourth location in Manzanita.

Anna Buxton was Steepejack's brewmaster, as of 2022.

In February 2025, Steeplejack began operating in a former bank building on Hawthorne Boulevard in southeast Portland's Sunnyside neighborhood. The site also has a coffee shop by Harder Day, a food cart pod, and a patio. Opening businesses in the pod include Ali's Hot Chicken and Smash Burgers, Gyro World PDX, Mama Chow's Kitchen, Shera Indian Food, and Tacos Fita

== Reception ==
Steeplejack was named Best New Brewery at the 2022 Oregon Beer Awards. In 2023, Buxton was one of 18 Portland industry professionals deemed "rising stars" by the restaurant resource and trade publication StarChefs.

Katherine Chew Hamilton and Brooke Jackson-Glidden included Steeplejack in Eater Portland's 2025 list of the city's best restaurants and food cart pods for large groups.

== See also ==
- Brewing in Oregon
- List of restaurant chains in the United States
