= Thompson Court Apartments =

- U.S. National Register of Historic Places
- U.S. Historic district – Contributing property
- Portland Historic Landmark
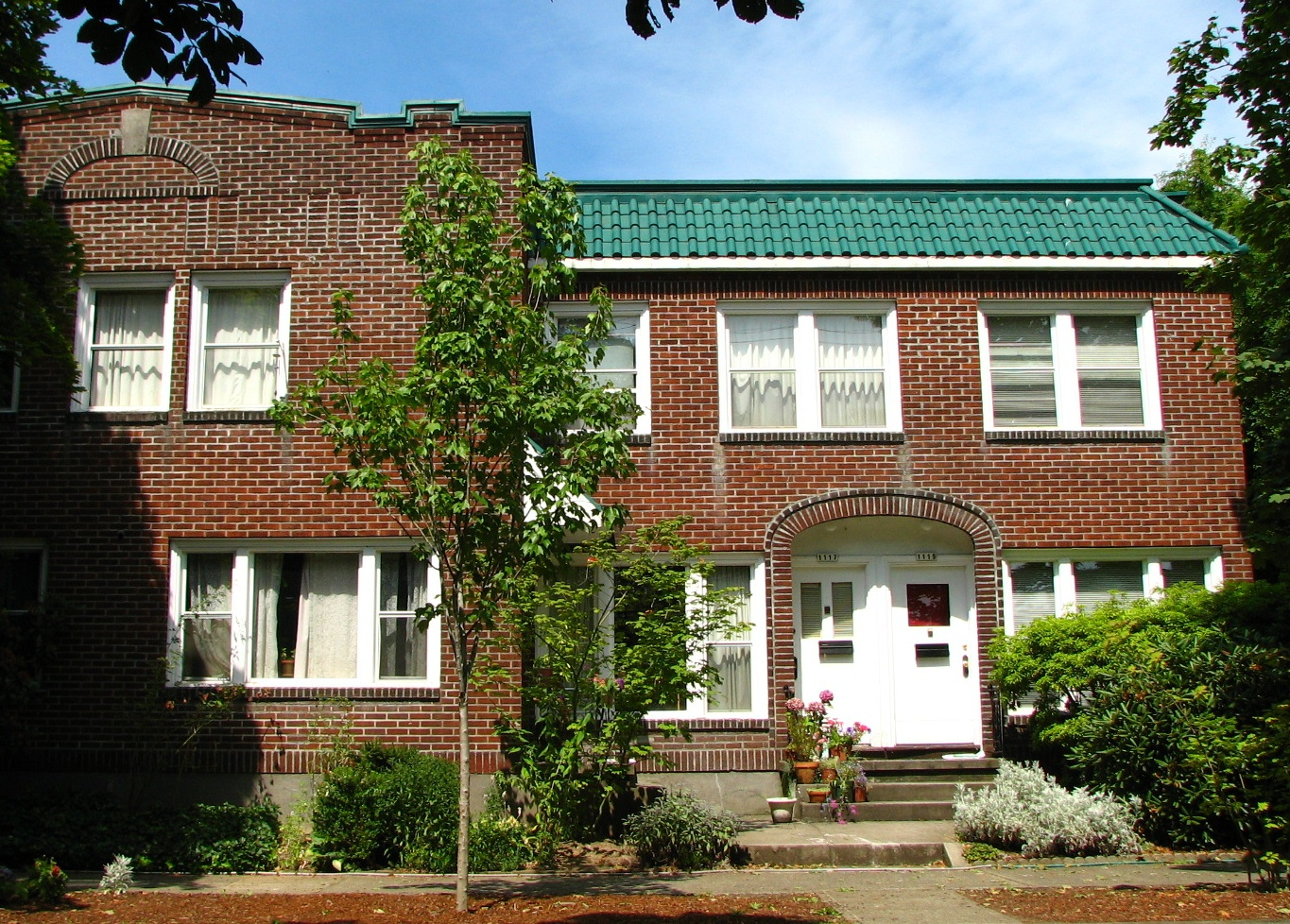
- The building in 2008

- Location within the United States Location within Oregon Location within Portland, Oregon
- Location: 2304–2314 NE 11th Avenue; Portland, Oregon
- Coordinates: 45°32′21″N 122°39′15″W
- Built: 1929
- Architect: Ewald T. Pape
- Architectural style: Modern
- Part of: Irvington Historic District (ID10000850)
- MPS: Middle Class Apartments in East Portland MPS
- NRHP reference No.: 97000121
- Added to NRHP: February 21, 1997

The Thompson Court Apartments are a historic apartment building located in Portland, Oregon, United States. They represent an excellent example of architect Ewald T. Pape's steps toward making apartment living more appealing to the middle class. Built in 1929 for developer William K. Johnson, the building incorporates features such as two-story townhouse-type units, an L shape footprint to create greenspace, individual front and back entrances to each unit with individual addresses, and an overall emphasis on interior function over exterior design. While Pape was not unique in the use of these features, he stands out for utilizing all of them as a cohesive whole in his best buildings.

The building was entered on the National Register of Historic Places in 1996.

== See also ==
- National Register of Historic Places listings in Northeast Portland, Oregon
- Burrell Heights Apartments
- San Farlando Apartments
