= Sabin, Portland, Oregon =

Sabin
- Neighborhood
- Location in Portland
- Coordinates: 45°33′03″N 122°38′58″W
- Country: United States
- State: Oregon
- City: Portland

Government
  - Association: Sabin Community Association
  - Coalition: Northeast Coalition of Neighborhoods

Area
  - Total: 0.37 sq mi (0.95 km^{2})

Population (2000)
  - Total: 3,192
  - Density: 8,700/sq mi (3,400/km^{2})

Housing
  - No. of households: 1299
  - Occupancy rate: 96% occupied
  - Owner-occupied: 931 households (72%)
  - Renting: 368 households (28%)
  - Avg. household size: 2.46 persons

Sabin is a neighborhood in the Northeast section of Portland, Oregon, United States. It is bordered by Vernon on the north, King on the west, Irvington on the south, Alameda on the east, and Concordia on the northeast.

== See also ==
- Acadia: A New Orleans Bistro
- Alameda Ridge
- Albina Library
