= Bakeshop (Portland, Oregon) =

Bakery in Portland, Oregon, U.S.

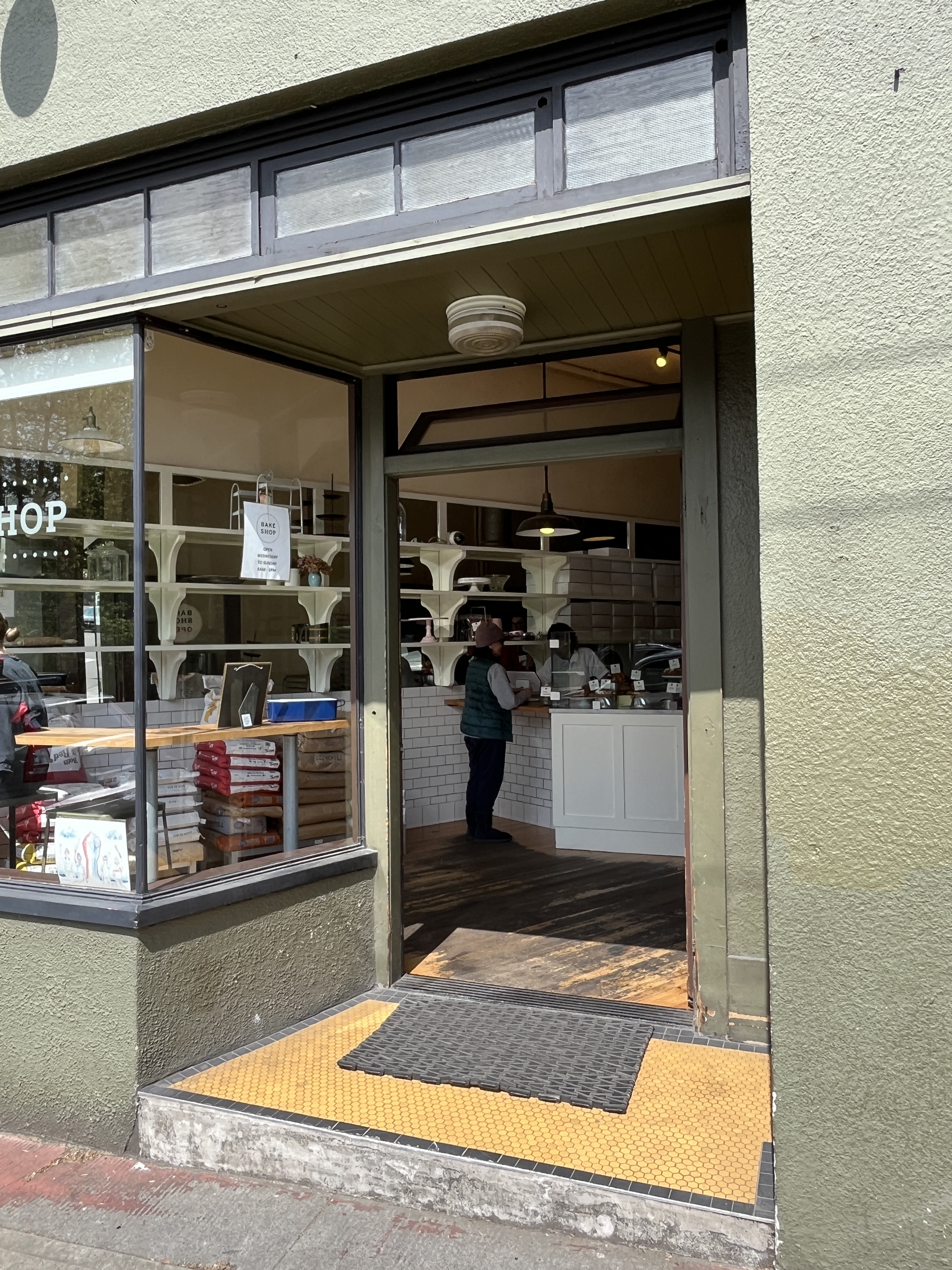
- The shop in 2025
- Interactive map of Bakeshop

Restaurant information
- Location: 5351 Northeast Sandy Boulevard, Portland, Multnomah, Oregon, 97213, United States
- Coordinates: 45°32′28″N 122°36′29″W

Bakeshop is a bakery in Portland, Oregon, United States. Kim Boyce is the owner. The business was included in Food & Wine's 2020 list of the best bakeries in the United States.

== Description ==
The bakery Bakeshop operates on Sandy Boulevard in northeast Portland's Rose City Park neighborhood. The menu includes Burnt Basque Cheesecake, cookies, pies, and pastries such as Figgy Scones, Strawberry Scones, and Whole Wheat Chocolate Chip Cookies. Bakeshop also serves lemon pound cake, muffins, scones, and teacake.

== History ==
The bakery opened in 2011. Bakeshop has served matzah for Passover.

== Reception ==
In 2020, Food & Wine named Bakeshop one of the nation's best bakeries. Michelle Lopez and Janey Wong included the business in Eater Portland's 2025 overview of the city's best bakeries.

== See also ==
- List of bakeries
