= Beaumont-Wilshire, Portland, Oregon =

Beaumont-Wilshire
- Neighborhood
- Interactive map of Beaumont-Wilshire
- Coordinates: 45°33′01″N 122°37′21″W
- Country: United States
- State: Oregon
- City: Portland

Government
  - Association: Beaumont-Wilshire Neighborhood Association
  - Coalition: Northeast Coalition of Neighborhoods

Area
  - Total: 0.74 sq mi (1.9 km^{2})

Population (2020)
  - Total: 6,080
  - Density: 8,216/sq mi (3,172/km^{2})

Housing
  - No. of households: 2457
  - Occupancy rate: 96.9% occupied
  - Owner-occupied: 1890 households (87%)
  - Renting: 278 households (13%)
  - Avg. household size: 2.5 persons

The Beaumont-Wilshire (/ˌboʊmɒnt ˈwɪlʃər/ BOH-mont WIL-shər) neighborhood of Portland, Oregon is located in the city's northeast section, on Alameda Ridge with views of Downtown, the Willamette River, and the Cascades. It is bordered by the Alameda, Concordia, Cully, Rose City Park, and Grant Park neighborhoods. "Beaumont Village", located on NE Fremont Street, from NE 42rd Ave. to NE 50th Ave., is the main commercial district in the neighborhood, but the neighborhood also lies within walking distance of the Hollywood District, a major commercial and shopping area to the south.

Beaumont-Wilshire is an older, well established neighborhood. It has a mixture of residential and commercial properties. The Beaumont-Wilshire neighborhood is in actuality two separate neighborhoods separated by NE Fremont Street, with Beaumont to the south and Wilshire to the north. The two neighborhoods agreed to form the Beaumont-Wilshire Neighborhood Association to recognize their common interests, including their common commercial center of Beaumont Village.

== History ==
The original Beaumont neighborhood was platted in 1910. It was originally part of the Rose City Park subdivision which was platted in 1907. The original Rose City Park subdivision was part of a land claim of Joseph Backenstos, which was assigned to his widow by President Andrew Johnson in 1866. Early maps, around 1890, refer to this area as the Crook Tract. The name Beaumont means "beautiful mountain" in French. The south slope of Alameda Ridge, originally known as "Beaumont Hill" or "Gravel Hill", trends northwest–southeast through the southern part of the neighborhood. The ridge has views of northeast Portland and the downtown skyline, as well as some of the most expensive homes in Portland. Reportedly, concrete sidewalks and curbs were poured south of NE Fremont in 1911, and the streets were paved within the following few years.

The Wilshire neighborhood was initially platted in 1921 around the area of NE 33rd and N.E. Skidmore. Wilshire includes Wilshire Park, a 14.83-acre (60,000 m^{2}) park with a canopy of mature trees, playgrounds, and picnic facilities. In 1928 the area between NE Fremont and Prescott, and from NE 42nd to 52nd was annexed into the city of Portland, and part of this annex later became the eastern part of the Wilshire neighborhood.

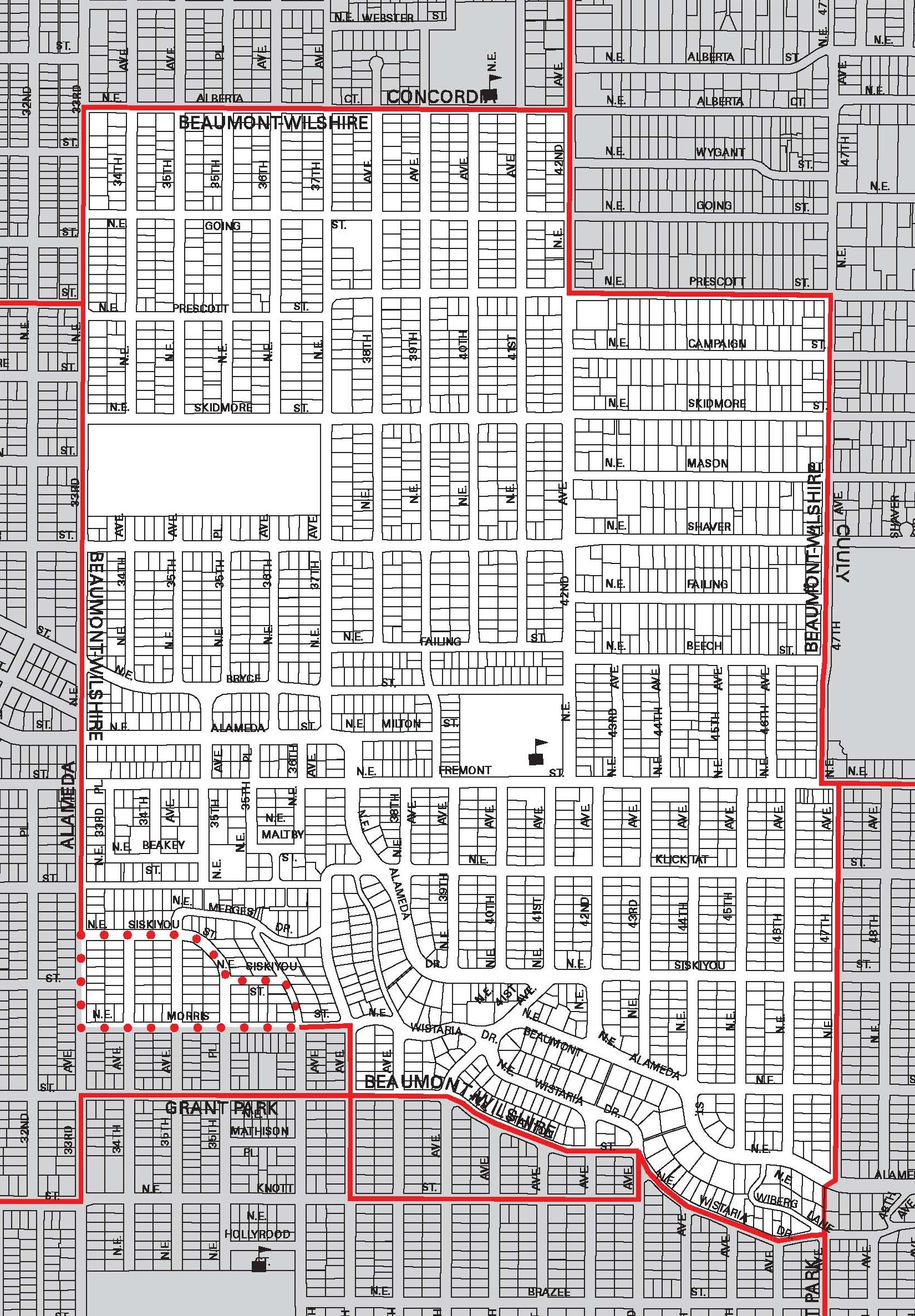
Beaumont-Wilshire Neighborhood Boundary

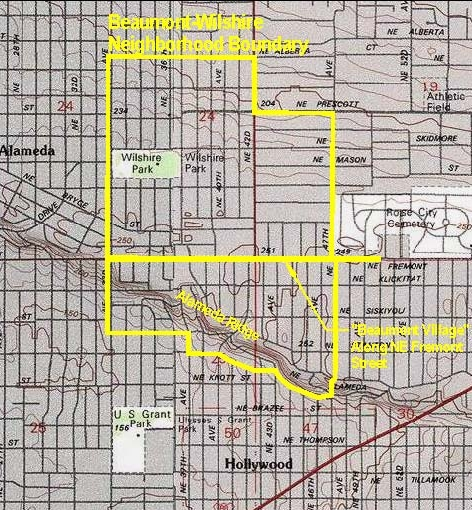
Beaumont-Wilshire Topographic Map

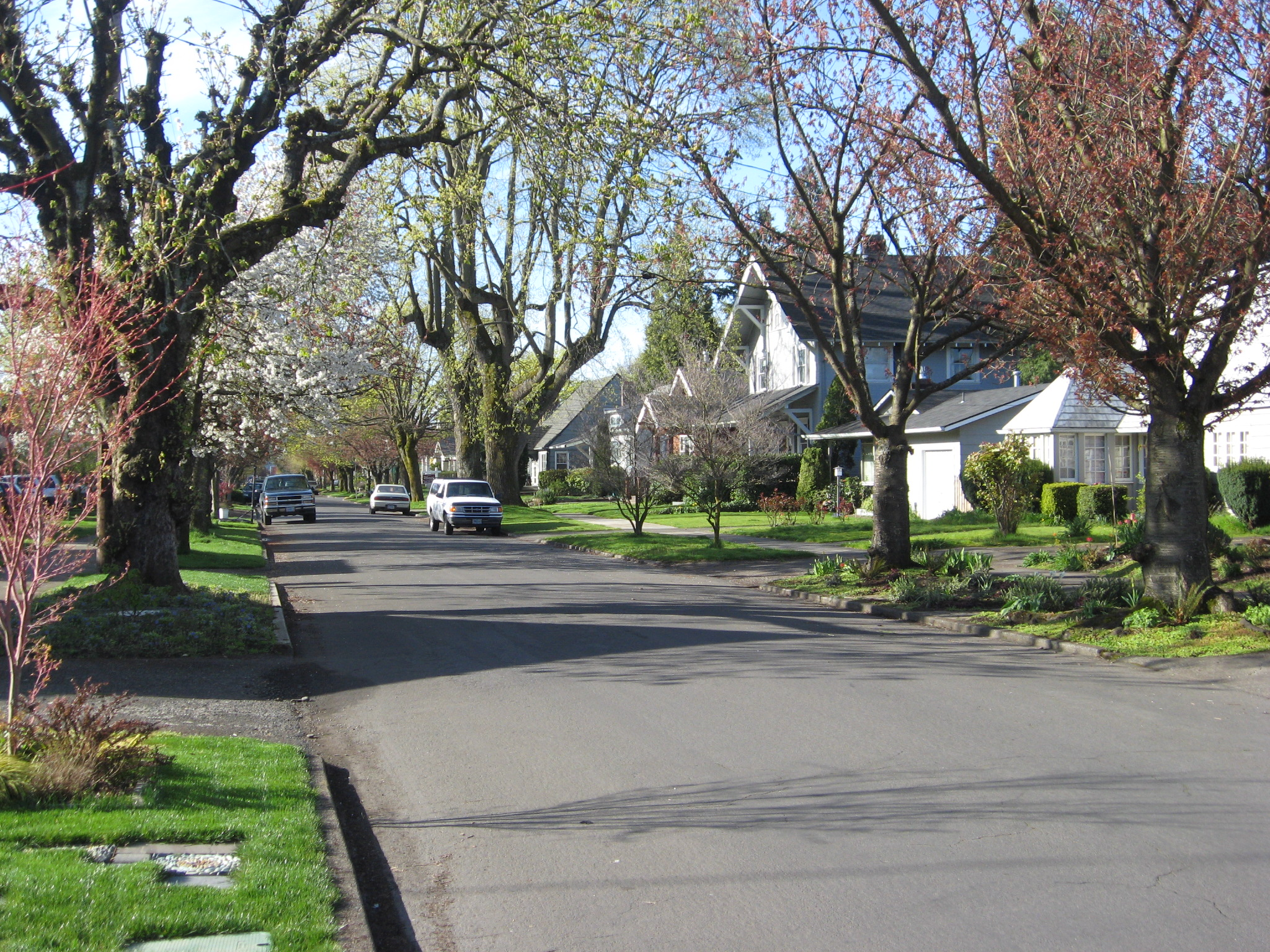
NE 46th Avenue Between Siskiyou St. and Stanton St.

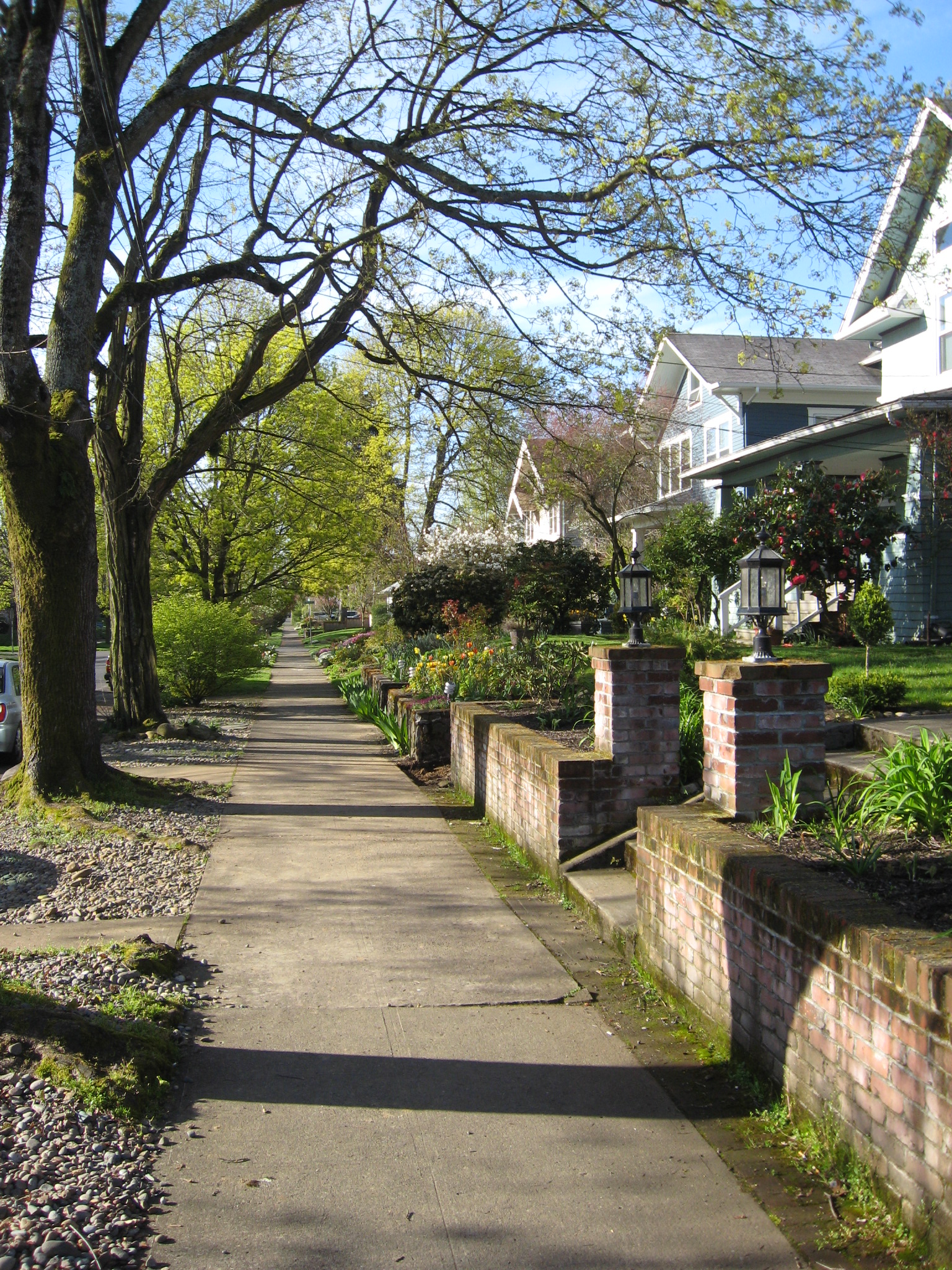
NE 42nd Avenue, south of Fremont Street

== Demographics ==
According to 1996 Census data, the Beaumont-Wilshire neighborhood consists primarily of owner-occupied, single-family housing, with approximately 5,463 residents. South of Fremont, most of the homes were built in the early 1900s and include Tudors, Craftsman, and bungalow style homes. North of Fremont early 1900s classic styles are present along with a few homes that were built after 1950.

In the 2020 census, 6,080 people lived in Beaumont-Wilshire, up 13% from 5,369 in 2010. 83% of people identified as white, 6.5% as Asian, 2.8% as Black or African American, 1.8% as American Indian or Alaska Native, 0.4% as Native Hawaiian or Pacific Islander, and 5.6% as some other race. 5.4% identified as Hispanic or Latino (any race). The median age in Beaumont-Wilshire was 43.2, the median household income was $129,000, and 26% of the neighborhood was covered by tree canopy. 90% of the eligible population voted in the 2020 general election.

== Fremont Street ("Beaumont Village") ==
NE Fremont Street, between NE 42nd and NE 50th Avenues, locally known as "Beaumont Village", serves as the focal point of activity for the Beaumont-Wilshire neighborhood. As a neighborhood center, NE Fremont Street provides a mix of housing, commercial, institutional and retail services to residents and visitors. It is a place where people can socialize, run their errands, window shop, and dine at local restaurants. Interspersed between the commercial activity are small professional offices that provide medical, legal, and financial services to the greater community.

In early August of each year, Beaumont Village hosts the "Fremont Fest", which includes live music, artists and craftspeople, sidewalk sales, face painting, horse and carriage rides, and a children's parade.

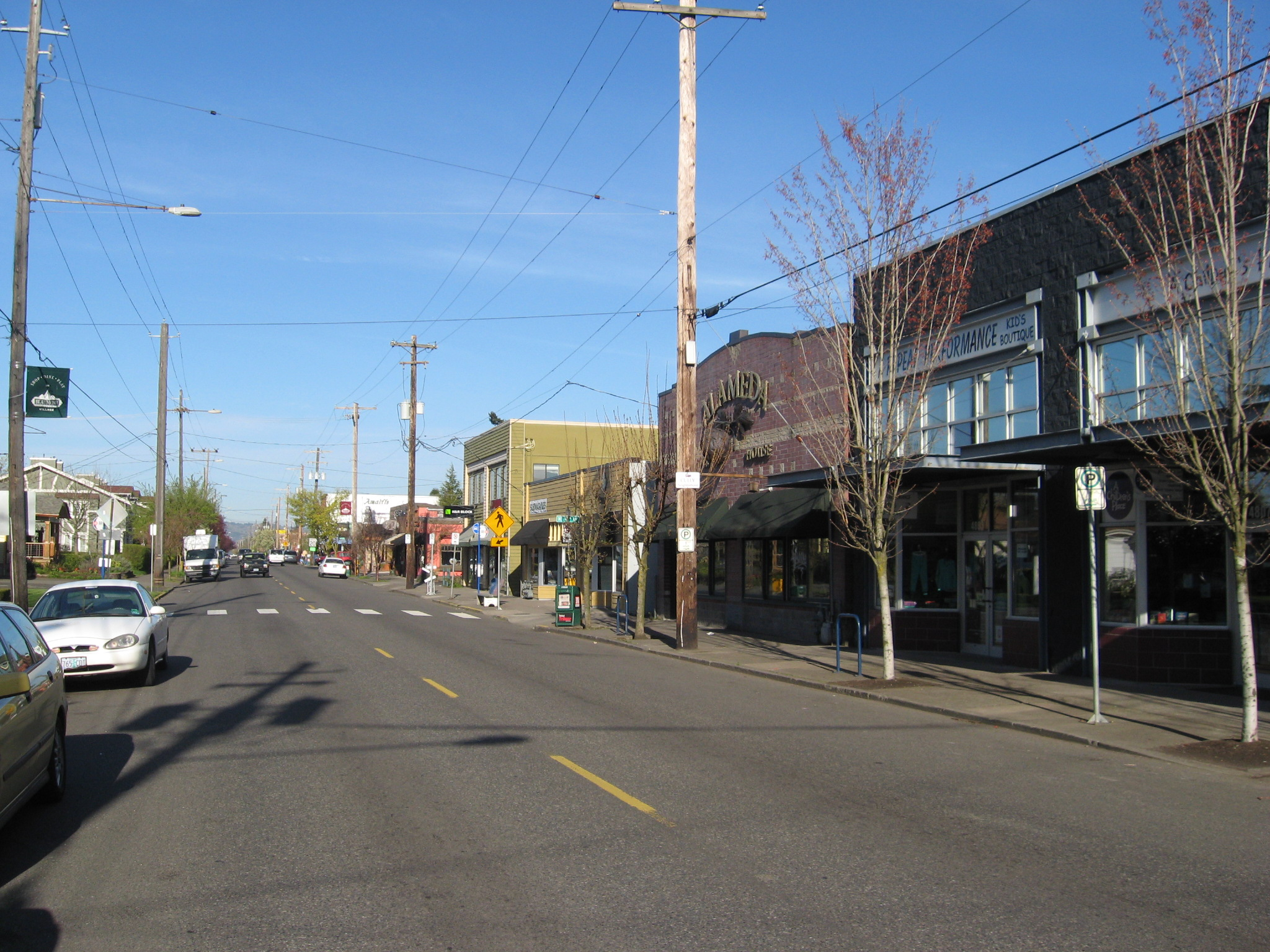
"Beaumont Village" on NE Fremont Street

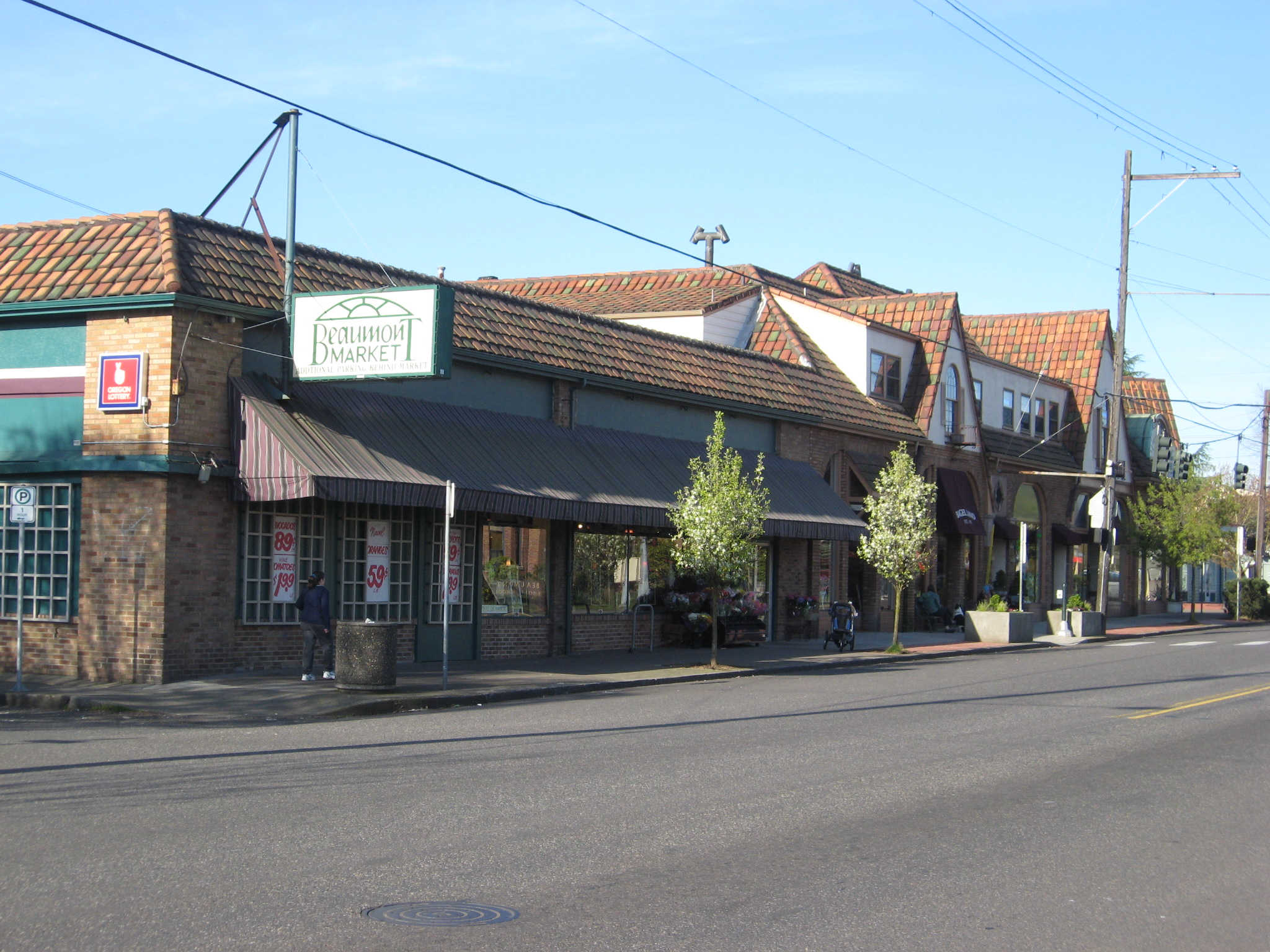
Beaumont Market

== Schools ==
Beaumont Middle School is located near the center of the neighborhood, immediately west of NE 41st Avenue on the north side of NE Fremont Street. Beaumont School originally opened in 1914, and its current two-story, brick building was completed in 1926.

Students in the neighborhood are zoned Alameda Elementary, Beaumont Middle, and Grant High School. If they live north of Skidmore Street they're zoned for Vernon K-8 and the McDaniel/Jefferson choice area.

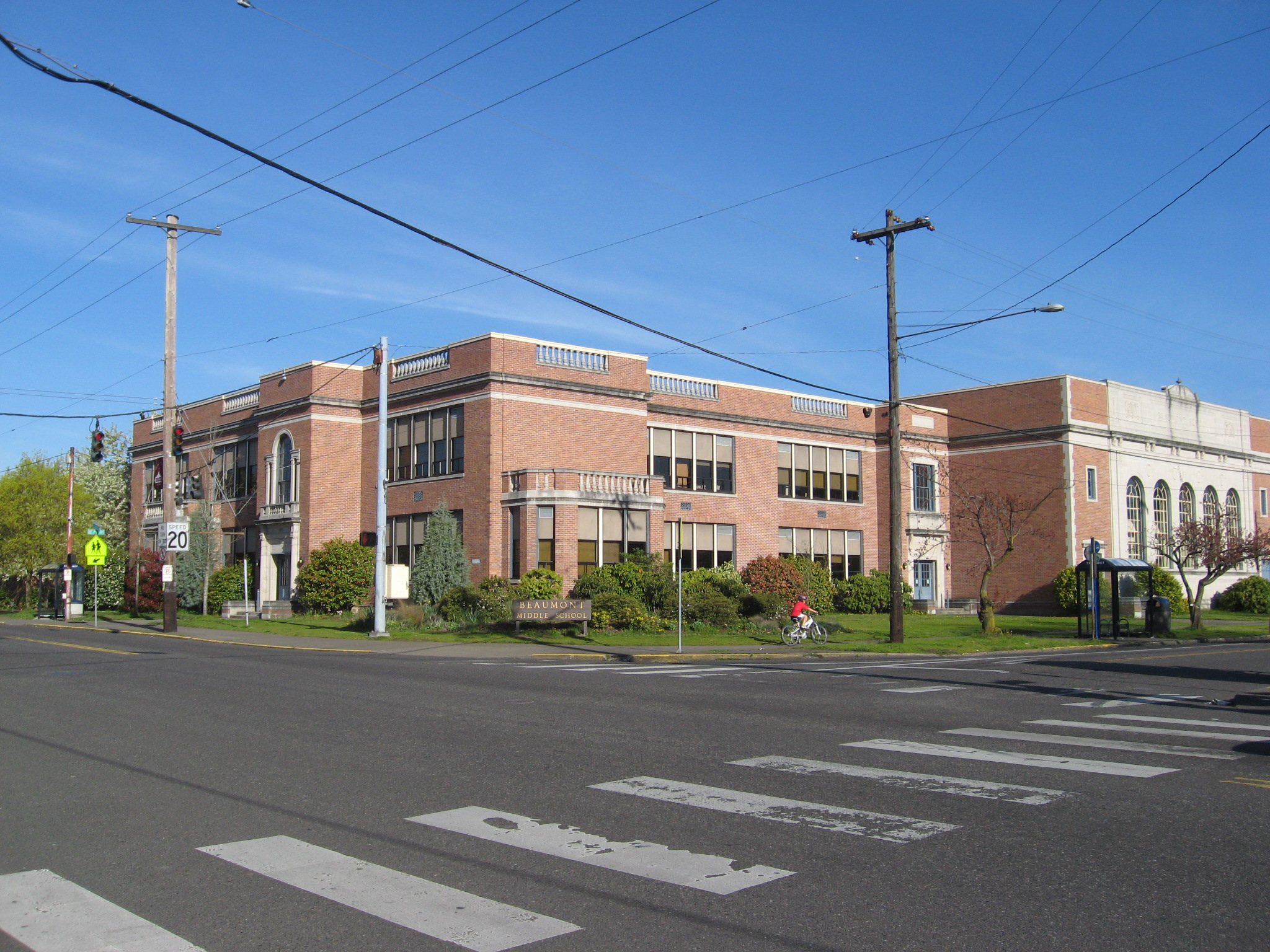
Beaumont Middle School
