= Grant Park (Portland, Oregon) =

Public park in Portland, Oregon, U.S.

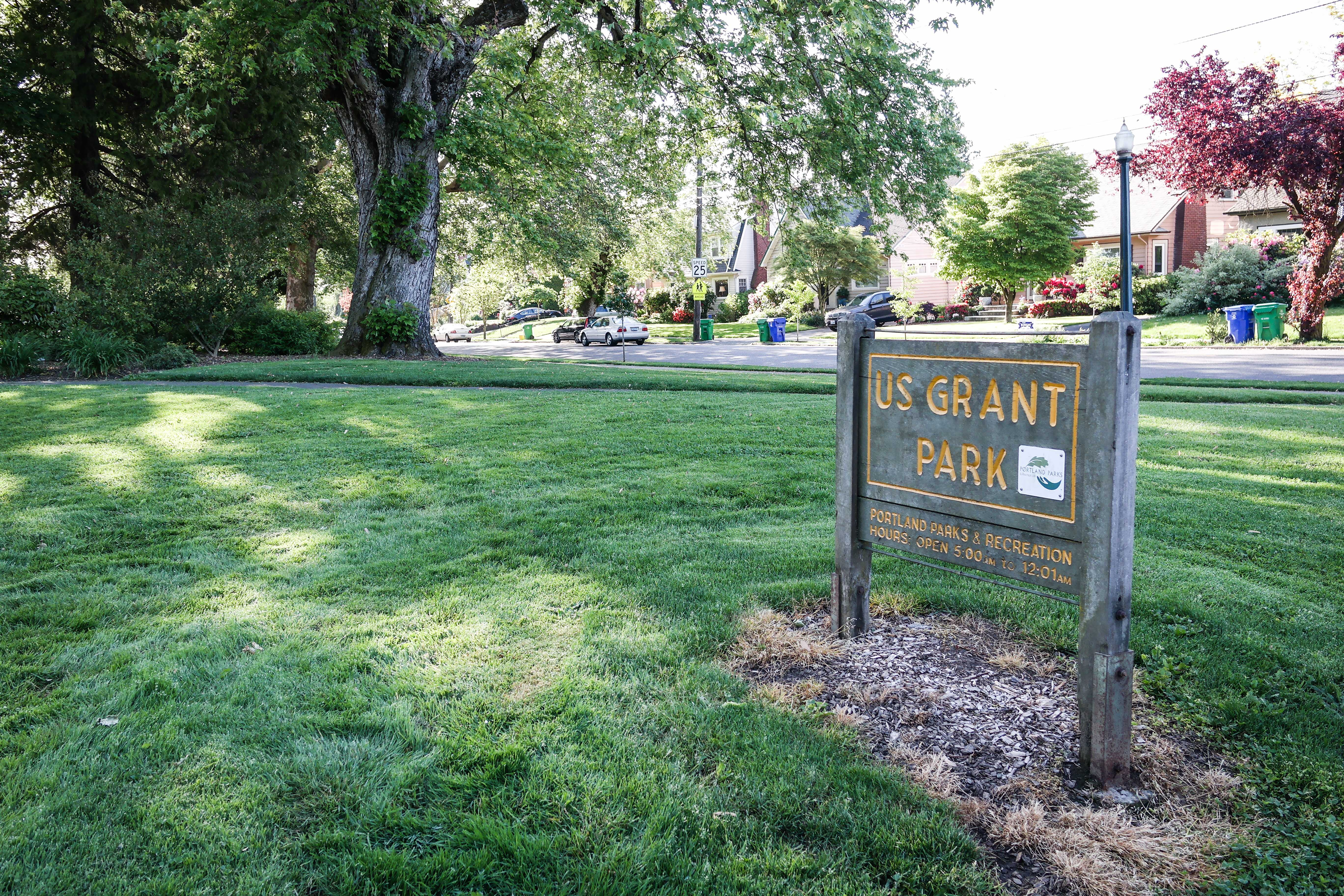
- Signage for the park, 2014

- Location within Portland, Oregon
- Location: NE 33rd Ave. and US Grant Pl. Portland, Oregon
- Coordinates: 45°32′21″N 122°37′43″W
- Area: 19.9 acres (8.1 ha)
- Operator: Portland Parks & Recreation

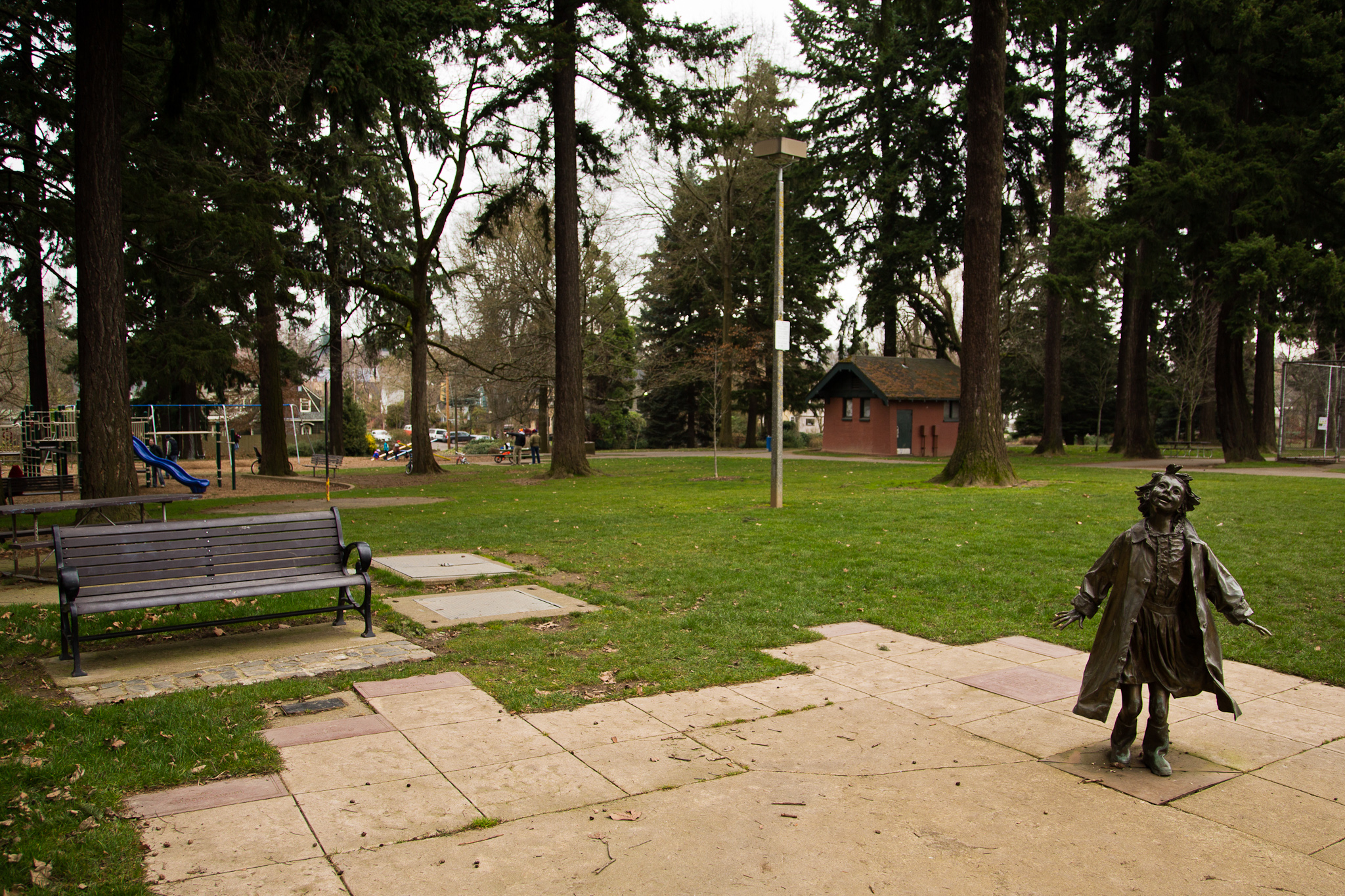
Grant Park and the statue of Ramona Quimby.

Grant Park is a park in Portland, Oregon's neighborhood of the same name.

== History ==
The park, honoring eponymous President (and former resident of Vancouver, Washington) Ulysses S. Grant, was acquired by the city in 1922. The park is contiguous with the grounds of Grant High School, and is 19.9 acres in size. Amenities include a large playground, dog park, athletic fields, walking paths, picnic facilities and tennis courts. There is also a swimming pool inside of Grant Park.

== Beverly Cleary Sculpture Garden for Children ==
The Beverly Cleary Sculpture Garden for Children was dedicated in the park on October 13, 1995. Funded by donations from Cleary fans, the park was built by the Friends of Henry and Ramona. It includes life-sized renditions by local sculptor Lee Hunt of three Cleary characters: Ramona Quimby, Henry Huggins, and Ribsy (Henry's dog). The life-sized sculptures were created using vintage clothes on wax models to create a realistic feel. The sculpture of Ramona is dressed in raincoat and boots, with a joyous expression, and is positioned such that she splashes in the garden's fountain. Granite tiles placed around the sculptures are inscribed with quotes from Cleary's most famous books.

The statues were vandalized in 2017 and 2022.

== See also ==
- List of parks in Portland, Oregon
