= Gustav Freiwald House =

Historic building in Portland, Oregon, U.S.

- U.S. National Register of Historic Places
- Portland Historic Landmark
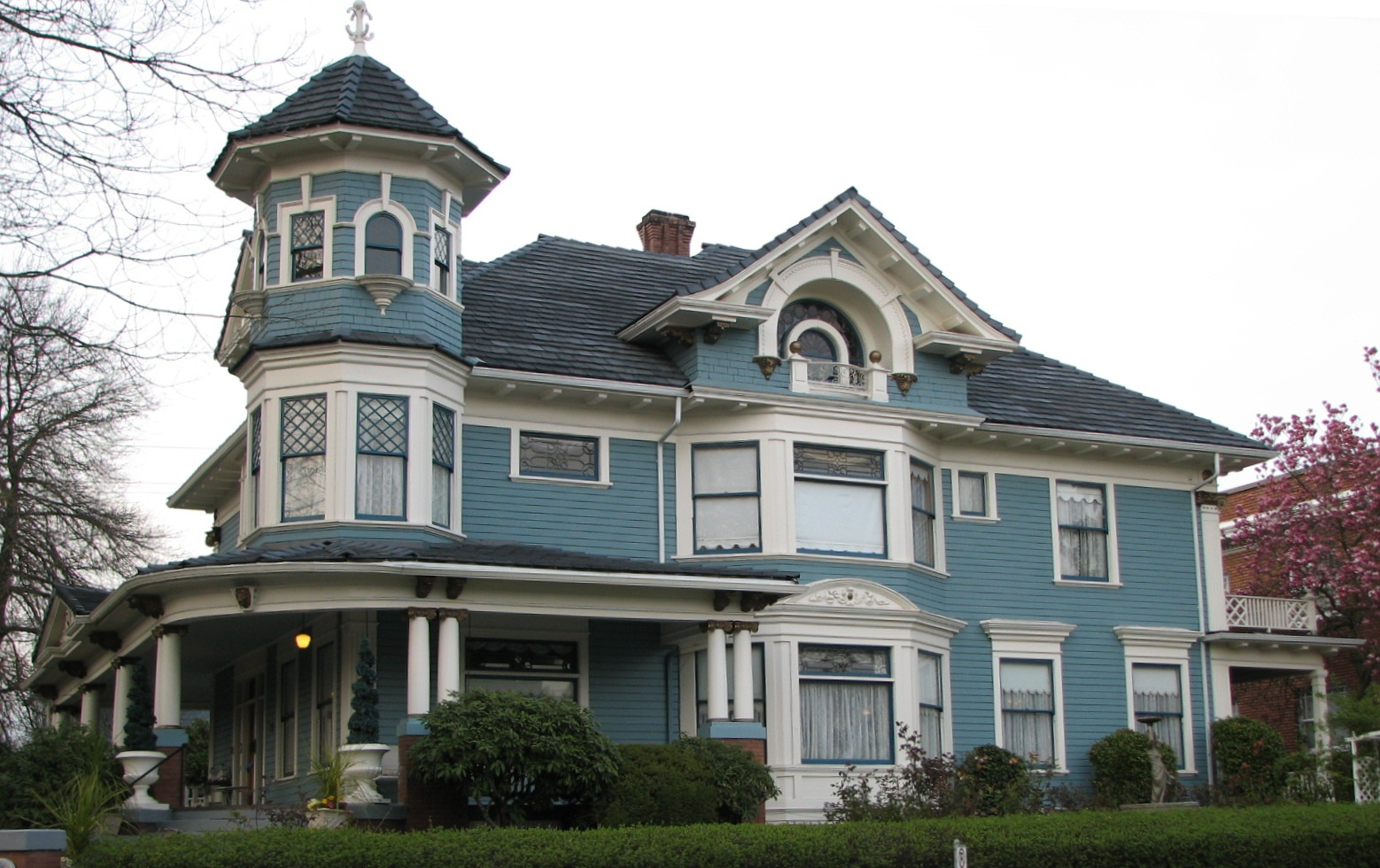
- Gustav Freiwald House in 2008

- Location within Portland, Oregon
- Location: 1810 NE 15th Avenue; Portland, Oregon
- Coordinates: 45°32′09″N 122°39′00″W
- Area: 0.2 acres (0.081 ha)
- Built: 1906
- Architectural style: Queen Anne
- NRHP reference No.: 93000454
- Added to NRHP: May 27, 1993

The Gustav Freiwald House is a house located in northeast Portland, Oregon, listed on the National Register of Historic Places.

The house was built in 1906 for Gustav Freiwald, a real estate entrepreneur and one-time owner of the Star Brewery in Vancouver, Washington. A late example of Queen Anne architecture, the house is one of the few remaining grand residences in the area of Portland platted as the Holladay Addition. The house is now part of the Irvington neighborhood.

== See also ==
- National Register of Historic Places listings in Northeast Portland, Oregon
