= Grant Park, Portland, Oregon =

Grant Park
- Neighborhood
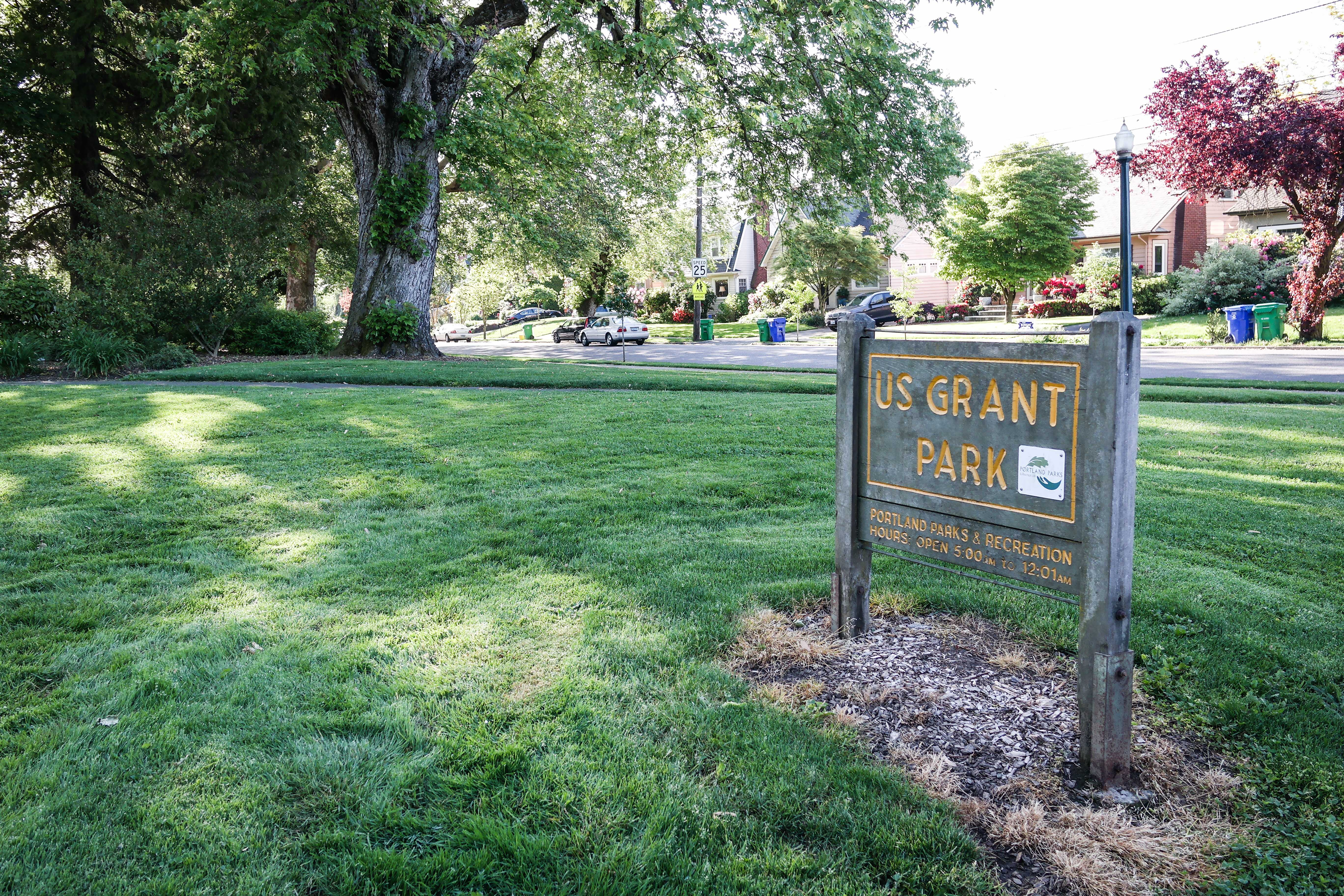
- Grant Park
- Interactive map of Grant Park
- Coordinates: 45°32′20″N 122°37′50″W
- Country: United States
- State: Oregon
- City: Portland

Government
  - Association: Grant Park Neighborhood Association
  - Coalition: Northeast Coalition of Neighborhoods

Area
  - Total: 0.46 sq mi (1.18 km^{2})

Population (2000)
  - Total: 3,469
  - Density: 7,610/sq mi (2,940/km^{2})

Housing
  - No. of households: 1364
  - Occupancy rate: 97% occupied
  - Owner-occupied: 1205 households (88%)
  - Renting: 159 households (12%)
  - Avg. household size: 2.54 persons

Grant Park is a neighborhood in the Northeast section of Portland, Oregon. The neighborhood is bordered by Alameda and Beaumont-Wilshire to the north; Rose City Park to the east; Hollywood District, Laurelhurst, and Sullivan's Gulch to the south; and Irvington to the west.

It is best known for its association with Beverly Cleary's Klickitat Street series of books, which are set in the neighborhood. Houses in the neighborhood generally date to the early 20th century, and are primarily of the Old Portland or Craftsman styles. There is a park of the same name, which is connected to Grant High School. Grant Park was designed by landscape architect Florence Holmes Gerke.
