= Northeast Portland, Oregon =

Sextant of Portland, Oregon

Coordinates: 45.568°N 122.616°W

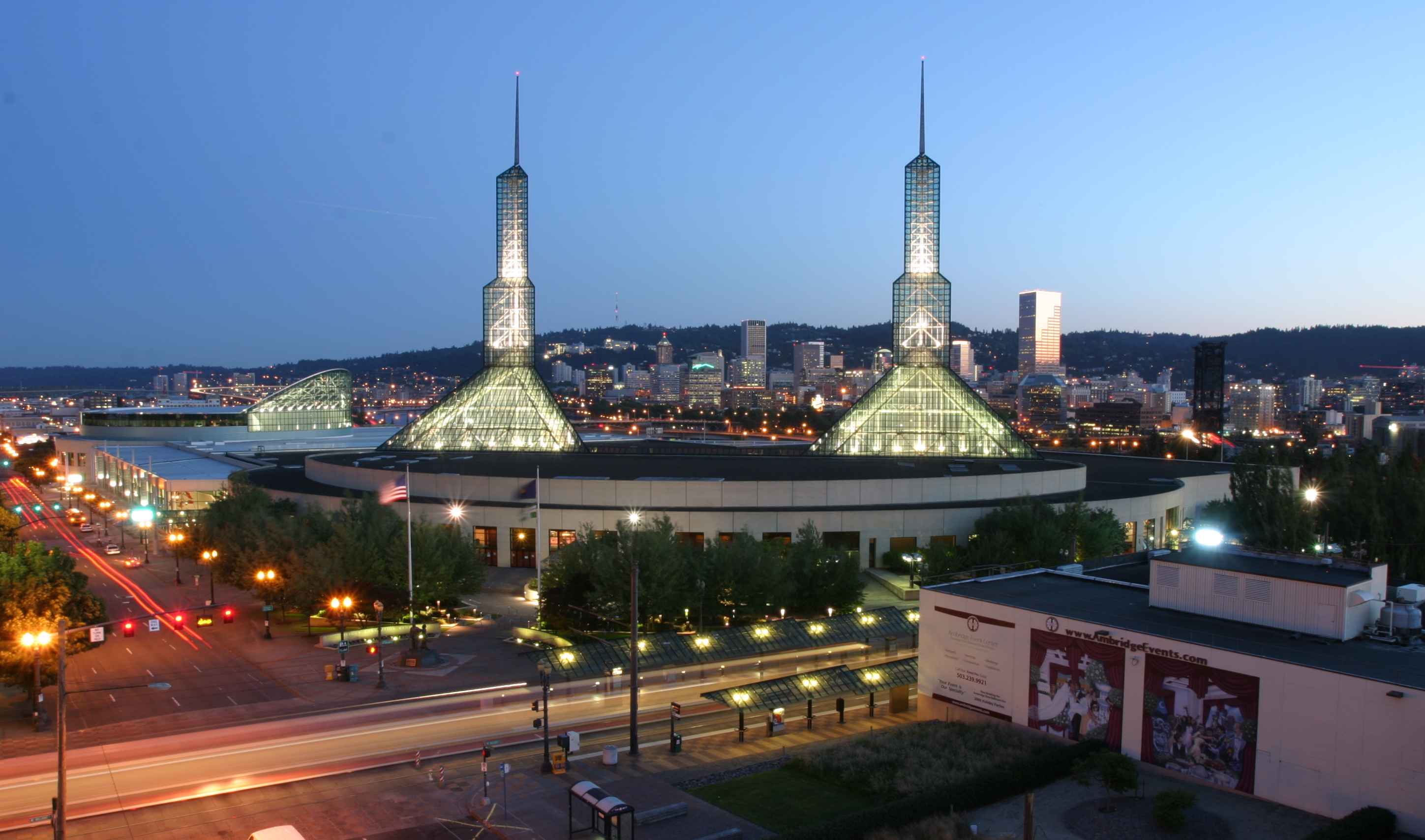
The Oregon Convention Center in inner NE Portland

Northeast Portland is one of the six major divisions of Portland, Oregon.

Northeast Portland contains a diverse collection of neighborhoods. For example, while Irvington and the Alameda Ridge feature some of the oldest and most expensive homes in Portland, nearby King is a more working-class neighborhood. Because it is so large, Northeast Portland can essentially be divided ethnically, culturally, and geographically into inner and outer sections. The inner Northeast neighborhoods that surround Martin Luther King Jr. Blvd. were once predominantly African-American, resembling typical urban inner-city environments found in most major U.S. cities. However, the demographics are now changing due to the process of gentrification. In 2010, the King neighborhood was 25.9% Black or African-American, a 41.3% decrease since 2000. Inner Northeast includes several shopping areas, such as the Lloyd District, Alberta Arts District (Portland, Oregon) and Hollywood, and part of the affluent Irvington, Alameda, Grant Park, Sullivan's Gulch and Laurelhurst neighborhoods and nearby developments. Lloyd District is a mixed-use area, with high-density residential development.

At the base of Northeast where its border meets Southeast, an area near the Burnside Bridge has been redeveloped into a bustling nightlife and entertainment district. By 2006, the area was established enough to get its own nickname: LoBU, in reference to Lower (numerically) Burnside.

== See also ==
- Albina, Portland, Oregon
- National Register of Historic Places listings in Northeast Portland, Oregon
- Neighborhoods of Portland, Oregon
