= Alameda Ridge =

Ridge in Portland, Oregon, U.S.

Coordinates: 45°32′42″N 122°33′58″W

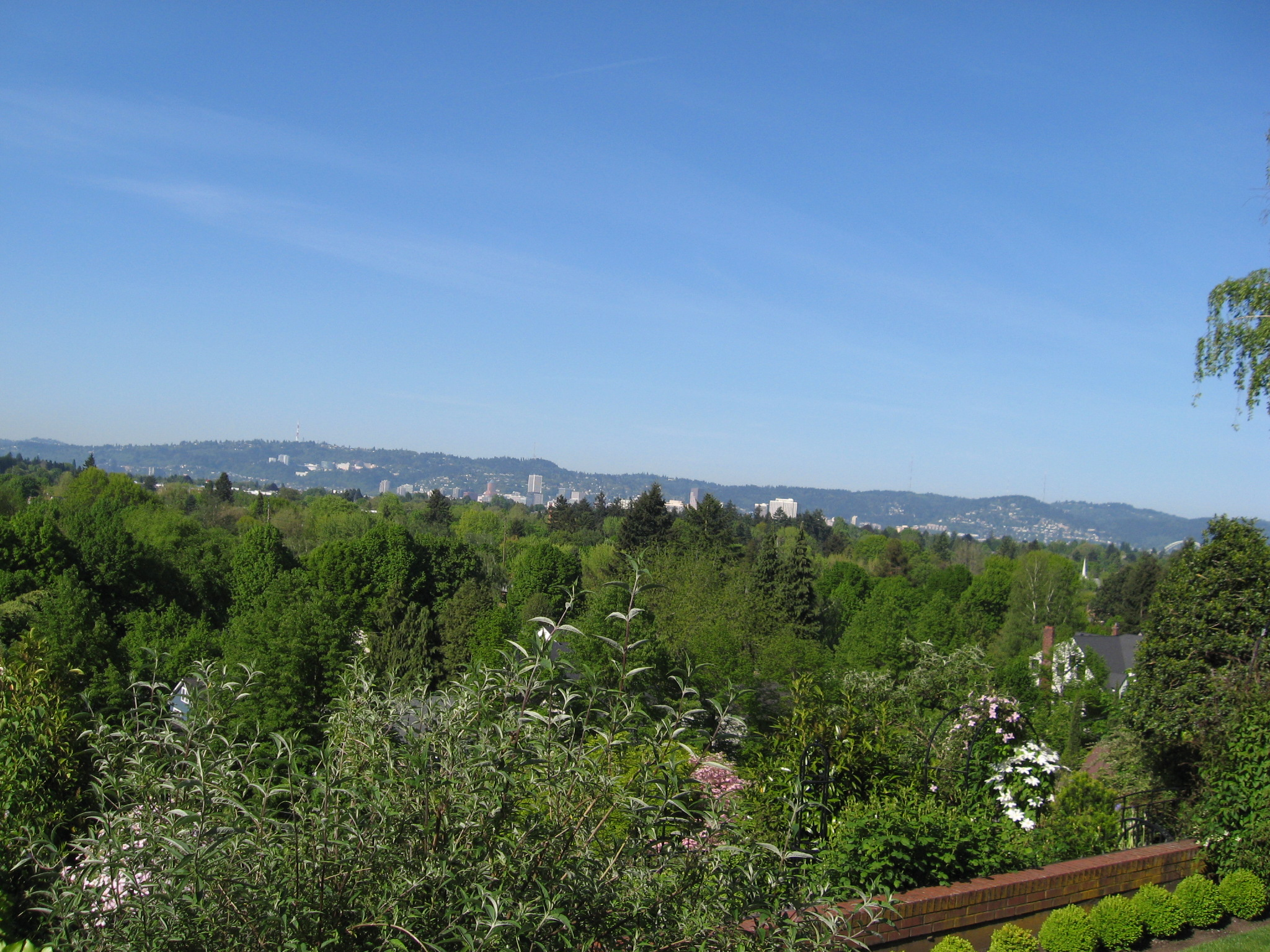
View of downtown Portland from the top of the ridge at Alameda and 44th

The Alameda Ridge is a large gravel bar located in Portland, Oregon, United States. It forms a ridgeline above much of north and southeast Portland, with views of downtown and west side neighborhoods. Alameda Ridge runs through the Madison South, Roseway, Rose City Park, Beaumont-Wilshire, Alameda, and Sabin neighborhoods.

== Geologic history ==
Alameda Ridge was formed between 15,000 and 13,000 years ago at the end of the last ice age when the ice dam containing Glacial Lake Missoula collapsed some 40 times, causing the Missoula Floods, some of the largest floods known on earth. The flood waters spilled across Idaho and eastern Washington, surged down the Columbia River and through the Gorge, flooding the Willamette Valley as far south as Eugene, Oregon. These floods covered the city of Portland, Oregon in approximately 400 feet (120 m) of water, carving out Sullivan's Gulch, the large ravine that holds Interstate 84, and depositing large volumes of unconsolidated silt, sand, gravel, and boulders. As the west-flowing waters rushed around Rocky Butte, a volcanic cinder cone in the Boring Lava Field, sediments were deposited on the west side of the butte forming an approximately 100 to 150-foot (46 m) high bar that became Alameda Ridge. The ridge extends west roughly 6 miles (9.7 km) from Rocky Butte to approximately 15th Avenue and Skidmore Street.

== Human history ==
Portland residents began building on Alameda Ridge around the turn of the 20th century, as electric streetcars allowed real estate development to grow away from the city core. The steep hillside on the south side of the ridge provides beautiful views of Northeast Portland and the downtown skyline. This allowed early developers to cater to wealthy individuals. Because the Ridge was developed before cars were the primary mode of transportation, many public stairways were built along the southern hillside to allow easier travel between neighborhoods. These stairways are still present today and are maintained by the City of Portland. Alameda Ridge runs through the Madison South, Roseway, Rose City Park, Beaumont-Wilshire, Alameda, and Sabin Neighborhoods, with some of the most expensive homes (some being worth more than one million dollars) located along the upper edge of the southern slope in the Rose City Park, Beaumont, Alameda Neighborhoods. A growing concern among locals is the present-day removal or renovation of long-existing structures due to the need to repair them as well as the pressure to conform to more modern styles of living.

== Gallery ==
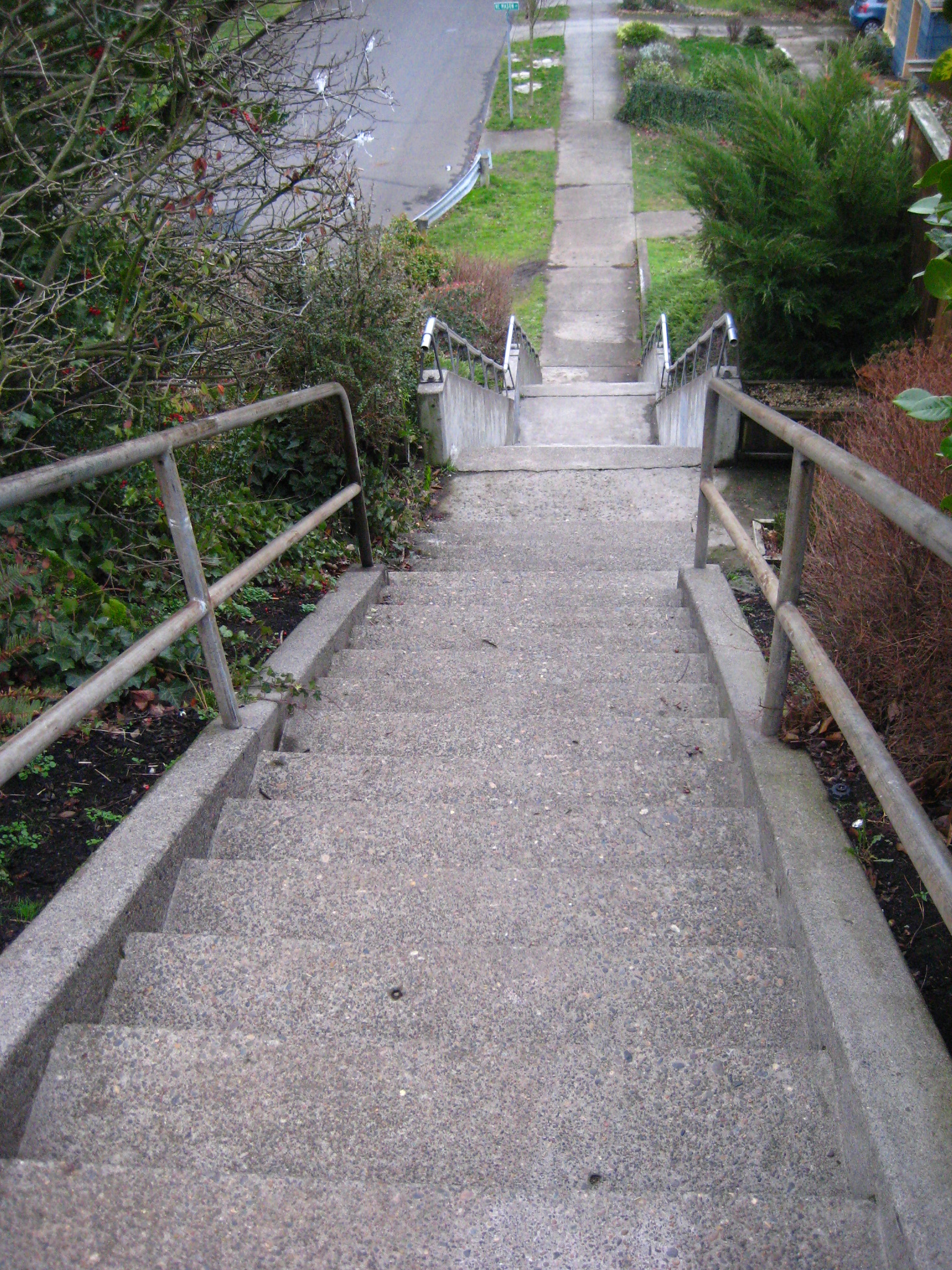
Stairway at 19th Ave.

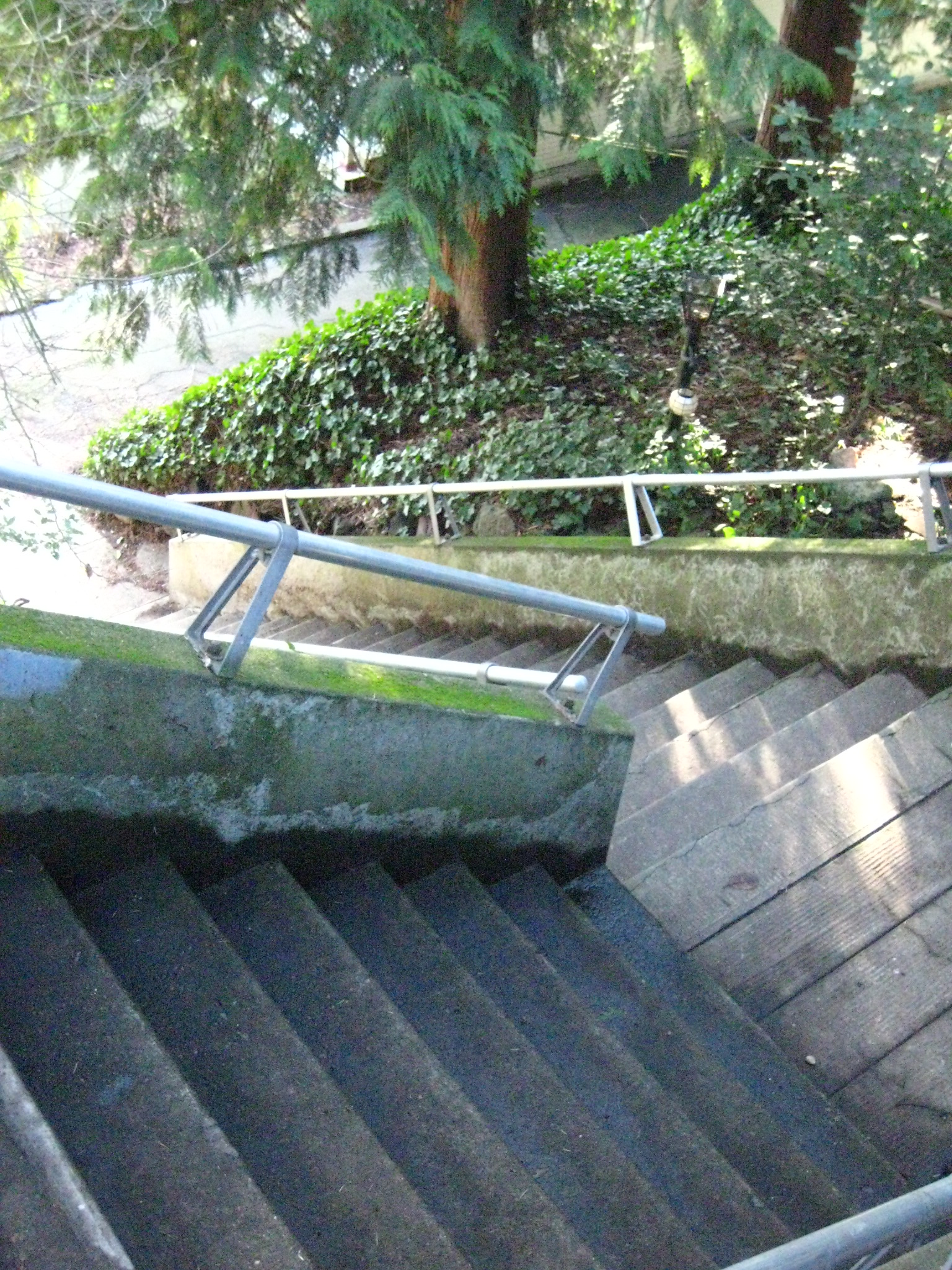
Stairway at 50th Ave.

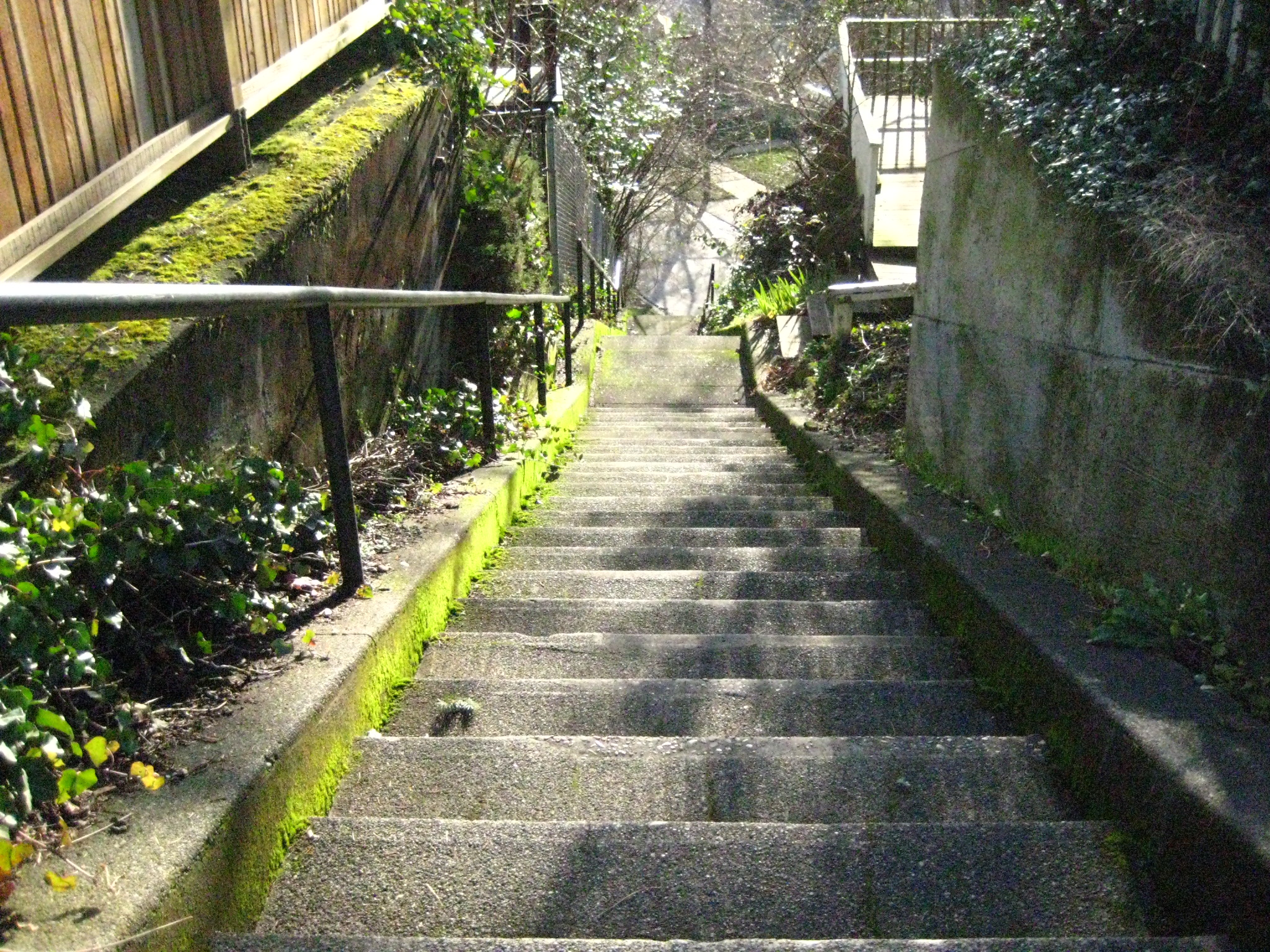
Stairway at 51st Ave.

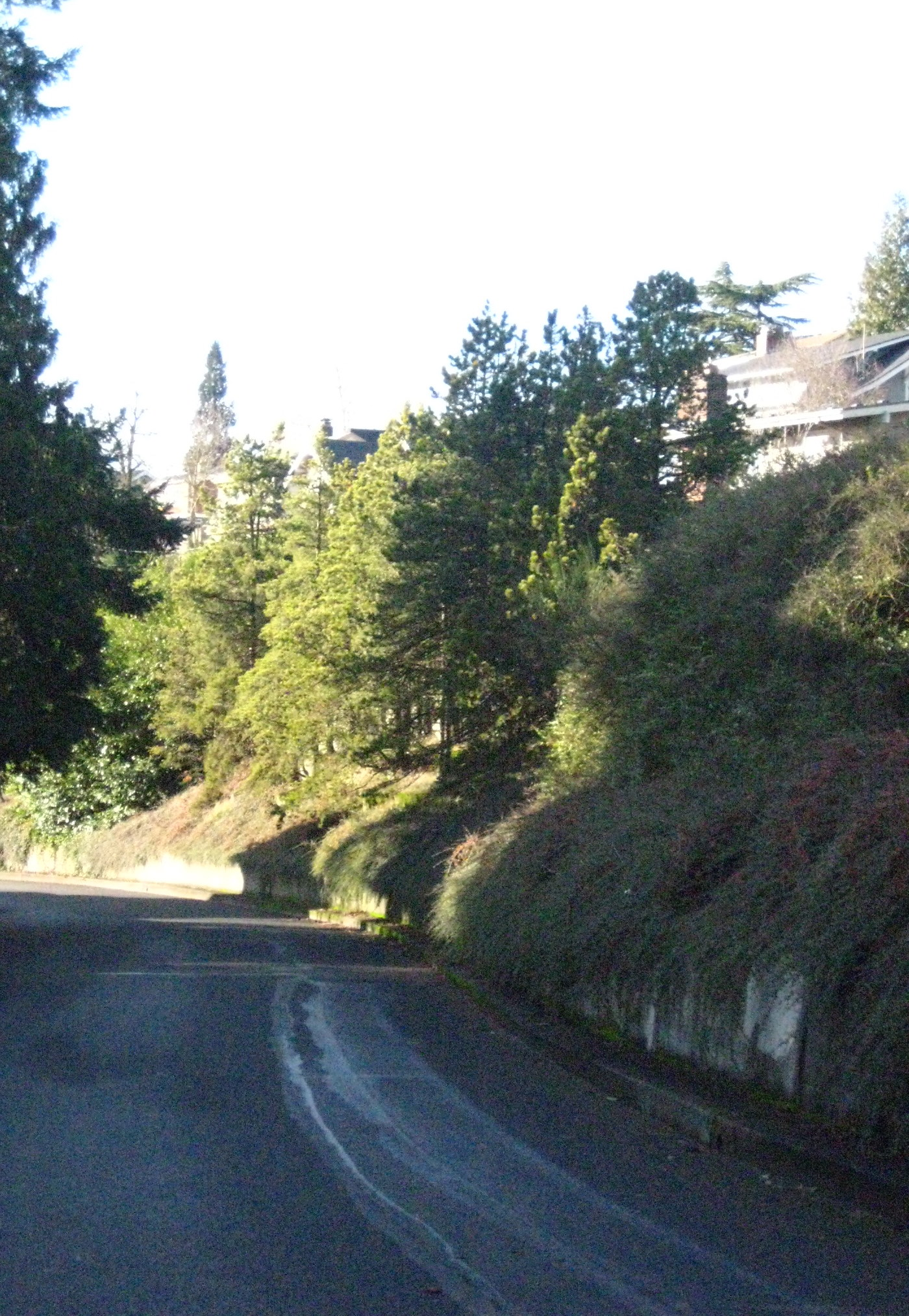
Alameda Ridge to the west from NE Wistaria Dr.
