= Irvington, Portland, Oregon =

Neighborhood in Portland, Oregon, U.S.

Irvington
- Neighborhood
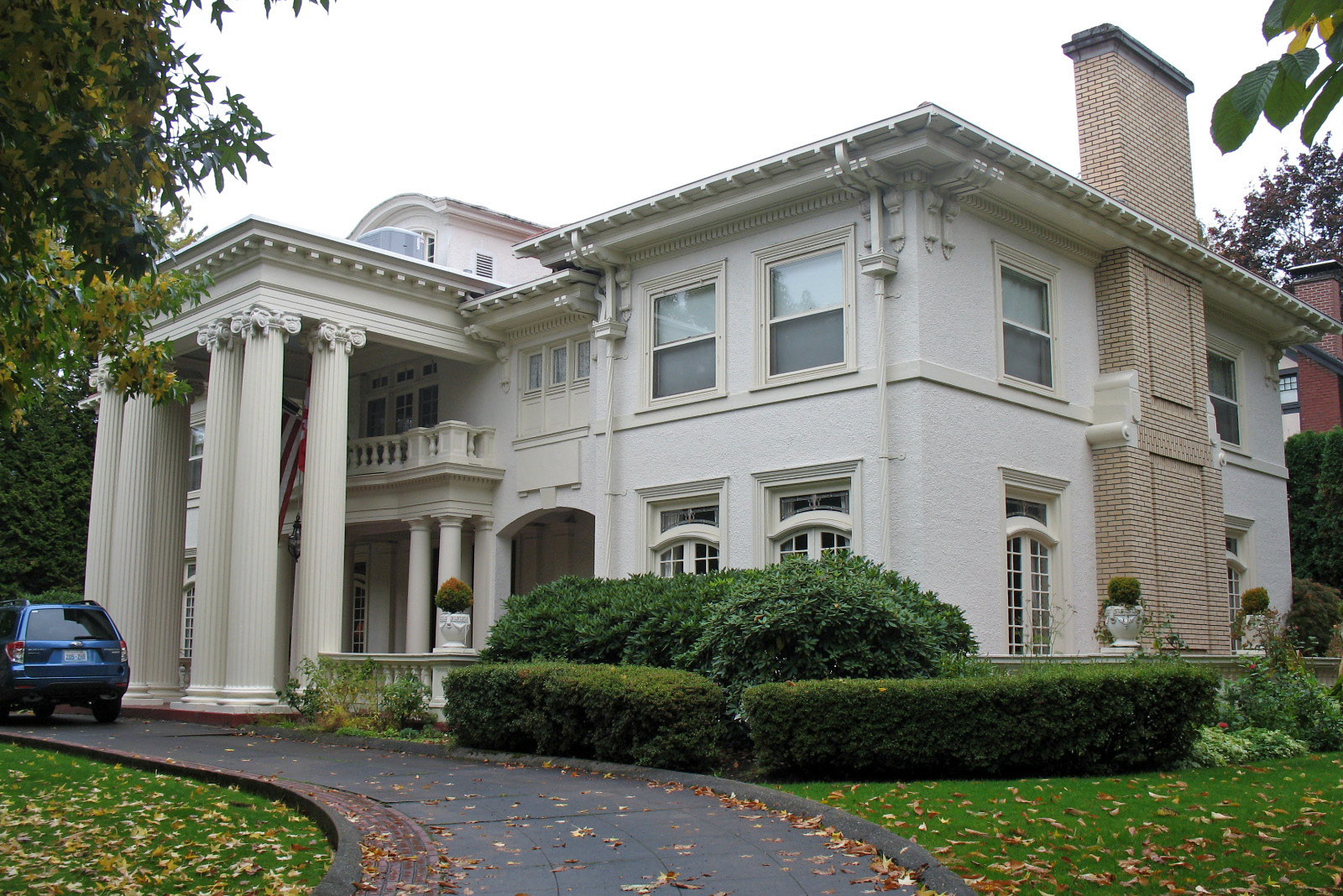
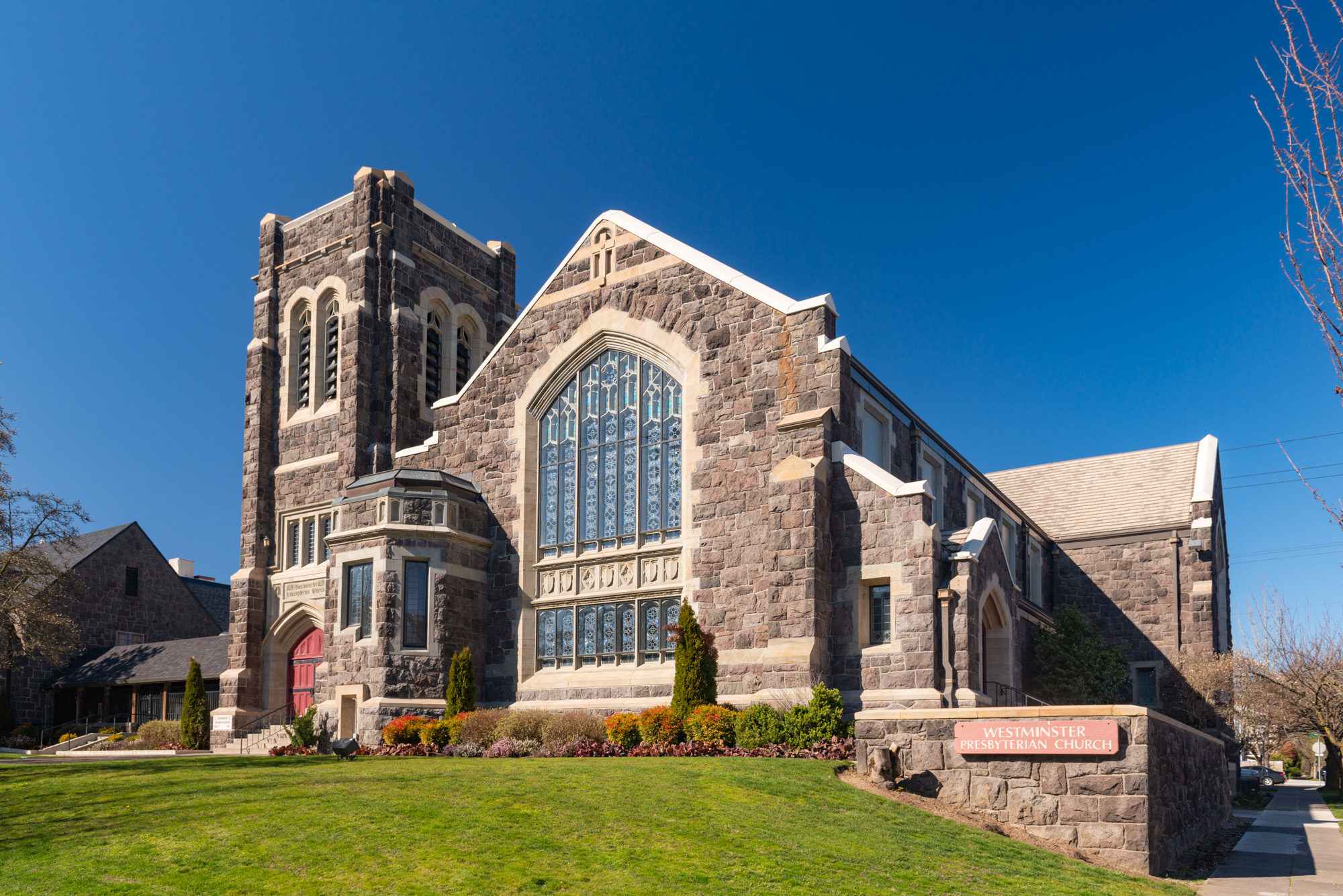
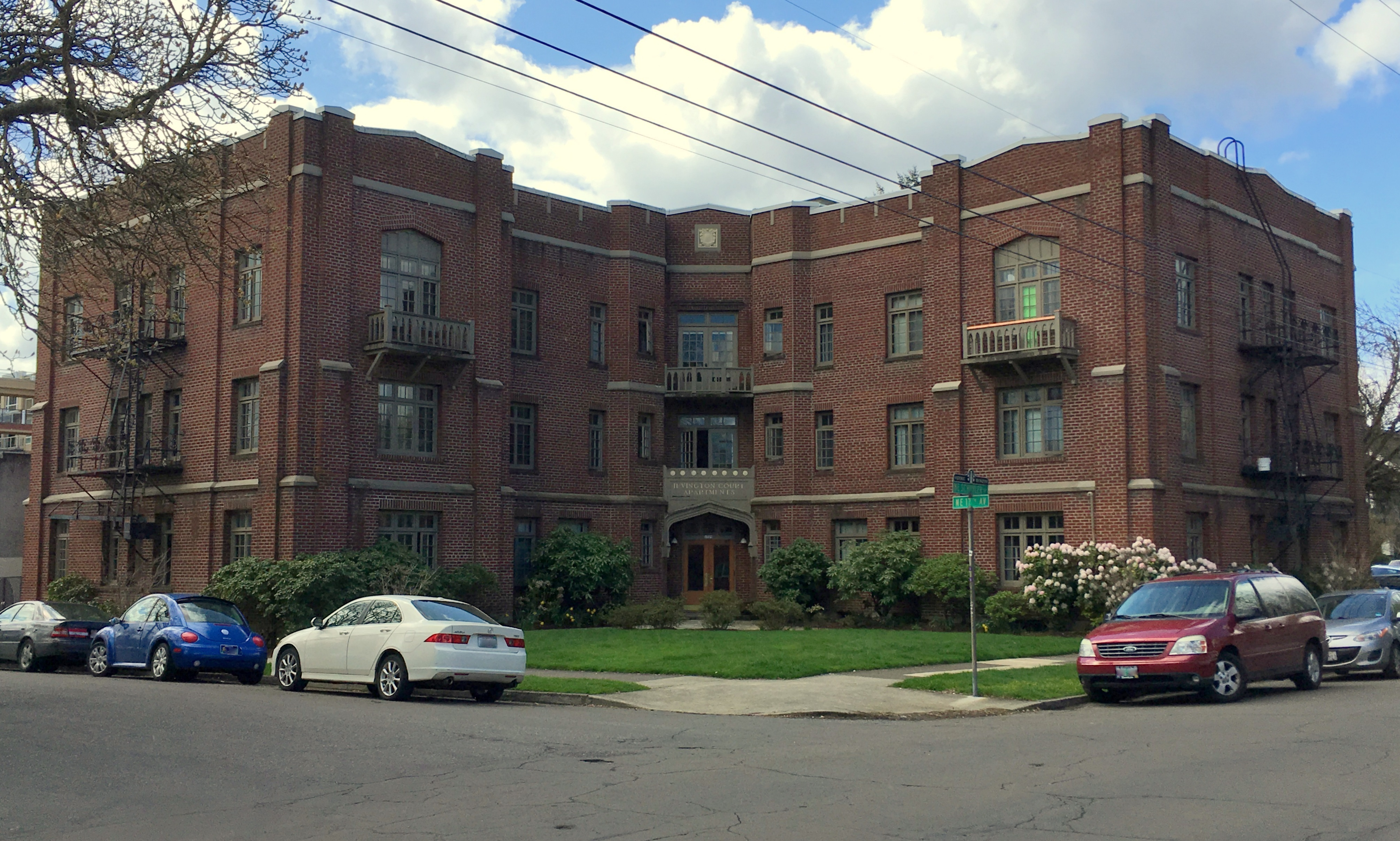
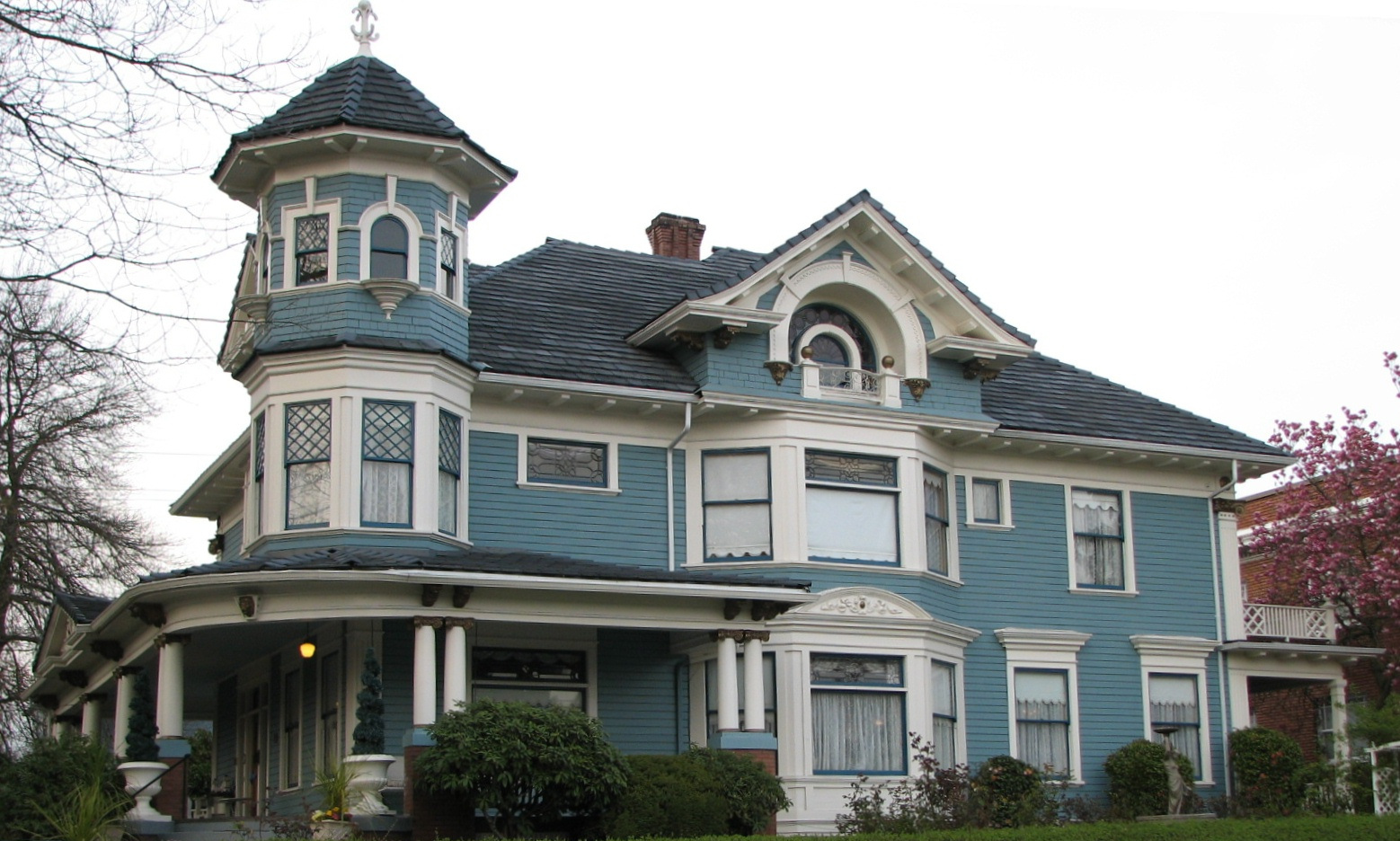
- Clockwise from top left: The Robert F. Lytle House, Westminster Presbetarian Church, The Gustav Freiwald House, Irvington Court Apartments
- Interactive map of Irvington
- Coordinates: 45°32′26″N 122°38′54″W
- Country: United States
- State: Oregon
- City: Portland

Government
  - Association: Irvington Community Association
  - Coalition: Northeast Coalition of Neighborhoods

Area
  - Total: 0.65 sq mi (1.68 km^{2})

Population (2000)
  - Total: 6,684
  - Density: 10,300/sq mi (3,980/km^{2})

Housing
  - No. of households: 3159
  - Occupancy rate: 96% occupied
  - Owner-occupied: 1448 households (46%)
  - Renting: 1711 households (54%)
  - Avg. household size: 2.12 persons
- Irvington Historic District
- U.S. National Register of Historic Places
- U.S. Historic district
- Location: Northeast Portland
- Area: 583 acres (236 ha)
- Built: 1891–1948
- MPS: Historic Residential Suburbs in the United States, 1830–1960
- NRHP reference No.: 10000850
- Added to NRHP: October 22, 2010

Irvington is a neighborhood in the Northeast section of Portland, Oregon. According to the city's Office of Community and Civic Life, it consists of a rectangular area extending east to west from NE 7th Ave. to NE 26th Ave., and north to south from NE Fremont St. to NE Broadway. It borders the King, Sabin, and Alameda neighborhoods to the north; Alameda and Grant Park to the east; Sullivan's Gulch and the Lloyd District to the south; and Eliot to the west. (The Sabin and Alameda neighborhoods extend into the northeastern part of Irvington, creating two areas of overlap.)

The neighborhood is distinguished by a number of large stately homes, often positioned on multiple or oversized lots. The Irvington Community Association funds its activities by holding a well-attended tour of these homes each spring.

== History ==
The Irvington Addition was platted in 1887 and underwent its initial development in the 1890s under the oversight of developer Ellis Hughes and the Irvington Investment Company. The addition was planned as a self-contained middle to upper class residential district in which commercial activity was to be prohibited, so as to maintain property values. After a period of nominal growth, development in Irvington began to slow due to competition from the Rose City Park and Laurelhurst developments, as well as the outbreak of World War I. The neighborhood was added to the National Register of Historic Places as the Irvington Historic District in 2010.

== Proposed boundary decrease ==
In December 2014, the Irvington Historic District Northeast Boundary Decrease Committee proposed removing 34 blocks from the Irvington Historic District. Citing differences in physical appearance and historic development, the committee of Irvington property owners advocated trimming an area roughly bounded on the south by NE Knott Street, on the north by NE Fremont Street, on the east by NE 27th, and on the west by NE 21st. The committee suggested that the proposed boundary decrease area more closely resembles an early-to-mid twentieth century residential working-class neighborhood, not the core area of historic Irvington.
