= Alameda, Portland, Oregon =

Alameda
- Neighborhood
- Interactive map of Alameda
- Coordinates: 45.5482°N 122.6307°W
- Country: United States
- State: Oregon
- City: Portland

Government
  - Association: Alameda Neighborhood Association
  - Coalition: Northeast Coalition of Neighborhoods

Area
  - Total: 0.49 sq mi (1.27 km^{2})

Population (2020)
  - Total: 5,455
  - Density: 11,100/sq mi (4,300/km^{2})

Housing
  - No. of households: 2064
  - Occupancy rate: 97.9% occupied
  - Owner-occupied: 1651 households (80%)
  - Renting: 413 households (20%)
  - Avg. household size: 2.6 persons

Alameda is a neighborhood in Portland, Oregon, United States that is located on the Alameda Ridge with views of Downtown, the Willamette River, and the Cascades. Northeast Fremont Street is the neighborhood's main east-west thoroughfare and NE 33rd, its main north-south thoroughfare, makes up its eastern boundary.

The community's side streets wind around the hill, past cottages and expansive Craftsman homes. Alameda is located between Beaumont-Wilshire and the Hollywood District. Alameda Elementary School of Portland Public Schools is located in the neighborhood, as is The Madeleine School, a Catholic K-8 school. The middle and high school students attend Beaumont Middle School and Grant High School.

== History ==
The Alameda neighborhood was established on the 1859 land claim of William C. Bowering and his wife, Isabelle. The area became known as Gravelly Hill Road for a gravel pit at NE 33rd and Fremont. In 1909, the Alameda Land Company laid out the Alameda Park subdivision that was then annexed to the city of Portland. The development advertised an extremely broad exclusion in its printed brochure, declaring "no people of undesirable colors and kinds."

The name comes from the Spanish word "alamo," meaning a poplar or cottonwood tree. "Alameda" means, precisely, a public walk or promenade lined with poplar trees, and, by extension, a street lined with trees, like the English word "parkway."

There is also an Alameda Street in the neighborhood, which is the subject of the Elliott Smith song "Alameda" on his Either/Or album.

== Gallery ==
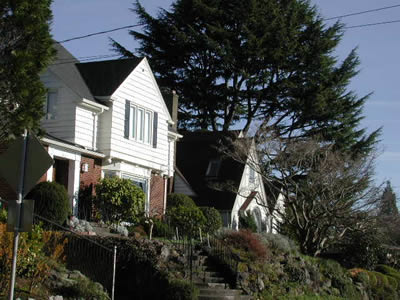
Homes in Alameda

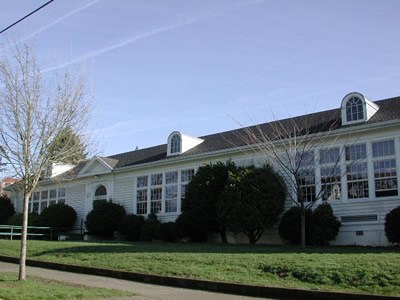
Alameda Elementary School
