= Paxton Gate Portland =

Pair of shops in the U.S. state of Oregon

Coordinates: 45.5539°N 122.6754°W

Logo

Paxton Gate Portland is a pair of shops in Portland, Oregon, United States. The business is named after San Francisco-based Paxton Gate, which was founded by Sean Quigley in 1992, but is locally owned and highlights the Pacific Northwest. The shops focus on taxidermy and also stocks fossils, insects, jewelry, plants, and science kits. Paxton Gate Portland also offers taxidermy workshops. The business operates at 4204 Mississippi Avenue in the north Portland part of the Boise neighborhood, and at 811 23rd Avenue in northwest Portland's Northwest District.

== History ==
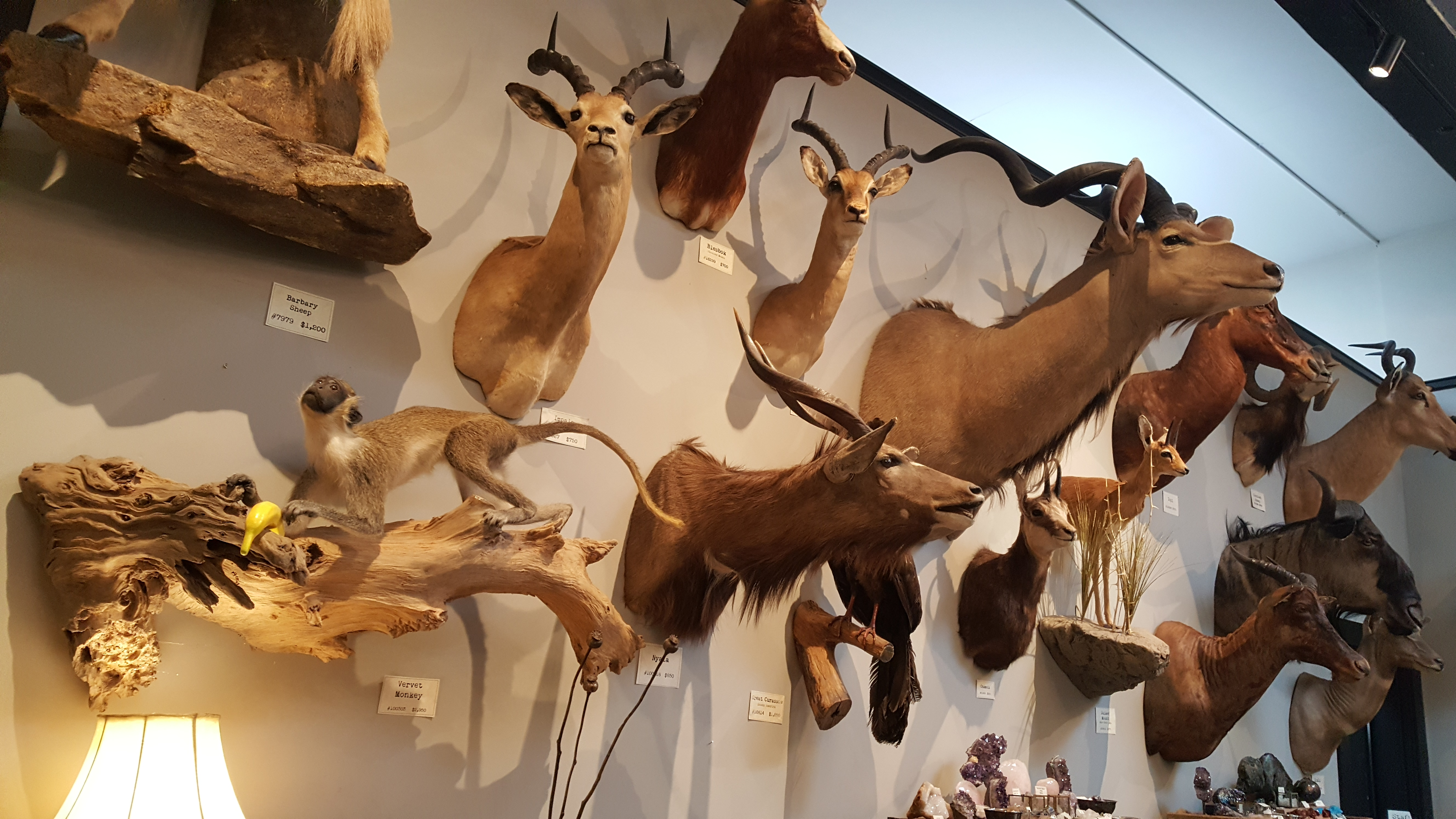
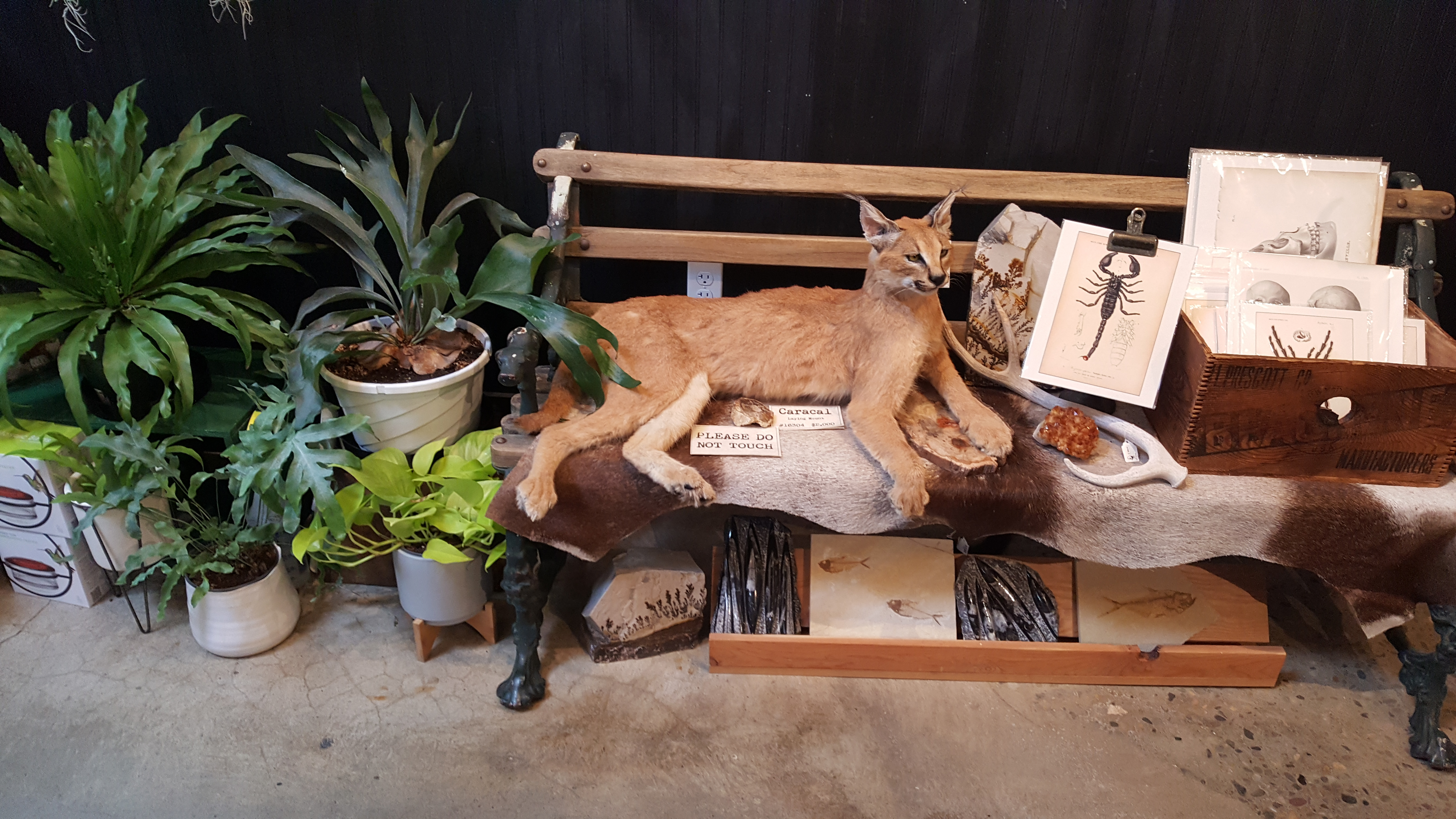
Interior of the Northwest District shop, 2022

Quigley opened Paxton Gate's Curiosities for Kids in 2008 and licensed a second operation, Paxton Gate Portland, to owners Andy and Susan Brown of Portland, Oregon, with a second Portland location opening in 2019. The original Portland store achieved a certain amount of television fame when it was featured as "The Knot Store" in an episode of the second season of the popular IFC television series Portlandia, created by Fred Armisen and Carrie Brownstein, guest starring Jeff Goldblum. Later, Armisen included Paxton Gate Portland in a travel piece he authored for the UK-based Guardian Newspaper in May 2013. Arimsen would later bring actor Jerry Seinfeld to the store for an episode of Comedians in Cars with Coffee.

In 2010, Paxton Gate Portland was opened by Andy and Susan Brown. The shop hosted a one-year anniversary party. While Paxton Gate Portland shares much of the same inventory with the San Francisco store, as well as its emphasis on taxidermy, the natural sciences, gardening tools, carnivorous plants, succulents and Tillandsia and jewelry, the store(s) also pursue Pacific Northwest-based artists and designers, including framed entomology art by Insectism (Tak Hau) as well as Jewelry designs by Theeth (Kimi Kaplowitz) and the Orb Weaver spider web ceramics by Angela White. The stores host regular in-person events. Some of the notable events feature Tyler Thrasher with crystallized cicadas and bones, The Falconer, John Prucich with live raptors in store and more regularly hosted events like Insect Safari and the entomology collection of Don Ehlen, as well as bi-weekly in store entomology pinning classes and seasonally hosted taxidermy workshops.

A 30,000-year-old cave hyena skull was stolen from the Northwest District shop in 2023.

== Reception ==
Willamette Week has said the shop "embodies the city’s 'Keep Portland Weird' motto with its eccentric offerings".
