= Fried Egg I'm in Love =

Restaurant in Portland, Oregon, U.S.

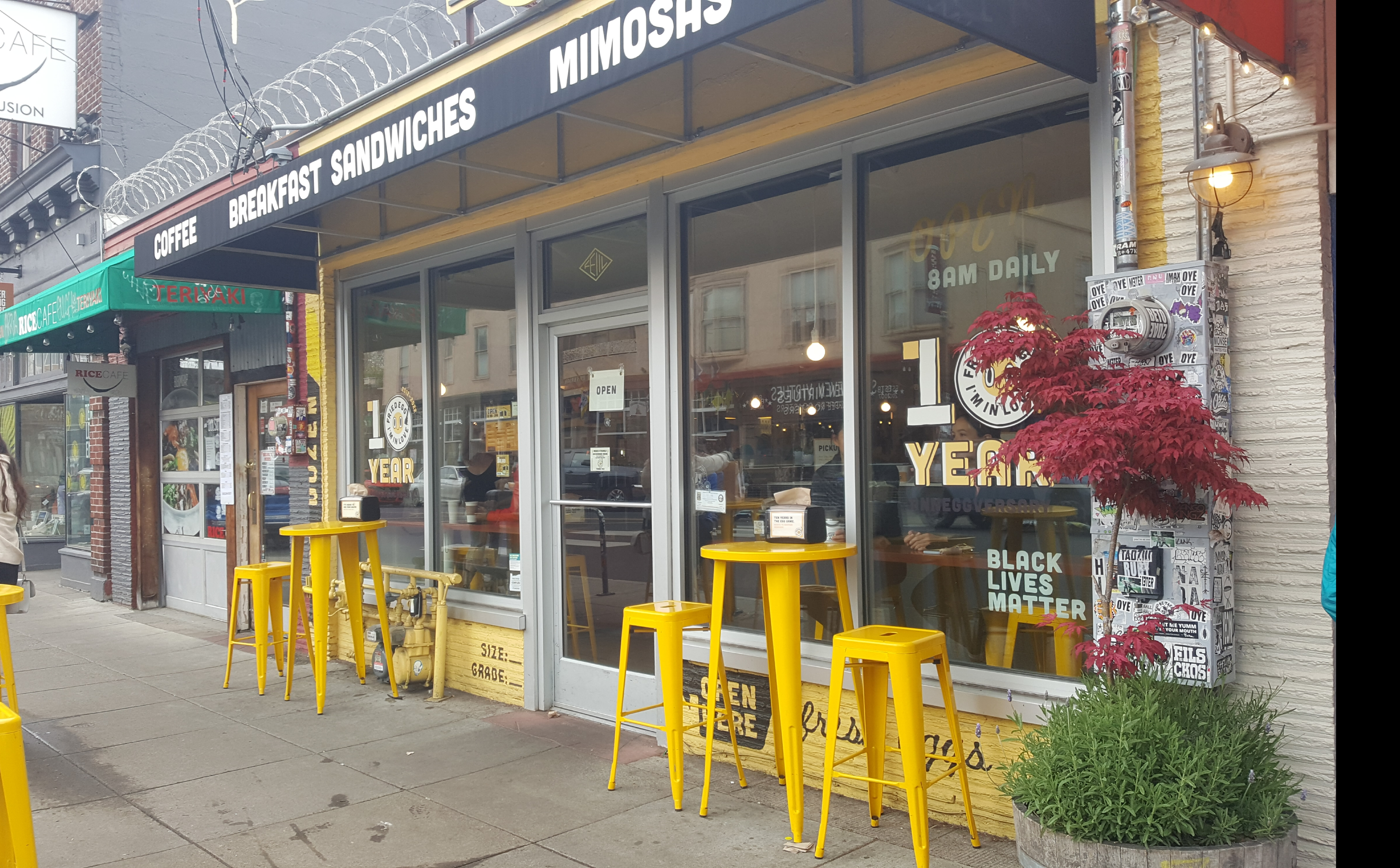
- Exterior of the restaurant on Hawthorne Boulevard, 2022

Restaurant information
- Established: 2012
- Owners: Jace Krause and Ryan Lynch
- Food type: Breakfast
- Location: Portland, Oregon, United States
- Other locations: Locations at Pioneer Courthouse Square, Sunnyside, and Prost Marketplace
- Website: friedegglove.com

Fried Egg I'm in Love is a restaurant with multiple locations in Portland, Oregon. Its menu mostly consists of breakfast sandwiches with references to bands, singers, and songs. Initially established from a food cart, Fried Egg I'm in Love was founded by Jace Krause and Ryan Lynch in 2012. A second location was opened at Pioneer Courthouse Square in 2017, solely owned by Krause, as well as two more locations in 2019 and 2020. The restaurant was featured in several city listings and gained praise for its breakfast sandwiches.

== Description ==
Fried Egg I'm in Love has been described as a "music pun-themed" breakfast sandwich restaurant (the title of the business references "Friday I'm in Love", a 1992 song by The Cure). The signature sandwich is the Yolko Ono (a reference to Yoko Ono), described as "oniony" sausage patties with pesto, a fried egg, and toasted sourdough. The Egg Zeppelin (a reference to English rock band Led Zeppelin) has two vegetable patties, a fried egg, two slices of cheddar cheese, and aardvark aioli. The Free-Range Against the Machine (a reference to American rock band Rage Against the Machine) has egg, avocado, tomato, and havarti.

== History ==
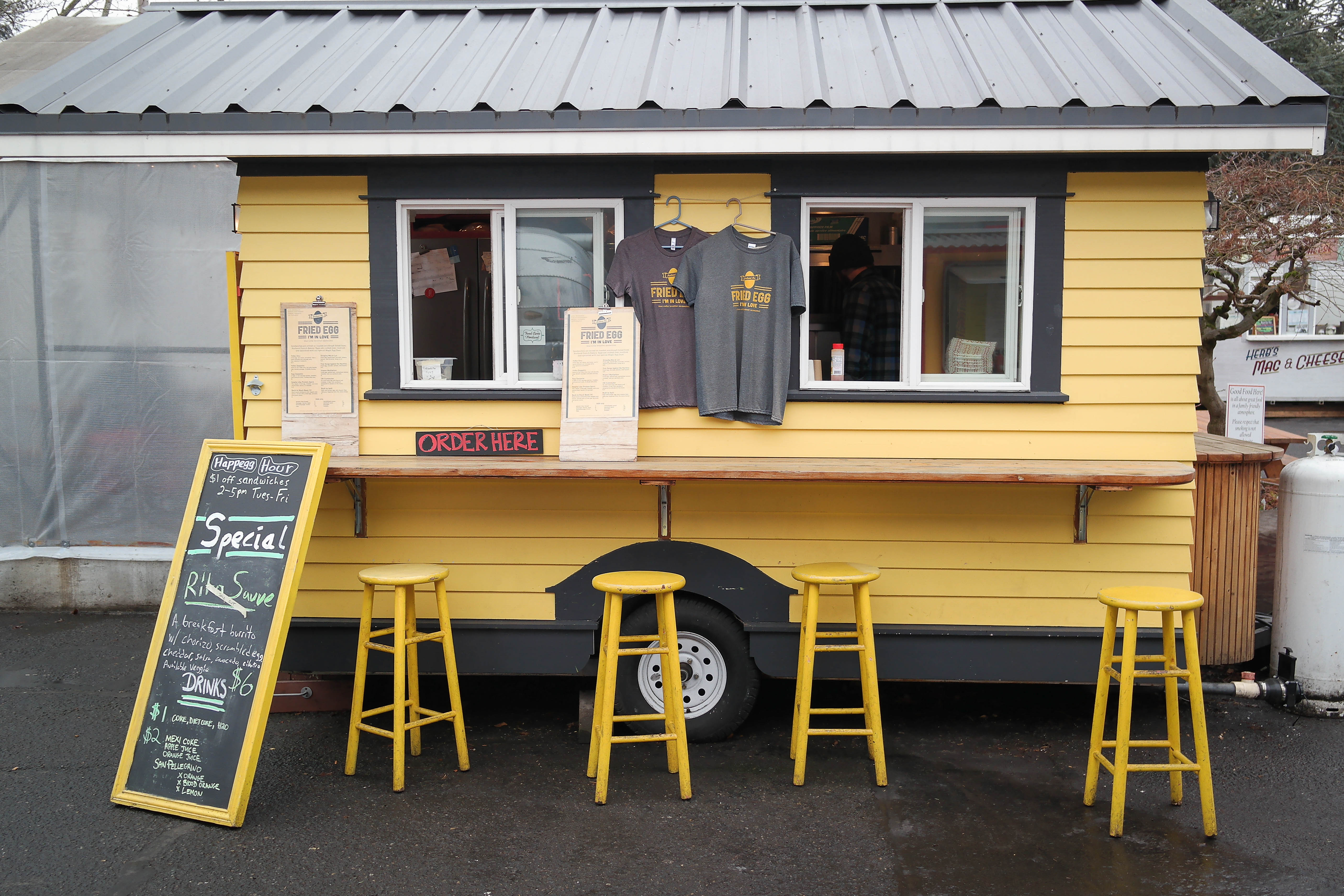
Food cart in 2013

Fried Egg I'm in Love initially operated from a single food cart. Jace Krause and Ryan Lynch started the business in 2012. According to Eater Portland, Krause "had basically no experience running a business when he started" and he launched Fried Egg I'm in Love "for just $10,000 by getting a rent-to-own deal on an existing cart".

In 2017, Krause became the sole owner and a second location opened at Pioneer Courthouse Square in downtown Portland. A brick and mortar restaurant began operating on Hawthorne Boulevard in southeast Portland's Sunnyside neighborhood in 2019. In 2020, the business opened another cart at the pod Prost Marketplace, in the north Portland part of the Boise neighborhood. Fried Egg I'm in Love was featured in the Netflix travel documentary series Somebody Feed Phil in 2022.

In 2023, the business increased prices because of the rising cost of eggs. Eggs were also stolen from the food cart in north Portland in January. In February, Fried Egg I'm in Love was the first food cart business invited to use Lovely Rita's kitchen at The Hoxton as part of a pop-up series. In late 2023, Krause announced plans to close the Prost Marketplace cart in December and open a nearby restaurant at Fremont and Mississippi in January 2024. The restaurant opened on January 15.

Workers announced plans to organize a union in 2024.

== Reception ==
Food cart at Pioneer Courthouse Square, 2022

Michael Russell included the restaurant in The Oregonian's 2020 list of "Portland's 40 best inexpensive restaurants". Alex Frane included Fried Egg I'm in Love in Eater Portland's 2021 list of "17 Spots to Grab Amazing Breakfast Sandwiches". In 2021, Portland Monthly included the business in a list of eleven breakfast sandwiches "to get you out of bed". The magazine included the Yolko Ono in a 2022 list of the city's twelve best breakfasts.

The Daily Hive included Fried Egg I'm in Love in 2021 lists of the "5 best Portland sandwiches available for pick-up or delivery" and "7 brunch spots in Portland that won't break the bank". Caitlin Flynn selected Fried Egg I'm in Love for Oregon in Eat This, Not That's 2022 overview of the best breakfast sandwiches in each U.S. state.
