= Prost Marketplace =

Food cart pod in Portland, Oregon, U.S.

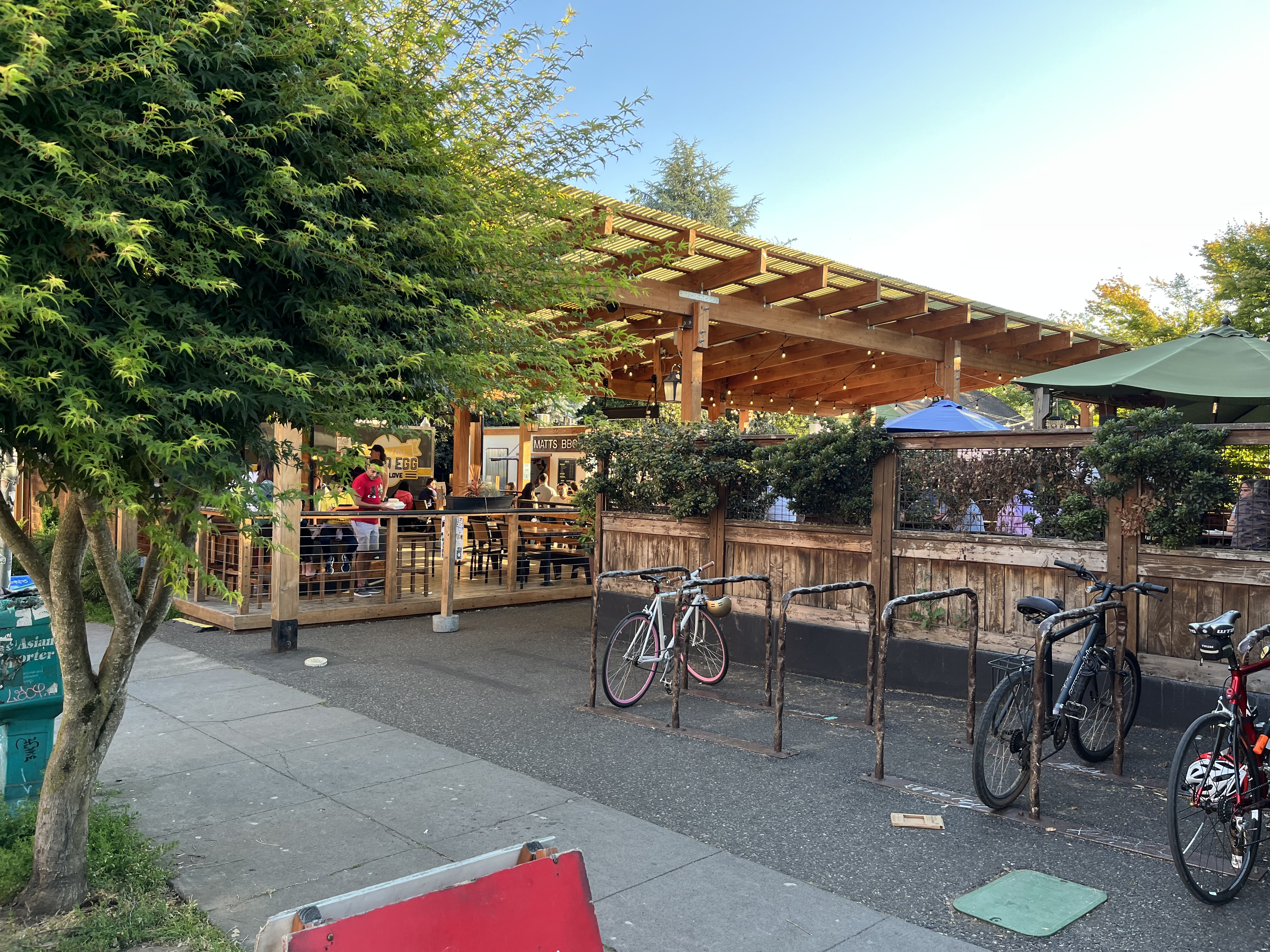
- The food cart pod in 2022

- Location: Portland, Oregon, U.S.
- Location within Portland, Oregon
- Coordinates: 45°33′16″N 122°40′33″W

Prost Marketplace (also known as the Mississippi Marketplace) is a food cart pod in Portland, Oregon, United States.

== Description and history ==
Prost Marketplace is a food cart pod in the north Portland part of the Boise neighborhood. The pod's patio was expanded and all-weather covering was added in 2019. Outdoor seating was covered and heated, as of 2021.

=== Tenants ===
Tenants have included Bloodbuzz, Breadbox, Burger Stevens, Caspian Kabob, Desi PDX, Fried Egg I'm in Love, Little Conejo, Matt's BBQ, Nico's Ice Cream, and Pastrami Zombie.

Mole Mole began operating in the pod in 2024.

Eggslut began operating in the pod in 2026.

== Reception ==
Michael Russell of The Oregonian has called Prost Marketplace the city's best food cart pod. In 2021, Matthew Singer of Willamette Week called Prost Marketplace "the superteam of Portland food cart pods".

The pod was included in Eater Portland's 2022 "Handy Dining Guide to North Mississippi Avenue".
