= JinJu Patisserie =

Bakery in Portland, Oregon, U.S.

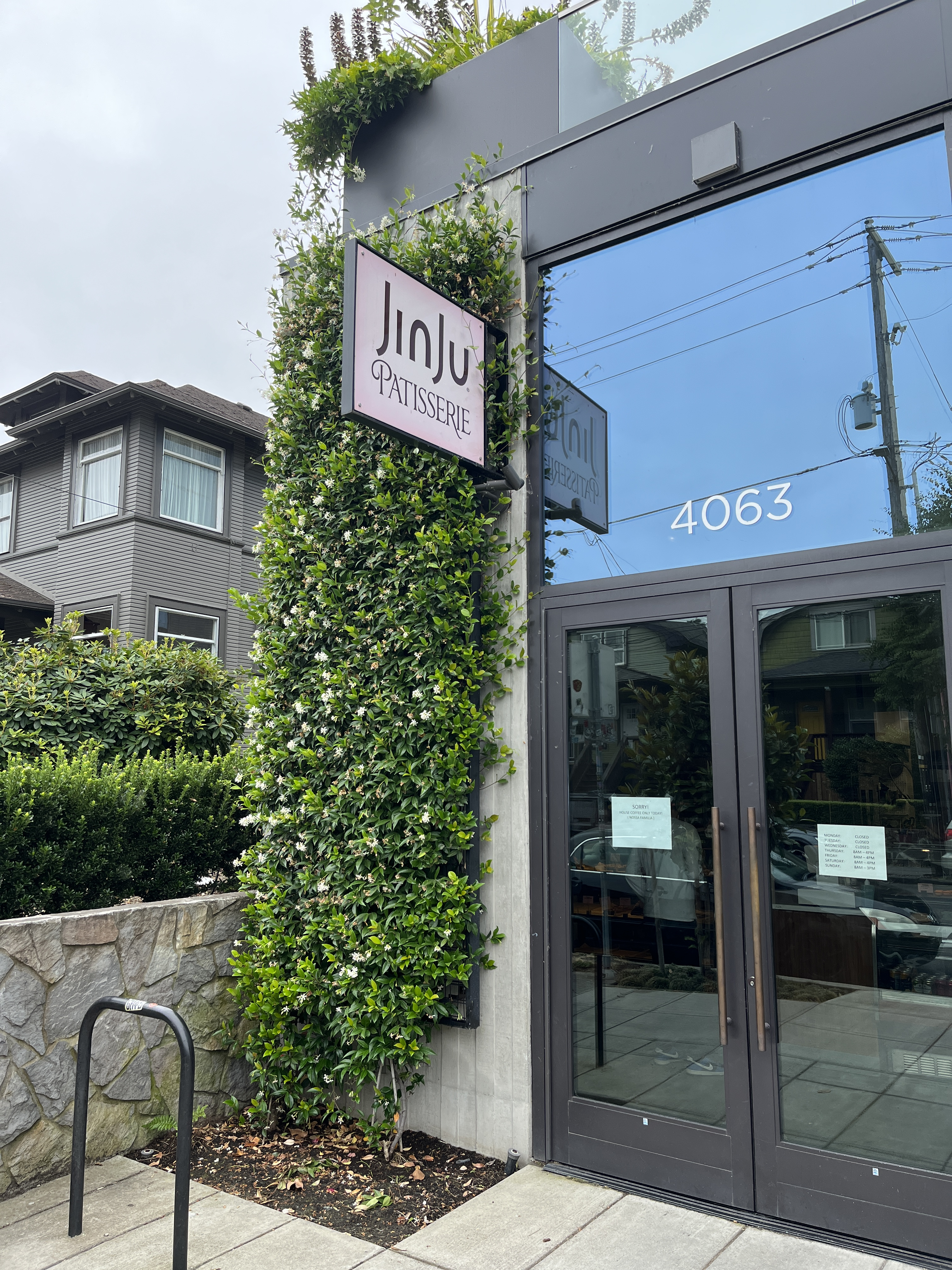
- The bakery's exterior in 2022
- Interactive map of JinJu Patisserie

Restaurant information
- Established: April 8, 2019
- Location: 3494 North Williams Ave, Portland, Multnomah, Oregon, 97227, United States
- Coordinates: 45.54815°N 122.6664°W
- Website: jinjupatisserie.com

JinJu Patisserie is a bakery in Portland, Oregon, United States. Established in 2019, the business operates in the north Portland part of the Boise neighborhood.

== Description ==
The menu includes chocolates and other desserts (including seasonal specials such as cheesecake and pumpkin pie), cookies, croissants and pastries, and hot chocolate. The business has also served "brown-kies", described as a cross between brownies and chocolate chip cookies.

== History ==
The bakery opened on April 8, 2019. In December 2025, the business announced plans to stop operating in its north Portland location on December 28 and was seeking a new space. Kokikoki Bakehouse began operating in the space in March 2026.

== Reception ==
Michael Russell included JinJu in The Oregonian's 2019 overview of Portland's best croissants. Willamette Week included the bakery in a list of "12 things that didn't suck" about 2020. A food writer for the newspaper said:

For aficionados of laminated pastries, JinJu is a precious gem. The best known variation is the croissant, which at JinJu is dark, golden-baked, buttery perfection—if you can get your hands on one before they sell out. But the crown jewel of the lot is the weekend-only gianduja kouign amann, a carmelized sugar-encrusted, crown-shaped pastry with a center core of hazelnut-kissed chocolate cream. It is truly world class. Order it and you might forget for a moment that it's still 2020.

JinJu was a runner-up in the Best Bakery category in Willamette Week's annual 'Best of Portland' readers' poll in 2024. It was a finalist in the same category and won in the Best Sweet Shop / Chocolatier category in the same poll in 2025. In 2021, Katherine Chew Hamilton included JinJu in Portland Monthly's list of "Our Top 6 Chocolate Croissants", and iHeart's Zuri Anderson included the bakery in an overview of Portland's best breakfast restaurants.

Michelle Lopez included the bakery in Eater Portland's overview of "Where to Find Flaky, Crackly Croissants in Portland", and Brooke Jackson-Glidden and Alex Frane included the bakery in an overview of "Where to Find a Real-Deal Breakfast in Portland". In the website's 2022 "Guide to Five Unforgettable Portland Pastries", Natalee Quinn and Jackson-Glidden wrote, "The Vegas tenure of patisserie power couple Kyurim Lee and Jin Caldwell shows in their sliver of a bakery: Every pastry in the case is gorgeous and meticulously constructed, from the heart-shaped yuzu bonbons to the shatteringly flaky croissants. Nothing beats the showstopper that is Jinju’s lemon-raspberry tart, a crown of toasted meringue surrounding a core of silken raspberry-lemon filling, cradled in a buttery pastry crust." Rebecca Roland, Kara Stokes, and Janey Wong included the "brown-kies" in a 2024 list of Portland's best "decadent" cookies. Michelle Lopez and Janey Wong included the business in Eater Portland's 2025 overview of the city's best bakeries. In June 2025, JinJu Patisserie was awarded "Outstanding Bakery" by the James Beard Foundation.

== See also ==
- List of bakeries
