= Mole Mole =

Mexican restaurant in Portland, Oregon, U.S.

- Interactive map of Mole Mole

Restaurant information
- Established: August 2021
- Owner: Brenda Flores
- Food type: Mexican
- Location: Portland, Multnomah, Oregon, United States
- Coordinates: 45.5592°N 122.6423°W
- Website: molemolepdx.com

Mole Mole Mexican Cuisine, or simply Mole Mole, is a Mexican restaurant with two locations in Portland, Oregon, United States. The family owned and operated business began operating in northeast Portland's Concordia neighborhood in 2021, and a second opened in Prost Marketplace in the north Portland part of the Boise neighborhood in 2024. The menu includes burritos, enchiladas, pozole, quesadillas, tacos, agua frescas, and horchata, among other options.

== Description ==
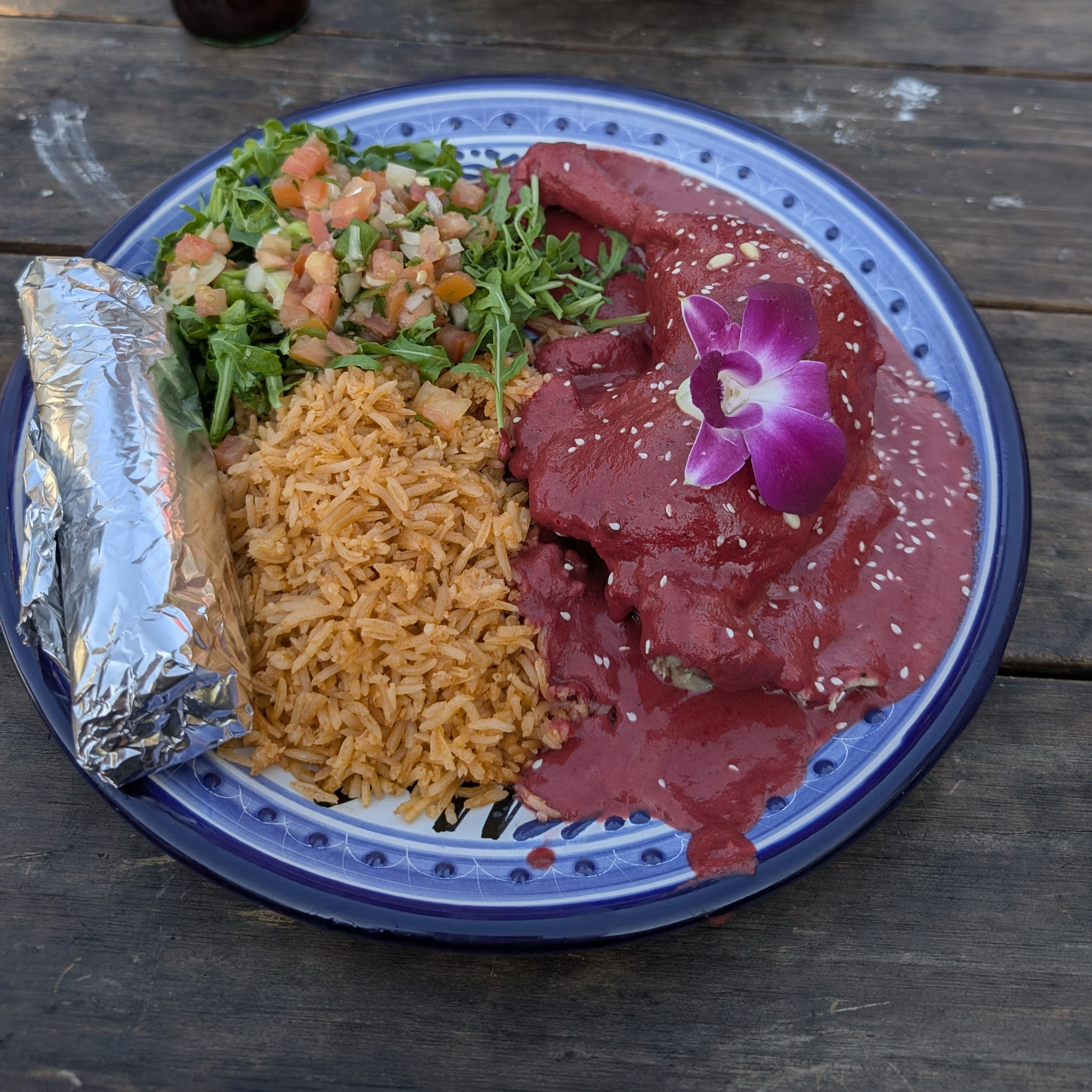
Mole rosa with chicken at the restaurant

The Mexican restaurant Mole Mole operates two food carts in Portland; the original operates in northeast Portland's Concordia neighborhood and second is located in Prost Marketplace in the north Portland part of the Boise neighborhood. The menu has enchiladas, tacos (including quesabirria), tortas, soups, pozole, quesadillas, burritos, and pescado empapelado. The Tres Amigos burrito has asada, pastor, and chicken, as well as beans, rice, sour cream, salsas, and guacamole. One enchilada dish has three varieties of mole. The mole rosa is a pink mole made from beets and walnuts and served with salmon; another variety is mole verde. Among vegan taco fillings are soy curls, soyrizo, tofu, and vegetables. Sides include pico de gallo and rice. Drink options include agua frescas and horchata.

== History ==
Established in August 2021, the business is family owned and operated. Brenda Flores is a co-owner.

In 2024, Mole Mole opened a second location at the food cart pod Prost Marketplace on May 1.

== Reception ==
Michael Russell ranked Mole Mole third in The Oregonian's list of Portland's best new foods carts of 2022. He also included the chicken mole tacos in a list of ten "fantastic" dishes for $10 or less at the new carts. Katherine Chew Hamilton included the business in Portland Monthly's 2022 list of twenty food carts "that define Portland now". Krista Garcia included Mole Mole in The Infatuation's overview of Portland's best food carts. Waz Wu included Mole Mole in Eater Portland's 2023 overview of the city's top food carts for vegan dining. In 2024, the website's Brooke Jackson-Glidden and Nathan Williams included the business a list of recommended restaurants on Alberta Street, and Garcia included Mole Mole in a list of the city's "standout" Mexican eateries. Eater Portland has also included the restaurant in lists of 18 "knockout spots for affordable dining", 38 "essential" eateries, and best affordable restaurants in the city. Writers also included Mole Mole in the website's guide to Portland's "most outstanding" food carts. Katherine Chew Hamilton included the business in Portland Mercury's 2026 list of the city's top twenty food carts.

== See also ==
- Hispanics and Latinos in Portland, Oregon
- List of Mexican restaurants
