= Burger Stevens =

Defunct restaurant in the Portland, Oregon metropolitan area, U.S.

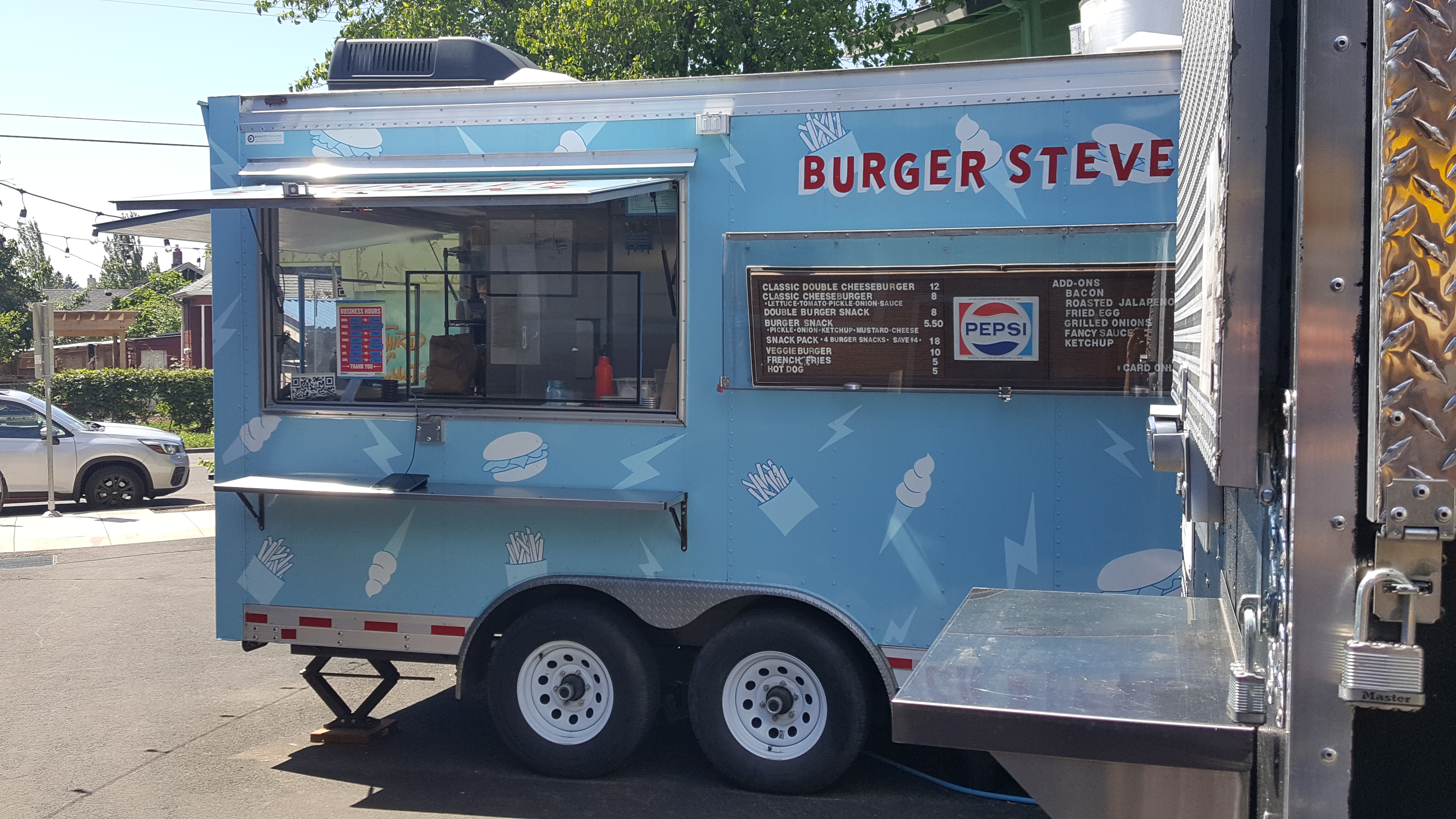
- The food cart at Hinterland Bar and Food Carts, 2022

Restaurant information
- Established: 2016
- Closed: 2024
- Owner: Don Salamone
- Location: Portland, Oregon, United States
- Website: burgerstevens.com

Burger Stevens was a hamburger restaurant with multiple locations in the Portland, Oregon metropolitan area, in the United States. The business garnered a positive reception, operating from 2016 to 2024 in food cart pods and other spaces including Portland's Pioneer Courthouse Square, Prost Marketplace, and Hinterland Bar and Food Carts, as well as Beaverton's BG's Food Cartel.

== History ==
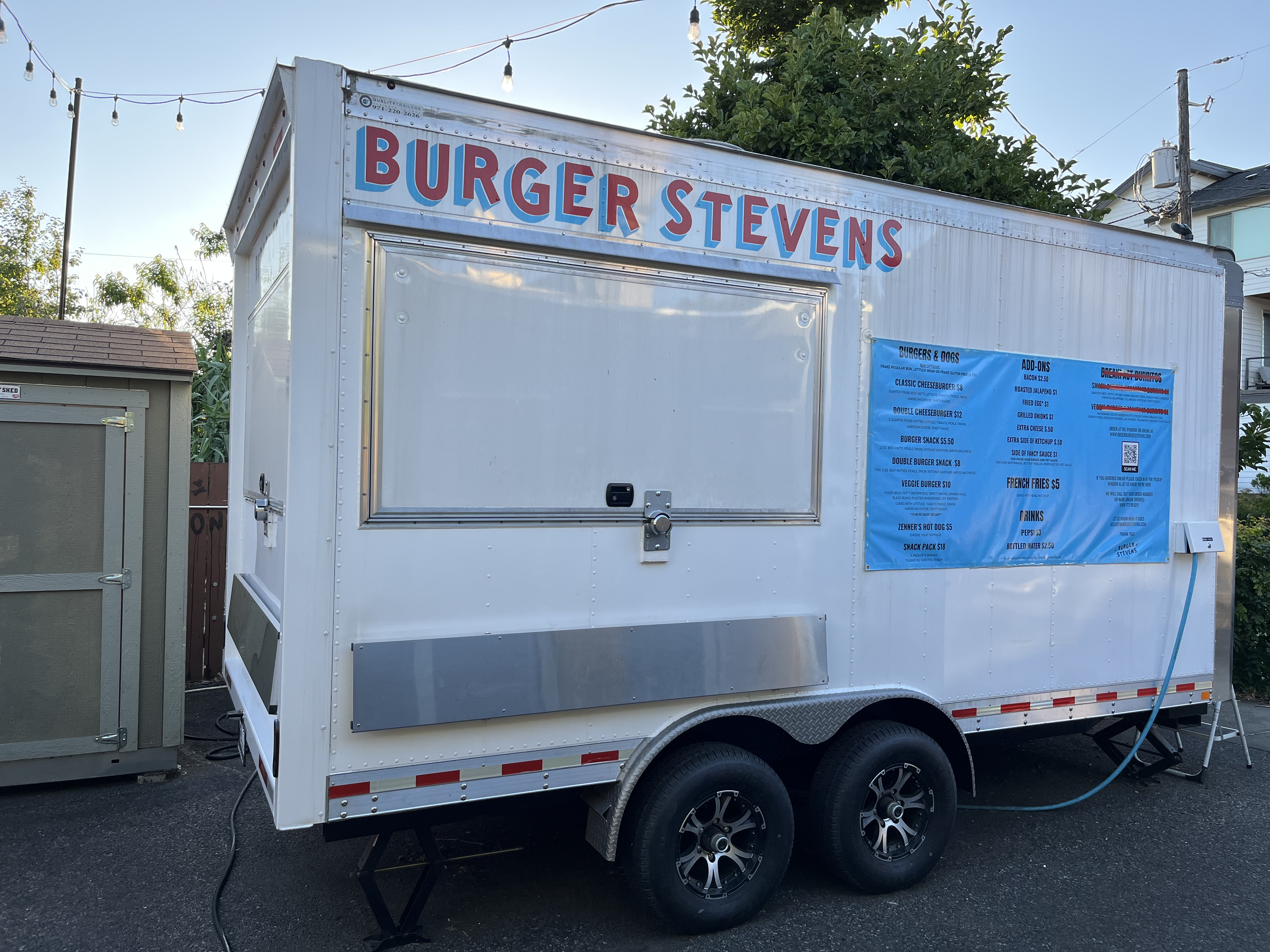
Burger Stevens at Prost Marketplace, in 2022

Burger Stevens was established in 2016. The business operated from a food cart in Hillsdale, Portland, Oregon, and at Pioneer Courthouse Square until the COVID-19 pandemic. In 2022, owner Don Salamone relocated the cart to Prost Marketplace in the north Portland part of the Boise neighborhood. The business also operated from Hinterland Bar and Food Carts in southeast Portland's Mount Tabor neighborhood, as of 2022.

Burger Stevens operated from BG's Food Cartel in Beaverton, as of 2021.

The business closed permanently in 2024.

== Reception ==
In 2019, Willamette Week's Michael Mannheimer recommended Burger Stevens for "the quintessential all-American meal". In 2020, Brooke Jackson-Glidden of Eater Portland said the business offers "what could be Portland's best burger". Michael Russell included Burger Stevens in The Oregonian's list of the 21 "most painful" restaurant and bar closures of 2024.

== See also ==
- List of hamburger restaurants
