= DeNorval Unthank =

American physician and civil rights activist (1899–1977)

Dr. DeNorval Unthank
- Born: December 14, 1899; Allentown, Pennsylvania, U.S.
- Died: September 20, 1977 (aged 77); Portland, Oregon, U.S.
- Occupation: Physician
- Years active: 1926–1970
- Spouse: Thelma Shipman
- Children: 5, including DeNorval Unthank Jr.

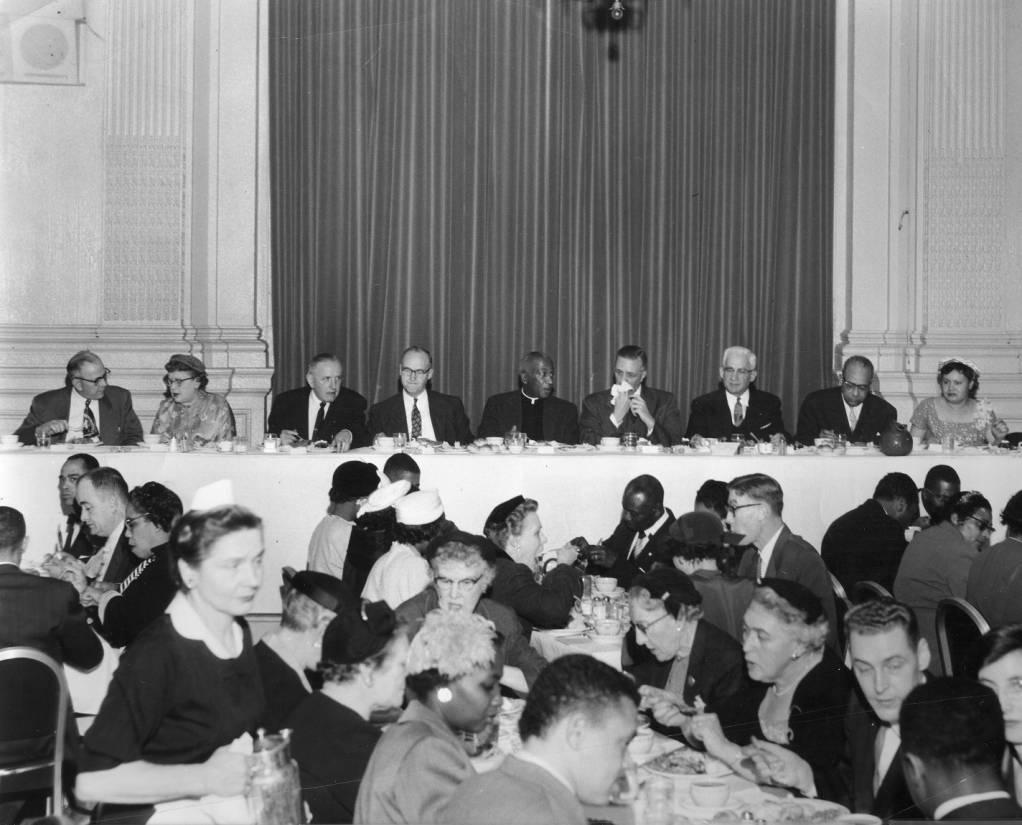
A meeting of the Portland Urban League in 1955; Unthank is seated second from right at the head table.

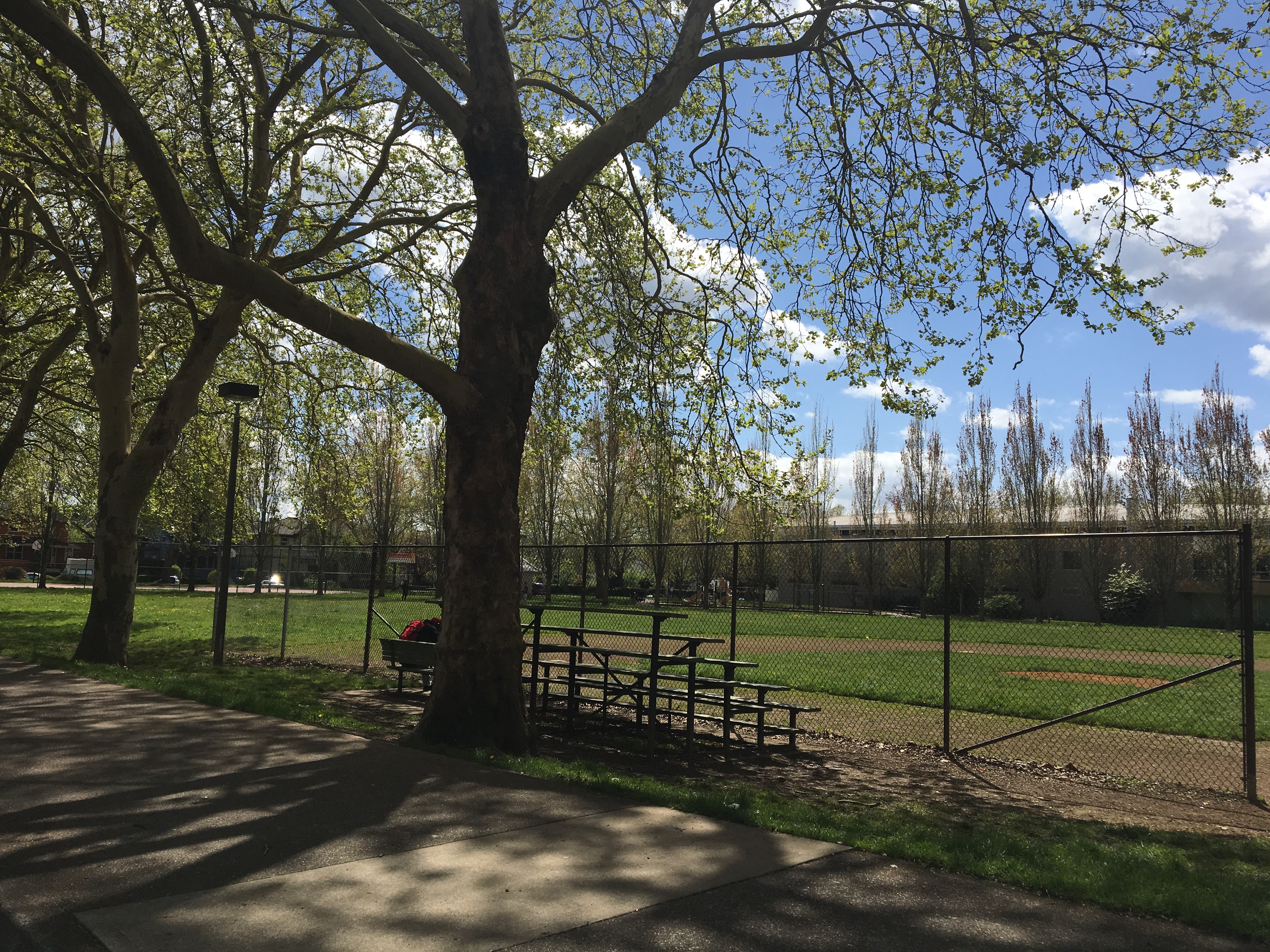
DeNorval Unthank Park in the Boise section of Portland, Oregon, named in Unthank's honor

DeNorval Unthank (December 14, 1899 – September 20, 1977) was an American physician and civil rights activist in Portland, Oregon. Unthank was one of the first black doctors in Oregon and the only black physician operating in Portland during the 1930s. He became the first black member of the City Club of Portland in 1943, and co-founded the Urban League of Portland in 1945.

== Early life and education ==
Unthank was born December 14, 1899, in Allentown, Pennsylvania. He had seven siblings, and his mother died when he was nine. Unable to support him, his father sent him to live with his aunt and uncle in Kansas City. Unthank attended the University of Michigan, and later transferred to the University of Kansas, where he graduated with a Bachelor of Arts degree. In 1926, he received his medical degree from Howard University in Washington, D.C.

== Career ==
Unthank moved to the all-white neighborhood of Westmoreland in Portland, Oregon in 1929. Unthank's family was harassed with threatening phone calls and repeatedly had rocks thrown through the windows of their home, forcing them to move four times before they were able to settle. Unthank was the only Black physician operating in Portland during the 1930s. He became the first Black member of the City Club of Portland in 1943. Unthank cofounded the Urban League of Portland in 1945, and served as president of the Portland NAACP chapter. Unthank moved with his family to the Irvington neighborhood in 1952. He was named Oregon Doctor of the Year in 1958. Four years later, he was named Citizen of the Year by the Portland Chapter of the National Conference of Christians and Jews.

Unthank retired from medical practice in 1970, and served as a medical consultant for the Oregon Workmen's Compensation Board from 1970 until 1976.

== Personal life ==
Unthank and his wife, Thelma Shipman, had five children: DeNorval Jr. (1929–2000), Thomas, James (1938–2018), Thelma (1940–2009), and Lesley. Unthank was a member of Alpha Phi Alpha fraternity.

== Death ==
Unthank died on September 20, 1977, in Portland, Oregon, at age 77.

== Legacy ==
DeNorval Unthank Park, in the neighborhood of Boise, was dedicated to him in 1969. A rededication ceremony was held in 2011. Other namesakes include Unthank Plaza, a senior living facility, and the DeNorval Unthank Health Clinic, also in the Boise neighborhood.
