= Masala Lab PDX =

Defunct restaurant in Portland, Oregon, U.S.

Masala Lab
- Interactive map of Masala Lab

Restaurant information
- Closed: January 26, 2025
- Owner: Deepak Saxena
- Chef: Deepak Saxena
- Food type: Indian; Indian American; Indian fusion; Modern Indian
- Location: 5237 Northeast Martin Luther King Jr. Boulevard, Portland, Multnomah, Oregon, 97211, United States
- Coordinates: 45.5612°N 122.6619°W

Masala Lab PDX (also known as Masala Lab + Market, or simply Masala Lab) was an Indian restaurant and former commissary kitchen in Portland, Oregon. Chef and owner Deepak Saxena operated the business in northeast Portland's King neighborhood, serving gluten-free fusion cuisine such as fritters, sandwiches with Indian ingredients, and shrimp and grits. Masala Lab garnered a generally positive reception.

The restaurant closed permanently in January 2025.

== Description ==
The restaurant Masala Lab operated in northeast Portland's King neighborhood. It served Indian breakfast food as well as Indian interpretations of "classic" American cuisine, according to Willamette Week. Brooke Jackson-Glidden and other Eater Portland writers described Masala Lab as an Indian American restaurant. Fodor's said the restaurant had "colorful purple-and-green color scheme, soaring ceilings with exposed air ducts, and lots of hanging plants", and served a "modern mashup of Indian cuisine and comfort brunch fare".

The gluten-free menu included: a BLT with ghee, tomato chutney, and bacon; shrimp and grits with coconut milk polenta and shrimp tikka mole; and a fritter with chicken or mushrooms. The kitchari had rice dal with cabbage, salad, and pickled eggs. Masala Lab also served chaat hash, saagshuka, scrambled egg bowls with burrata, and cocktails, including a chai hot toddy. The lunch menu had sandwiches made with New Cascadia bread and served with dal, a rotating soup, bean salad, or vadouvan pasta salad, as well as other salads and snacks. A tuna fish sandwich called the Tandoori Tuna had tuna from the Oregon Coast, poached in coconut milk and mustard oil. Another sandwich on the menu had saag paneer and Gorge Greens with turmeric mustard dressing. The Masala Mary, a version of a Bloody Mary, had garam masala green chutney, amchoor, Kashmiri red chile, and a cumin rim.

== History ==
Masala Lab PDX initially operated as a commissary kitchen. It hosted Desi PDX as a pop-up restaurant.

In July 2022, Masala Lab + Market relocated to a brick and mortar space on Northeast Martin Luther King Jr. Boulevard, in the space that previously housed Horn of Africa. In November, chef and owner Deepak Saxena developed and launched a lunch menu with sandwiches, salads, and other snacks.

In December 2022, Saxena partnered with chef Jeremy Fong to serve a Chinese-fusion, family-style Christmas dinner with samosa egg rolls, shrimp-smeared eggplant, and Bengali five-spice fried rice. In 2023, the restaurant had soy-free vegan Christmas dinner meal kits with masala-spiced stuffing, black bean tamale pie, coconut and sweet potato soup, and a winter salad. Cornish hen and pork loin were also available to diners.

The restaurant closed permanently on January 26, 2025. The Balkan restaurant Alma later operated in the space.

== Reception ==
Fodor's said Masala Lab's food "isn't quite like anything even offbeat Portland has ever seen before". In 2022, Michael Russell included Masala Lab in The Oregonian's list of Portland's 25 best new restaurants, and said the business offered the city's best Indian fusion brunch. He called the restaurant "inventive" in 2023.

Zoe Baillargeon and Janey Wong included the Masala Lab in Eater Portland's 2024 overview of recommended eateries for a "real-deal" breakfast in the city, writing: "Masala Lab may serve some of the most intricate breakfast dishes in town, with nuanced layers of flavor and texture." Sararosa Davies included the business in the website's 2024 overview of Portland's "knockout" gluten-free restaurants and bakeries.

== See also ==
- List of defunct restaurants of the United States
- List of Indian restaurants
