= Matt's BBQ =

Barbecue restaurant in Portland, Oregon, U.S.

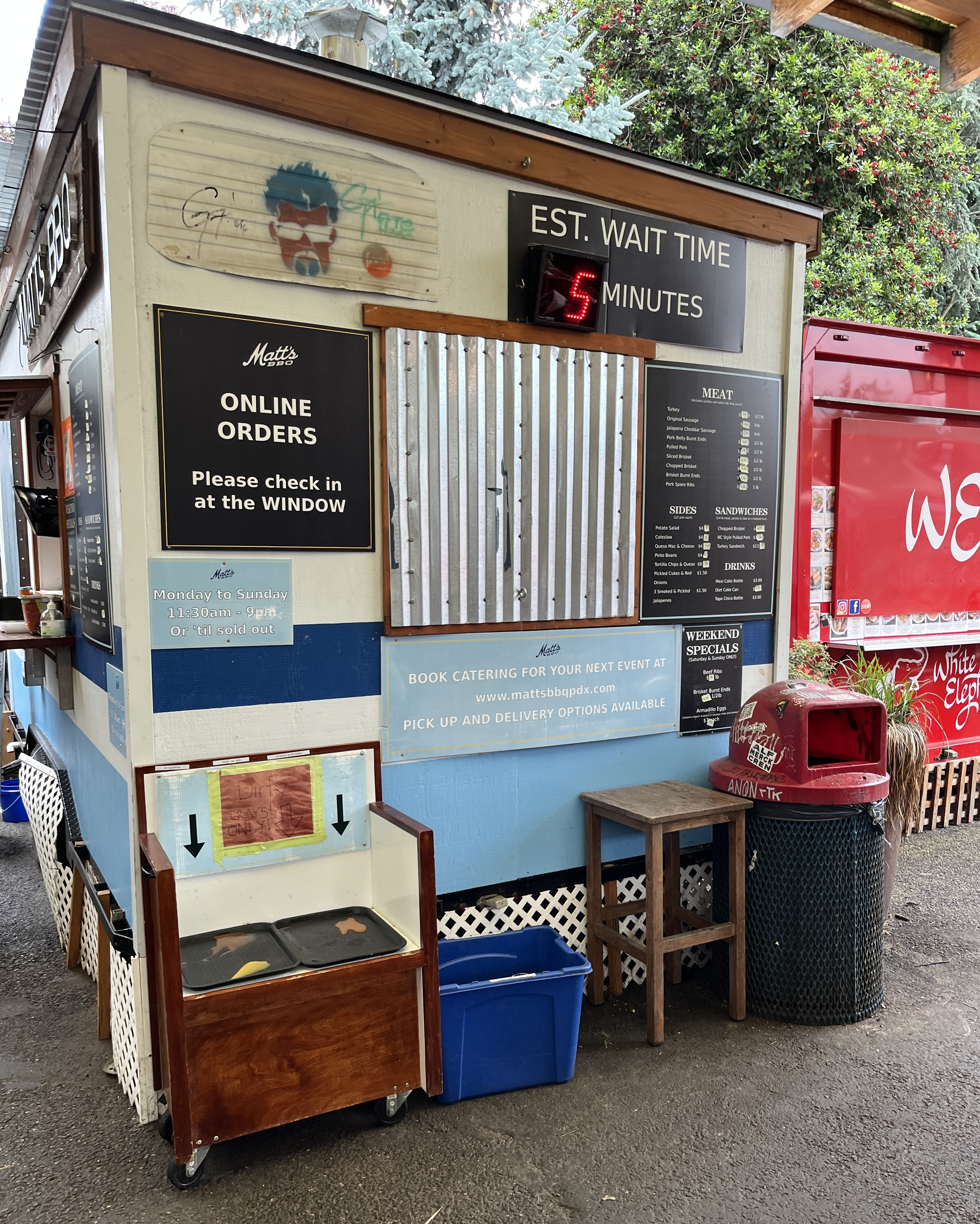
- Food cart at Prost Marketplace, 2025
- Interactive map of Matt's BBQ

Restaurant information
- Food type: Barbecue
- Location: Portland, Oregon, United States
- Coordinates: 45.55435°N 122.67573°W
- Website: mattsbbqpdx.com

Matt's BBQ is a barbecue restaurant in Portland, Oregon's Boise neighborhood, in the United States. The business has also operated in Beaverton. It has been featured on the Food Network series Diners, Drive-Ins and Dives. Sibling restaurant Matt's BBQ Tacos, also located in Portland, opened in 2019.

== History ==
In 2015, Matt Vicedomini opened his first food cart on Northeast Martin Luther King Jr. Boulevard. Matt's BBQ and its sibling restaurant Matt's BBQ Tacos closed temporarily in March 2020, during the COVID-19 pandemic. Limited operations were restored in April.

In 2021, Matt's BBQ announced plans to operate a second location in Beaverton. The business has been featured on the Food Network series Diners, Drive-Ins and Dives.

== Reception ==
In 2017, Martin Cizmar of Willamette Week wrote, "Fact: Matt's BBQ Has the Best Brisket and Ribs in Portland". Matt's BBQ won in the Best Barbecue category of the newspaper's annual 'Best of Portland' readers' poll in 2022 and 2024. Michael Russell included the business in The Oregonian's 2022 "ultimate guide" to the 30 best restaurants in Central Beaverton. Matt's BBQ was included in Texas Monthly's 2024 list of the 53 best Texas-style barbecue eateries in the nation. Ron Scott included the business in Eater Portland's 2025 overview of the city's best barbecue establishments.

== See also ==
- Barbecue in the United States
- List of barbecue restaurants
- List of Diners, Drive-Ins and Dives episodes
