= Desi PDX =

Indian restaurant in Portland, Oregon, U.S.

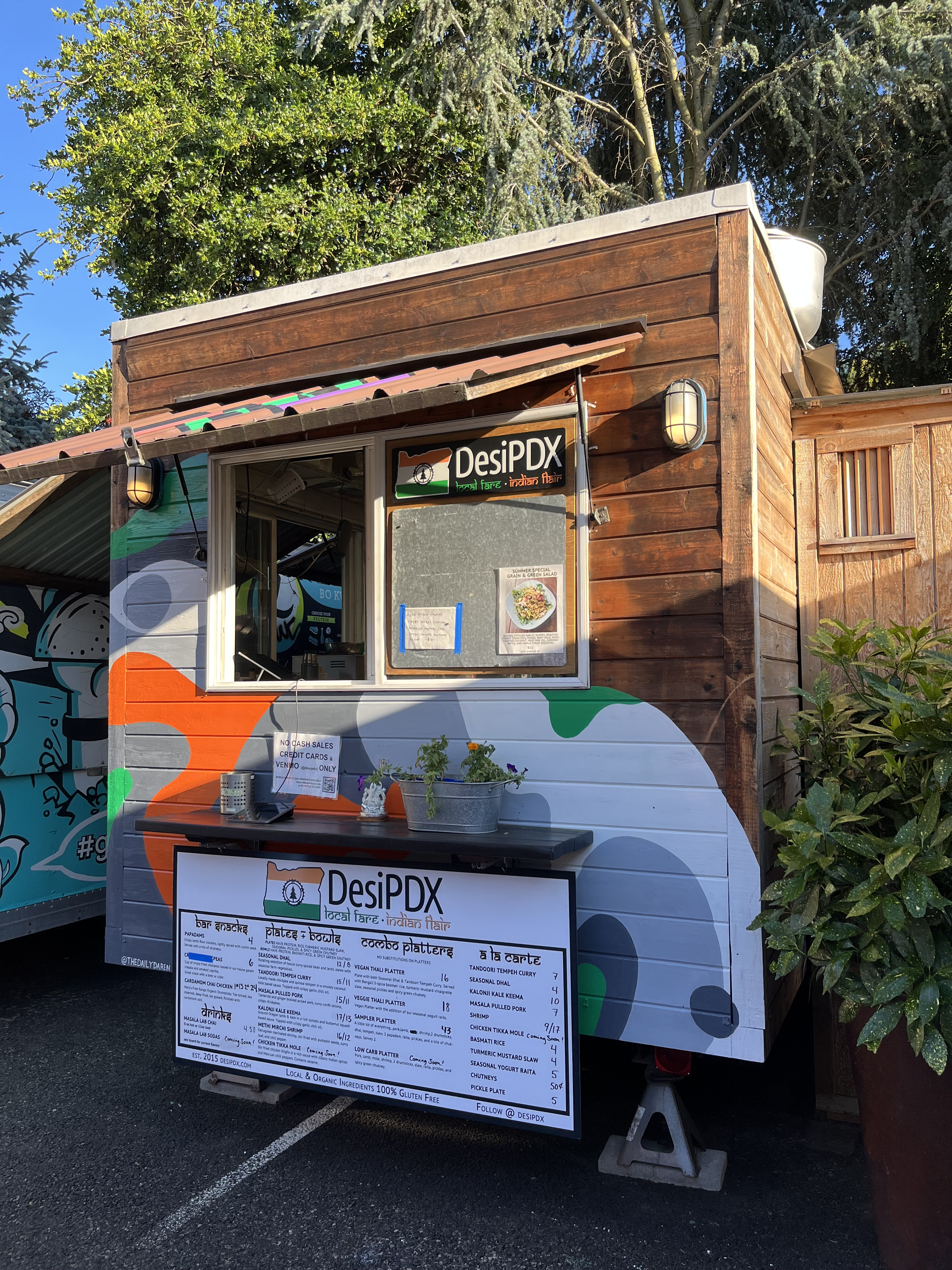
- Food cart at Prost Marketplace, 2022
- Interactive map of Desi PDX

Restaurant information
- Established: 2015
- Owner: Deepak Saxena
- Food type: Indian; Indian fusion
- Location: Portland, Multnomah, Oregon, United States
- Coordinates: 45.5544°N 122.6757°W
- Website: desipdx.com

Desi PDX, also known as DesiPDX or simply Desi, is an Indian restaurant in Portland, Oregon. Established in 2015, the business operates from a food cart.

== Description ==
Desi PDX serves Indian cuisine from a food cart in a pod called ModHaus at the intersection of 38th and Division in southeast Portland. Previously, the cart operated at Prost Marketplace, in the north Portland part of the Eliot neighborhood.

Fodor's and Michael Russell of The Oregonian have described the menu as "Indian fusion". The Portland Mercury's Ned Lannamann called Desi PDX an "Indian-themed food cart" with "Indian dishes done Northwest style—or Northwest dishes done Indian style, depending on your viewpoint". He also wrote, "Virtually everything is gluten-free (and dairy-free, except for the creamy, cooling raita that comes on the side), and there are vegan options aplenty on their terrific menu of complex, intricately spiced fare." The cart has dark wood siding and strokes of green and orange paint.

According to Waz Wu of Eater Portland, the business offers "Indian flair with local produce to create a lively gluten-free menu of small bites, salads, and curries. The vegetables change, depending on what's in season, but vegans can always count on the stunning vegan thali, which includes a tandoori chickpea tempeh curry, cabbage slaw with turmeric-mustard vinaigrette, and a green chutney with a kick." The menu has included a tamarind- and ginger-braised pulled pork sandwich served with curry confit onions, chickpeas, and basmati, as well as cardamom chai chicken and rice with fenugreek-seasoned shrimp and tomato-and-lamb stew.

== History ==
Desi PDX was established in 2015. The business is owned by Deepak Saxena. It operated from the Cubby Hole pod, which closed in 2017.

The business operated a pop-up out of the commissary kitchen Masala Lab PDX, as of early 2022. For Valentine's Day, Desi PDX offered a dinner with chickpea-miso masala lamb shank or vegan tempeh vindaloo as well as radicchio salad with cabbage, roasted Brussels sprouts, candied coriander, and pomegranate vinaigrette, tandoori spiced potatoes with roasted cauliflower sauce and pickled peas, basmati with black cardamom, and citrus cake.

Desi PDX operates at the food cart pod ModHaus at the intersection of 38th and Division in southeast Portland. The business also caters large events.

== Reception ==
Desi PDX was included in Yelp's 2016 list of Portland's top 40 food carts. In 2017, Eater Portland's Mattie John Bamman said Desi PDX was "one of the hottest food carts in the city". Ned Lannamann included the restaurant in the Portland Mercury's 2019 list of fifty of the city's best multi-cultural eateries, in which he described the business as "unique and excellent". Waz Wu included Desi PDX in Eater Portland's 2021 overview of restaurants with "standout" vegan curries in the city. The website's Ron Scott and Janey Wong included the business in 2021 and 2022 overviews of recommended establishments for "exceptional" Indian cuisine in Portland. In 2025, Desi PDX was included in the website's overviews of Portland's best Indian food, best gluten-free eateries, and best food carts.

== See also ==
- List of Indian restaurants
