= Alma (Portland restaurant) =

Balkan restaurant in Portland, Oregon, U.S.

- Interactive map of Alma

Restaurant information
- Owner: Vedran Jordan
- Chef: Vedran Jordan
- Food type: Balkan
- Location: 5237 Northeast Martin Luther King Jr. Boulevard, Portland, Multnomah, Oregon, 97211, United States
- Coordinates: 45.5613°N 122.6619°W
- Website: almapdx.com

Alma is a Balkan restaurant in Portland, Oregon, United States. Originally a pop-up restaurant, the business has operated in a brick and mortar space in northeast Portland's King neighborhood since June 2025.

== Description ==
Alma is a Balkan restaurant on Martin Luther King Jr. Boulevard in northeast Portland's King neighborhood. According to The Oregonian, the tapas restaurant mixes Mediterranean flavors and Pacific Northwest ingredients. Eater Portland has described Alma as the city's first "upscale" Balkan restaurant. The menu includes branzino, clams, lamb, octopus with muhamarra, roasted eggplant, and squid. Drink options include cocktails and wines.

== History ==
The restaurant opened on June 13, 2025, in the space that previously housed Masala Lab PDX. Alma previously operated as a pop-up restaurant and was known as Balkan Nights. Vedran Jordan is the chef and owner. The business participated in Portland's first Fried Chicken Week in 2025.

== Reception ==
Alma ranked third in The Oregonian's annual Readers Choice Awards for 2025.
