= Hinterland Bar and Food Carts =

Bar and food cart pod in Portland, Oregon, U.S.

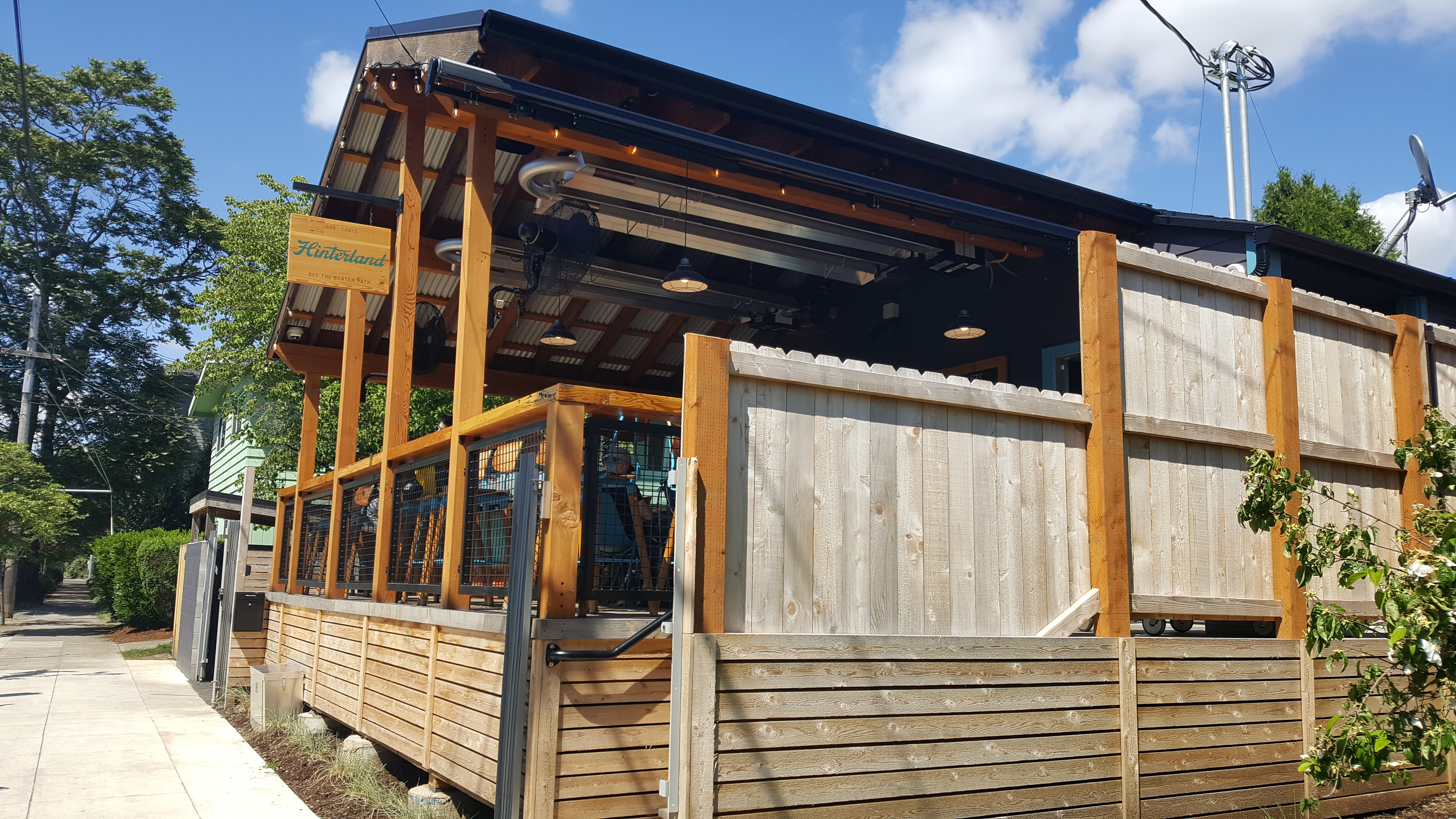
- The bar and food pod's exterior, 2022
- Interactive map of Hinterland Bar and Food Carts

Restaurant information
- Location: Portland, Oregon, United States
- Coordinates: 45°30′25.5″N 122°36′40″W
- Website: hinterlandpdx.com

Hinterland Bar and Food Carts, or simply Hinterland, is a bar and food cart pod in southeast Portland, Oregon, United States.

== History ==
The pod opened in January 2022 and includes several food carts, including Burger Stevens, Hunker Down, La Taquiza Vegana, Matt's BBQ Tacos, Poppyseed, and Third Culture Kitchen. Oathbreaker Pie began operating in the pod in November 2024.
