= Nico's Ice Cream =

Ice cream company based in Portland, Oregon, U.S.

Restaurant information
- Established: 2021
- Owners: Nico Vergara; Kelton Stone
- Food type: Ice cream
- Location: Oregon; California, United States

Nico's Ice Cream is an ice cream company based in Portland, Oregon, United States. Founder Nico Vergara launched the business in 2021, initially operating as a food cart and via pop-ups. After operating in Prost Marketplace, Vergara opened the first brick and mortar shop in northeast Portland's Cully neighborhood in November 2021 followed by a second in the Vernon neighborhood in November 2022. In 2024, the business expanded to California, opening shops in Monterey Bay and Santa Cruz.

Vergara and Kelton Stone are co-owners. Nico's has garnered a positive reception. Half pints of Nico's Ice Cream are available at approximately 100 locations in Oregon and Washington.

== Description ==
Nico's Ice Cream specializes in New Zealand-style soft serve ice cream. Fruit options include blueberries, kiwi, mango (on "Tropical Thursday"), marionberries, raspberries, and strawberries. Nico's has used the Tillamook and Umpqua ice cream brands. Toppings include chamoy, coconut flakes, graham cracker, rainbow sprinkles, and tajin seasoning.

The shop on Killingsworth Street in northeast Portland, Oregon's Vernon neighborhood, has colorful artwork and a neon sign. The company has a cartoon logo. Half pints of Nico's were initially available at a limited number of locations, but were available at approximately 100 locations in Oregon and Washington in 2023.

== History ==
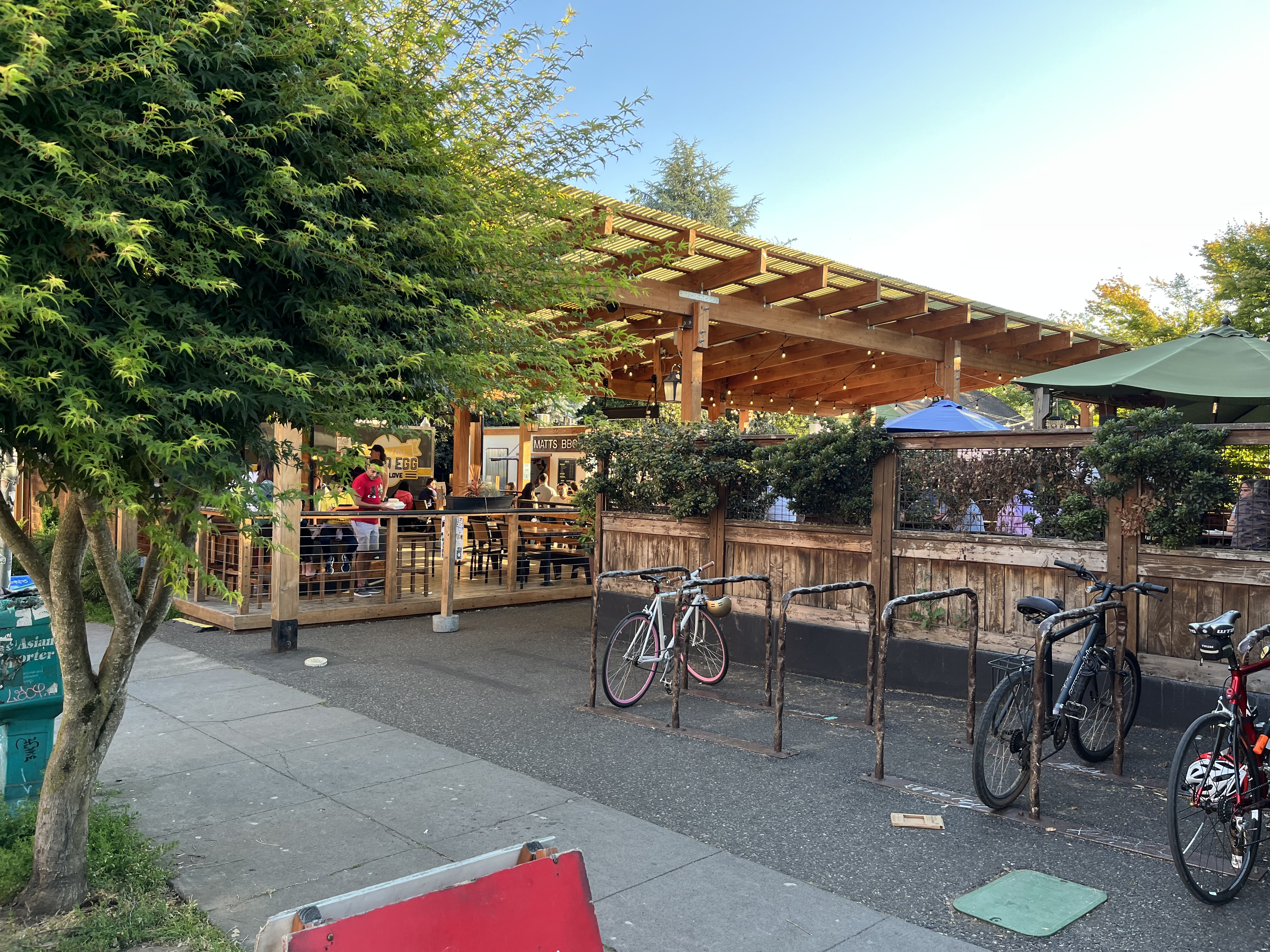
Nico's Ice cream has operated as a food cart at Prost Marketplace (pictured in 2022)

The company was founded by Nico Vergara, who started with a food cart in Portland in 2021. According to CNBC, he started the business using money he earned investing in the stock market. Since then, Nico's Ice Cream has operated two brick and mortar shops in Portland, as well as Monterey Bay and Santa Cruz.

Before the first shop, Vergara operated via pop-ups and a food cart at Prost Marketplace. In September 2021, he confirmed plans to open a shop on Fremont Street in northeast Portland's Cully neighborhood in November. A second location followed on Killingsworth Street on November 5, 2022. The Monterey Bay and Santa Cruz locations opened in October and November 2024, respectively. Kelton Stone is a co-owner.

In 2023, the business hid a golden ticket in a half pint in one of the Portland shops, offering free ice cream for a year. Nico's also partnered with the Portland Pickles to offer a pickle-flavored ice cream at Walker Stadium. It was also a vendor at the Waterfront Blues Festival in 2023. In 2024, Nico's was a vendor at a warehouse sale by Powell's Books.

== Reception ==
Nico's ranked fourth in the best ice cream category of The Oregonian's Readers Choice Awards in 2024.

== See also ==
- List of ice cream brands
- List of ice cream parlor chains
- List of restaurant chains in the United States
