= Matt's BBQ Tacos =

Restaurant in Portland, Oregon, U.S.

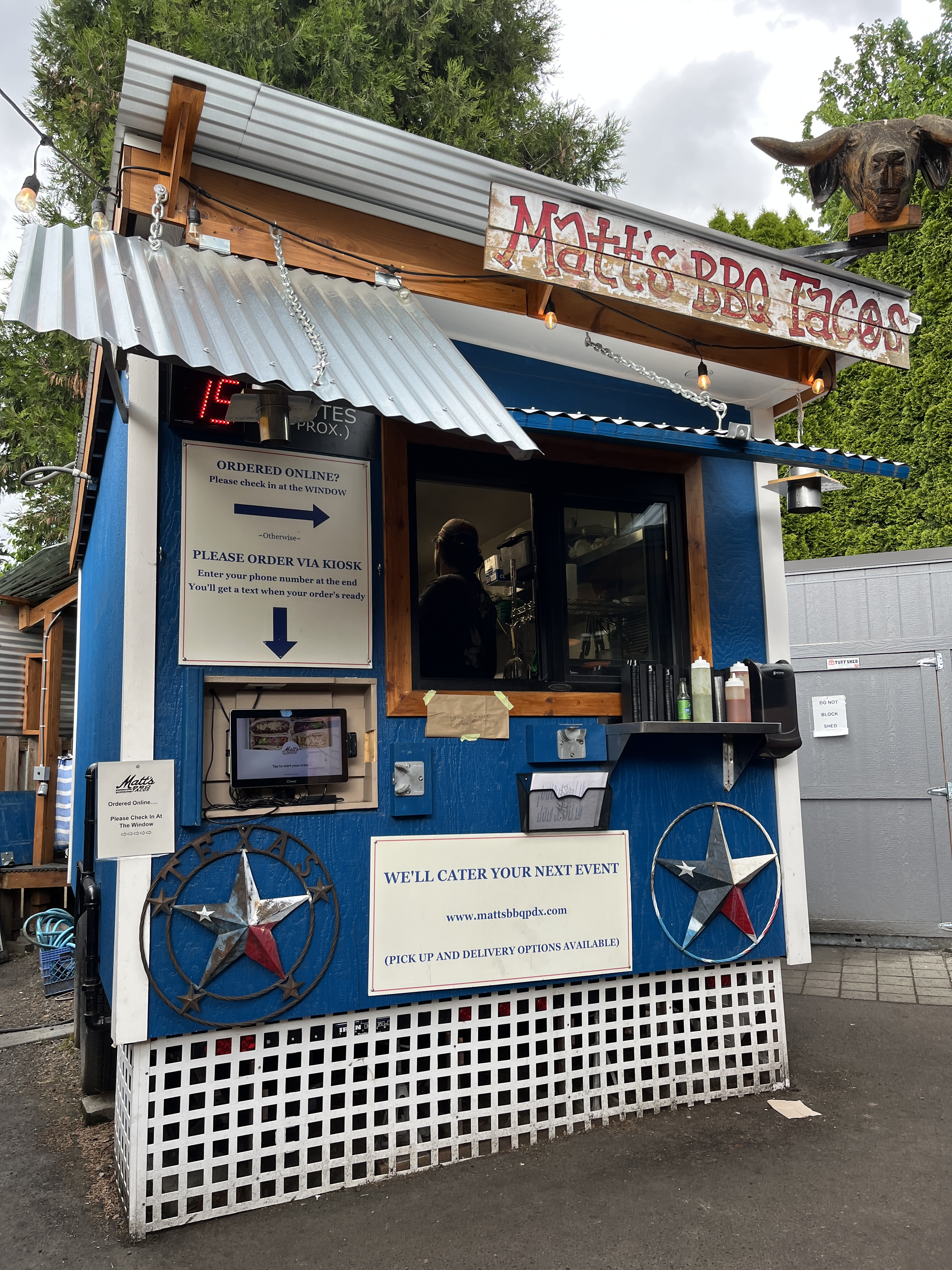
- The food cart at Hinterland Bar and Food Carts, 2025
- Interactive map of Matt's BBQ Tacos

Restaurant information
- Food type: Barbecue; Mexican
- Location: Portland, Multnomah, Oregon, United States
- Coordinates: 45.5071°N 122.6111°W

Matt's BBQ Tacos is a barbecue and Mexican restaurant in Portland, Oregon, United States.

== Description ==
Matt's BBQ Tacos operates in northeast Portland's Concordia neighborhood. It serves barbecue and Mexican cuisine. The menu includes breakfast tacos.

== History ==
Matt's BBQ Tacos, a sibling restaurant to Matt's BBQ, opened the 2019. Matt's BBQ Tacos initially operated as a food cart and relocated to Northeast Alberta Street. It began operating as a brick and mortar restaurant in November 2022.

Matt's BBQ Tacos was featured on the Netflix series Street Food in 2022.

== Reception ==
Matt's BBQ Tacos was named The Oregonian's 2019 Cart of the Year, and was included in The Infatuation's 2024 list of Portland's best restaurants. The business was a finalist in the Best Taco category of Willamette Week's annual 'Best of Portland' readers' poll in 2025 and 2026. Matt's BBQ Tacos placed fifth for the best tacos in the Portland metropolitan area in The Oregonian's Readers Choice Awards in 2026.

== See also ==
- Barbecue in the United States
- List of barbecue restaurants
- List of Mexican restaurants
