= Frederic Stanley Dunn =

American classical scholar and Ku Klux Klan leader

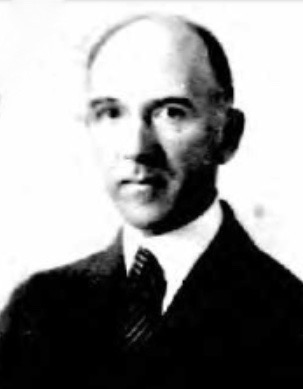
- Passport photo, 1918
- Born: August 3, 1872; Eugene, Oregon
- Died: January 7, 1937 (aged 64); Eugene, Oregon
- Occupation: Professor of Classics
- Known for: Scholarship on Julius Caesar and Roman coins; "Exalted Cyclops" of Eugene Klan No. 3, a Ku Klux Klan klavern

Academic background
- Education: Harvard University

Academic work
- Discipline: Classics: Greek and Latin

Frederic "Freddie" Stanley Dunn (Note: The spelling of his name varies; University of Oregon sources use the name "Frederick S. Dunn".) (August 3, 1872 – January 7, 1937) was an American scholar of classical studies on the faculty of the University of Oregon (UO), and a Ku Klux Klan leader.

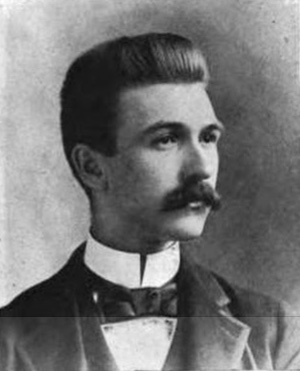
Harvard graduation photo, 1894

== Early life and education ==
Born in Eugene, Oregon, on August 3, 1872, Dunn was the son of Francis Berrian Dunn and Christiann Cecilia (née Christian) Dunn. He was on the roll of honor in 1879 for being "neither absent nor tardy during the month." He received A.B. degrees from UO (1892) and Harvard University (1894); he earned A.M. degrees from UO (1898) and Harvard (1903).

On Nov 27 1895, he married Anna Maude Matthews in Carlton, Oregon. The couple had two children, Dorothy Gertrude, and Frederic Berrian.

== Career ==
From 1895 to 1898, Dunn was a professor of Greek and Latin at Willamette University. In the summer of 1898 he joined the faculty at the University of Oregon as an assistant professor of Latin. He became a full professor, at age 26, in 1898 upon the death of the senior faculty member, Prof. John Wesley Johnson.

He took a leave of absence in 1902 and 1903 to accept the Austin Teaching Fellowship at Harvard while completing his A.M. degree. According to historians David Alan Johnson, Quintard Taylor and Marsha Weisiger, in their 2016 report to the university:

Dunn resumed teaching duties at the University of Oregon and soon developed a regional and eventually national reputation as a classics scholar and over the course of his career published over 70 articles in scholarly journals, newspapers, and magazines... According to contemporary observers Dunn quickly became one of the best known university professors in the classics on the Pacific coast.

By 1921 he was head of the Latin Department at the University of Oregon.

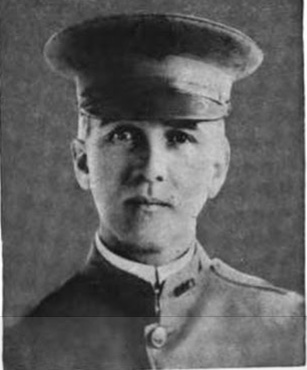
U.S. Army officer, 1919

== Community and military service ==
Outside of academy, Dunn was active in the Masonic Order. In 1905 he was elected worthy patron in the Order of the Eastern Star. In 1915 he was elected illustrious grand marshal in the Order of Royal and Select Masters. In 1916 he was elected grand orator in the Royal Arch Masons. In 1918 he was elected principal conductor of work in the Order of Royal and Select Masons. In 1923 he was elected Second Guard of the Knights Templar.

In 1896 he was elected president of the Epworth League. He was a secretary in the Salem Choral Society, Native Sons organization in Oregon and the Epworth League and the Classical Association of the Pacific Northwest. In 1912 he resigned from his position as vice professor in the YMCA. In 1914 he was elected President of the Department of Foreign Language in the Oregon State Teacher's Association. In 1917 he was elected vice-president of the Eugene Round Table Club. In 1925 he was elected vice-president and in 1935 he was named president of the northern section of the Classical Association of the Pacific States.

Dunn served as a lieutenant in the U.S. Army towards the end of World War I, but did not see combat service. His military career began by drilling with students on the university campus, and he eventually became an assistant chief of staff for the Oregon training camp. In 1919, when he was 46 years old, he was ordered to Italy to serve with the Education Department of the Y.M.C.A. In April 1920 the Sons of the American Revolution awarded him a medal for his service in the war.

== Ku Klux Klan ==
Dunn was the leader, or "Exalted Cyclops", of Eugene Klan No. 3, a Ku Klux Klan group ("klavern"). In the early 1920s the Klan was particularly powerful in Oregon, with some 35,000 members out of a population of 780,000.

The Klan was very active in Eugene, where it had some success in removing Catholics from public office and teaching positions. In 1924, "on the day the National Democratic Party debated the anti-Klan plank during the national presidential campaign", Eugene residents witnessed more than 400 Klansmen and -women parading to Skinner Butte, where they burned a cross as part of an initiation ritual. Dunn's membership was known at the University of Oregon, where the Klan also agitated, by 1922.

== Legacy ==
Dunn retired in 1935, having headed the Classics department for most of his 37-year tenure. He died on January 7, 1937. The university named a dormitory in his honor, part of the Hamilton Complex built in 1961, "Dunn Hall".

Demands by the Black Student Task Force in November 2015 led University President Michael Schill to commission three historians to report on racist beliefs and the Klan affiliation of Dunn, as well as the pro-slavery position of Matthew Deady, the first president of the university's board of regents, after whom Deady Hall was named. In September 2016, following the report by Johnson, Taylor, and Weisiger on Dunn's history as a Klan leader, the University of Oregon removed Dunn's name from "Dunn Hall". The Board of Trustees approved a resolution that began,

Whereas, Mr. Frederick S. Dunn was the head of an organization that supported racism, persecution and violence against Oregonians because of the color of their skin and religious beliefs; Whereas, because of his egregious actions and his leadership within the Ku Klux Klan, the university recommends removal of his name from the building with which it is associated...

In 2017, the University Board renamed the dormitory after DeNorval Unthank Jr., a professor of architecture at the University of Oregon and the first African-American to earn an architecture degree at the university.
