= DeNorval Unthank Jr. =

American architect and teacher

- Born: October 27, 1929; Kansas City, Missouri, U.S.
- Died: November 2, 2000 (aged 71); Eugene, Oregon, U.S.
- Occupation: Architect
- Years active: 1952–2000
- Spouses: Doris (Debbie) Burgess; Jill Coxon
- Children: 5

DeNorval Unthank Jr. (October 27, 1929 – November 2, 2000) was an American architect. In 1951 he was the first black man to earn an architecture degree from the University of Oregon (UO). Unthank worked on the courthouse in Lane County, Oregon; McKenzie Hall (formerly the UO School of Law building); and Kennedy Junior Middle School in Eugene, Oregon. He is the eponym of Unthank Hall at UO.

== Personal life and education ==
DeNorval Unthank Jr. was born in Kansas City, Missouri, on October 27, 1929, to Dr. DeNorval Unthank Sr., and Thelma Shipman Unthank. Shortly after he was born, the family moved to the Pacific Northwest, where his father served as one of Portland's first African American physicians, and was a co-founder of the Portland Urban League. In 1946 Unthank Jr. graduated from Franklin High School. He studied for two years at Howard University before returning to Oregon to attend the University of Oregon.

Unthank met Doris (Debbie) Burgess in 1951at the University of Oregon. She was a white student, a member of Gamma Phi Beta sorority. In May 1951, some men burned a cross on the sorority's lawn, and she was pressured to leave the sorority. Following Unthank's graduation from the School of Architecture, he and Burgess married on July 7, 1951, in the state of Washington, because interracial marriage was illegal in Oregon. They divorced in 1972.

Unthank later married Jill Coxon. He had five children: Peter, Blaire, Amy, Libby, and Melissa.

Unthank died on November 2, 2000, of kidney cancer.

== Career ==
From 1952 to 1955, Unthank designed and built houses with Dick Chambers, who later started Chambers Construction Co. in Eugene. In 1955, Unthank began working for Wilmsen Endicott Architects. In 1960, he became a partner of the firm Wilmsen, Endicott and Unthank, Architects. In 1968, Unthank joined with Otto Poticha and Grant Seder in the firm of Unthank Seder Poticha Architects. By 1985, the firm also included Ed Waterbury, one of his former students. Unthank "designed schools, public buildings and business facilities around the state", including some in the Eugene area, including J.F. Kennedy Junior High School, and Springfield's Thurston High School. From 1993-98, the firm was known as Unthank Waterbury.

He served as an architecture professor at UO from 1965 to 1980.

== Awards and legacy ==
In 1980, following twenty individual AIA awards, he was named a Fellow of the American Institute of Architects, "recognizing his design work on the Lane County Courthouse, the former UO Law School, Central Oregon Community College campus buildings in Bend, the U.S. Consulate Quarters in Fukuoka, Japan, and numerous banks, professional offices, churches, and private residences around the state of Oregon".

In June 2015 his name was installed in Lawrence Hall at UO, and the University announced a US$5000 annual "Faculty Excellence Award" to support architecture faculty teaching and research.

In June 2017, the University of Oregon honored Unthank by renaming a dormitory after him, "Unthank Hall". The building had previously been named after the Ku Klux Klan leader Frederic Stanley Dunn.

In May 2021, the University of Oregon Board of Trustees, at the recommendation of UO President Michael Schill, approved a transfer of the name Unthank Hall to the new dormitory building set to open in August 2021.
