= Paxton Gate =

American company

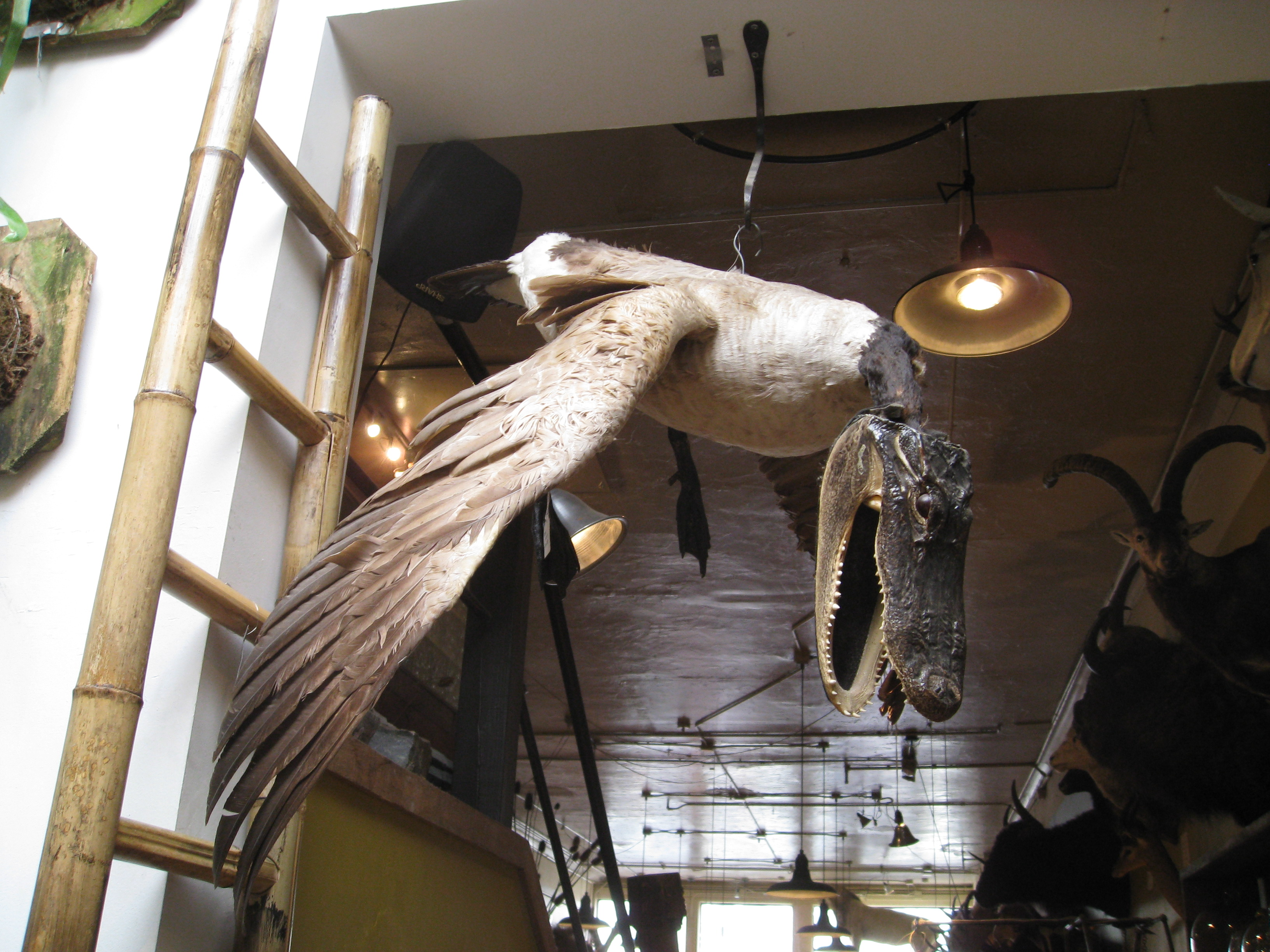
A taxidermied crocodile-goose hybrid at Paxton Gate

Paxton Gate is a San Francisco-based company founded in 1992 by Sean Quigley that is named after famed British gardener and architect Sir Joseph Paxton. Described by Quigley as "a natural history museum merged with a home products store and quirky gardening shop." It is an operation that features a large selection of natural science curiosities, taxidermy, numerous varieties of carnivorous plants, succulents, as well as gardening tools and a curated selection of books. The store's inventory emphasizes ephemera associated with the natural sciences, both of the animal and plant kingdoms, taxidermy, mounted insects, assorted neo-Victoriana, oddities, and products associated with the steampunk movement. They also offer a host of different workshops and events, including insect pinning, taxidermy classes and terrarium workshops. In 1999 the operation relocated from its original San Francisco Stevenson Street location to Valencia Street in the city's Mission District in order to accommodate its growing collections of vintage trophy mount taxidermy as well as fossils and minerals. The store freights a Victorian gentleman/inventor/botanist/biologist aesthetic that Time Out London once described as “Martha Stewart Meets David Lynch.”

Quigley opened Paxton Gate's Curiosities for Kids in 2008 and licensed a second operation, Paxton Gate Portland, to owners Andy and Susan Brown of Portland, Oregon., with a second Portland location opening in 2019.

In June 2019, Paxton Gate re-designed their e-commerce website for its stores and changed the name of its design arm, Paxton Gate Design/Build to RareField Design/Build the following year. Paxton Gate San Francisco is located at 824 Valencia Street, SF, CA 94110.

== RareField Design/Build ==
RareField Design/Build is Paxton Gate's Design/Build arm. Formerly known as Paxton Gate Design/Build, its original focus was on landscape for residential projects unrelated to the aesthetic of the store itself. This eventually led to designing and building the interiors of several noted San Francisco eating destinations including the restaurants Flour + Water and Central Kitchen and the French bakery Le Marais. as well as The Third Rail and Handline. The name Paxton Gate Design/Build was changed to RareField Design/Build in 2015.

RareField Design/Build shares the Paxton Gate Offices on the third floor of 766 Valencia Street, SF, CA 94110.

== Paxton Gate’s Curiosities for Kids ==
In December 2008 Quigley opened Paxton Gate's Curiosities for Kids at 766 Valencia Street.The 1,500 square foot space featured a life size tree built from wood and vines, vintage Structo fire trucks and books including Roald Dahl's Revolting Recipes and Freaky Flora, Curiosities for Kids was designed for children and their parents with games, toys, puzzles, classic books including Curious George, The Little Red Hen, Where the Side Walks Ends, as well as science kits and other inventory such as Silly Putty, Whoopee Cushions and Sock Monkeys that would be familiar to parents from their own childhoods, but uncommon in a modern toy marketplace, with its emphasis on electronics. In a nod to the original store's reputation for taxidermy, Curiosities also features taxidermy made from papier-mâché, a line of mounted plush animal heads and workshops and other including insect pinning, mask-making, demonstrations and birthday parties.

In part due to the changing demographics of San Francisco and online competition, the standalone Curioisities store was closed in 2019, though its approach and selection live on as curated sections in both the Valencia and Portland locations.
