= DeNorval Unthank Park =

Public park in Portland, Oregon, U.S.

Unthank Park
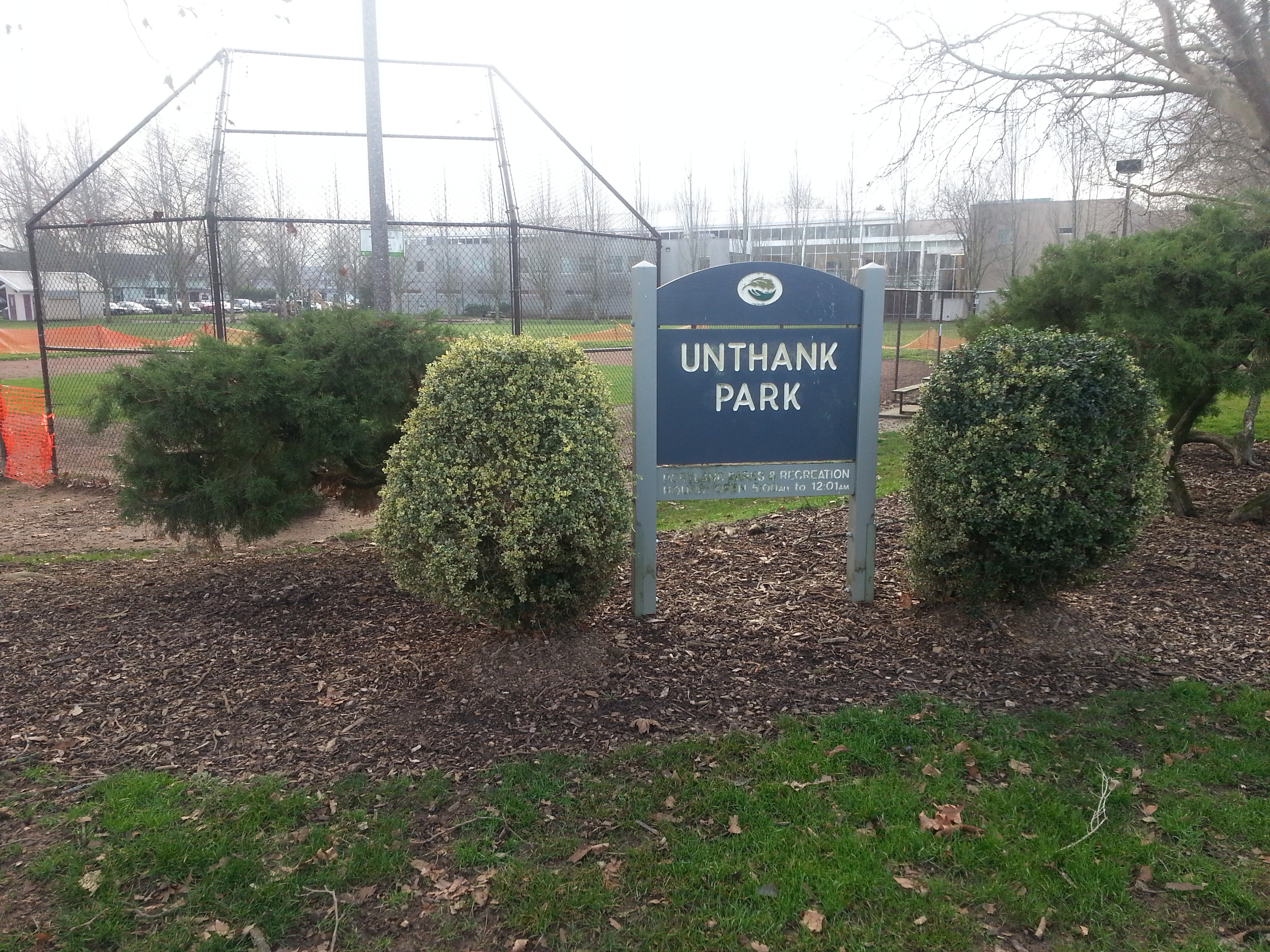

- Location within Portland, Oregon
- Type: Urban park
- Location: 510 N Shaver St. Portland, Oregon
- Coordinates: 45°33′02″N 122°40′20″W
- Area: 4.56 acres (1.85 ha)
- Created: 1966
- Operator: Portland Parks & Recreation
- Status: Open 5 a.m. to midnight daily

DeNorval Unthank Park, commonly known as Unthank Park, is a city park in the Boise neighborhood of Portland, Oregon, United States.

== Description and history ==
Unthank Park is named for DeNorval Unthank, a prominent African American doctor and community leader, who was one of the first black doctors in the state. It was acquired by the City of Portland in 1966 and named for Unthank in 1969. The park was rededicated in June 2011 in a ceremony honoring Unthank.

Amenities include a basketball court, baseball field, playground, and picnic tables.

== See also ==
- List of parks in Portland, Oregon
