= Urban League of Portland =

American nonprofit organization

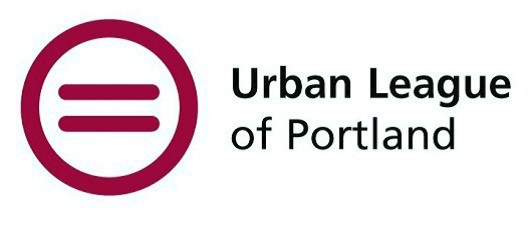
- Formation: 1945; 81 years ago
- Headquarters: Portland, Oregon, U.S.
- Parent organization: National Urban League
- Website: ulpdx.org

The Urban League of Portland is a service, civil rights, and advocacy organization for African Americans in the Pacific Northwest region. Today, the League is a non-profit, community-based organization committed to providing opportunities and support services for education, employment, health, economic security, and quality of life.

== History ==
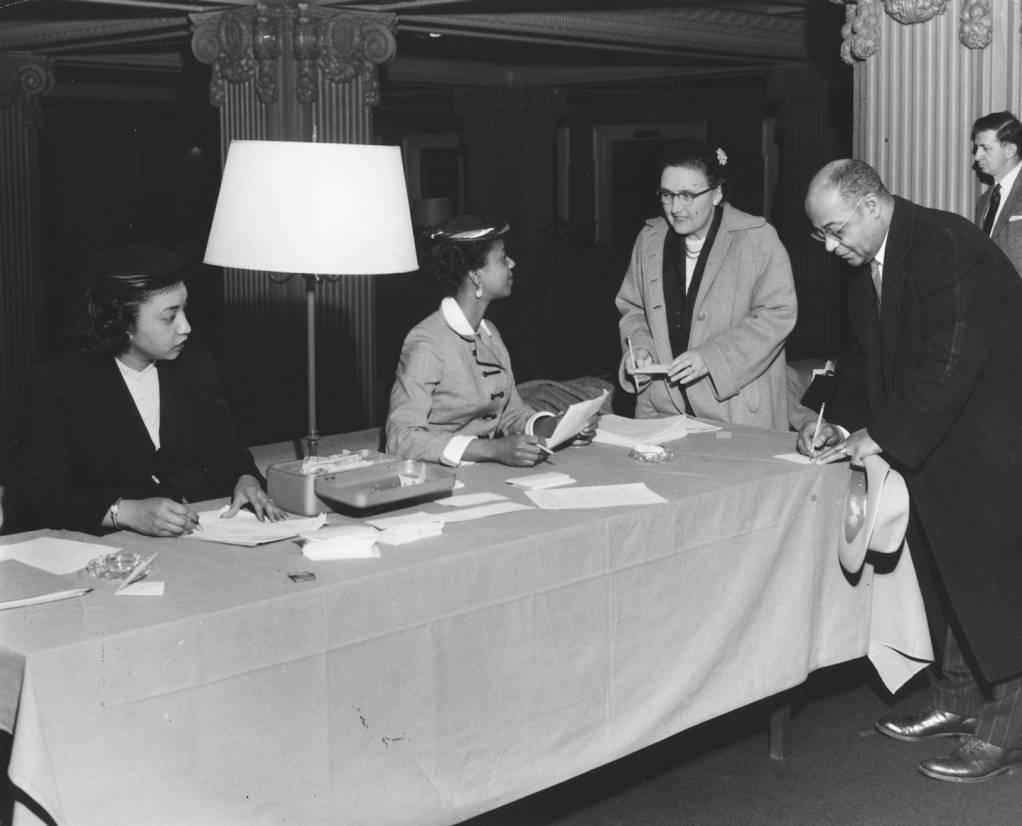
Housing conference registration table, Multnomah Hotel, Portland, Oregon, 1955

Prior to 1945 Portland was known for having a hostile racial environment, which led Reginald Johnson, Secretary for the National Urban League, to visit Portland to examine the conditions. With such a hostile racial environment, it was encouraged by the local citizens to organize a board of directors for Portland. In 1945, candidates were selected and the Urban League of Portland was formed.

The Urban League of Portland was established in 1945 as an affiliate of the National Urban League. It is one of the oldest African American civil rights and advocacy organizations in the region.

With the start of World War II, the need for constructing new ships for the US Navy increased. In Portland, the Kaiser shipyard needed a large number of new workers to meet these demands; thousands of African Americans migrated to the area. While Portland welcomed the economic boom, there was resistance from some residents to the workers living in their neighborhoods. As a result, many workers were limited to living in the Albina District and Vanport, a large community housing development for wartime workers and post-war workers.

After the war, Portland city officials wanted to relocate these “temporary” residents out of state. They contacted the National Urban League, an organization established in 1910 to assist African Americans in securing housing and job training in New York, as well as in communities throughout the country, to ease the adjustment to new urban settings. The National Urban League did not accept the city's request, and instead established the Urban League of Portland as a local chapter, in 1945. As a part of the effort to enhance housing opportunities, Edwin C. "Bill" Berry helped establish a network of resources for African American migrants arriving to the Portland area.

Nkenge Harmon Johnson is the president and chief executive officer as of 2021, and the organization employs more than 85 people.

== Education and advocacy ==
The Urban League of Portland has emphasized the importance of providing equality in housing and education for African Americans. They have advocated for fair housing laws and meaningful civic engagement opportunities, and continue to offer employment assistance, vocational education, community health services, summer youth programming, and senior services.
