= New Cascadia Traditional =

Bakery in Portland, Oregon, U.S.

- The bakery's exterior in 2022
- Interactive map of New Cascadia Traditional

Restaurant information
- Established: 2007
- Owners: Chris Gumke; Teresa Atkins
- Location: 2502 Southeast Division Street, Portland, Multnomah, Oregon, 97202, United States
- Coordinates: 45.5046°N 122.6401°W
- Website: newcascadiatraditional.com

New Cascadia Traditional (NCT) is a gluten-free bakery in Portland, Oregon, United States. Established in 2007, the business initially operated at farmers' markets before spouses and co-owners Chris Gumke and Teresa Atkins opened a brick-and-mortar shop in southeast Portland's Hosford-Abernethy neighborhood in 2008. New Cascadia Traditional supplies local restaurants and has received a positive reception from critics. The bakery has been featured on the Food Network series Cupcake Wars.

== Description ==
New Cascadia Traditional (NCT) is a gluten-free bakery in southeast Portland's Hosford-Abernethy neighborhood. According to Nicholas DeRenzo of Condé Nast Traveler, the business has "non-traditional" flours made of ingredients such as brown rice, millet, sorghum, tapioca, and teff.

=== Menu ===
The menu has included bagels, breads (including baguettes, challah, hoagie rolls, and sandwich loaves), cheddar-chive biscuits, chocolate brownies, cakes and cupcakes, cinnamon rolls, cookies, doughnuts, maple bars, pizzas, potato pancakes, sandwiches, and other pastries. Among the bagel varieties is the everything bagel. Bread varieties have included chocolate-cranberry, coffee cake, multigrain, and orange-currant loaf.

For brunch, NCT has served granola, quiches, buttermilk biscuits and doughnuts, as well as soft-boiled bagels with lox and cream cheese. The bakery has offered holiday specials for Thanksgiving, including rolls as well as apple and pumpkin pies, and sticky buns in December. For Thanksgiving in 2011, they served apple cranberry pie, cookies, date pudding, multigrain and sourdough rolls, pecan pie, and a vegan chocolate peanut butter tart. NCT has also offered vegan food options.

== History ==
NCT is Portland's first gluten-free retail bakery. Spouses and co-owners Chris Gumke and Teresa Atkins started the bakery in 2007, making "the gluten-free stuff [they] couldn't find anywhere else", according to Gumke. Initially, the couple sold products at farmers' markets (including the Portland Farmers Market) before opening a brick-and-mortar shop in southeast Portland in 2008. The business also operated a production facility in Tigard as of 2008. NCT supplies baked goods to local cafes, coffee shops, and grocery stores. The bakery had approximately 30 employees in 2012.

Cambria Goodwin has been the head pastry chef. A baker represented NCT in an episode of the Food Network's reality competition series Cupcake Wars. Push x Pull has served bagels and cookies from NCT.

== Reception ==
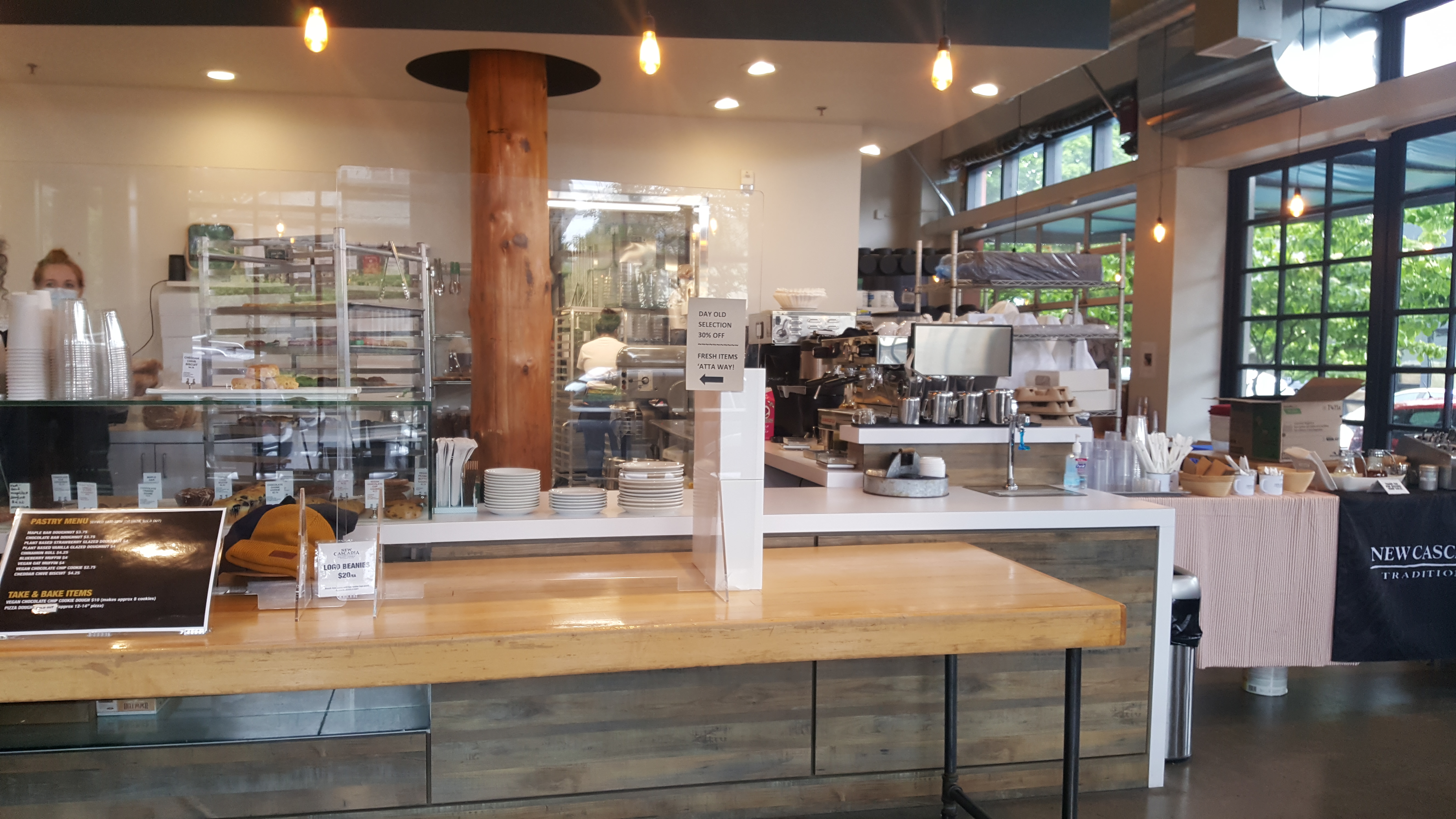
The bakery's interior, 2022

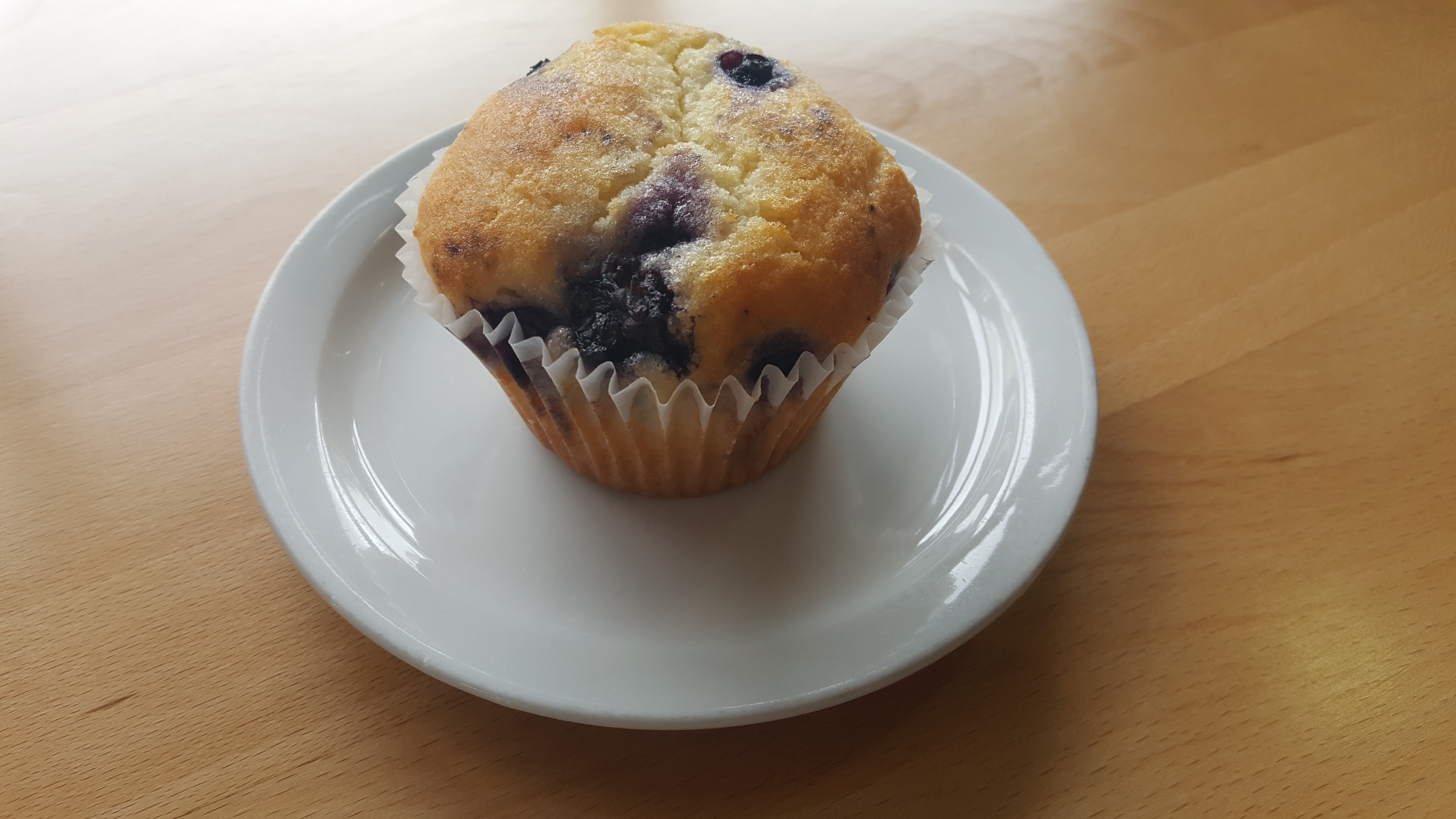
Blueberry muffin (2022)

In the early 2010s, Willamette Week said the business "has found quite a following since opening less than two years ago". In 2014, the newspaper's Matthew Korfhage said NCT "is now the nuts-and-bolts old guard of Portland gluten-free baking". Sophia June ranked NCT thirteenth in Willamette Week's 2017 list of the best boiled bagels in Portland, writing: "Having a dedicated gluten-free bakery is cool, but maybe gluten-free bagels shouldn't exist." The business was a runner-up in the Best Gluten-Free Restaurant category of the newspaper's annual 'Best of Portland' readers' poll in 2022. It was a finalist in the same category in 2026.

Allison Jones and Tuck Woodstock included the bakery in Portland Monthly's 2014 "essential gluten-free food and drink guide" of the city. Cami Hughes included the business in the newspaper's 2021 overview of the city's "top-tier" gluten-free bakeries and recommended the maple bar donut. Ali Wilkinson included NCT in PDX Parent's 2017 list of family-friendly, "allergy-friendly" eateries. In 2020, Nicholas DeRenzo of Condé Nast Traveler said: "If your local grocery store has a limited gluten-free selection, you'll want to fill your freezer with New Cascadia's baguettes, buns, egg-free challahs, and crusty loaves."

Sararosa Davies and Pechluck Laskey included NCT in Eater Portland's 2022 list of the city's "knockout" gluten-free restaurants and bakeries. In 2025, Davies included NCT in a similar list, and Paolo Bicchieri said the business "provides a strong Rose City example of a decade-old fully gluten-free baking operation, pros in bagels and pizza". Yelp included NCT and its Snowball Cookies in a 2023 "state-by-state guide to the best holiday desserts" in the U.S. The Food Network has said the bakery "has become a favorite among the vegan and gluten-free communities in Portland".

== See also ==
- List of bakeries
