= King, Portland, Oregon =

King
- Neighborhood
- Interactive map of King
- Coordinates: 45°33′26″N 122°39′31″W
- Country: United States
- State: Oregon
- City: Portland

Government
  - Association: King Neighborhood Association
  - Coalition: Northeast Coalition of Neighborhoods

Area
  - Total: 0.64 sq mi (1.66 km^{2})

Population (2000)
  - Total: 5,979
  - Density: 9,330/sq mi (3,600/km^{2})

Housing
  - No. of households: 2148
  - Occupancy rate: 92% occupied
  - Owner-occupied: 1119 households (52%)
  - Renting: 1029 households (48%)
  - Avg. household size: 2.78 persons

King is a neighborhood in the northeast section of Portland, Oregon, United States. Like many of the surrounding neighborhoods, King has historically had one of the highest proportions of non-white residents in the city. Census data taken 2010 show that the neighborhood was 60.1% white.

King straddles Martin Luther King Jr. Boulevard from Ainsworth Street to Fremont and is at one end of the Alberta Arts District, a commercial district where locally owned shops, galleries, and cafés have brought new life. Once predominantly African-American, the neighborhood has rapidly gentrified since the 1990s and attracted more young, mostly white residents. It was previously an area of high crime rates related to gang activity, poverty, and the crack epidemic of the 1980–1990s. With its proximity to the Alberta Commercial Corridor, King is now seen as one of the more popular Portland neighborhoods with housing prices remaining above Portland average.

== History ==
Part of the historic Portland district known as Albina, after the city that once existed here before being merged with Portland, King and other predominantly African-American neighborhoods were subjected to redlining whereby realtors could be penalized by their professional organization if they sold homes to blacks outside the district. White residents were encouraged to flee before their property values fell. Home loans were not available to African Americans because of outright discrimination, or economic self-protection of mortgage lenders aware of the falling prices. When larger banks were required to not discriminate, they avoided making loans by using a policy of set minimum loan amounts that precluded prospective buyers from purchasing the homes in the district that were priced substantially below the Portland average.

People in Albina who wanted to purchase homes were forced to either come up with cash or to turn to predatory lenders such as Dominion Capital that purchased a large portfolio of cheap homes and made predatory loans with complicated terms to Albina residents. The loans had high interest rates with as much as 18% or more and monthly payments were as low as the buyers could pay–even if they would not pay down accumulating interest. The instrument used was a land-sale contract and typically the total loan amount would come due in five years. By this time, most buyers owed more than they initially paid and Dominion would retake possession of the house and the residents would be evicted poorer than when they started.

There has been some displacement of black residents whose rents increased, and some properties have turned over to white owners or renters in the process of an older generation passing on. Some long-time residents were also able to sell their homes to take advantage of increased prices if they wanted to move to smaller quarters. The neighborhood still has one of the highest concentrations of black residents in the city and as such is often still referred to as an African American neighborhood. Though African Americans are no longer a majority, they still form a strong plurality at 34.1% of the neighborhood's 8,654 residents according to the 2010 Census. There is also a small portion of the neighborhood's southern end which has a population of 1,967 that is roughly 59% African American. It is now the only portion of the city, along with the Woodlawn and Woodlawn Park neighborhood areas, where African-Americans make up a majority.

== Notable people ==
- Esperanza Spalding
