= Boise, Portland, Oregon =

Boise
- Neighborhood
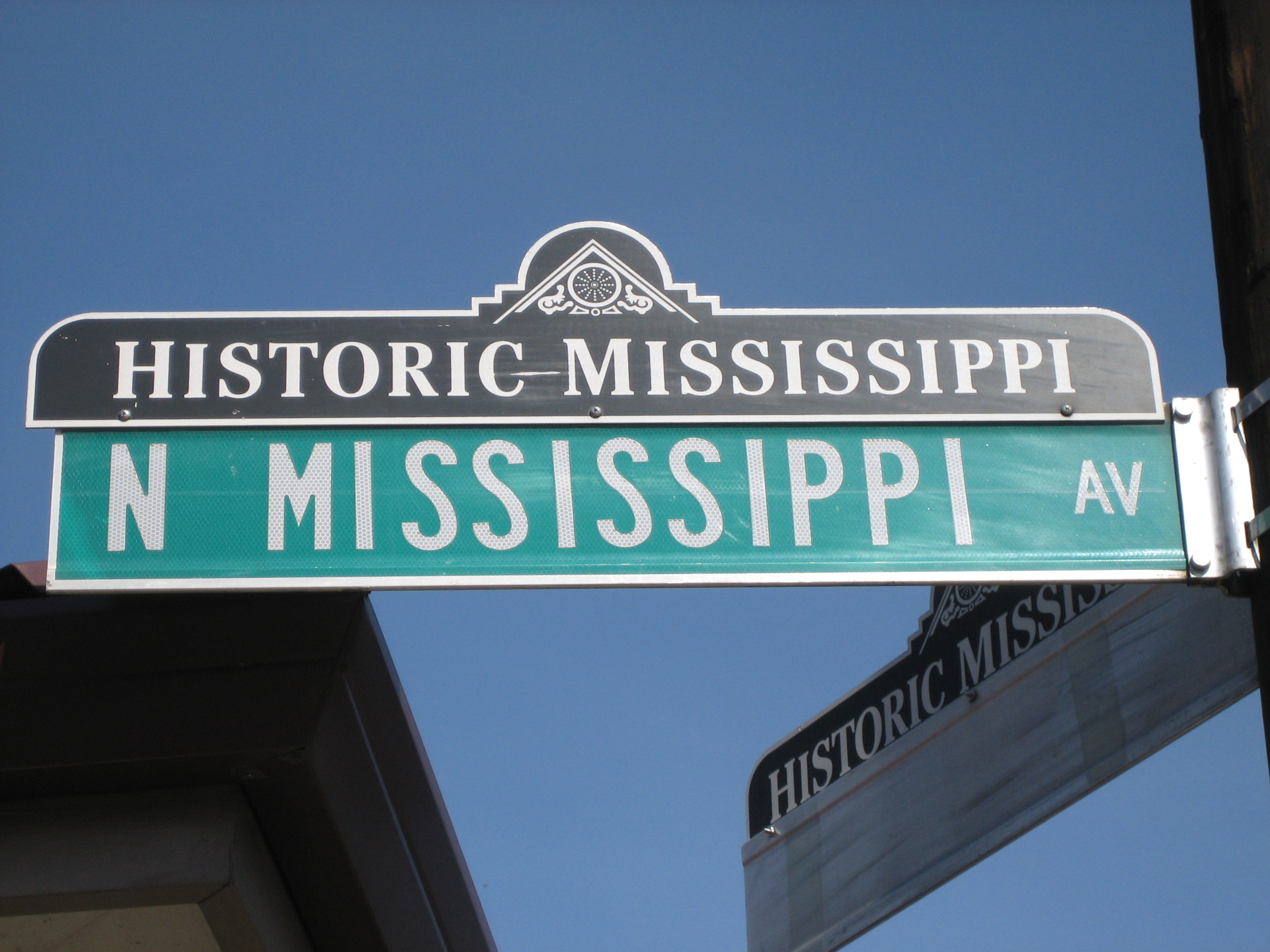
- Historic Mississippi business district street sign topper in the Boise Neighborhood
- Interactive map of Boise
- Coordinates: 45°33′03″N 122°40′16″W
- Country: United States
- State: Oregon
- City: Portland

Government
  - Association: Boise Neighborhood Association
  - Coalition: Northeast Coalition of Neighborhoods

Area
  - Total: 0.43 sq mi (1.1 km^{2})

Population (2020)
  - Total: 4,660
  - Density: 10,837/sq mi (4,184/km^{2})

Housing
  - No. of households: 2312
  - Occupancy rate: 88.3% occupied
  - Owner-occupied: 525 households (45%)
  - Renting: 643 households (55%)
  - Avg. household size: 2.0 persons

Boise (/bɔɪz/ BOYZ) is a neighborhood in the North and Northeast sections of Portland, Oregon. It is officially bounded by Interstate 5 on the west, N Skidmore St. on the north, NE Rodney Ave. on the east, and N Kerby St. and NE Fremont St. on the south. The southern portion of N Mississippi Ave. forms the commercial core of the area. The neighborhood was named in honor of Reuben P. Boise, a Portland School Board member during the 1850s.

In the mid-20th century, Boise residents included a high percentage of African Americans, relative to other Portland neighborhoods. This changed rapidly in the 2000s. The 2000 Census recorded 48% of the population identifying as Black or African American, either alone or mixed with another race. By the time of the 2010 Census, this number had fallen to 26.6%, largely supplanted by Whites. This demographic change has accompanied rapid development and gentrification in the neighborhood.

Unthank Park is located in Boise.

== Demographics ==
In 2020, 4,660 people lived in Boise, up 41% from 3,311 in 2010, up 6% from 3,119 in 2000. 68% of people identified as white, 13.9% as Black or African American, 6.4% as Asian, 3.3% as American Indian or Alaska Native, 0.7% as Native Hawaiian or Pacific Islander, and 8.4% as some other race. 11.2% identified as Hispanic or Latino (any race). The median age in Boise was 33.6. The median household income was listed at $91,000 and 21% of the neighborhood was covered by tree canopy. 67% of residents voted in the 2020 general election.
