= North Portland, Oregon =

Sextant of Portland, Oregon

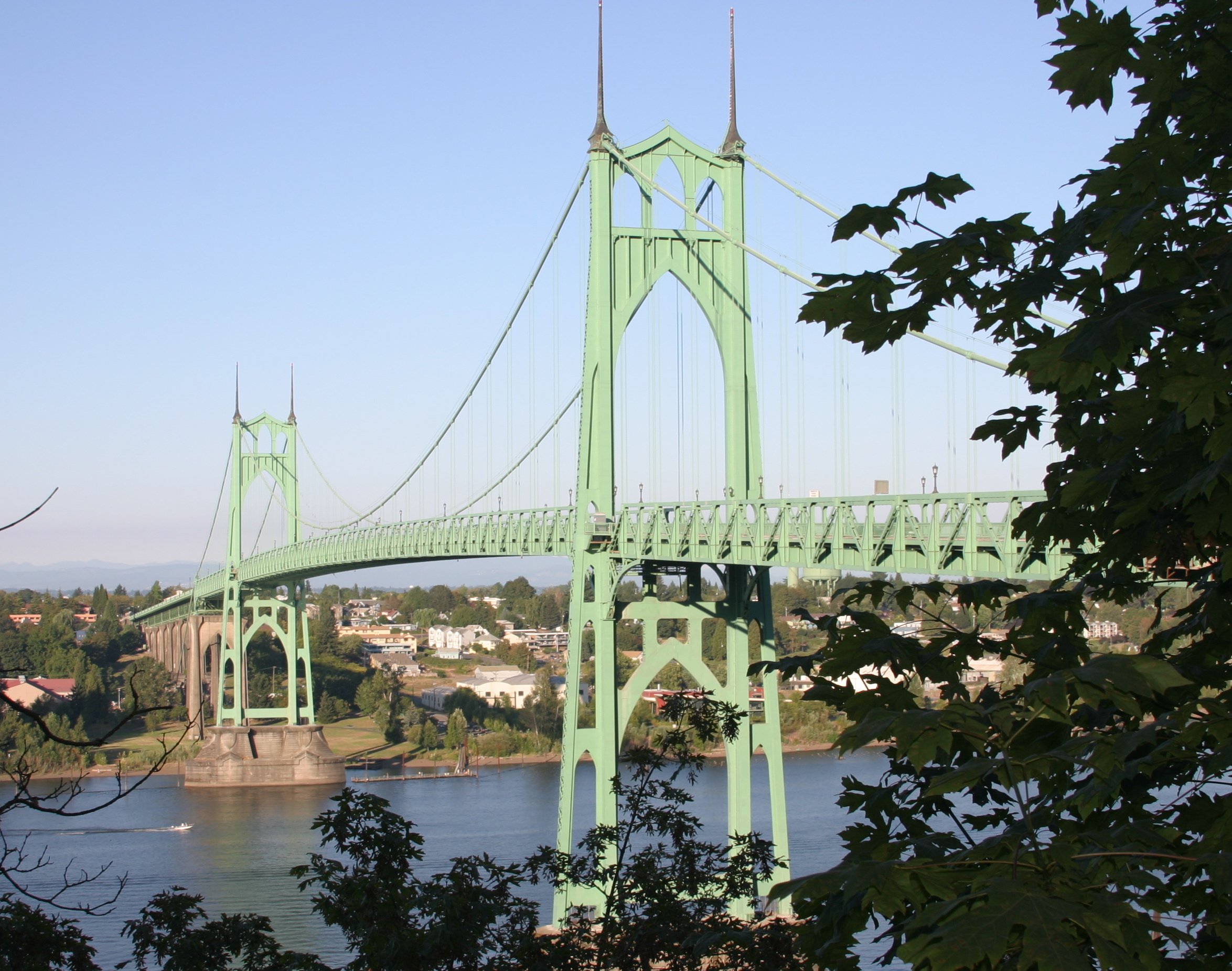
St. Johns Bridge

North Portland is one of the six sextants of Portland, Oregon.

North Portland is a diverse mixture of residential, commercial, and industrial areas. It includes the Portland International Raceway, the University of Portland, and massive cargo facilities of the Port of Portland. Nicknames for it include "NoPo" and "the Fifth Quadrant" (for having been the odd-one out from the four-cornered logic of SE, NE, SW, and NW, prior to the 2020 arrival of South Portland).

North Portland is connected to the industrial area of Northwest Portland by the St. Johns Bridge, a 2,067 ft (630.0 m) long suspension bridge completed in 1931 and extensively rehabilitated in 2003–2005.

During World War II, a planned development named Vanport was constructed to the north of this section between the city limits and the Columbia River. It grew to be the second-largest city in Oregon, but was wiped out by a disastrous flood in 1948. Columbia Villa, another wartime housing project in North Portland, was redeveloped in 2003–2005 and reopened as New Columbia. The complex offers public housing, rental housing, and single-family home ownership units. In 2004, the MAX Yellow Line opened along North Interstate Avenue. The light rail line parallels I-5, stopping short of crossing the Columbia River.

== See also ==
- National Register of Historic Places listings in North Portland, Oregon
- Neighborhoods of Portland, Oregon
