= Government of Portland, Oregon =

Mayor–council government system of Portland, Oregon

Government of the City of Portland, Oregon
- Seal of Portland, Oregon
- Formation: 1851; 175 years ago
- City charter: Portland City Charter
- Website: www.portland.gov

City-wide elected officials
- City Auditor: Portland City Auditor

Legislative branch
- Legislature: Portland City Council
- Meeting place: Portland City Hall

Executive branch
- Mayor: Mayor of Portland, Oregon
- Appointed by: Election
- Headquarters: Portland City Hall

The government of Portland, Oregon, is based on a mayor–council government system. Elected officials include the mayor, a 12-member city council, and a city auditor. The city council is responsible for legislative policy, while the mayor appoints a professional city manager who oversees the various bureaus and day-to-day operations of the city. The mayor is elected at-large, while the council is elected in four geographic districts using single transferable vote, with 3 winning candidates per district. Portland's current form of government was approved by voters in a 2022 ballot measure, with the first elections under the new system held in 2024.

Prior to 2022, Portland used a city commission government system, with the mayor and four city commissioners directly overseeing operations of the city bureaus. Under the previous system, all elected officials were elected at-large and served four-year terms with no term limits. Portland began using a commission form of government in 1913 following a public vote on May 3 of that year.

== History ==
City Hall

The Portland Charter was the subject of much debate circa 1911–1912. Rival charters were drafted by four different groups, including the "official charter committee," appointed by the mayor; the "people's charter committee," constituted under the auspices of the East Side Business Men's Club; another citizen's committee which drafted the Short Charter; and the "people's committee," led by W.C. Benbow, which drafted the Benbow Charter. The Short Charter was unusual in that it would have used Bucklin voting to elect the mayor and implemented interactive representation of the people through the commissioner system; each commissioner's vote would have been weighted according to the number of votes he received in the election. The city council appointed a committee to draft a compromise charter. This charter, along with the Short Charter, were defeated in referendums. The following year, the city council submitted another charter to the people, which was accepted. The city commission government form consequently came into use in 1913, with H. Russell Albee being the first mayor under the new system.

=== 2022 charter reform ===
Ballot Measure 26–228 in the November 2022 election was an amendment to the city charter that moved the city away from a commission system of government. It expands the council from four at-large council members to 12 councilors, who are elected via single transferable vote from four geographic electoral districts (with three council members from each district). The mayor is no longer a voting member of the council, except when needed to make a tie-breaking vote. It also transferred responsibility for direct management of city bureaus from commissioners to a city manager overseen by the mayor and confirmed by the council. Previous attempts to reform the city charter had been defeated seven times since 1913, including as recently as 2007.

The first city council elections under the new districts were held in 2024. In preparation for transitioning management of city bureaus to a city manager, then-mayor Ted Wheeler announced he would group city bureaus into five related service areas. By 2025, six service areas had been formed, including Budget & Finance, City Operations, Community & Economic Development, Public Safety, Vibrant Communities, and Public Works. Additionally, four bureaus were placed under the City Administrator’s office, facilitating close oversight from the mayor.

== City Council ==
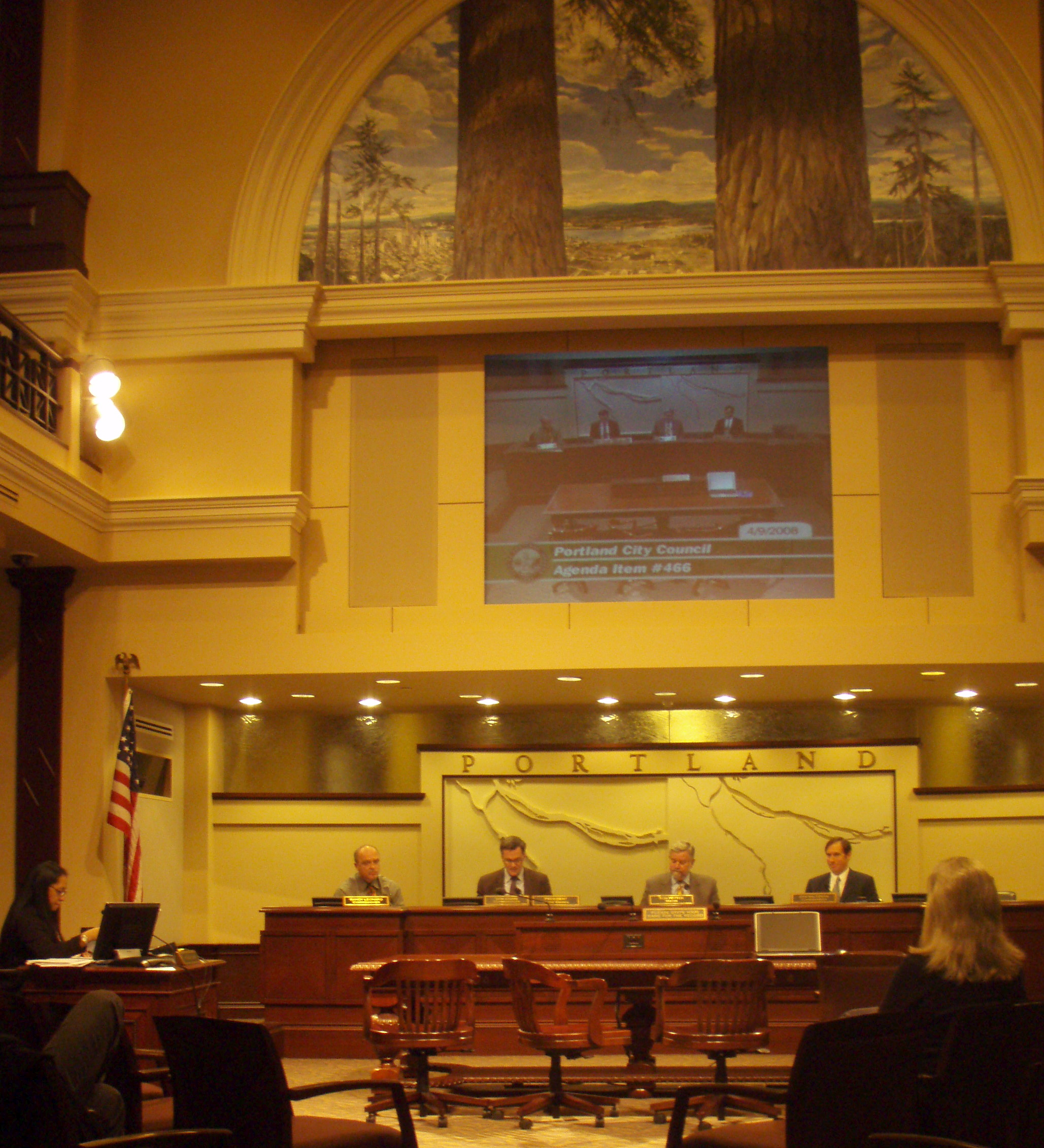
Portland City Council in session in April 2008. From left, Randy Leonard, Sam Adams (then city commissioner), then-Mayor Tom Potter, and Dan Saltzman.

Terms are staggered, with the mayor and councilors for districts 1 and 2 elected in the same years as presidential elections, while the auditor and the councilors for districts 3 and 4 elected in the same years as gubernatorial elections. The City Council convenes on Wednesday mornings and Wednesday afternoons in the council chamber on the second floor of Portland City Hall, and meetings are open to the public.

=== Current city council members ===
Note: all current members of Portland City Council are registered Democrats. Their political group indicated below refers to their caucus membership.

District	Name	Political group	Elected
1	Candace Avalos	Peacock (Progressive)	2024
1	Loretta Smith	Moderate	2024
1	Jamie Dunphy	Peacock (Progressive)	2024
2	Dan Ryan	Moderate	2020
2	Elana Pirtle-Guiney	Moderate	2024
2	Sameer Kanal	Peacock (Democratic Socialist)	2024
3	Steve Novick	Moderate	2024
3	Tiffany Koyama Lane	Peacock (Democratic Socialist)	2024
3	Angelita Morillo	Peacock (Democratic Socialist)	2024
4	Olivia Clark	Moderate	2024
4	Mitch Green	Peacock (Democratic Socialist)	2024
4	Eric Zimmerman	Moderate	2024

=== Notable former commissioners ===
- Neil Goldschmidt, who went on to serve as mayor, U.S. Secretary of Transportation, and governor.
- Mildred Schwab
- Congressman Earl Blumenauer served on the council before his election to the House.
- Mike Lindberg – member of council for 17 years (1979–1996), a longer tenure than any other commissioner in the 40-year period up to 2009 (and until surpassed in 2016)
- Gretchen Kafoury
- Charlie Hales – on the council 1993–2002 and again, as mayor, from January 2013 through 2016
- Jim Francesconi
- Dan Saltzman – member of council for 20 years (January 1999 – December 2018), longer than any person since 1969

== Elections ==
City Council seats, the city auditor, and the mayor are non-partisan, elected positions; each carries a four-year term. Beginning with the 2024 election, 12 councilors are elected via the single transferable vote ranked-choice voting method from four geographic districts (with three council members from each district). The Mayor and City Auditor are elected at-large using the instant runoff ranked-choice voting method. From 1913 to 2024 candidates faced off in a primary election (typically in May of even-numbered years); if no candidate won more than 50% of the vote, the top two finishers faced off in a runoff election (typically the following November.) Three Council seats, including the mayor, were up for election in 2008; the other two seats, and the Auditor position, were up for election in 2010.

From 2006 to 2010, Portland used a publicly financed election system, allowing candidates to qualify for public funding of $145,000 if they could gather 1000 five-dollar contributions by a certain date (for Mayoral candidates, 1500 contributions of $5 were required for a $160,000 grant). Two candidates availed themselves of this system in 2006: incumbent Erik Sten, who won the primary election, and Amanda Fritz, who lost out to incumbent Dan Saltzman but won a seat two years later (utilizing publicly financed election money). The November 2010 elections saw Portlanders rescind their support for this publicly financed election system.

== City bureaus and services ==
The city is divided into six service areas, each of which oversees several bureaus and city offices. A seventh group is overseen by the city Administrator as well as the mayor.

=== City Administrator ===
As of December 2025, the mayor has appointed Raymond Lee as the city administrator.

Bureaus and offices overseen by the city administrator:

- Portland Office of Community and Civic Life
- Portland Office of Equity and Human Rights
- Portland Office of Government Relations
- Portland Solutions

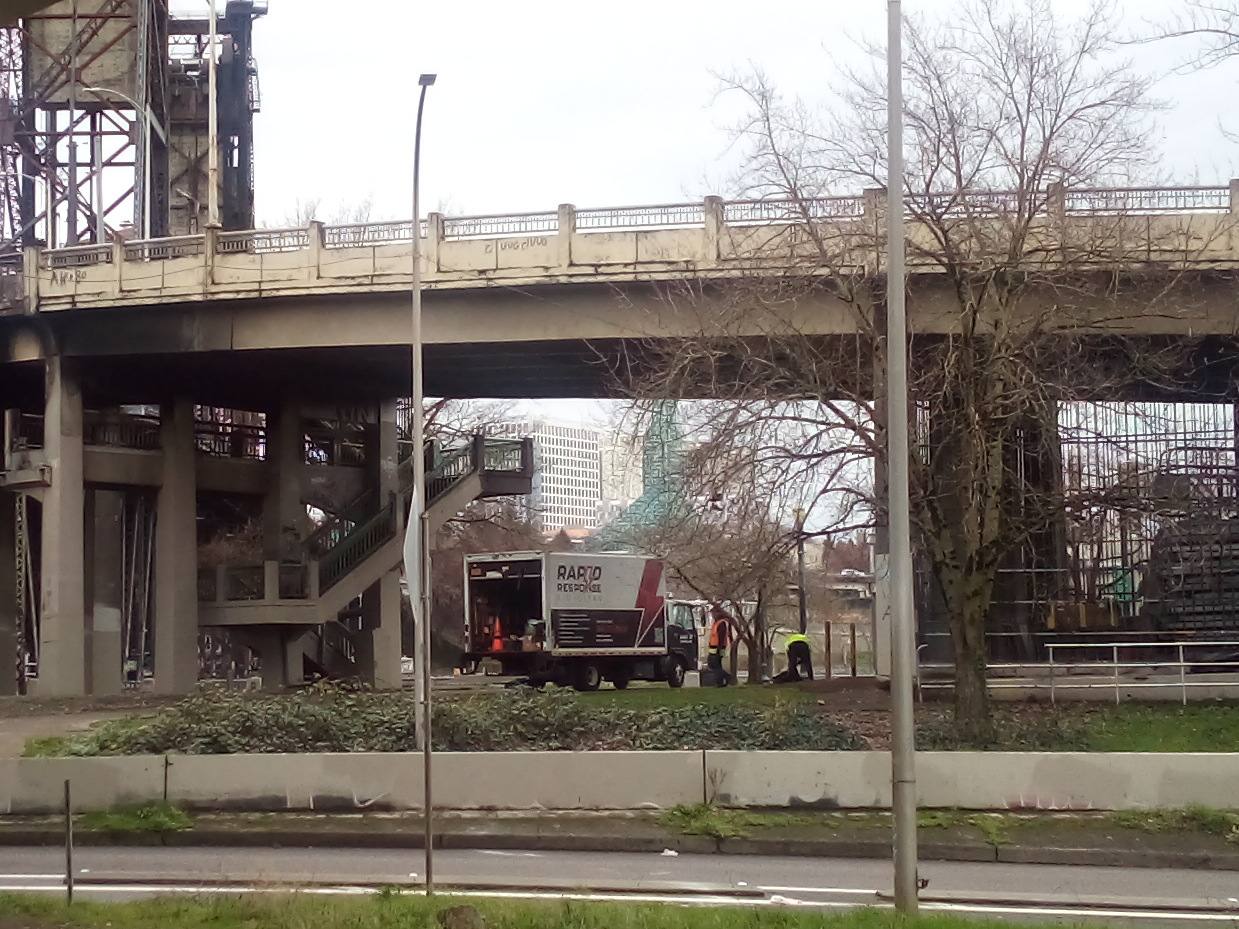
Portland Solutions Impact Reduction Program contractor setting up to remove homeless camp in Old Town Chinatown neighborhood in Northwest Portland

==== Neighborhood government ====
Portland's neighborhood system, the Portland Office of Community and Civic Life, is made up of 94 recognized neighborhood associations and seven neighborhood district coalition offices located throughout the city. These offices provide support and technical assistance to the volunteer-based neighborhood associations, community groups and individual activists.

==== Joint Office of Homeless Services ====
In 2016, former Multnomah County chair Deborah Kafoury and former Portland mayor Ted Wheeler created the Joint Office of Homeless Services, which receives funding from both the county and city governments. In September 2020, frustrated by tents downtown, Mayor Wheeler expressed the intent to withdraw the City of Portland from its partnership with county on JOHS. The intergovernmental agreement between the city and county had an expense of $32.5 million to the Portland City Government in 2020. Partially using federal funds from the American Rescue Plan Act of 2021, the Joint Office of Homeless Services uses city-owned land to site Safe Rest Villages, which are managed temporary housing that augments the homeless shelter system.

As of 2025, JOHS, Safe Rest Villages, as well as other related programs are overseen by Portland Solutions.

==== Controversy over illegal-camp cleanups ====
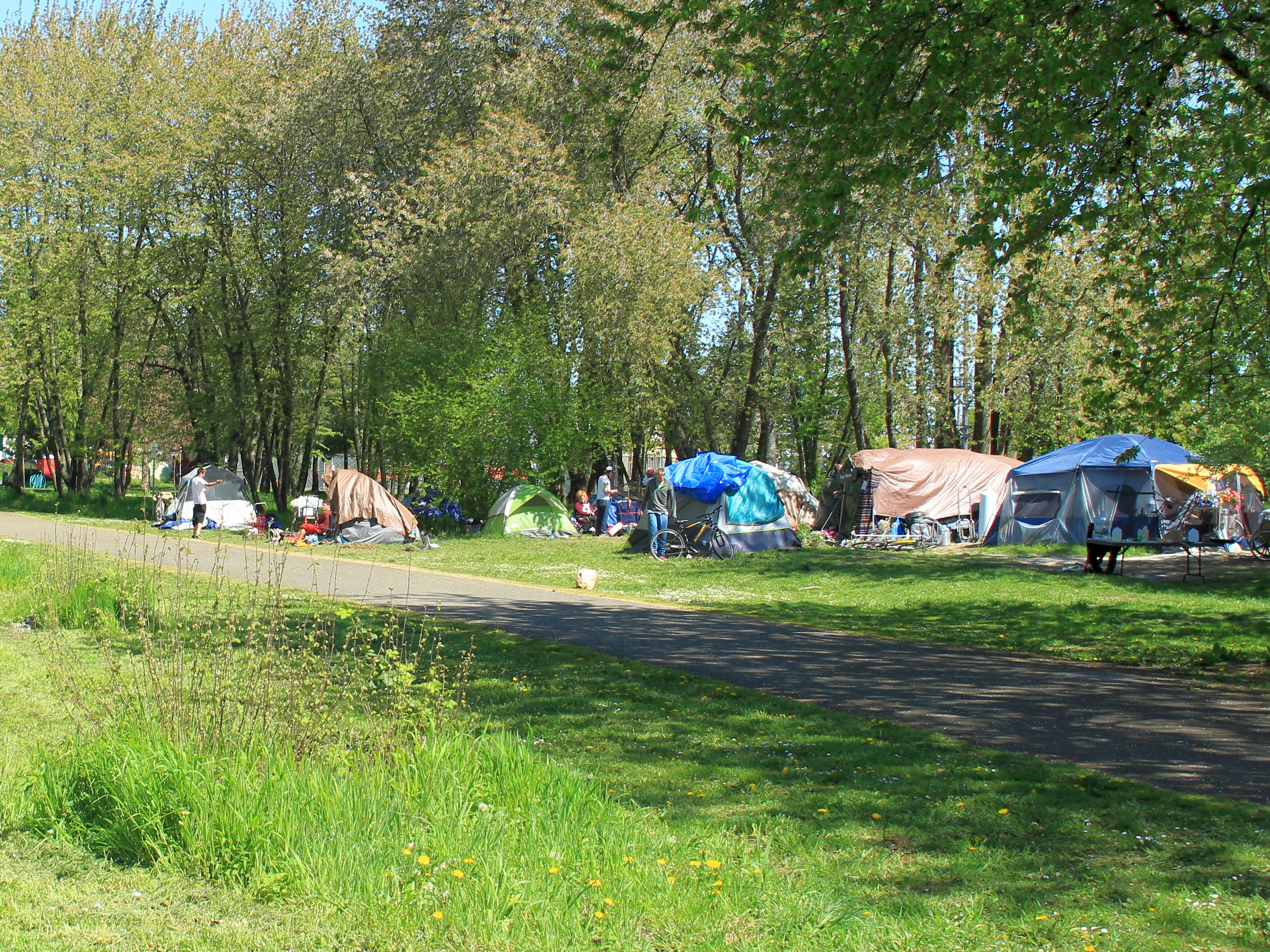
A transient encampment on Peninsula Crossing Trail in North Portland

Multiple news outlet reported on the city auditor's 2019 report on the city's handling of illegal campsite clean ups by the Homelessness/Urban Camping Impact Reduction Program. Since 2015, the City of Portland implemented a streamlined campsite complaint intake. City contractors then removed tents, items and other items and stored them. The database was to prioritize cleanup based on "biohazards, garbage and other factors, such as whether campers are aggressive or openly using drugs". The Oregonian summarized that the auditors found little evidence prioritization was occurring and no clear indication of what criteria were invoked in selecting which camps are to be removed or not removed and auditors documented the city often ignored hundreds of complaints made by residents. The newspaper commented "That non-response doesn’t comport with the crackdown on illegal camping instituted by Mayor Ted Wheeler earlier in his term." The audit conducted in summer and fall of 2018 reported that the city needed to improve communications to illegal campers as well as complainants. The auditor recommends providing complainants with a status update. In 2019, the city announced they intend to do that with a new app that helps people "better record and understand HUCIRP" In January 2023, the city launched a web interface providing some information on reported camps.

=== Portland Revenue Division ===
The Revenue Division administers tax programs such as the Portland Business License Tax, Multnomah County Business Income Tax, as well as additional local tax programs including the Portland Arts Tax.

=== City Operations ===
Bureaus and offices overseen by the City Operations service area include:

- Portland Independent Police Review
- Community Police Oversight Board

=== Community & Economic Development ===
Bureaus and offices overseen by the Community & Economic Development service area include:

- Portland Housing Bureau
- Portland Bureau of Planning and Sustainability
- Prosper Portland

==== Portland Housing Bureau ====
The Portland Housing Bureau manages programs aimed at increasing affordable housing.

=== Public Safety ===
As of January 1, 2025, Mike Myers is the Deputy City Administrator for Public Safety.

Bureaus and offices overseen by the Public Safety service area include:

- Portland Fire & Rescue
- Portland Police Bureau

The Portland Police Bureau is the primary policing agency in the city. Formerly, the Police Bureau reported to the mayor, while Portland Fire & Rescue was assigned to a commissioner. The city also has an office of emergency management planning for mitigation of natural and manmade disasters.

=== Vibrant Communities ===
As of January 1, 2025, Sonia Schmanski, is the Deputy City Administrator for Vibrant Communities. On March 31, 2025, it was announced that the Vibrant Communities Service Area would be dissolved with its bureaus and offices moved to the Public Works and Community & Economic Development service areas starting July 1, 2025.

Bureaus and offices overseen by the Vibrant Communities service area include:

- Portland Office of Arts & Culture
- Portland Parks & Recreation

==== Parks and Recreation ====
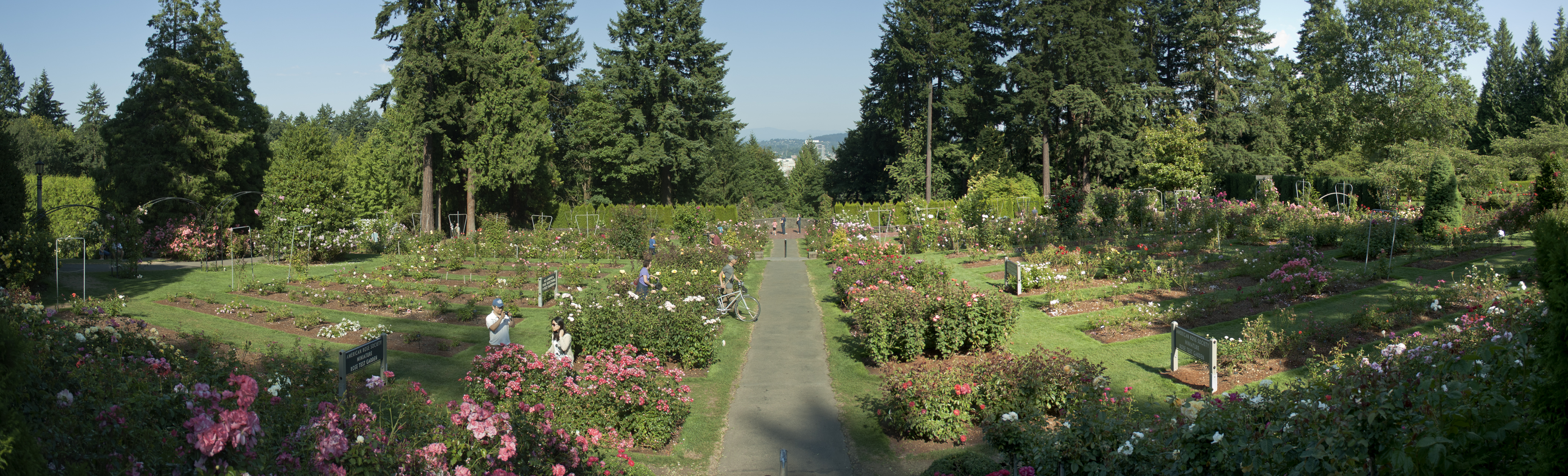
The International Rose Test Garden within Washington Park is one of many parks operated by the City of Portland.

Portland Parks & Recreation manages 11,760 acres of public park lands in the city, including large natural areas like Forest Park and public recreation facilities such as municipal playgrounds, pools, golf courses, and the Portland International Raceway.

=== Public Works ===
As of January 1, 2025, Priya Dhanapal is the Deputy City Administrator for Public Works.

Bureaus and offices overseen by the Public Safety service area include:

- Portland Environmental Services
- Portland Bureau of Transportation
- Portland Water Bureau

Portland Water Bureau manages municipal water services through the city, while the Bureau of Environmental Services (BES) manages sewer and stormwater systems. Waste collection and recycling is managed by the Bureau of Planning and Sustainability, which also runs the Portland Clean Energy Community Benefits Fund investing in renewable energy development.

==== Transportation ====
Public transit within the city is primarily the responsibility of TriMet, not the city government, but the Portland Streetcar and Portland Aerial Tram are exceptions; both are owned by the city. The aerial tram is managed by Oregon Health & Science University (OHSU).

While parking enforcement is typically managed by the police departments in U.S. cities, it is managed under transportation department (PBOT) in Portland.

== Education ==
Portland Public Schools operates more than 81 schools and is one of the largest pre-kindergarten through high school districts in the state. As of 2022, Portland also provides tax-payer funded universal preschool, after voters approved a city measure in 2020.

== Related government entities ==
Portland is the county seat of Multnomah County, and the core of Metro, a regional government primarily concerned with land use planning. Both of these government entities have a strong impact on Portland policy.

== See also ==
- Portland City Hall (Oregon)
