= Portland's 2nd City Council district (Oregon) =

City electoral district in Oregon, US

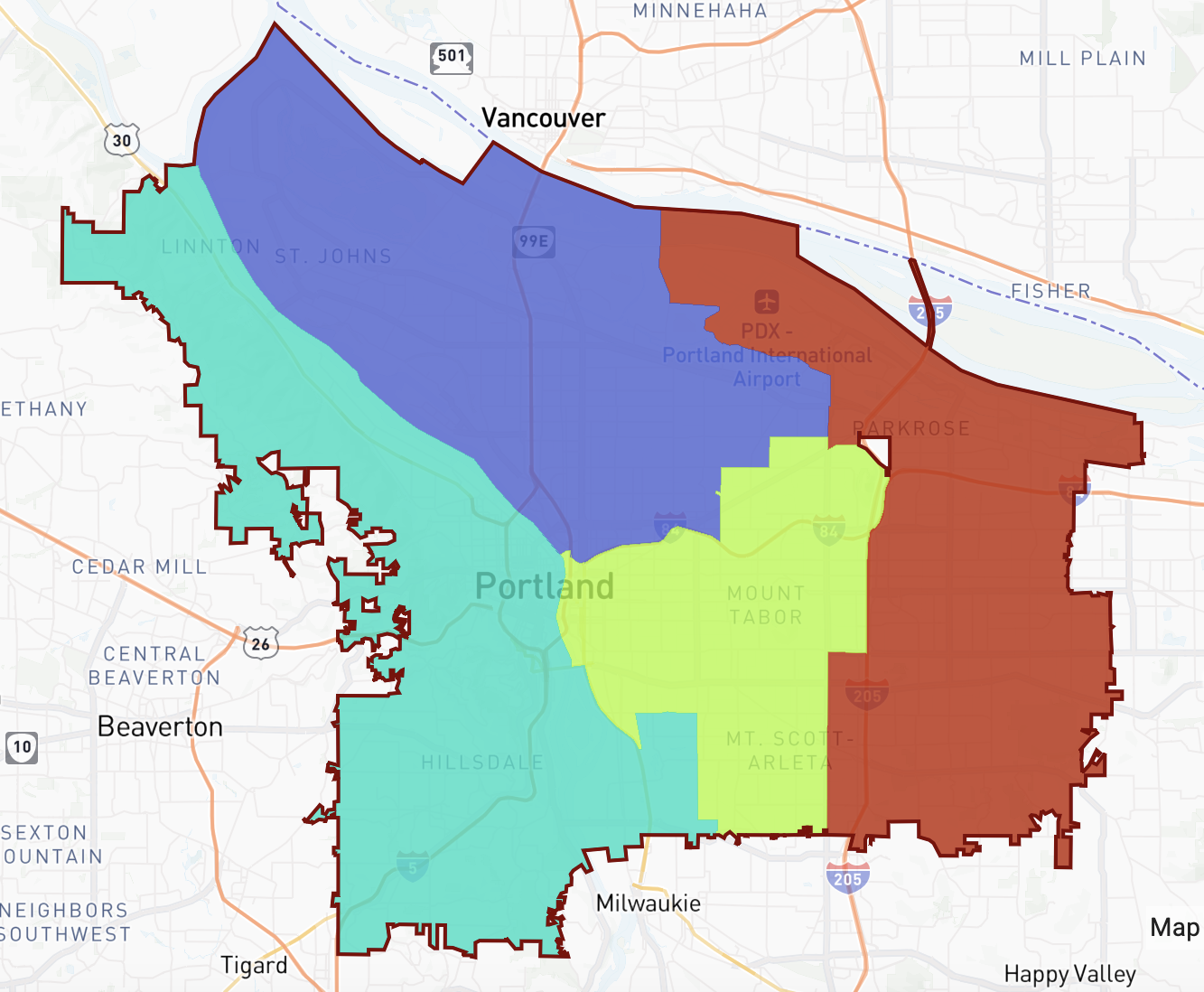
- The four districts electing members to Portland City Council. District 2 is shown in dark blue.

Government
  - Type: Mayor-council government
  - Body: Portland City Council (Oregon)

Population (2023)
  - Total: 160,716

Demographics
  - White: 65.4%
  - Hispanic: 12.5%
  - Black: 8.4%
  - Asian: 4.0%
  - Native Hawaiian & Pacific Islander: 7.4%
  - American Indian: 0.7%

Registration
  - Democratic: 61%
  - Republican: 5%
  - Non-affiliated voters (NAVs): 29%
  - Other party: 5%

Portland's 2nd City Council district is one of four multi-member districts electing three people to Portland City Council in Portland, Oregon. The district contains most of North and Northeast Portland north of Interstate 84 and west of 82nd Avenue.

The district contains the neighborhoods of Alameda, Arbor Lodge, Beaumont-Wilshire, Boise, Bridgeton, Cathedral Park, Concordia, Cully, Dignity Village, East Columbia, Eliot, Grant Park, Hayden Island, Hollywood, Humboldt, Irvington, Kenton, King, Lloyd District, Madison South, Overlook, Piedmont, Portsmouth, Sabin, St. Johns, Sullivan's Gulch, Sumner, Sunderland, University Park, Vernon, and Woodlawn.

District 2 is currently represented on Portland City Council by Dan Ryan, Elana Pirtle-Guiney, and Sameer Kanal. They were elected to four-year terms in 2024.

Pirtle-Guiney currently serves as the first president of the new city council and is the council's first LGBTQ+ woman (along with Angelita Morillo of District 3). Ryan is the one of two members of the new City Council who previously served on the City Commission (along with Steve Novick of District 3), while Kanal is the first Asian American to serve on city council (along with Tiffany Koyama Lane of District 3).

== Election results ==
=== 2024 ===
District 2 results

2024 Portland, Oregon City Council election, District 2
| Party | Candidate | FPv% | Count | | | | | | | | | | | | | | | | | | | | | | |
| Party | Candidate | FPv% | 1 | 2 | 3 | 4 | 5 | 6 | 7 | 8 | 9 | 10 | 11 | 12 | 13 | 14 | 15 | 16 | 17 | 18 | 19 | 20 | 21 | 22 | 23 |
|---|---|---|---|---|---|---|---|---|---|---|---|---|---|---|---|---|---|---|---|---|---|---|---|---|---|
| Nonpartisan | Dan Ryan | 15.6 | 12,047 | 12,061 | 12,066 | 12,088 | 12,117 | 12,171 | 12,235 | 12,353 | 12,469 | 12,512 | 12,639 | 12,687 | 12,990 | 13,362 | 14,089 | 15,120 | 15,501 | 15,880 | 16,491 | 17,710 | 17,765.3 | 21,238.8 | 19,290 |
| Nonpartisan | Elana Pirtle-Guiney | 16.1 | 12,447 | 12,452 | 12,458 | 12,471 | 12,502 | 12,514 | 12,571 | 12,593 | 12,644 | 12,772 | 12,870 | 12,979 | 13,181 | 13,398 | 13,694 | 13,859 | 14,786 | 15,358 | 16,663 | 18,135 | 18,445.5 | 21,573.2 | 19,290 |
| Nonpartisan | Sameer Kanal | 12.9 | 9,924 | 9,929 | 9,945 | 9,958 | 9,980 | 10,024 | 10,070 | 10,091 | 10,188 | 10,373 | 10,503 | 10,892 | 10,983 | 11,132 | 11,277 | 11,452 | 12,355 | 14,260 | 17,540 | 20,366 | 19,290 | 19,290 | 19,290 |
| Nonpartisan | Tiffani Penson | 9.4 | 7,218 | 7,224 | 7,237 | 7,251 | 7,341 | 7,391 | 7,449 | 7,497 | 7,589 | 7,694 | 7,854 | 7,960 | 8,132 | 8,334 | 8,784 | 9,261 | 9,645 | 10,384 | 11,831 | 13,319 | 13,532.4 | | |
| Nonpartisan | Nat West | 7.1 | 5,462 | 5,466 | 5,480 | 5,494 | 5,519 | 5,560 | 5,634 | 5,674 | 5,719 | 5,856 | 6,008 | 6,187 | 6,368 | 6,572 | 6,777 | 7,036 | 7,598 | 8,460 | 9,231 | | | | |
| Nonpartisan | Michelle DePass | 8.9 | 6,838 | 6,847 | 6,863 | 6,877 | 6,908 | 6,928 | 6,988 | 6,998 | 7,058 | 7,110 | 7,184 | 7,226 | 7,341 | 7,420 | 7,576 | 7,698 | 7,994 | 8,293 | | | | | |
| Nonpartisan | Marnie Glickman | 5.2 | 3,997 | 3,998 | 4,004 | 4,011 | 4,029 | 4,052 | 4,080 | 4,089 | 4,131 | 4,210 | 4,394 | 4,544 | 4,584 | 4,695 | 4,839 | 4,953 | 5,326 | | | | | | |
| Nonpartisan | Jonathan Tasini | 4.4 | 3,404 | 3,408 | 3,415 | 3,431 | 3,446 | 3,461 | 3,502 | 3,533 | 3,562 | 3,633 | 3,663 | 3,864 | 3,918 | 4,101 | 4,241 | 4,369 | | | | | | | |
| Nonpartisan | Bob Simril | 3.3 | 2,520 | 2,523 | 2,531 | 2,563 | 2,580 | 2,623 | 2,642 | 2,750 | 2,813 | 2,839 | 2,884 | 2,909 | 3,071 | 3,269 | 3,607 | | | | | | | | |
| Nonpartisan | Mariah Hudson | 3.0 | 2,287 | 2,287 | 2,296 | 2,317 | 2,356 | 2,396 | 2,444 | 2,512 | 2,580 | 2,640 | 2,709 | 2,738 | 2,919 | 3,092 | | | | | | | | | |
| Nonpartisan | Michael (Mike) Marshall | 2.1 | 1,646 | 1,647 | 1,654 | 1,669 | 1,688 | 1,718 | 1,731 | 1,804 | 1,830 | 1,884 | 1,920 | 1,993 | 2,161 | | | | | | | | | | |
| Nonpartisan | James Armstrong | 1.9 | 1,476 | 1,480 | 1,488 | 1,497 | 1,520 | 1,600 | 1,689 | 1,763 | 1,783 | 1,815 | 1,887 | 1,959 | | | | | | | | | | | |
| Nonpartisan | Chris Olson | 1.6 | 1,233 | 1,234 | 1,238 | 1,247 | 1,269 | 1,290 | 1,296 | 1,311 | 1,322 | 1,461 | 1,532 | | | | | | | | | | | | |
| Nonpartisan | Debbie Kitchin | 1.6 | 1,228 | 1,233 | 1,238 | 1,245 | 1,265 | 1,290 | 1,309 | 1,338 | 1,361 | 1,403 | | | | | | | | | | | | | |
| Nonpartisan | Jennifer Park | 1.4 | 1,114 | 1,117 | 1,126 | 1,137 | 1,174 | 1,180 | 1,214 | 1,224 | 1,241 | | | | | | | | | | | | | | |
| Nonpartisan | Nabil Zaghloul | 1.1 | 834 | 835 | 849 | 856 | 872 | 883 | 897 | 909 | | | | | | | | | | | | | | | |
| Nonpartisan | Will Mespelt | 1.0 | 759 | 762 | 765 | 779 | 789 | 840 | 856 | | | | | | | | | | | | | | | | |
| Nonpartisan | Laura Streib | 0.9 | 707 | 708 | 711 | 716 | 755 | 767 | | | | | | | | | | | | | | | | | |
| Nonpartisan | Reuben Berlin | 0.9 | 656 | 659 | 665 | 673 | 676 | | | | | | | | | | | | | | | | | | |
| Nonpartisan | Liz Taylor | 0.8 | 628 | 630 | 646 | 651 | | | | | | | | | | | | | | | | | | | |
| Nonpartisan | Sam Sachs | 0.4 | 304 | 305 | 311 | | | | | | | | | | | | | | | | | | | | |
| Nonpartisan | Antonio Jamal PettyJohnBlue | 0.3 | 217 | 219 | | | | | | | | | | | | | | | | | | | | | |
| Nonpartisan | Uncertified Write In | 0.3 | 211 | | | | | | | | | | | | | | | | | | | | | | |
Quota: 19,290
