= DarSalam (restaurant) =

Restaurant chain in Portland, Oregon, U.S.

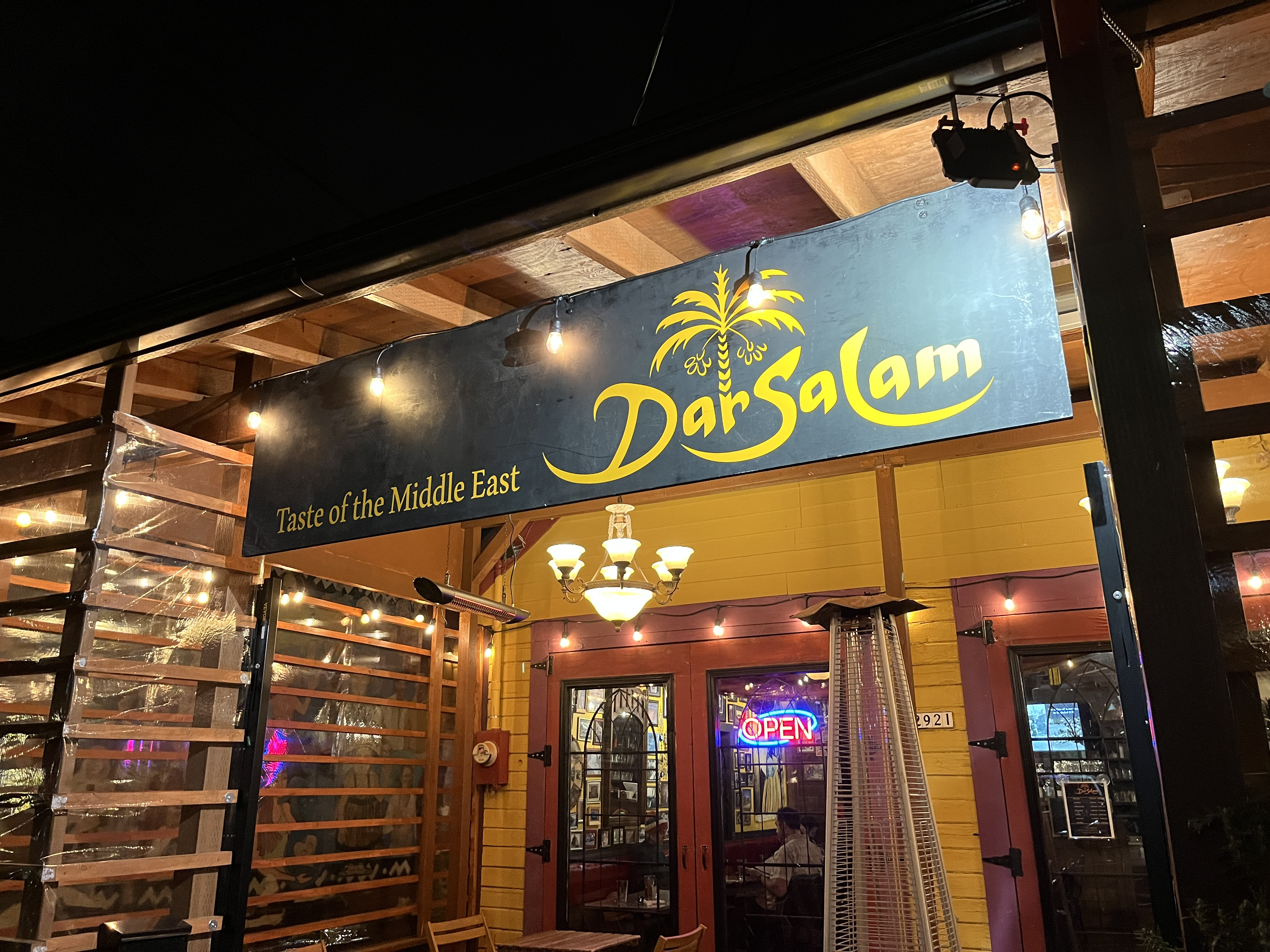
- Exterior of the original location on Alberta Street in northeast Portland's Concordia neighborhood at night in 2024

Restaurant information
- Established: 2012
- Food type: Iraqi
- Location: Portland, Multnomah, Oregon, United States
- Website: darsalamrestaurant.com

DarSalam, or Dar Salam, is a small chain of Iraqi restaurants in Portland, Oregon, United States. The original restaurant opened in northeast Portland's Concordia neighborhood in 2012 and a downtown location followed in 2015. The business has also operated on Hawthorne Boulevard in southeast Portland and in northwest Portland.

== Description ==
The family-owned Iraqi restaurant chain DarSalam operates in Portland, Oregon. The business name means "house of peace". There are locations on Alder Street in downtown Portland and on Alberta Street in northeast Portland's Concordia neighborhood. The Concordia location operates in a former carriage house and has a garden and patio. The interior of the downtown location has a mural resembling Babylon's Ishtar Gate, a bar and private dining room, and a stage. DarSalam has also operated on Hawthorne Boulevard in southeast Portland and in northwest Portland.

=== Menu ===
DarSalam's menu includes meze, chicken and rice, baklava, and cardamom tea. Red lentil soup and beet salad are among appetizers. The restaurant has also served baba ganoush and hummus with pita, dolmas, falafel and queema, as well as lamb stew with chickpea. Lamb shanks are served with eggplant stew or pickled mango salad. Meats are halal and organic. There are many gluten-free and vegan options.

Drinks include Iraqi beer, an anise-flavored cocktail, Lebanese wines, coffee, and mint lemonade. Other cocktails use Middle Eastern ingredients such as hibiscus, saffron, and tamarind. The Tree of Life has sage-infused gin with Herbsaint, Peychaud's barrel-aged bitters, dry cider, and grenadine.

== History ==
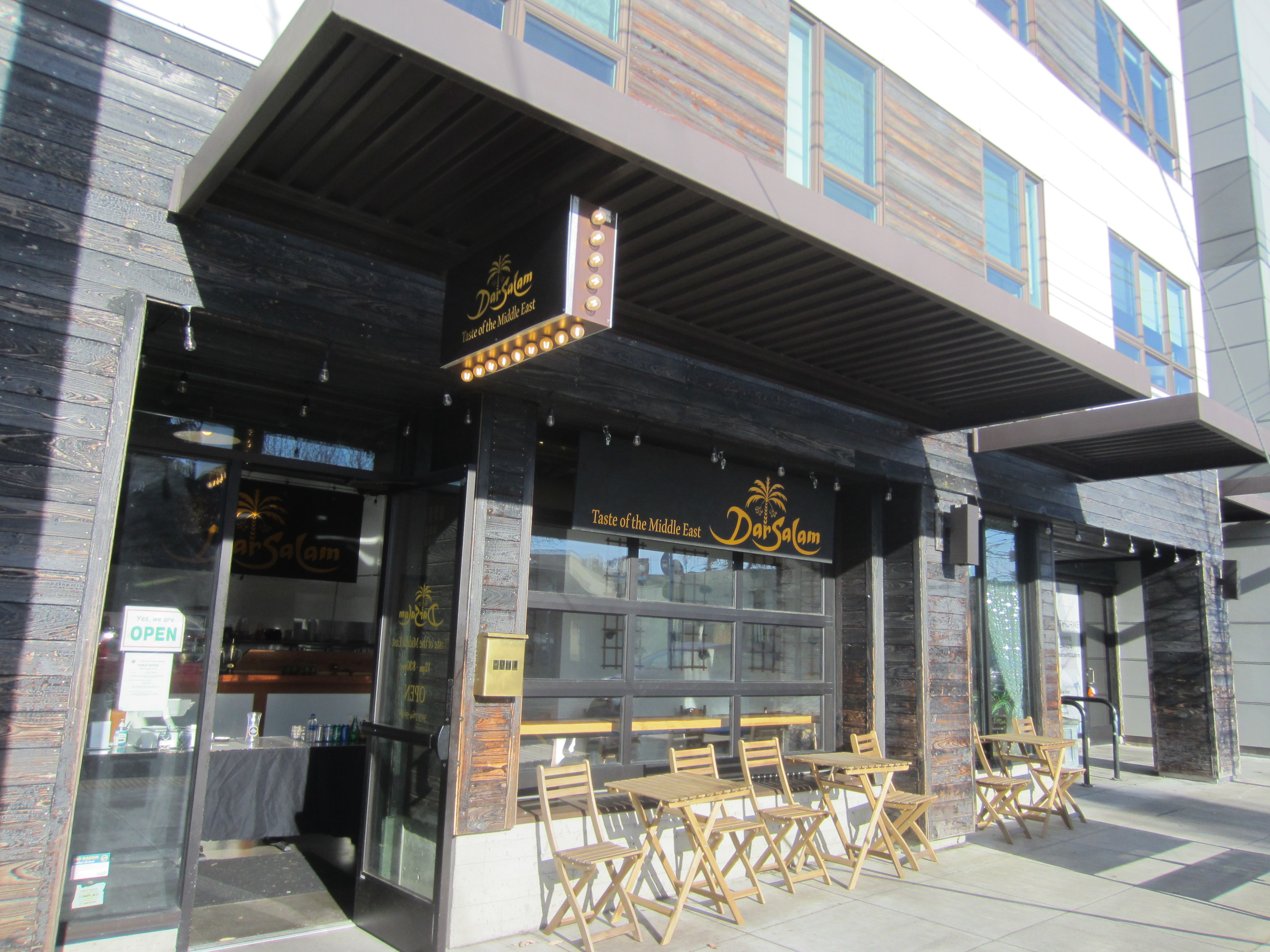
Exterior of the restaurant in southeast Portland, 2021

Ghaith and Tiffany Sahib have been co-owners, along with Shaymaa Alquriqche. Ghaith Sahib has been credited for starting the Concordia restaurant in 2012. The business suffered a fire in 2013.

The downtown location opened on August 12, 2015. DarSalam was Portland's only brick and mortar Iraqi restaurant in 2016.

In 2017, a marine was charged with hate crime after he threw a chair at one of the servers at the Concordia location. The charges were later dropped.

Like many restaurants, DarSalam was forced to close temporarily upon the arrival of the COVID-19 pandemic. Both locations closed and multiple employees were laid off. The downtown location was burglarized in 2022.

== Reception ==
In 2020, Karen Brooks of Portland Monthly said the restaurant's falafel was arguably the city's best. Brooke Jackson-Glidden included DarSalam in Eater Portland's 2025 overview of the city's best halal restaurants. She described DarSalam as Portland's "most famous" Iraqi restaurant.

== See also ==
- List of Middle Eastern restaurants
