= Portland's 3rd City Council district (Oregon) =

City electoral district in Oregon, US

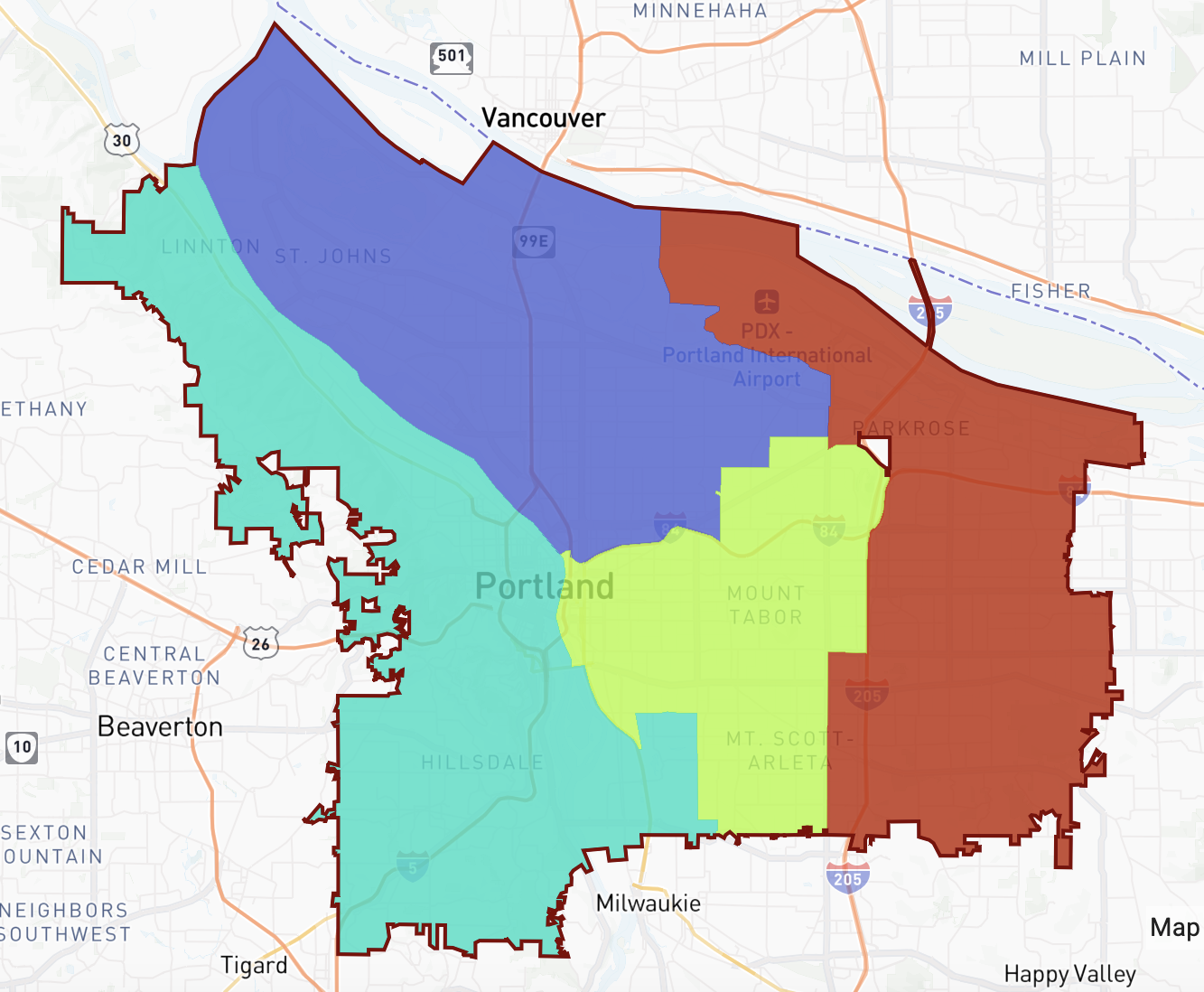
- The four districts electing members to Portland City Council. District 3 is shown in light-green/lime.

Government
  - Type: Mayor-council government
  - Body: Portland City Council (Oregon)

Population (2023)
  - Total: 167,642

Demographics
  - White: 72.3%
  - Hispanic: 8.7%
  - Asian: 7.2%
  - Black: 3.0%
  - Native Hawaiian & Pacific Islander: 1.2%
  - American Indian: 0.5%
  - Other: 0.7%
  - Two or more races: 7.3%

Registration
  - Democratic: 59%
  - Republican: 6%
  - Non-affiliated voters (NAVs): 29%
  - Other party: 6%

Portland's 3rd City Council district is one of four multi-member districts electing three people to Portland City Council in Portland, Oregon. The district contains most of Southeast Portland south of Interstate 84 and west of Interstate 205, as well as a small sliver of Northeast Portland east of 47th Avenue and south of Prescott Avenue.

The district contains the neighborhoods of Brentwood-Darlington, Brooklyn, Buckman, Creston-Kenilworth, Foster-Powell, Hosford-Abernethy (including Ladd's Addition), Kerns, Laurelhurst, Madison South, Montavilla, Mt. Scott-Arleta, Mt. Tabor, North Tabor, Richmond, Rose City Park, Roseway, South Tabor, Sunnyside, and Woodstock

District 3 is currently represented on Portland City Council by Steve Novick, Angelita Morillo, and Tiffany Koyama Lane. They were elected to two-year terms in 2024; after the 2026 election, all future terms will be four years.

Morillo is the first LGBTQ+ woman (along with Elana Pirtle-Guiney of District 2), the first LGBTQ+ person of color, and the second immigrant to serve on Portland City Council.

Koyama Lane is the first Asian American (along with Sameer Kanal of District 2) and the first Asian American woman to serve on Portland City Council. She also serves as the council's first vice president after her unanimous selection.

Novick is one of two former City Commissioners (along with Dan Ryan of District 2) to serve on the new City Council.

== Election results ==
=== 2024 ===
District 3 results

2024 Portland, Oregon City Council election, District 3
Party	Candidate	FPv%	Count																													
Party	Candidate	FPv%	1	2	3	4	5	6	7	8	9	10	11	12	13	14	15	16	17	18	19	20	21	22	23	24	25	26	27	28	29	30
Nonpartisan	Steve Novick	24.2	20,457	20,468	20,479	20,500	20,508	20,518	20,539	20,553	20,566	20,590	20,620	20,668	20,698	20,735	20,789	20,844	20,873	20,936	21,015	21,141	21,129	21,129	21,129	21,129	21,129	21,129	21,129	21,129	21,129	21,129
Nonpartisan	Angelita Morillo	19.4	16,399	16,411	16,415	16,424	16,440	16,482	16,512	16,547	16,554	16,568	16,589	16,607	16,616	16,696	16,799	16,869	17,098	17,168	17,262	17,725	17,726.3	17,863.3	18,388.4	18,631.4	18,849.4	19,246.7	19,380.8	20,589	22,312.7	21,129
Nonpartisan	Tiffany Koyama Lane	19.3	16,320	16,326	16,333	16,338	16,348	16,369	16,387	16,406	16,424	16,429	16,449	16,484	16,494	16,545	16,624	16,690	16,818	16,879	17,036	17,406	17,407	17,623	17,884.1	18,114.1	18,308.1	18,677.3	18,910.3	20,108.5	21,670.8	21,129
Nonpartisan	Kezia Wanner	6.3	5,313	5,314	5,317	5,319	5,329	5,337	5,340	5,349	5,353	5,369	5,374	5,397	5,425	5,448	5,466	5,485	5,505	5,558	5,696	5,714	5,715.05	5,907.06	6,031.09	6,330.11	6,808.14	7,023.22	8,808.29	9,634.56	10,523.8	10,669.2
Nonpartisan	Rex Burkholder	4.7	3,951	3,958	3,968	3,974	3,986	3,988	3,995	4,006	4,008	4,016	4,031	4,048	4,064	4,093	4,135	4,160	4,191	4,279	4,374	4,443	4,443.96	4,634.99	4,781.09	4,949.1	5,126.11	5,621.76	5,890.79	6,812.1		
Nonpartisan	Jesse Cornett	4.6	3,860	3,863	3,872	3,875	3,885	3,890	3,905	3,915	3,916	3,919	3,927	3,940	3,955	4,014	4,052	4,077	4,099	4,146	4,195	4,326	4,326.96	4,448.98	4,539.03	4,834.06	4,976.07	5,217.26	5,440.28			
Nonpartisan	Harrison Kass	3.3	2,786	2,791	2,794	2,800	2,814	2,814	2,818	2,822	2,823	2,831	2,836	2,853	2,897	2,912	2,929	2,941	2,949	3,007	3,083	3,105	3,105.19	3,183.2	3,215.2	3,471.22	3,809.22	3,966.24				
Nonpartisan	Philippe Knab	1.8	1,551	1,553	1,555	1,558	1,562	1,565	1,569	1,576	1,578	1,580	1,587	1,608	1,616	1,657	1,660	1,670	1,689	1,732	1,765	1,803	1,806.05	1,928.08	2,293.34	2,380.36	2,476.36					
Nonpartisan	Sandeep Bali	1.7	1,408	1,409	1,413	1,416	1,423	1,424	1,427	1,430	1,432	1,441	1,449	1,474	1,512	1,522	1,537	1,583	1,622	1,716	1,871	1,906	1,906.08	2,017.09	2,114.09	2,229.1						
Nonpartisan	Daniel DeMelo	1.9	1,571	1,573	1,574	1,575	1,582	1,584	1,594	1,603	1,609	1,620	1,624	1,642	1,661	1,683	1,743	1,765	1,787	1,822	1,883	1,950	1,950.19	2,061.2	2,111.21							
Nonpartisan	Cristal Azul Otero	1.7	1,405	1,405	1,407	1,407	1,413	1,425	1,433	1,446	1,449	1,453	1,465	1,477	1,487	1,505	1,522	1,555	1,624	1,657	1,736	1,809	1,809.63	1,906.64								
Nonpartisan	Jonathan (Jon) Walker	1.6	1,322	1,324	1,327	1,338	1,343	1,345	1,356	1,360	1,364	1,369	1,374	1,394	1,425	1,447	1,462	1,487	1,497	1,541	1,609	1,665	1,665.18									
Nonpartisan	Chris Flanary	1.5	1,242	1,248	1,253	1,258	1,267	1,273	1,287	1,300	1,302	1,317	1,327	1,337	1,345	1,396	1,450	1,471	1,525	1,559	1,608											
Nonpartisan	Melodie Beirwagen	1.3	1,132	1,133	1,138	1,140	1,145	1,156	1,160	1,171	1,176	1,183	1,196	1,209	1,252	1,266	1,275	1,304	1,326	1,396												
Nonpartisan	Matthew (Matt) Anderson	0.9	755	756	769	774	783	789	790	796	796	805	817	827	854	878	893	924	964													
Nonpartisan	Ahlam K Osman	0.8	709	716	717	718	719	725	733	745	746	749	761	767	772	784	794	827														
Nonpartisan	Heart Free Pham	0.6	546	548	557	561	567	573	578	584	589	598	606	612	632	649	661															
Nonpartisan	Luke Zak	0.6	548	551	556	559	564	570	585	594	595	601	603	612	616	633																
Nonpartisan	Brian Conley	0.6	506	507	516	525	534	539	547	552	554	566	575	581	598																	
Nonpartisan	Terry Parker	0.4	375	377	390	400	403	412	413	418	418	435	444	458																		
Nonpartisan	Dan Gilk	0.4	330	331	337	344	344	347	348	351	355	358	372																			
Nonpartisan	Christopher Brummer	0.3	263	264	264	269	271	272	274	278	279	284																				
Nonpartisan	John Sweeney	0.3	236	239	247	251	254	257	260	266	271																					
Nonpartisan	Uncertified Write In	0.3	248	249	249	249	250	250	250	251																						
Nonpartisan	Kelly Janes (KJ)	0.3	225	226	230	236	237	245	248																							
Nonpartisan	Theo Hathaway Saner	0.3	219	220	225	225	230	233																								
Nonpartisan	Jaclyn Smith-Moore	0.2	194	198	198	200	203																									
Nonpartisan	Patrick Hilton	0.2	194	198	199	200																										
Nonpartisan	David O'Connor	0.2	174	176	177																											
Nonpartisan	Kenneth (Kent) R Landgraver III	0.2	172	174																												
Nonpartisan	Clifford Higgins	0.1	104																													
Quota: 21,129
