= Morillo =

Morillo is a Spanish surname. Notable people with the surname include:

- Angelita Morillo, Paraguayan-American politician
- Erick Morillo (1971–2020), Colombian-American DJ
- Juan Morillo (athlete) (born 1972), Venezuelan sprinter
- Juan Morillo (baseball) (born 1983), Dominican Republic baseball pitcher
- Pablo Morillo (1775–1837), Spanish general
- Roberto García Morillo (1911–2003), Argentine composer
