= Sameer Kanal =

American politician

- Sameer Kanal in 2024

Member of the Portland City Council from District 2
- Incumbent
- Assumed office January 1, 2025 Serving with Dan Ryan and Elana Pirtle-Guiney
- Preceded by: office established

Personal details
- Born: Portland, Oregon
- Party: Democratic
- Education: Clark College (AA); University of Washington (BA); New York University (MS)

Sameer Kanal is an American politician who is currently member of the Portland City Council from District 2 after being elected along with Dan Ryan and Elana Pirtle-Guiney in the 2024 election. Kanal is one of the twelve inaugural members of Portland's new expanded city council after switching from a city commission government to a mayor–council government. He is one of two first Asian Americans (along with fellow council member Tiffany Koyama Lane) and first South Asian American to serve on Portland City Council.

== Early life and education ==
Kanal was born in Portland, Oregon at the Bess Kaiser Hospital that is now part of the Adidas America headquarters. He grew up in the Overlook neighborhood. His parents immigrated from India. His father was a Telecom Industry Economist, and subsequently a small business owner, and his mother worked for the State of Oregon helping new refugees.

Kanal attended Clark College and received his Associate's degree in international relations and political science. He earned a Bachelor of Arts in political science and economics from the University of Washington before getting his Master of Science degree in global affairs from New York University.

== Career ==
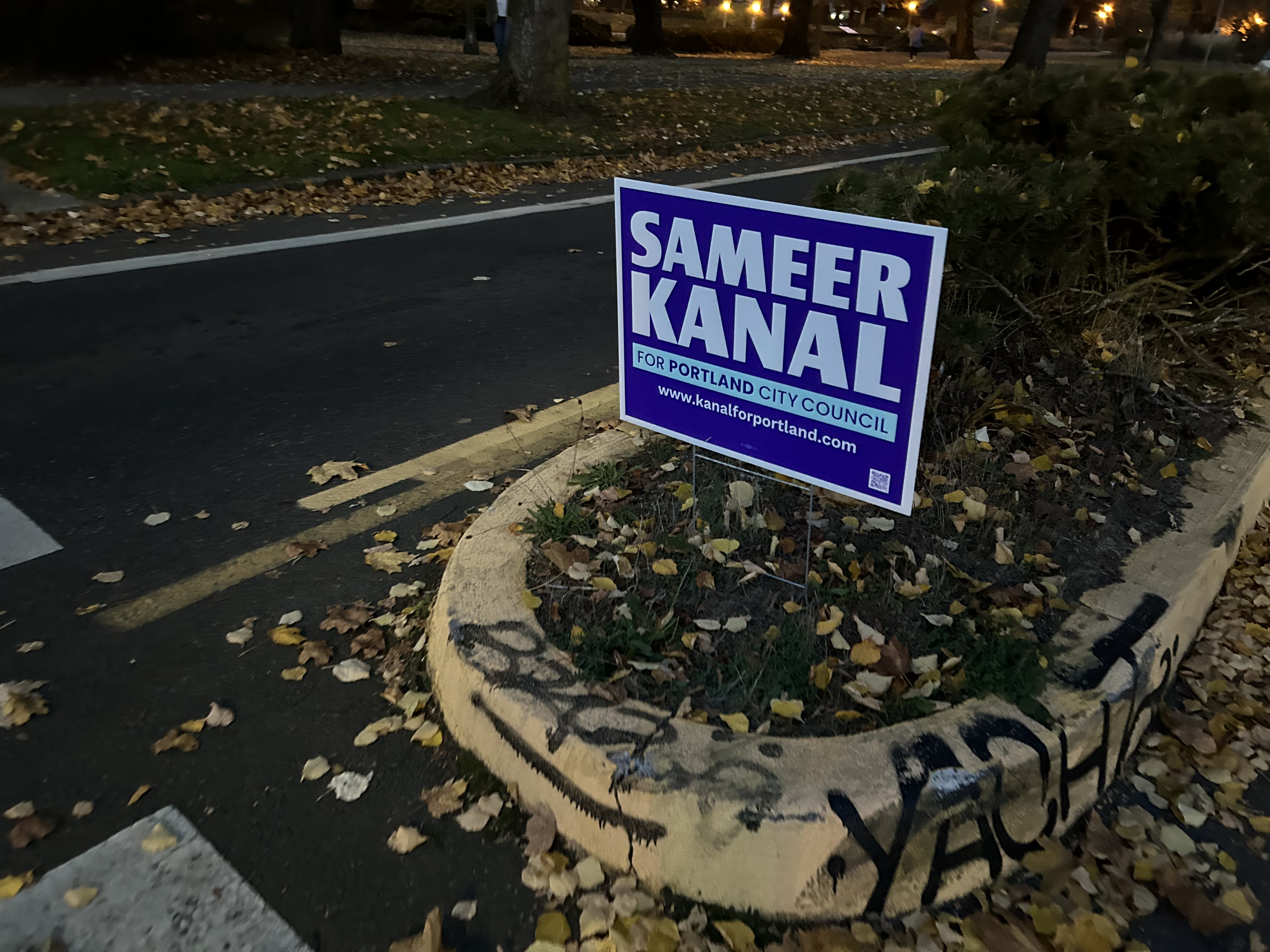
One of Kanal's yard signs for his 2024 city council campaign

On May 28, 2024, Kanal announced his intention to run for a seat on the newly expanded city council in the 2024 election.

Kanal, along with Dan Ryan and Elana Pirtle-Guiney, won the race to represent District 2, which covers North and most of Northeast Portland.

He, along with fellow council members Tiffany Koyama Lane and Angelita Morillo of District 3 and Mitch Green of District 4 and are members of the Democratic Socialists of America.

== Personal life ==
Kanal lives in the Portsmouth neighborhood.

He is a drummer, and in high school frequently performed at the Portland Saturday Market. He is a fan of the Portland Trail Blazers and is a season ticket holder for the Portland Timbers and Portland Thorns FC.

== See also ==
- List of New York University alumni
- List of people from Portland, Oregon
- List of University of Washington people
