= Dan Ryan (Oregon politician) =

American politician

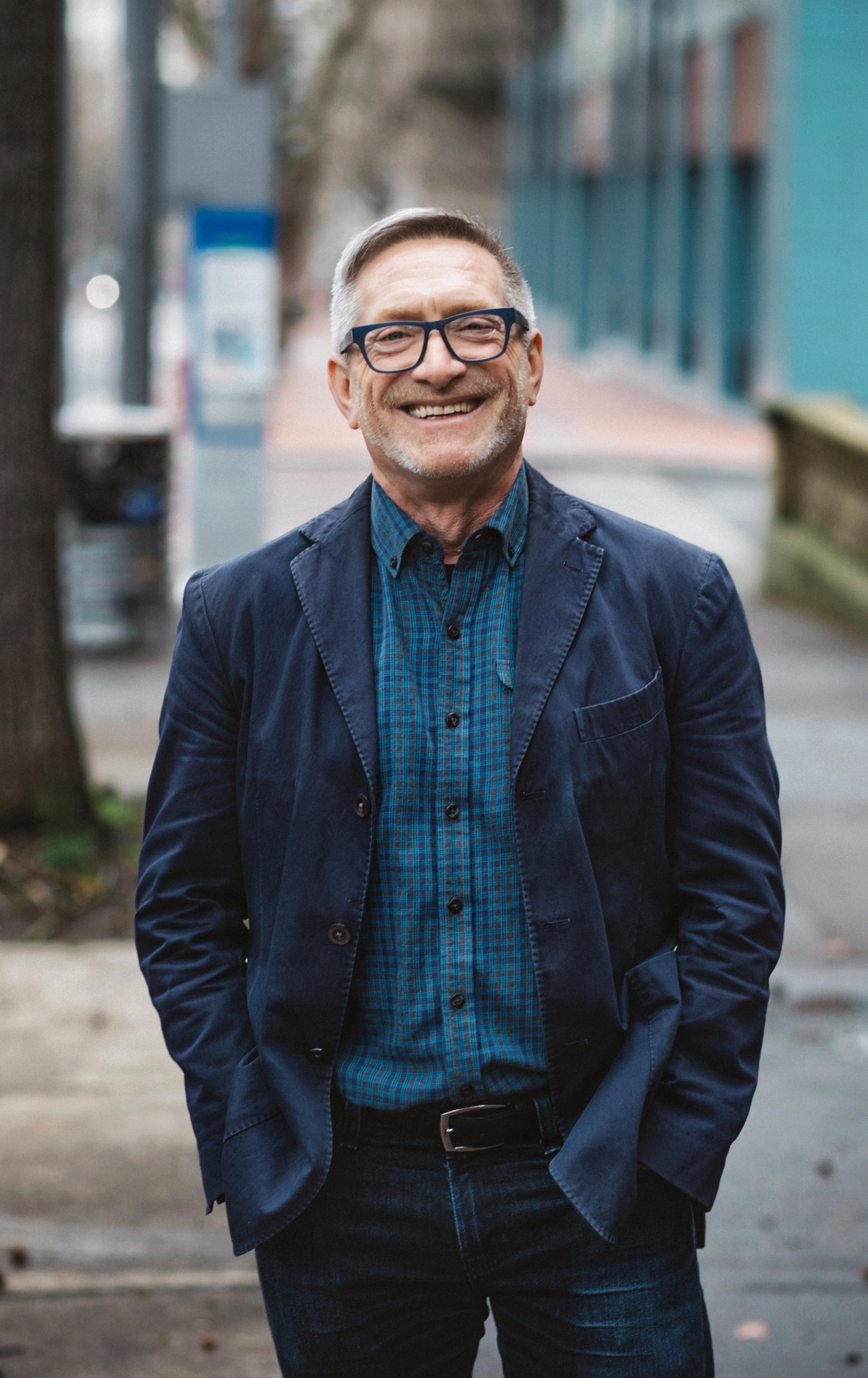
- Ryan in 2021

Member of the Portland City Council from District 2
- Incumbent
- Assumed office January 1, 2025 Serving with Sameer Kanal and Elana Pirtle-Guiney
- Preceded by: office established

Portland City Commissioner
- In office September 9, 2020 – December 31, 2024
- Preceded by: Nick Fish
- Succeeded by: office abolished

Member of the Portland Public Schools Board of Education, Zone 4
- In office 2005–2008
- Preceded by: Derry Jackson
- Succeeded by: Martin Gonzalez

Personal details
- Born: June 21, 1962 (age 63) North Portland, Oregon
- Party: Democratic
- Education: University of Oregon (BA)

Dan Ryan (born June 21, 1962) is an American non-profit executive and politician who is a member of the Portland City Council from District 2. Ryan was elected in a 2020 special election to succeed Nick Fish, who died of stomach cancer on January 2, 2020. Ryan was re-elected in 2022.

Ryan is the third LGBTQ person elected as a commissioner of Portland, and the first to have been diagnosed with HIV.

== Early life and education ==
Ryan was born in North Portland, Oregon, the youngest of eight children. Ryan was the first in his family to graduate from college. Ryan earned a Bachelor of Arts degree from the University of Oregon and took graduate courses at The New School.

== Career ==
=== Portland City Council ===
In early 2020, Commissioner Nick Fish died of stomach cancer. Ryan announced his campaign to run for the upcoming special election. He faced 17 other candidates. As the top two candidates, Ryan and former County Commissioner Loretta Smith advanced to a runoff as neither received over 50 percent of the vote. In the November runoff, Ryan prevailed with 51.2 percent of the vote. Upon his election, Ryan called for an end to the 2020 Portland protests and committed to establishing a "peace summit" between local politicians and activists. Ryan assumed office on September 9, 2020. Ryan became notable for his "safe rest village" program that involved large sites for sanctioned homeless camping. As Commissioner, Ryan oversaw Portland Parks & Recreation, the Children's Levy, and the Portland Office of Arts & Culture, among other bureaus. He formalized the Portland Park Rangers as first responders, and established Portland's first World AIDS Day Proclamation.

After Portland voted to restructure it's government from a city commission form of government to a mayor-council system in 2022, Ryan was the only incumbent Commissioner to seek re-election to the new City Council in the 2024 election.

== Personal life ==
While living in New York City in 1986, Ryan was diagnosed with HIV. In 1996, Ryan was diagnosed with pneumocystis and was given between six months and a year to live. He then returned from Seattle, where he was living at the time, to his hometown of Portland, Oregon, expecting to die soon. Ryan is openly gay.

== See also ==
- List of LGBTQ politicians in the United States
