= Portland Arts Tax =

Tax in Oregon, United States

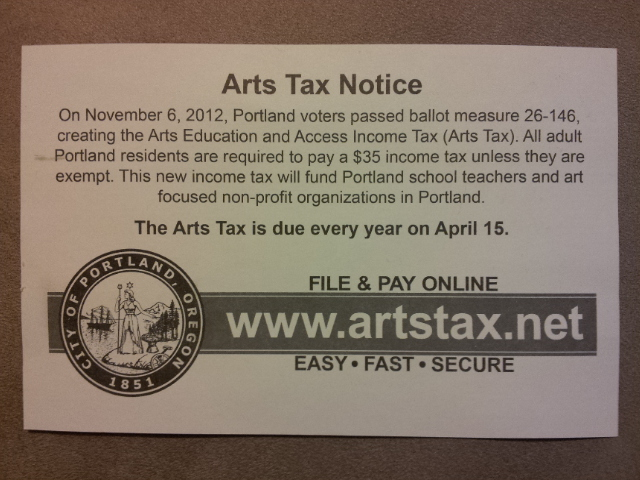
Arts tax notice in 2013

The Portland Arts Tax, formally the Arts Education and Access Income Tax, is a $35 tax paid by residents of Portland, Oregon to support school teachers and art focused nonprofit organizations. Residents age eighteen or older with $1,000 or more of taxable income are required to pay the tax. The tax was instituted when Portland voters passed Oregon Ballot Measure 26-146 in November 2012.

== History ==
Portland residents were initially required to pay the tax by April 15, 2013. However, the deadline was moved to May 15 when the city amended the tax to exempt residents who earn less than $1,000 of taxable income but live within a household with income above the federal poverty line However, on May 15, the online payment system crashed as a result of too many last-minute payments. The website to submit payments was functional one week later; June 10 became the third and final deadline to pay the tax.

The administrative-costs cap of 5% has been exceeded in every year of the tax's existence. From 2013 to 2018, the Portland Revenue Bureau reported administrative costs of 8%, with approximately 25% of Portland residents refusing to voluntarily pay. In 2018, the City Council voted unanimously to lift the administrative cap of 5%, and presented no administrative cap in its place.

=== Legal challenge ===
On March 7, 2013, Lewis & Clark Law School professor Jack Bogdanski filed a lawsuit against the City of Portland in Oregon Tax Court, claiming the arts tax was a head tax and therefore violated Article IX, section 1a of the Constitution of Oregon. On March 18, Mayor Charlie Hales asked Portland City Council to pass an "emergency" ordinance amending the language of the tax to exempt residents with an income under $1,000.

On June 4, the Oregon Tax Court dismissed Bogdanski's lawsuit. The Court did not uphold the tax's constitutionality, but rather ruled that the city tax was not within its jurisdiction. The ruling stated: "The court concludes that it does not have the statutory authority to hear Plaintiff's challenge to the City of Portland's tax. That is so because jurisdiction must start with a challenge to a tax law administered by the state and the Portland Arts Tax is not a tax law of the state, but rather a municipal tax law." Bogdanski vowed to appeal the decision to a regular judge of the Court, or even to the Oregon Supreme Court.

=== Oregon Supreme Court ===
On March 6, 2017, retired attorney George Wittemyer argued the constitutionality of the tax before the Oregon Supreme Court. On September 21, 2017, the Oregon Supreme Court ruled against Wittemeyer, saying the tax was not unconstitutional. Wittemeyer, like Bogdanski, had also argued that the art tax constituted an unconstitutional head tax. The court disagreed, saying that because the tax takes income into account (i.e., no tax for under $1000 taxable income), "the city's art tax is not a prohibited 'poll or head tax.'"

== See also ==
- List of Oregon ballot measures
