= Steve Novick =

American lawyer (born 1963)

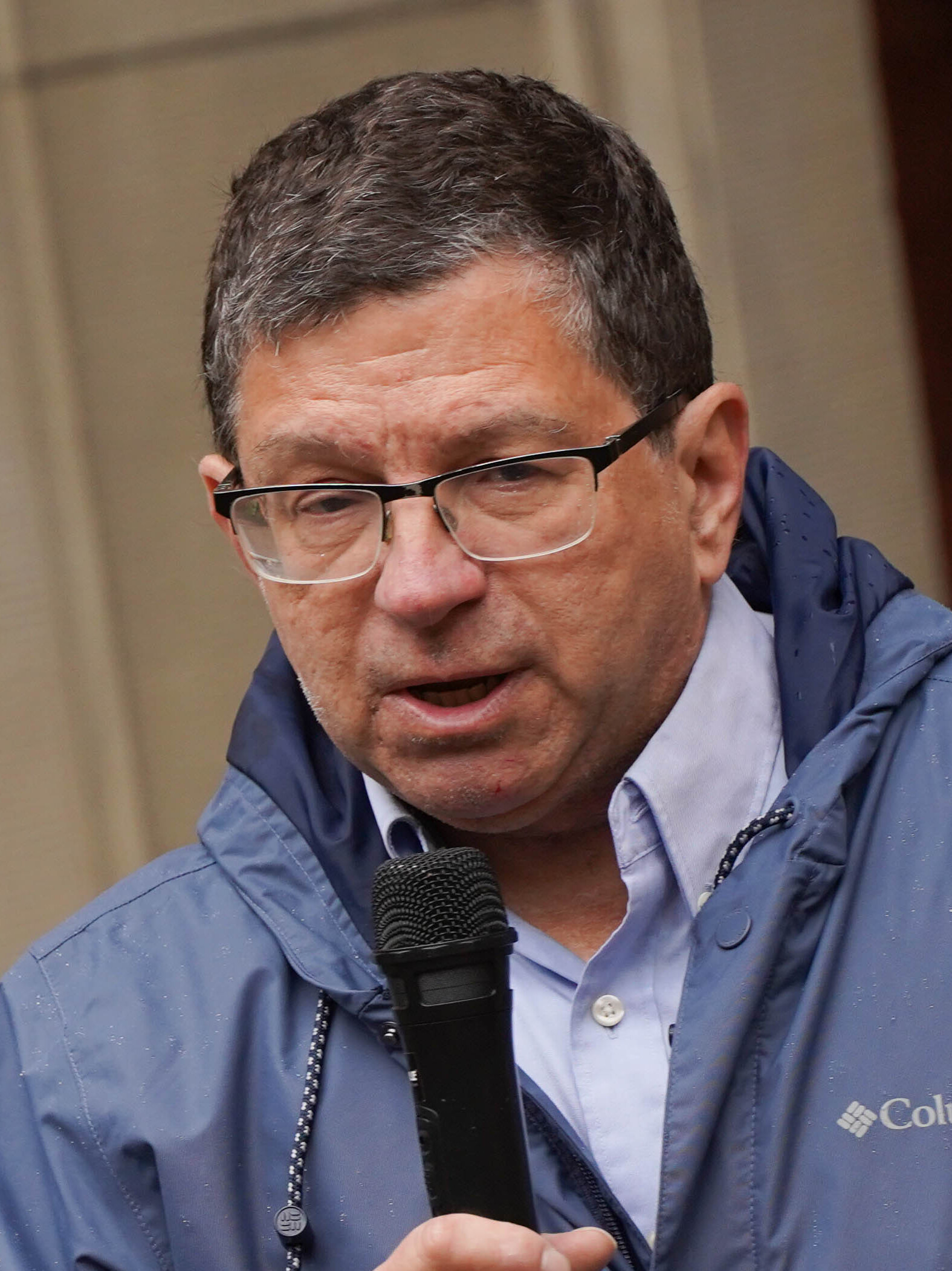
- Novick in 2024

Member of the Portland City Council from District 3
- Incumbent
- Assumed office January 1, 2025 Serving with Angelita Morillo and Tiffany Koyama Lane
- Preceded by: Office established

Portland City Commissioner
- In office January 1, 2013 – January 1, 2017
- Preceded by: Randy Leonard
- Succeeded by: Chloe Eudaly

Personal details
- Born: February 8, 1963 (age 63) Newark, New Jersey, U.S.
- Party: Democratic
- Education: University of Oregon; Harvard Law School
- Occupation: Politician

Steven Novick (born February 8, 1963) is an American politician, attorney, and activist from the U.S. state of Oregon. In 2008, he was a candidate for U.S. Senate for the seat then held by Republican Gordon Smith, but narrowly lost the primary to Jeff Merkley. He served as a Portland City Commissioner from 2013 to 2017. On the city council, he was in charge of the city's transportation department, among other responsibilities.

Novick ran for re-election to the city council in 2016, but lost to Chloe Eudaly. In 2018, he became an attorney for the Oregon Department of Justice. He successfully ran for a seat on Portland City Council in 2024 in District 3 during the city's transition from a commission form of government to a mayor-council government.

== Early life ==
Novick was born in Newark, New Jersey, in 1963. His parents, a waitress and a union organizer, moved the family to Cottage Grove, Oregon, in 1973.

Novick was born with significant physical disabilities, including a missing left hand and missing fibula bones in his legs. As a result, he uses a hook prosthesis and stands approximately 4 feet 9 inches (1.45 m) tall. His disabilities have prompted him to use the slogan "The Fighter with the Hard Left Hook." His levity about his physical stature has drawn both positive and negative reviews from the press.

In 1977, after low funding caused Novick's junior high school to close, he enrolled at the University of Oregon. After graduating at age 18, he attended Harvard Law School, earning a Juris Doctor at age 21.

== Career ==
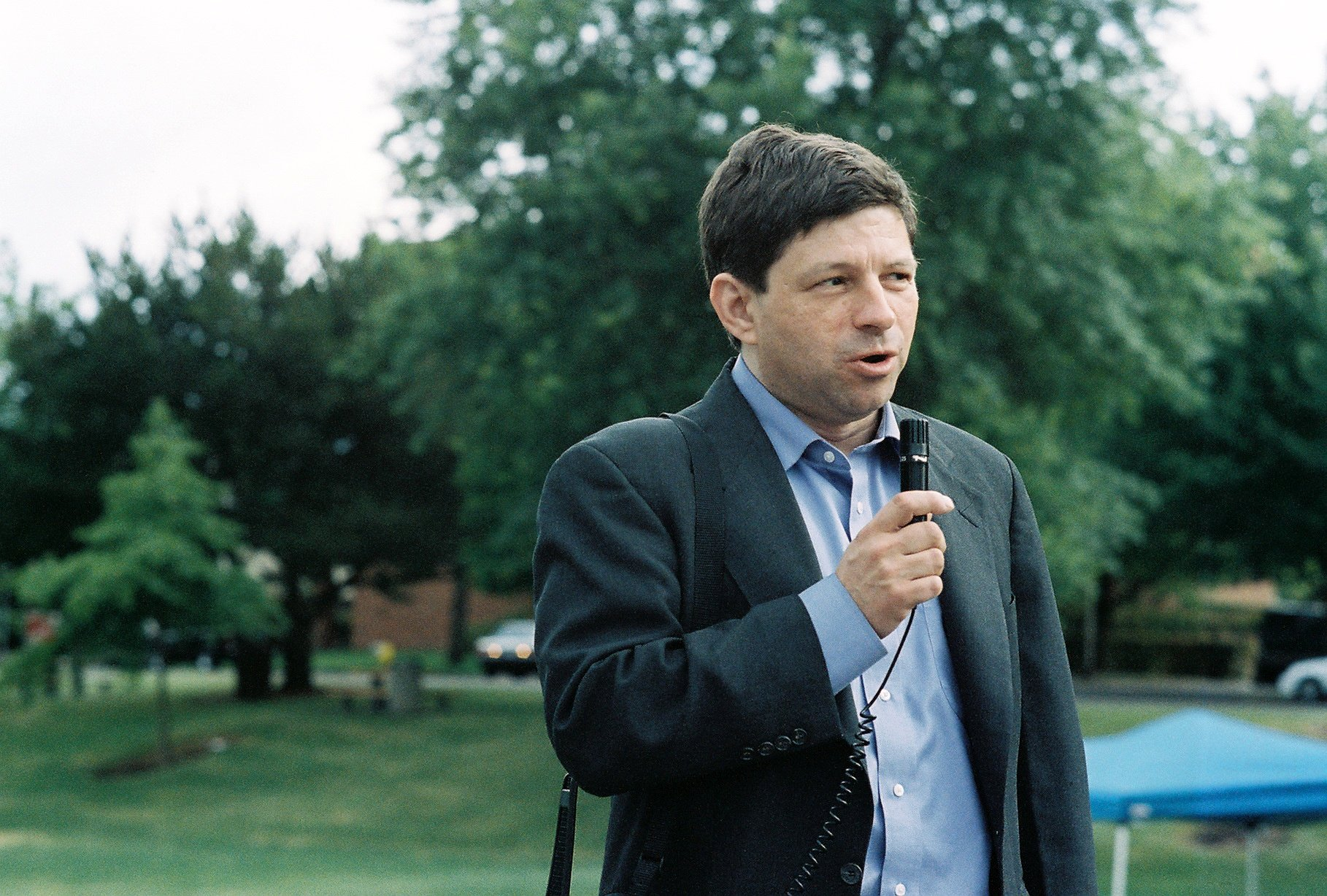
Novick in 2007

Novick is an attorney and former U.S. Department of Justice litigator. He spent nearly ten years arguing on behalf of the Environmental Protection Agency (EPA), culminating in the Love Canal case in upstate New York, on which he served as lead counsel.

Beginning in 1999, Novick focused on the Oregon Lottery's payments to retailers, which he contended were illegally high. He and other education advocates brought a lawsuit challenging the lottery's payment, the lawsuit was successful at the Oregon Court of Appeals. The Oregon Supreme Court overturned the decision, declaring the Lottery's payments legal.

== Senate candidacy ==
On April 18, 2007, Novick formally announced his candidacy for Senate. In his announcement, he stated that he didn't "want to wake up 10 years from now" and realize he had missed his chance. He drew on his own unique persona from the start. "Oregon's working families need someone to fight for them- and a fighter needs a hard left hook." On July 1, 2007, Novick announced that he had raised $190,000 in contributions during the first ten weeks of his campaign and was adding two paid campaign staff members.

By the end of 2007, Federal Election Commission records showed that Novick had raised a total of $563,000 from 2100 donors, with an average donation of $258. At the time of filing, he had $293,000 on hand.

On January 11, 2008, Novick released his first TV ad, a 30-second biographical spot that parodied the famous game show To Tell the Truth. The ad was produced and created by the firm of Eichenbaum & Associates, which also created the ads used in Wisconsin U.S. Senator Russ Feingold's three successful statewide campaigns.

Novick ended up with 41 percent of the vote in the Democratic primary, finishing a close second to Jeff Merkley. He endorsed Merkley and campaigned for him in the general election.

== Political positions ==
Novick spoke against the Iraq War in 2003, calling it "an oil grab and public-relations gimmick, sold on false pretenses, which is now producing $4 billion a month's worth of chaos."

He accused Gordon Smith of changing his stance on illegal immigration to appease conservative voters. Novick stated, "It shows that he's willing to do what it takes to get reelected. And if doing what it takes means punishing innocent children and turning against his previous so-called moderation on immigration, that's what he will do."

Novick has advocated for the removal of the cap on Social Security taxes for income above $100,000. He has stated that borrowing against the Federal retirement program has threatened the program's longevity and solvency.

== Portland City Council ==
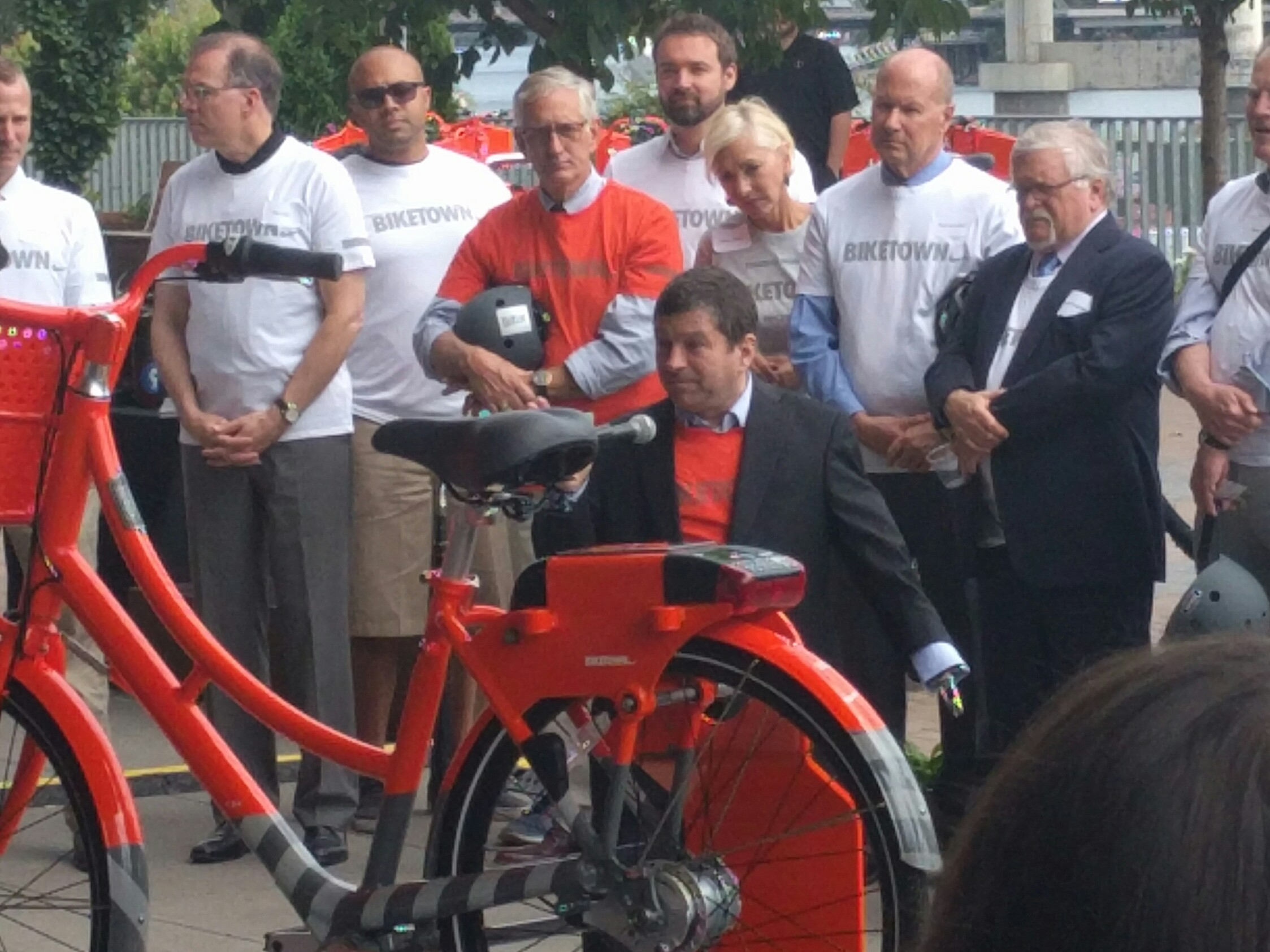
Novick speaks at the launch event for Biketown

In June 2011, Novick announced his intention to run for Portland City Council in 2012, for the seat then held by Randy Leonard, who had indicated he would not run for re-election. In the primary election, held on May 15, 2012, Novick received more than 75% of the vote, winning him the seat outright, for a term of office to begin the following January. In Portland municipal elections, any candidate receiving more than 50% of the vote in a primary election wins the race outright and the contest does not proceed to the November general election. Novick was sworn in as a Portland City Commissioner (city council member) on January 1, 2013.

In June 2013, after a four-month period in which new Mayor Charlie Hales temporarily moved all city bureaus (departments) under his own oversight, Hales assigned bureaus to the other four commissioners. Novick was given responsibility for the Portland Transportation Bureau and the bureaus of Emergency Management and Emergency Communications.

Novick ran for re-election in 2016 but lost to Chloe Eudaly, who consequently was scheduled to succeed him on the council in January 2017.

Novick announced his intention to run for Portland's reorganized City Council in the 2024 election. Novick was elected to represent District 3 in the November 2024 election, serving alongside Tiffany Koyama Lane and Angelita Morillo.
