= Tiffany Koyama Lane =

American politician

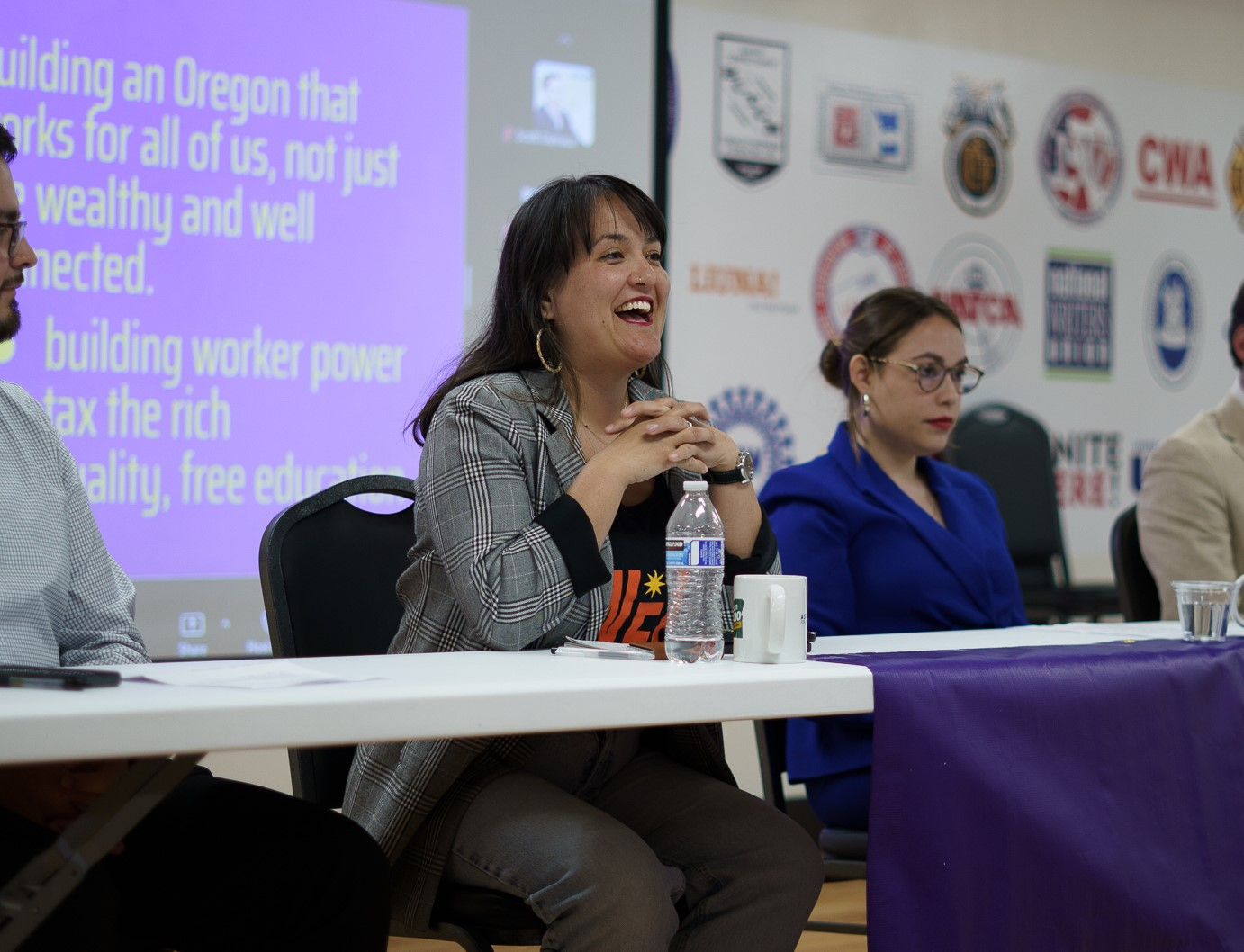
- Koyama Lane in 2026

Vice President of the Portland City Council
- In office January 2, 2025 – January 14, 2026
- President: Elana Pirtle-Guiney
- Preceded by: office established
- Succeeded by: Olivia Clark

Member of the Portland City Council from District 3
- Incumbent
- Assumed office January 1, 2025 Serving with Steve Novick and Angelita Morillo
- Preceded by: office established

Personal details
- Party: Democratic, Working Families
- Education: University of Oregon

Tiffany Koyama Lane is a member of Portland City Council from District 3 after being elected along with Steve Novick and Angelita Morillo in the 2024 election. Koyama Lane is one of the twelve inaugural members of Portland's new expanded city council after switching from a city commission government to a mayor–council government.

She is the first Asian American (jointly with Sameer Kanal) as well as the first Asian American woman to serve on Portland City Council. She is a mother, a teacher, and a fourth-generation Japanese American.

== Early life and education ==
Koyama Lane studied education at the University of Oregon in Eugene, Oregon.

== Career ==
Koyama Lane has worked as a teacher at Sunnyside Elementary School in Sunnyside, Portland and served as the lead organizer for the Portland Association of Teachers for two years. She, along with fellow council members Sameer Kanal of District 2, Angelita Morillo of District 3, and Mitch Green of District 4 are members of the Democratic Socialists of America.

=== 2024 City Council Campaign ===
She received endorsements from many working class and progressive organizations and individuals, such as Teamsters Council No.37, SEIU Oregon, UFCW 555, multiple teachers' unions, Portland DSA, Portland Gray Panthers, many former commissioners, and Oregon state representatives among others. During her first campaign she supported the Renters’ Bill of Rights, the Portland Clean Energy Fund, and increased funding for alternatives to community safety such as Portland Street Response and TriMet's Safety Response Teams. She signed a petition along with other fellow city council members to refuse campaign funding from police unions. She is neighbors with Lydia Kiesling, whom she hired to manage her successful 2024 Portland City Council campaign.

=== As City Councilor ===
Koyama Lane was elected on November 5, 2024, to City Council District 3. She was elected by her fellow Portland City Council members to be the first council vice president at the group's first meeting on January 2, 2025, after Elana Pirtle-Guiney was selected as council president. She is the chair of the Governance Committee and sit on the Transportation and Infrastructure Committee.

In April 2025, she, along with councilors Mitch Green, Candace Avalos, and Sameer Kanal, introduced a bill to issue a study into the feasibility of implementing social housing policies to address Portland's homelessness & housing crisis.

On September 4, 2025, she officially filed to run for reelection to Portland City Council and announced it via social media.

== See also ==
- List of people from Portland, Oregon
- List of University of Oregon alumni
