= Woodlawn, Portland, Oregon =

Woodlawn
- Neighborhood
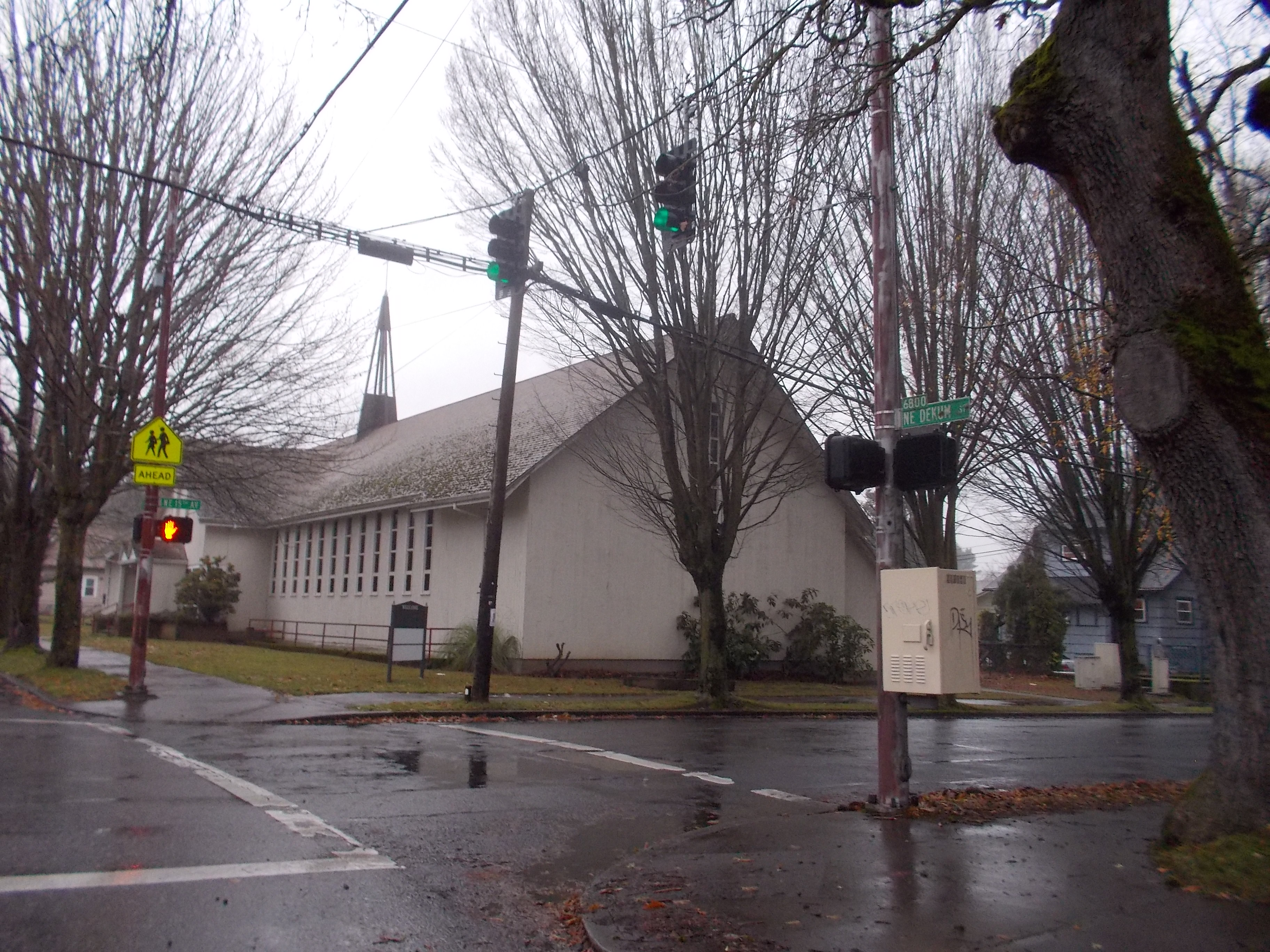
- Woodlawn Methodist Church
- Location in Portland
- Coordinates: 45°34′18″N 122°39′06″W
- Country: United States
- State: Oregon
- City: Portland

Government
  - Association: Woodlawn Neighborhood Association
  - Coalition: Northeast Coalition of Neighborhoods

Area
  - Total: 0.73 sq mi (1.90 km^{2})

Population (2000)
  - Total: 4,889
  - Density: 6,660/sq mi (2,570/km^{2})

Housing
  - No. of households: 1854
  - Occupancy rate: 93% occupied
  - Owner-occupied: 1231 households (66%)
  - Renting: 623 households (34%)
  - Avg. household size: 2.64 persons

Woodlawn is a neighborhood in the Northeast section of Portland, Oregon. It borders Sunderland on the north, Concordia on the east, King and Vernon on the south, and Piedmont on the west.

Most residents of Woodlawn are members of minority groups; in the 2000 census, 43.0% of residents identified themselves as African-American, 35.0% as white, 8.5% as Hispanic, and 10.1% other categories.

Like other neighborhoods in the NE quadrant of Portland, Woodlawn is undergoing a period of gentrification. For example, on the 12th avenue block between Ainsworth and Holman streets, 15 houses are owner-occupied while 5 are tenant-occupied.

Most homes in Woodlawn are working-class style, small bungalows, unlike the neighboring King and Piedmont neighborhoods.
