= Sunderland, Portland, Oregon =

Sunderland
- Neighborhood
- Location in Portland
- Coordinates: 45°34′59″N 122°38′20″W
- Country: United States
- State: Oregon
- City: Portland

Government
  - Association: Sunderland Neighborhood Association
  - Coalition: Central Northeast Neighbors, Inc.

Area
  - Total: 1.88 sq mi (4.88 km^{2})

Population (2010)
  - Total: 718
  - Density: 381/sq mi (147/km^{2})

Housing
  - No. of households: 43
  - Occupancy rate: 95% occupied
  - Owner-occupied: 25 households (58%)
  - Renting: 16 households (37%)
  - Avg. household size: 16.70 persons

Sunderland is a neighborhood in the northeast section of Portland, Oregon, United States. It is bordered by the Columbia River to the north; Woodlawn and Concordia to the south; Portland International Airport and Cully to the east; and East Columbia to the west. There is a city sanctioned transient encampment called Dignity Village in Sunderland between a state prison and the airport.
