= East Columbia, Portland, Oregon =

East Columbia
- Neighborhood
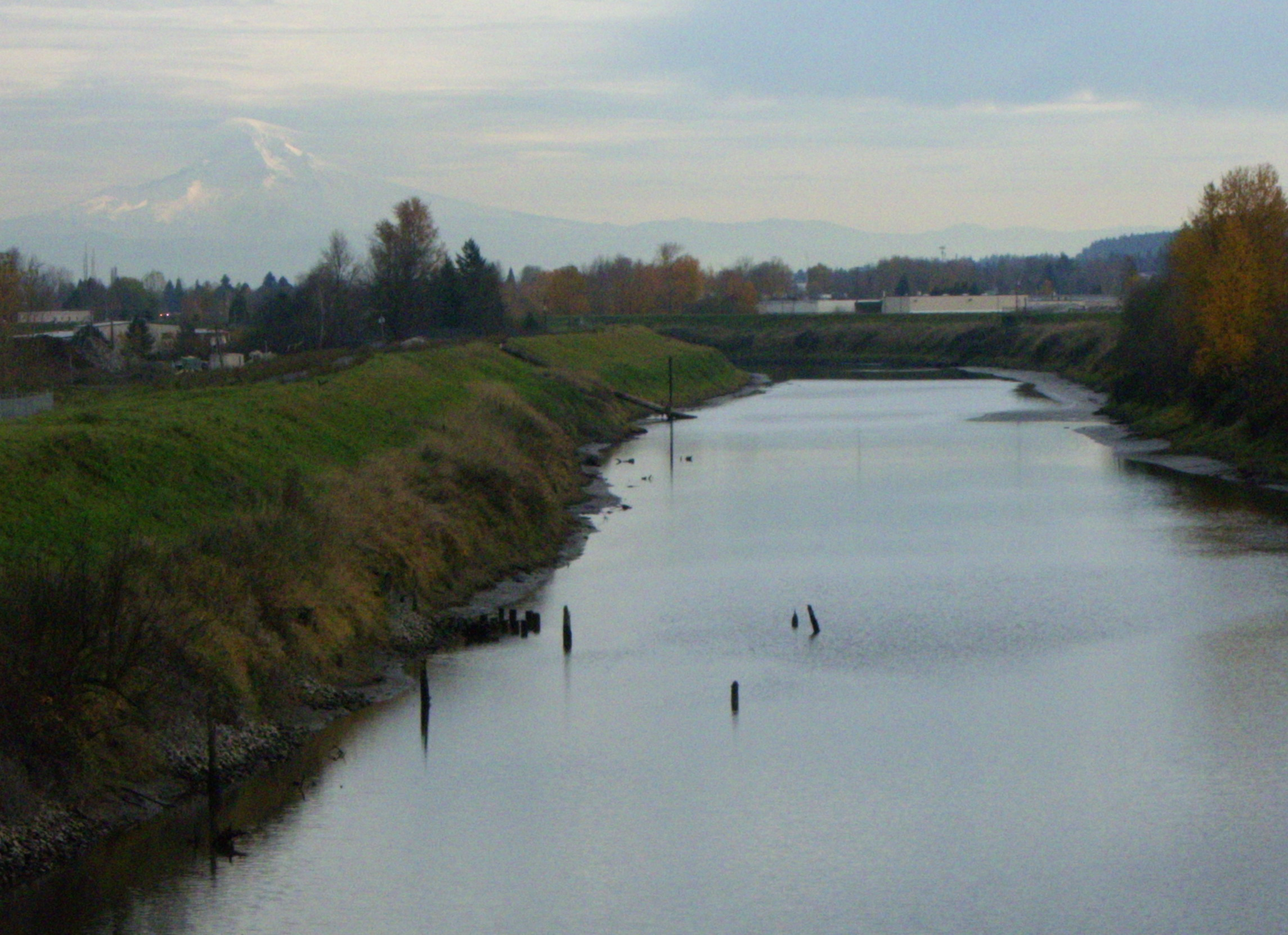
- The Columbia Slough in East Columbia
- Interactive map of East Columbia
- Coordinates: 45°35′41″N 122°39′07″W
- Country: United States
- State: Oregon
- City: Portland

Government
  - Association: East Columbia Neighborhood Association
  - Coalition: Northeast Coalition of Neighborhoods

Area
  - Total: 2.28 sq mi (5.9 km^{2})

Population (2020)
  - Total: 2,205
  - Density: 967/sq mi (373/km^{2})

Housing
  - No. of households: 873
  - Occupancy rate: 95% occupied
  - Owner-occupied: 34%
  - Renting: 55 households (20%)
  - Avg. household size: 2.5 persons

East Columbia is a neighborhood in North and Northeast Portland, Oregon, located on the Columbia River floodplain. It borders Sunderland to the southwest, Piedmont and the Columbia Slough to the south, and Kenton to the west. To the north, it borders Bridgeton and the Columbia River. Much of East Columbia is made up of wetlands and industrial space, though there is more open space and residential areas towards the east.

The neighborhood includes the Columbia Children's Arboretum and the Columbia Edgewater Golf Club.

== History ==
The first European settler to arrive in the area of East Columbia was John Switzler in 1855, who operated the first post office there as well as the first Portland-Vancouver ferry.

The first school, Columbia School, was opened in 1907. The neighborhood originally had its own school district, Columbia School District, which operated from 1920 to 1964, when it was absorbed into Portland Public Schools. After the school district was discontinued, the original Columbia School was turned into the Columbia Children's Arboretum, which was owned by multiple organizations until Portland Parks & Recreation took over in 1999.

Dikes and flood protection have been in East Columbia since 1905. However, after the Vanport Flood in 1948, they were strengthened.

East Columbia was annexed by the City of Portland in the early 1970s, and the East Columbia Neighborhood Association was formed in 1977.

== Demographics ==
According to the 2020 US Census, East Columbia's racial makeup is non-Hispanic/Latino White 46%, Hispanic/Latino 25.9%, other 19.7%, Black/African American 12.5%, Asian 8.4%, American Indian/Alaska Native 4.6%, and Native Hawaiian 2.2%.

Historical population
Census	Pop.	Note	%±
1990	474		—
2000	753		58.9%
2010	1,772		135.3%
2020	2,205		24.4%
