= Elana Pirtle-Guiney =

American politician

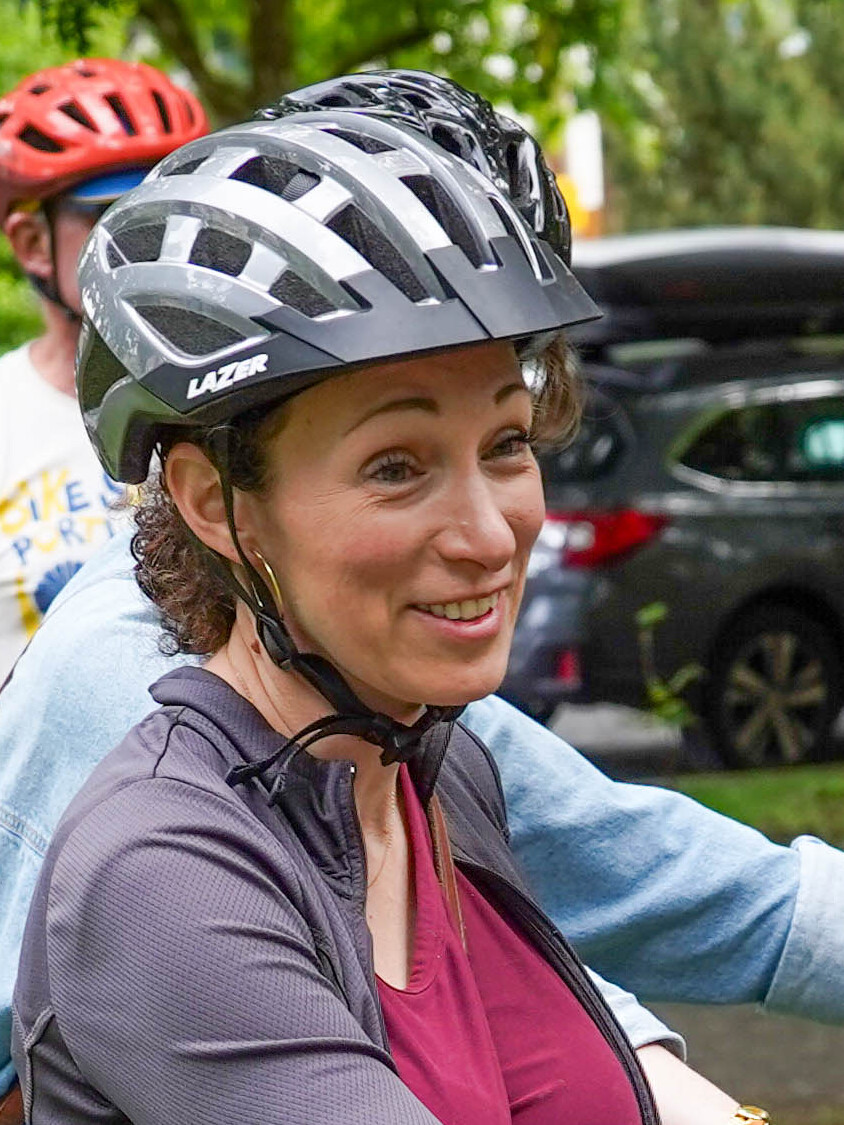
- Pirtle-Guiney in 2025

President of the Portland City Council
- In office January 2, 2025 – January 14, 2026
- Vice President: Tiffany Koyama Lane
- Preceded by: Office established
- Succeeded by: Jamie Dunphy

Member of the Portland City Council from District 2
- Incumbent
- Assumed office January 1, 2025 Serving with Sameer Kanal and Dan Ryan
- Preceded by: office established

Personal details
- Party: Democratic
- Education: Lewis & Clark College (BA)
- Website: Official website

Elana Pirtle-Guiney is an American politician and labor organizer who is currently serving as a member of the Portland City Council. She represents District 2 on the City Council, along with Sameer Kanal and Dan Ryan, and was first elected in 2024. Pirtle-Guiney previously served as the inaugural president of the City Council from 2025 to 2026.

Pirtle-Guiney is one of the twelve inaugural members of Portland's new expanded city council, following Portland's switch from a city commission government to a mayor–council government.

== Early life and education ==
Pirtle-Guiney grew up in California. She earned a Bachelor of Arts degree in international affairs from Lewis & Clark College.

== Career ==
Pirtle-Guiney was the legislative and communications director for the Oregon AFL-CIO for nine years. Following this, she served as a policy advisor and later legislative director for Governor Kate Brown from 2015 to 2021. She served as a special advisor to the Oregon Commissioner of Labor from November 2021 to June 2022.

=== Portland City Council ===
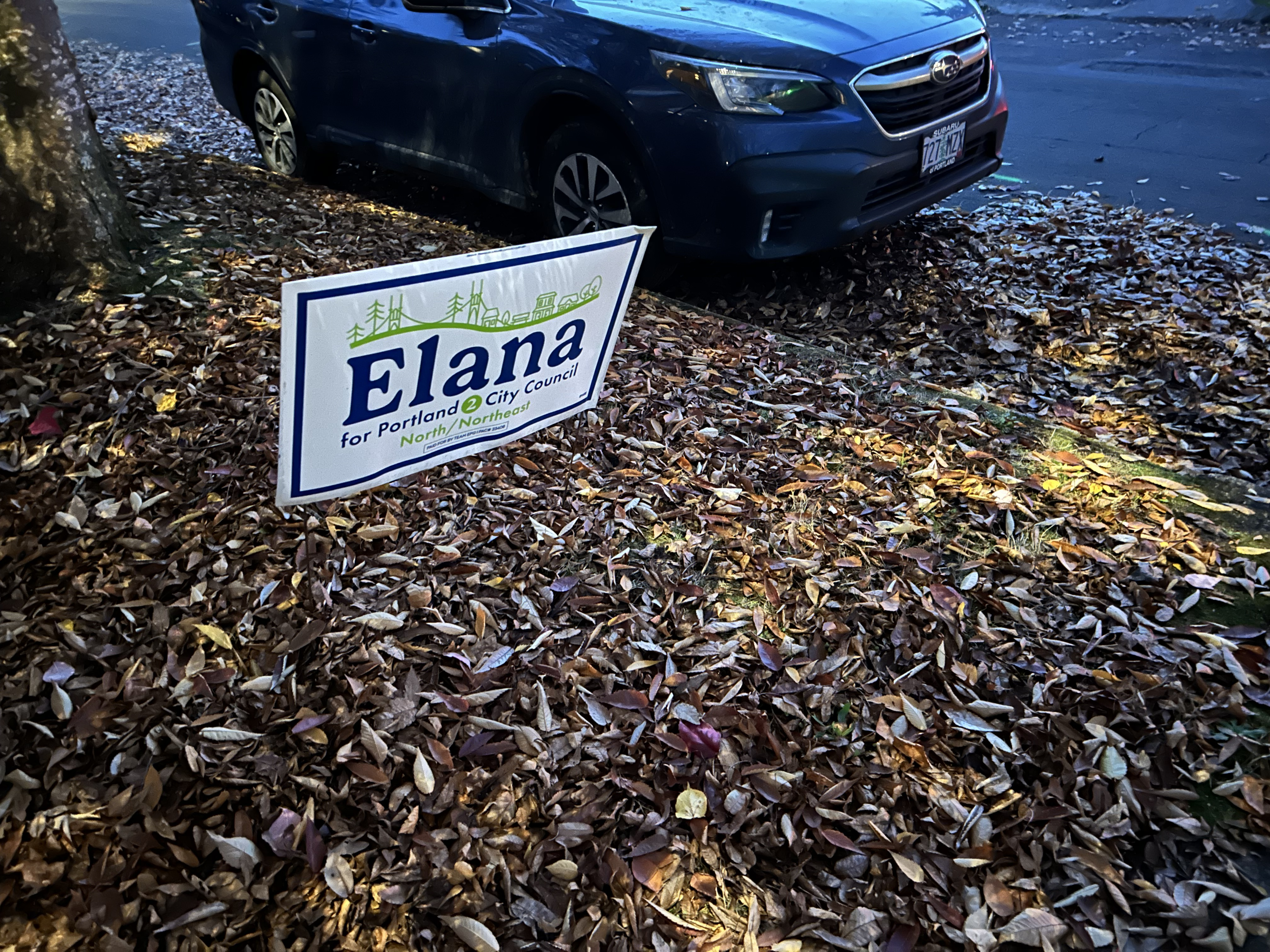
Campaign sign for Pirtle-Guiney's 2024 city council campaign

On June 20, 2024, Pirtle-Guiney announced her run for city council in the newly formed district 2. She was one of over 100 candidates in the 2024 election for the new city council, which was switching from a city commission form of government to a mayor–council form of government.

Pirtle-Guiney won the election along with Sameer Kanal and Dan Ryan. She was second place to Ryan in the first count, with 7,833 votes. In the final round, her, Ryan, and Kanal shared 19,200 votes.

On January 2, 2025, after 10 rounds of voting, Pirtle-Guiney was selected in a 7-5 vote of the Portland City Council to become the first person ever to serve as Council President since the 1800s, with Tiffany Koyama Lane selected to serve as council Vice President. Pirtle-Guiney ran for president again in 2026 but was unable to secure a majority in 13 rounds of closely divided voting.

== Personal life ==
Pirtle-Guiney is openly queer. She lives in the Vernon neighborhood in Northeast Portland.

== See also ==
- List of LGBTQ politicians in the United States
- List of people from Portland, Oregon
  - List of LGBTQ people from Portland, Oregon
