= Portland Housing Bureau =

Municipal agency in Portland, Oregon, U.S.

Agency overview
- Type: Bureau
- Jurisdiction: Portland, Oregon, U.S.
- Agency executive: Helmi A. Hisserich, Director
- Parent Service Area: Community & economic development
- Website: www.portland.gov/phb

The Portland Housing Bureau (PHB) is a municipal agency in Portland, Oregon, United States. The bureau constructs and maintains affordable housing, educates and assists underserved Portlanders with home buying, and manages programs to prevent home loss.

Helmi A. Hisserich took over directorship in 2024.

== Actions ==
In a May 2024 audit report from the city's auditor, PHB's affordable housing program fell short of goals.

In 2025, the bureau began construction of affordable housing in the Jade District that will support Portlanders making 30-60 percent of the area's median income. This comes after the bureau received money from a federal grant early this year.

== See also ==
- Affordable housing in the United States
