= Angelita Morillo =

American politician

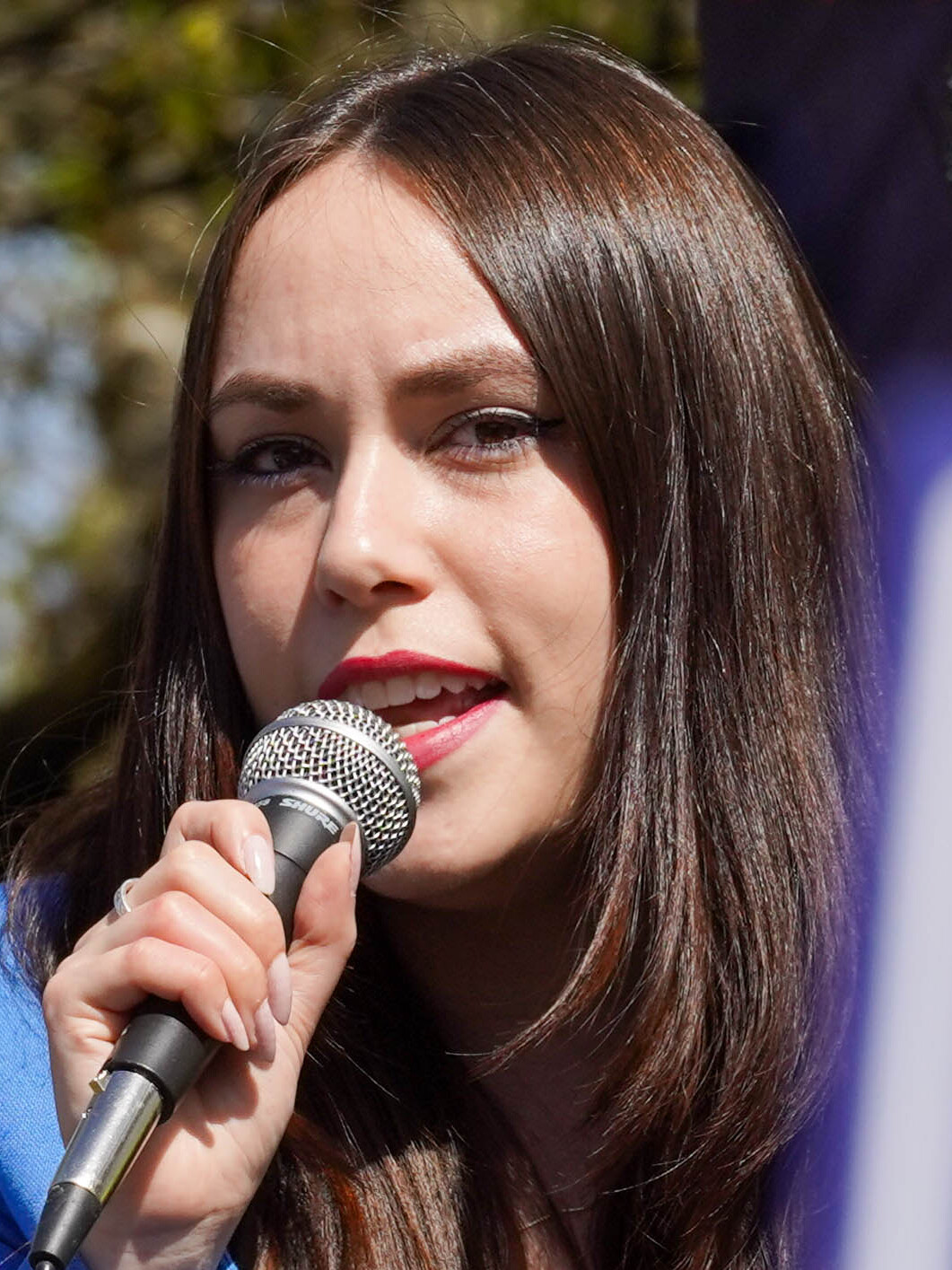
- Morillo in 2025

Member of Portland City Council from District 3
- Incumbent
- Assumed office January 1, 2025 Serving with Steve Novick and Tiffany Koyama Lane
- Preceded by: office established

Personal details
- Born: 1995 or 1996 (age 29–30) Paraguay
- Education: Portland State University (BA)

Angelita Morillo is an American politician serving as a member of Portland City Council from District 3. She was elected in 2024 during Portland's first municipal election using proportional ranked choice voting to elect its City Council members from multi-member districts. She assumed office on January 1, 2025. Morillo is running for re-election in 2026 and had received more than $160,000 from Portland's Small Donor Election program by September because of contributions by more than 1,600 Portland residents.

== Early life and education ==
As a child, Morillo emigrated from Paraguay to the United States with her family. She attended Lincoln High School, where she won nationals with the constitution team in 2014. She earned a Bachelor of Arts degree in political science from Portland State University. While she was a student at PSU, Morillo lost her housing and slept on friends' couches and in parks and stairwells for a little less than a year.

== Career ==
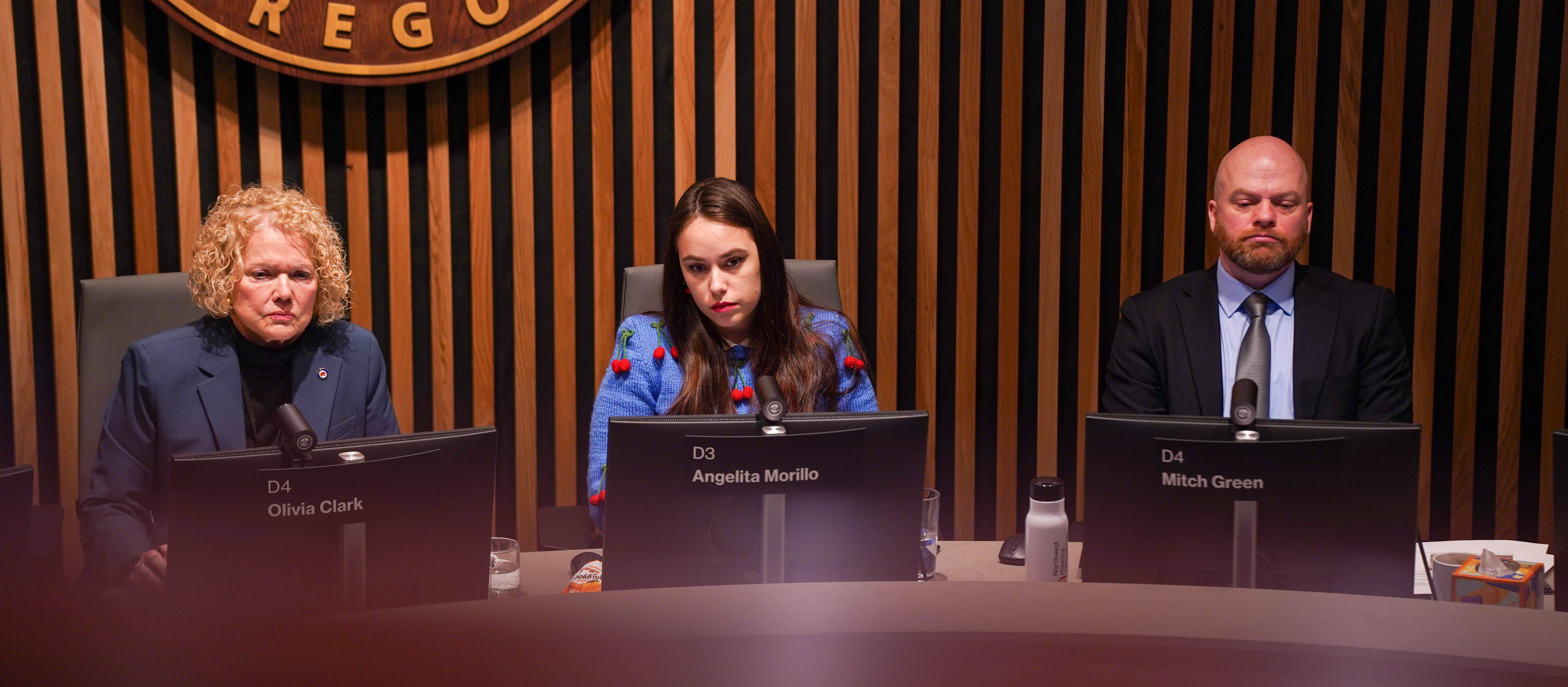
Morillo (center) attends a Transportation and Infrastructure Committee meeting in 2025

Morillo first became publicly known because of her Tiktok account, where she makes videos discussing Portland politics and had 34,000 followers as of 2024. In September 2026, her Tiktok account had over 51,000 followers and her Instagram account had over 20,000 followers.

After graduating from college, Morillo worked in Comissioner JoAnn Hardesty's office for three years, fielding constituent calls and emails. She later worked for Partners for a Hunger Free Oregon and served on the Portland Rental Services Commission. She was among the first people to declare their run for Portland City Council in August 2023.

Morillo joined the Portland chapter of the Democratic Socialists of America after taking office in 2025, and gained the chapter's endorsement in the 2026 election.

=== Portland City Council ===
In June 2025, Morillo and Councilors Sameer Kanal and Candace Avalos introduced a successful city council resolution that established Portland Street Response as a co-equal branch of the public safety system and a 24/7, citywide service, as well as expanding the types of calls that the service responded to.

In November 2025, Morillo proposed a resolution that would ban the sale or use of algorithmic price-fixing software by landlords to coordinate with each other to raise rental rates in Portland. The resolution, after being amended to reduce impacts on some landlords who own a small portfolio of rental properties, passed in a 8-4 vote.

In April 2026, Morillo, along with Councillors Candace Avalos, Jamie Dunphy, and Mitch Green, introduced a technical adjustment ordinance to direct $56 million unused Portland Housing Bureau funds towards rent assistance, a revolving loan fund for affordable housing projects and for the city to acquire property as part of a new push for a social housing, eviction defense, buying down rents on some affordable housing buildings to permanently reduce rents, and closing the gap on funding for two other affordable housing projects. The council approved the ordinance with 8 votes in favor.

== Personal life ==
Morillo resides in southeast Portland's Buckman neighborhood. She has never owned a car and depends on TriMet to get around

Morillo is openly queer and uses the pronouns she/they. She is bisexual.

== See also ==
- List of LGBTQ politicians in the United States
- List of people from Portland, Oregon
  - List of LGBTQ people from Portland, Oregon
- List of Portland State University alumni
