= Concordia, Portland, Oregon =

Concordia
- Neighborhood
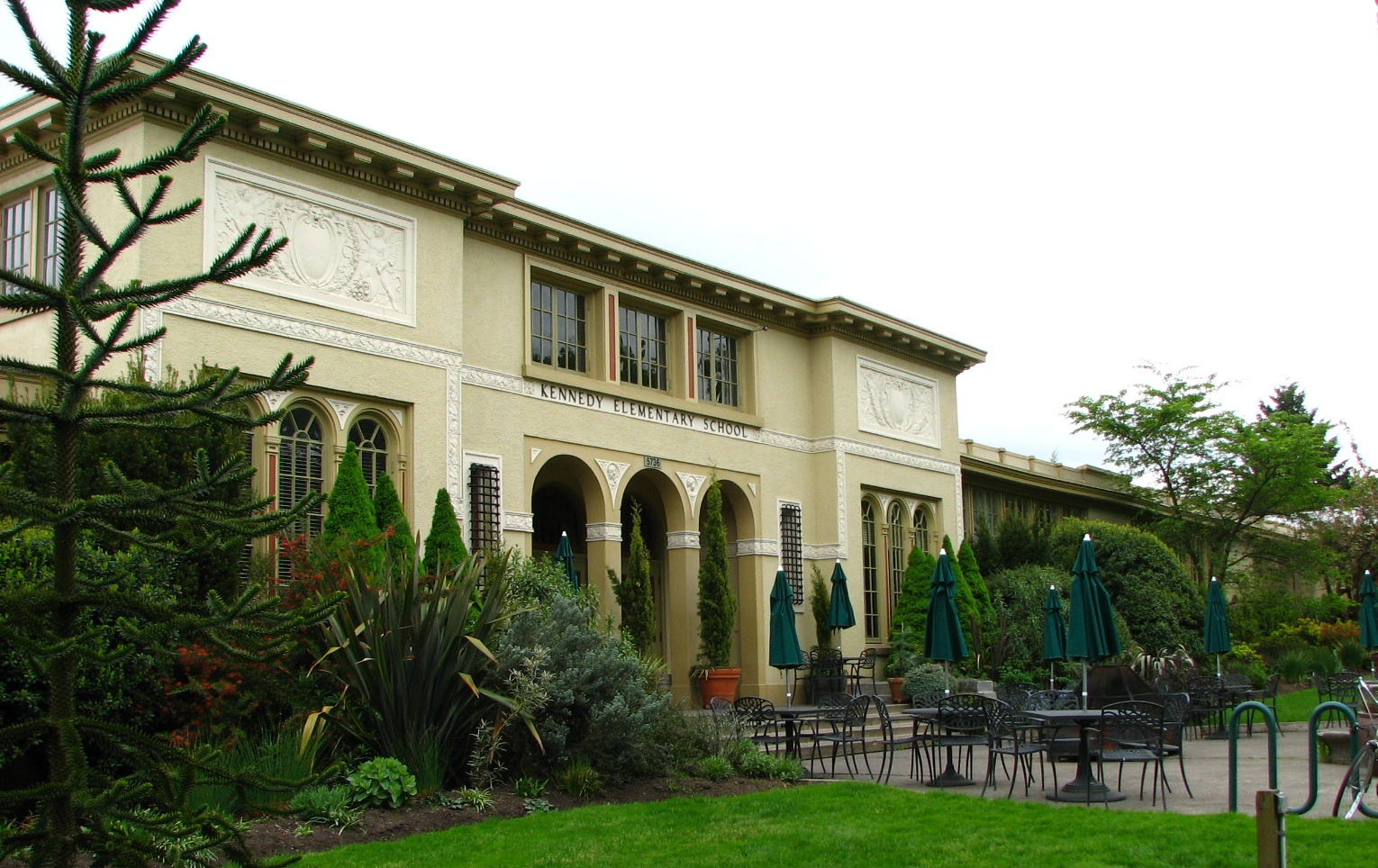
- The Kennedy School restaurant and hotel in the Concordia neighborhood
- Interactive map of Concordia
- Coordinates: 45°33′59″N 122°37′50″W
- Country: United States
- State: Oregon
- City: Portland

Government
  - Association: Concordia Neighborhood Association
  - Coalition: Northeast Coalition of Neighborhoods

Area
  - Total: 1.33 sq mi (3.4 km^{2})

Population (2020)
  - Total: 10,238
  - Density: 7,698/sq mi (2,972/km^{2})

Housing
  - No. of households: 4117
  - Occupancy rate: 93.9% occupied
  - Owner-occupied: 2,676 households (71%)
  - Renting: 1,093 households (29%)
  - Avg. household size: 2.4 persons

Concordia is a neighborhood in the Northeast section of Portland, Oregon, United States, named after the former Concordia University (now University of Oregon’s Portland campus), which is located within it. The neighborhood borders are NE 22nd Ave. on the west, NE Columbia Blvd. on the north, and NE 42nd Ave. on the east. On the south, the border is NE Prescott St. and NE Alberta Ct., to the west and east of NE 33rd Ave., respectively. Neighborhoods bordering Concordia are Woodlawn, Vernon, and Sabin on the west, Sunderland on the north, Cully on the east, and Alameda and Beaumont-Wilshire on the south.

Most of the Alberta Street Arts District is in Concordia.

Concordia University, a private liberal arts institution associated with the Lutheran Concordia University System, had been located in the central portion of the neighborhood since 1905 but ceased operations in 2020.

Neighborhood parks include Kennedy Community Garden and Fernhill Park. Notable landmarks include the Kennedy School, a former elementary school converted into a dining and hotel facility, and the Concordia University & Community Athletic Complex which opened in 2011.

== Demographics ==
In 2020, 10,238 people lived in Concordia, up 7% from 9,553 in 2010. 72% of people identified as white, 12.0% as Black or African American, 5.9% as Asian, 3.1% as American Indian or Alaska Native, 0.6% as Native Hawaiian or Pacific Islander, and 6.5% as some other race. 8.3% identified as Hispanic or Latino (any race). The median age in Concordia was 39.0. The median household income was listed at $106,000 and 22% of the neighborhood was covered by tree canopy. 78% of eligible residents voted in the 2020 general election.
