= City commission government =

Form of local government in the U.S.

City commission government is a form of local government in the United States. In a city commission government, voters elect a small commission, typically of five to seven members. It is most similar to the directorial system of national government.

These commissioners jointly constitute the legislative body of the city and, as a group, are responsible for taxation, appropriations, ordinances, and other general functions. Individual commissioners are also assigned executive responsibility for a specific aspect of municipal affairs, such as public works, finance, or public safety. This form of government thus blends legislative and executive branch functions in the same body. One commissioner may be designated to function as mayor, but this largely is an honorific or ceremonial designation. The mayor principally serves as chairman or president of the commission, presiding over meetings, but typically does not have additional powers over and above the other commissioners. In many cases, the mayor is selected by the commissioners from among themselves, though some cities with a commission form of government, such as Bismarck, North Dakota, have a specifically elected mayor.

As a form, commission government once was common, but has largely been supplanted as many cities that once used it have since switched to the council–manager form, in which the elected council, presided over by a non-executive mayor, hires a professional manager to oversee day-to-day operations of the city. Proponents of the council-manager form typically consider the city commission form to be the predecessor of, not the alternative to, the council-manager form of government. The commission form is now found in fewer than one percent of American municipalities.

== History ==
This form of government originated in Galveston, Texas, as a response to the Galveston Hurricane of 1900, mainly for the reason that extra support was needed in certain areas. After its constitutionality was tested and confirmed, this form of government quickly became popular across the state of Texas and spread to other parts of the United States. Des Moines, Iowa, became the first city outside Texas to adopt this form of government.

University of Chicago Professor Charles Zueblin was a major advocate of the commission plan of government, believing that every city in the United States would eventually adopt it. Zueblin also predicted that the system would eventually replace the United States Senate and House of Representatives. He believed the commission system would allow better lawmakers to be selected and that they would be subject to higher scrutiny.

However, the council-manager form, which developed at least in part as a response to some perceived limitations of the commission form, became the preferred alternative for progressive reform. After World War I, very few cities adopted the commission form and many cities using the commission plan switched to the council-manager form. Galveston itself changed forms in 1960.

Of the 30 most populous cities in the United States, Portland, Oregon was the only city with a commission government. A ballot measure passed in 2022 to replace it with a mayor-council government passed with 57% of the vote and Portland City Council was established.

== See also ==
- Directorial system - a system of government where there is a directly elected executive board
