= Gladstone Street Pizza =

Pizzeria in Portland, Oregon, U.S.

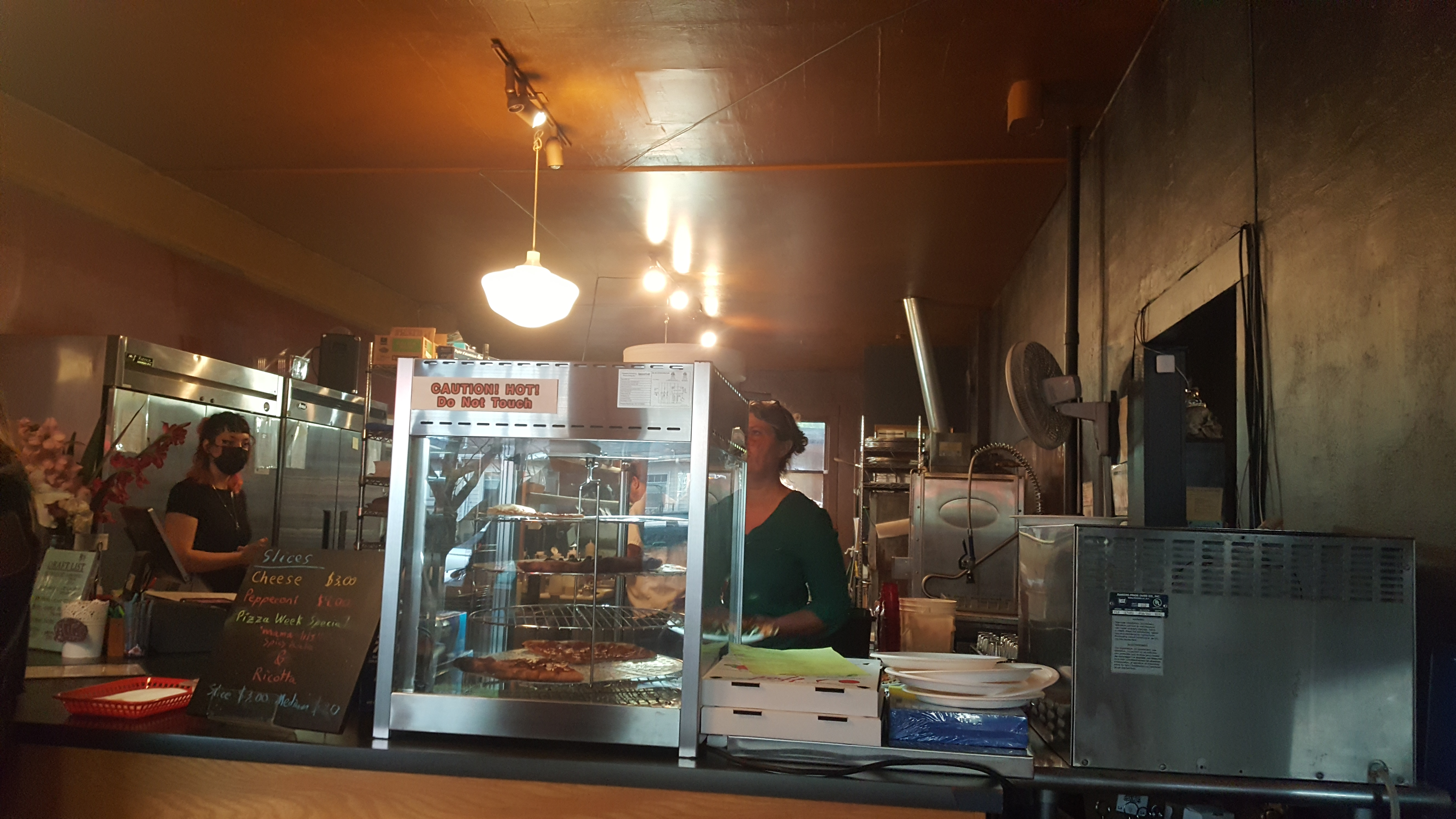
- The pizzeria's interior, 2022
- Interactive map of Gladstone Street Pizza

Restaurant information
- Owner: John Mitchell
- Food type: Italian (pizza)
- Location: 3813 Southeast Gladstone Street, Portland, Multnomah, Oregon, 97202, United States
- Coordinates: 45.4934°N 122.6234°W

Saint Pizza Lounge and Gladstone Street Pizza, more commonly known as simply Gladstone Street Pizza (GSP), was a pizzeria in Portland, Oregon, United States.

== Description ==
Gladstone Street Pizza (GSP) was a pizzeria in southeast Portland's Creston-Kenilworth neighborhood. In 2019, Willamette Week said, "Gladstone Street Pizza's temperament is split evenly between the Buckman neighborhood's bespoke parlors and a cut-rate pepperoni mill. The pizzeria crafts simply topped, thin-crusted paragons such as Italian sausage, sweet onion and arugula-topped Tri-Colour, and the house special covered in chevre, basil and Mama Lil's peppers." The 'For the House' pizza had Italian sausage, mozzarella, arugula, and pecorino Romano cheese.

The newspaper's Kelly Clarke wrote in 2011, "Serving big, cheesy, garlicky pies without an ounce of pretension, this bare-bones pizza chamber only proofs enough dough for 30 pizzas a night. They don't always run out, but it's not worth arriving late and missing out on the chance of wrapping your lips around a chewy-crusted slice topped with peppery arugula, sweet onions and sausage or groaning with Canadian bacon and pepperoni." The menu also included local microbrews and a Caesar salad.

== History ==
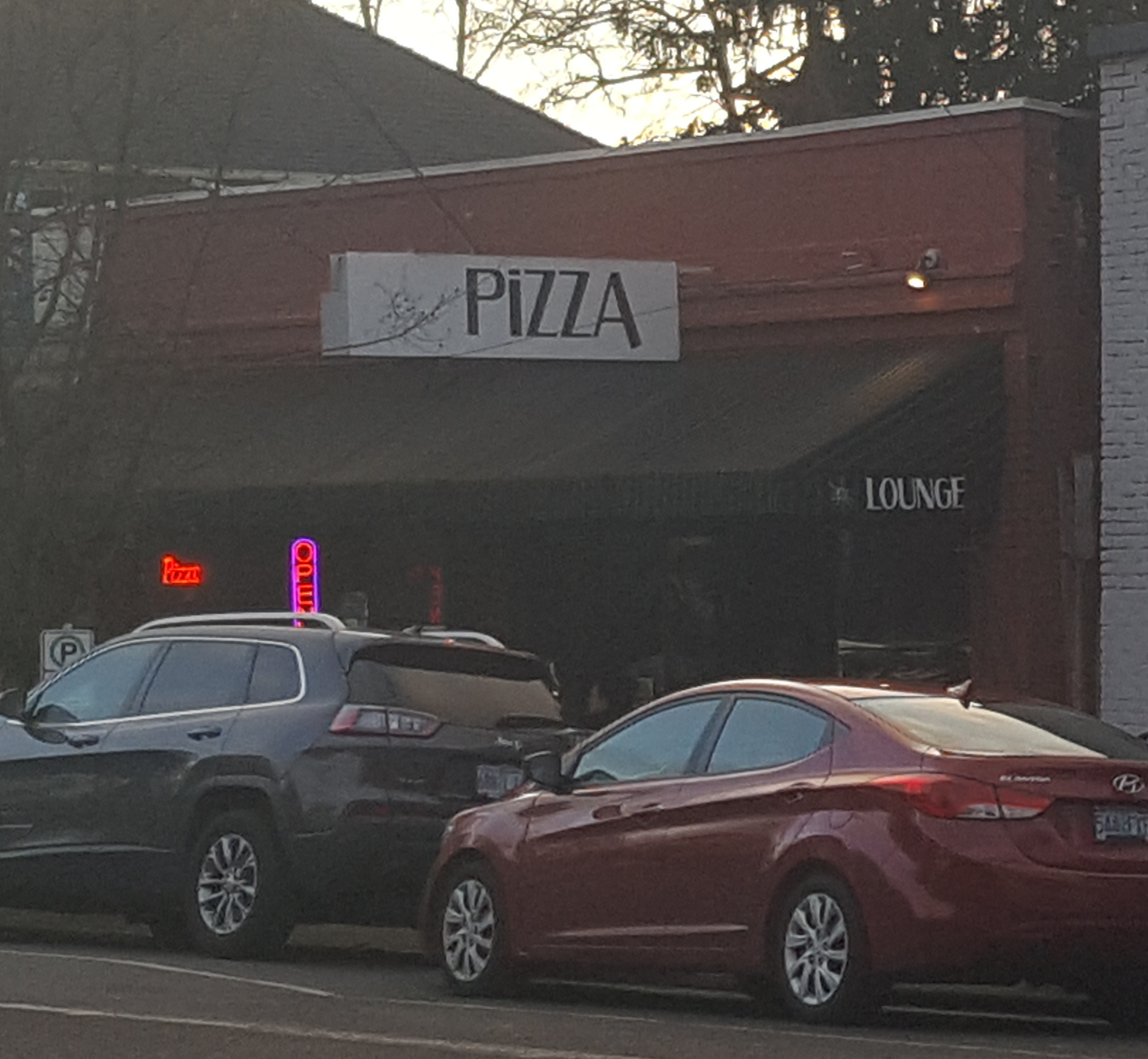
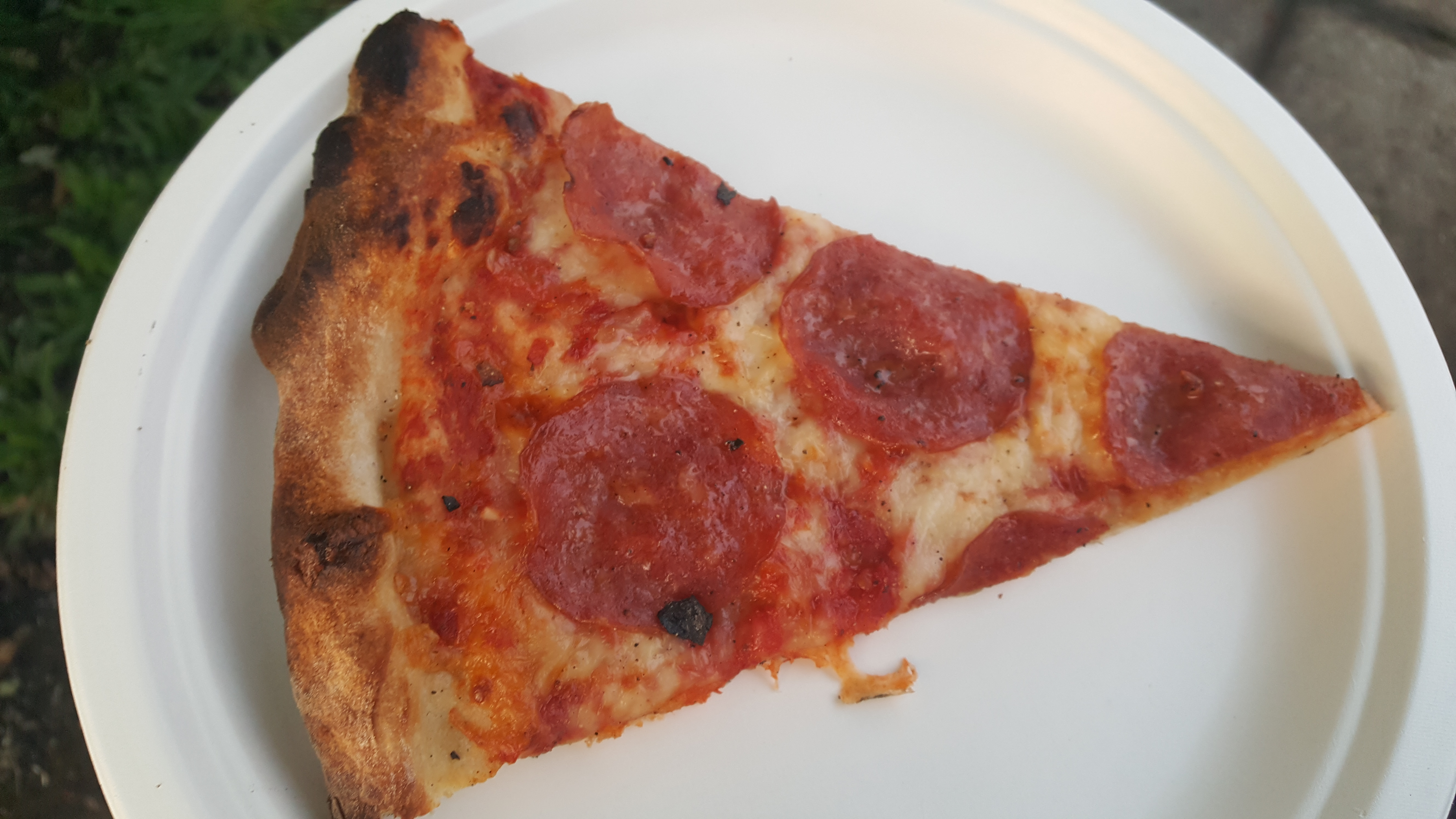
The pizzeria's exterior (top) and a slice of pepperoni pizza (bottom), 2022

John Mitchell was a co-owner and pizzaiolo; he wanted to open a pizzeria with New Haven-style pizza. Previously, he operated Gladstone Coffee and Gallery at the same address.

In 2011, Steve Beaven of The Oregonian credited GSP (and the Saint Pizza Lounge) and Gladstone Street Pub for "[creating] momentum on a formerly somnolent stretch of an often-overlooked street south of Southeast Powell Boulevard".

For Pizza Week in 2014, Mitchell collaborated with John Fimmano, co-owner and chef of nearby Shut Up and Eat, to re-create the latter's roast-pork sandwich in pizza form.

== Reception ==
In his 2012 overview of "pizzas worth your dough", Michael Russell of The Oregonian wrote:

Gladstone Street Pizza serves a delicious pie -- you could call it a tweaked East Coast style -- and the local spirits at their adjacent Saint Cocktail Lounge should put the bars at many so-called 'local' restaurants to shame... With a beer and cocktail list heavy with local spirits, a little Nina Simone in the air and a family-run atmosphere, this is the kind of pizzeria all neighborhoods deserve.

Russell also said Saint Pizza Lounge had a "top-notch" cocktail program with an "enviable list of local spirits" in the newspaper's 2012 overview of "the best spots to drink in Portland's cocktail scene". In 2016, readers of The Oregonian named GSP "People's Choice for Portland's best pizza place".

Editors of Slice selected GSP to represent Portland, along with Apizza Scholls, Ken's Artisan Pizza, and Lovely's Fifty-Fifty, in a 2012 list of the eight best pizzas in the Pacific Northwest. The pizzerias were chosen "despite not having regional styles steeped in history". Erin DeJesus included GSP in Eater Portland's 2012 list of "The (Sweet) 16 Essential Pizzerias of Portland". Nathan Williams included the business in a 2023 overview of recommended eateries in the neighborhood.

== See also ==
- List of defunct restaurants of the United States
- Pizza in Portland, Oregon
