= American Dream Pizza =

Defunct pizzeria in Portland, Oregon, U.S.

- Interactive map of American Dream Pizza

Restaurant information
- Established: 1985
- Closed: 2024
- Owners: Sebastian Malinow; Scott McFarland
- Location: 4620 Northeast Glisan Street, Portland, Multnomah, Oregon, 97213, United States
- Coordinates: 45.5262°N 122.6152°W
- Website: americandreampizzapdx.com

American Dream Pizza was a pizzeria in Portland, Oregon, United States. Sebastian Malinow and Scott McFarland opened the restaurant in northeast Portland in 1985. A spin-off of the same name opened in Corvallis in 1989, and later became separately owned. Another spin-off, Satellite Dream Pizza, opened in the Westmoreland district of southeast Portland's Sellwood-Moreland neighborhood. The original restaurant closed in 2024.

Under new ownership, a "revival" of American Dream called The Original Dream opened in the same northeast Portland location in June 2025.

== Description ==
American Dream Pizza operated in northeast Portland part of the North Tabor neighborhood. The pizzeria was known for its "funky" decor and pizza box art contests. Pizzas were customizable and ingredients included chipotle and roasted hazelnuts. The edges of pizzas were braided, based on one of the owners' familiarity with braiding empanadas.

== History ==
American Dream opened in 1985. Sebastian Malinow and Scott McFarland were co-founders. Eater Portland said the business was "one of Portland’s oldest dedicated pizza restaurants". The website said American Dream claims to be "one of the first in Portland to make hand-rolled crust and serve Widmer beer".

A Corvallis restaurant of the same name was spun out from the Portland restaurant in 1989. The restaurant caters to students, faculty, and staff at Oregon State University and has been described as "a Corvallis institution". U.S. President Barack Obama ate at the Corvallis location, which has rooftop seating and an affiliated Crow Bar.

In August 2014, American Dream announced plans to open a second Portland location in southeast Portland. The spin-off opened as Satellite Dream Pizza in the Westmoreland district of the Sellwood-Moreland neighborhood.

=== Closure and revival ===
The Portland restaurant closed in July 2024, after operating for approximately 40 years.

In June 2025, a new pizzeria called The Original Dream opened in the same Portland space that had housed American Dream. The Oregonian had described the launch of The Original Dream as a "revival" of American Dream, started by "fans" of the former business who wanted to replicate the restaurant's pizza and atmosphere. Amy and Daniel Northrop, along with Chris Pfeiffer, kept American Dream's recipes and braided crust but were required to operate under a different name because of the separately owned Corvallis restaurant. In 2026, Original Dream was sold. Atlas Pizza announced plans to open a fourth location in the space.

== Reception ==
In Willamette Week's 2024 overview of five "Old Portland pizza parlors that feed the stomach and the soul", Bennett Campbell Ferguson recommend the calzones and wrote, "Judged by dough alone, American Dream is legendary. The braided, garlicky crust is perfect for slices, pies and calzones—and thick enough to support the famously heavy layers of sauce and cheese. The scrumptiousness of the pizza is matched only by the gloriously gaudy décor: walls of pizza boxes covered in customers’ colorful illustrations."

== See also ==
- List of defunct restaurants of the United States
- Pizza in Portland, Oregon
