= Red Sauce Pizza =

Pizzeria in Portland, Oregon, U.S.

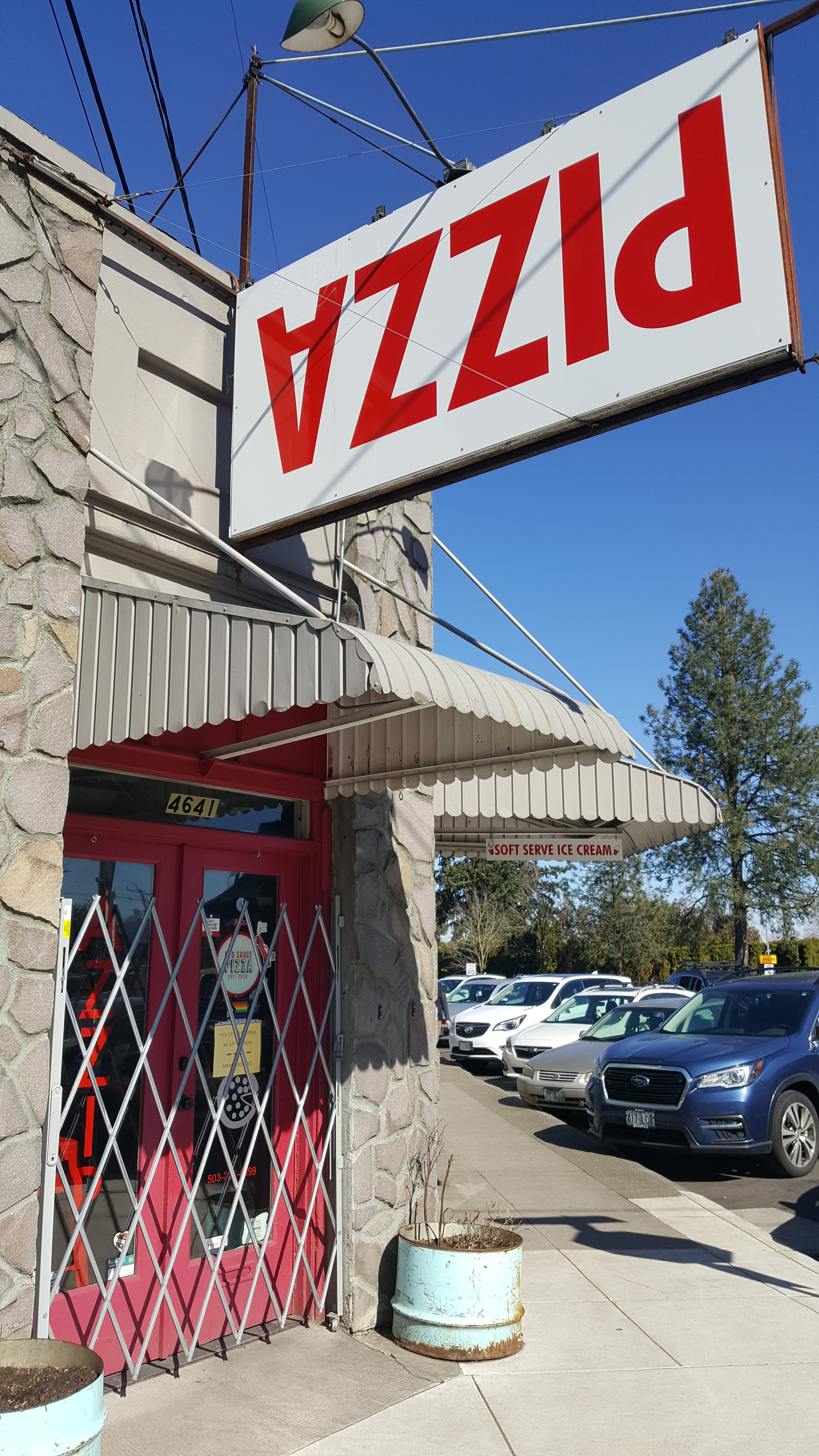
- The restaurant's front entrance, 2022
- Interactive map of Red Sauce Pizza

Restaurant information
- Established: October 23, 2015
- Owner: Shardell Dues
- Food type: Pizza
- Location: 4641 Northeast Fremont Street, Portland, Multnomah, Oregon, 97213, United States
- Coordinates: 45.5484°N 122.6152°W
- Website: redsaucepizza.com

Red Sauce Pizza is a pizzeria in Portland, Oregon, United States.

== Description ==
Red Sauce Pizza is a pizzeria in Portland. In addition to pizzas, the menu includes calzones and salads. The LGBTQ-owned business has sign with the text 'PIZZA' written upside down, which was used by another pizzeria which had occupied the space previously.

== History ==
Owner Shardell Dues opened Red Sauce Pizza in northeast Portland's Concordia neighborhood on October 23, 2015, in a space which previously housed Bob's Rocket Pizza. Dues had previously managed Apizza Scholls. In 2019, Red Sauce relocated to northeast Portland's Beaumont-Wilshire neighborhood.

== Reception ==
In 2021, Waz Wu and Brooke Jackson-Glidden included Red Sauce Pizza in Eater Portland's 2021 lists of "Where to Find Knockout Vegan Pizza in Portland" and "Where to Find Exceptional Pizzas in Portland", respectively.

== See also ==
- Pizza in Portland, Oregon
