= Pizza in Portland, Oregon =

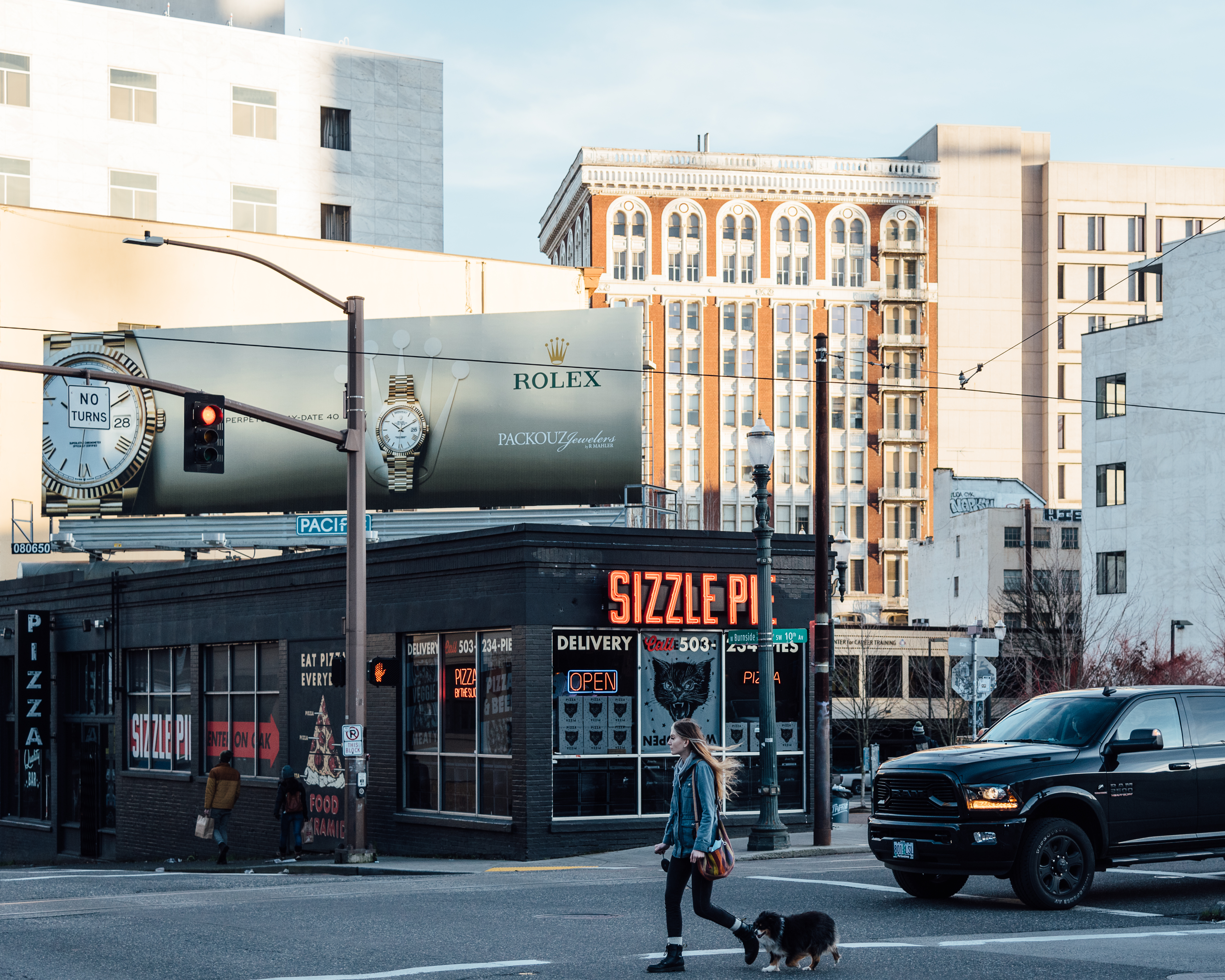
Sizzle Pie on West Burnside Street, 2016

The American city of Portland, Oregon has been recognized for its pizza culture and establishments. In Time Out's 2024 list of the world's best twenty cities for food, Portland ranked tenth and pizza was considered the city's "must-eat" dish.

== Culture ==
The Portland Mercury hosts Pizza Week annually. In 2015, Pete Cottell of Willamette Week wrote, "With no local pizza style of its own to speak of, Portland pie spots assume the preferences of owners who have emigrated from regions with specific takes on this divisive dish."

In 2021, Eater Portland's Alex Frane said Portland underwent a pizzeria "boom" in 2020. He described Portland as "a city bursting with pizza shops new and old" that "seems to have no sign of slowing down", with an "ever-growing roster of new pizza shops". The website's Brooke Jackson-Glidden wrote, "Trying to define the city's specific style of pizza would be difficult, outside of thick, multi-grain crusts piled with seasonal vegetables — and still, some of the city's finest pizzerias don't make pies anywhere near that form." She said of comparisons between Portland and other cities: "if you moved here from Manhattan, or Chicago, or New Haven, you may have an overriding sense of nostalgia that keeps you from enjoying the pizza that's here. That's okay — these pizzerias will continue to churn out pies, regardless of who's paying attention." In 2026, Christopher Bjorke of the Portland Business Journal said Portland "is in the middle of something of a pizza renaissance".

== Recognition ==
Anthony Falco called Portland the "greatest pizza city" in the U.S. in 2018. In 2021, Modernist Pizza authors Nathan Myhrvold and Francisco Migoya named Portland the country's "best pizza city". Jackson-Glidden wrote in 2021, "Frankly, Portland does have a glut of exceptional pizzerias, with chefs who moved here after working in some of the country's most noteworthy pizzerias and restaurants." She cited Pizza Jerk's Tommy Habetz, who worked for Bobby Flay, and Nostrana's Cathy Whims, who studied under Marcella Hazan, as examples. Jackson-Glidden also noted the accomplishments of Ken Forkish (Ken's Artisan Pizza), who wrote James Beard Foundation Award winning books about making bread and pizza.

== Pizzerias ==
=== Current ===
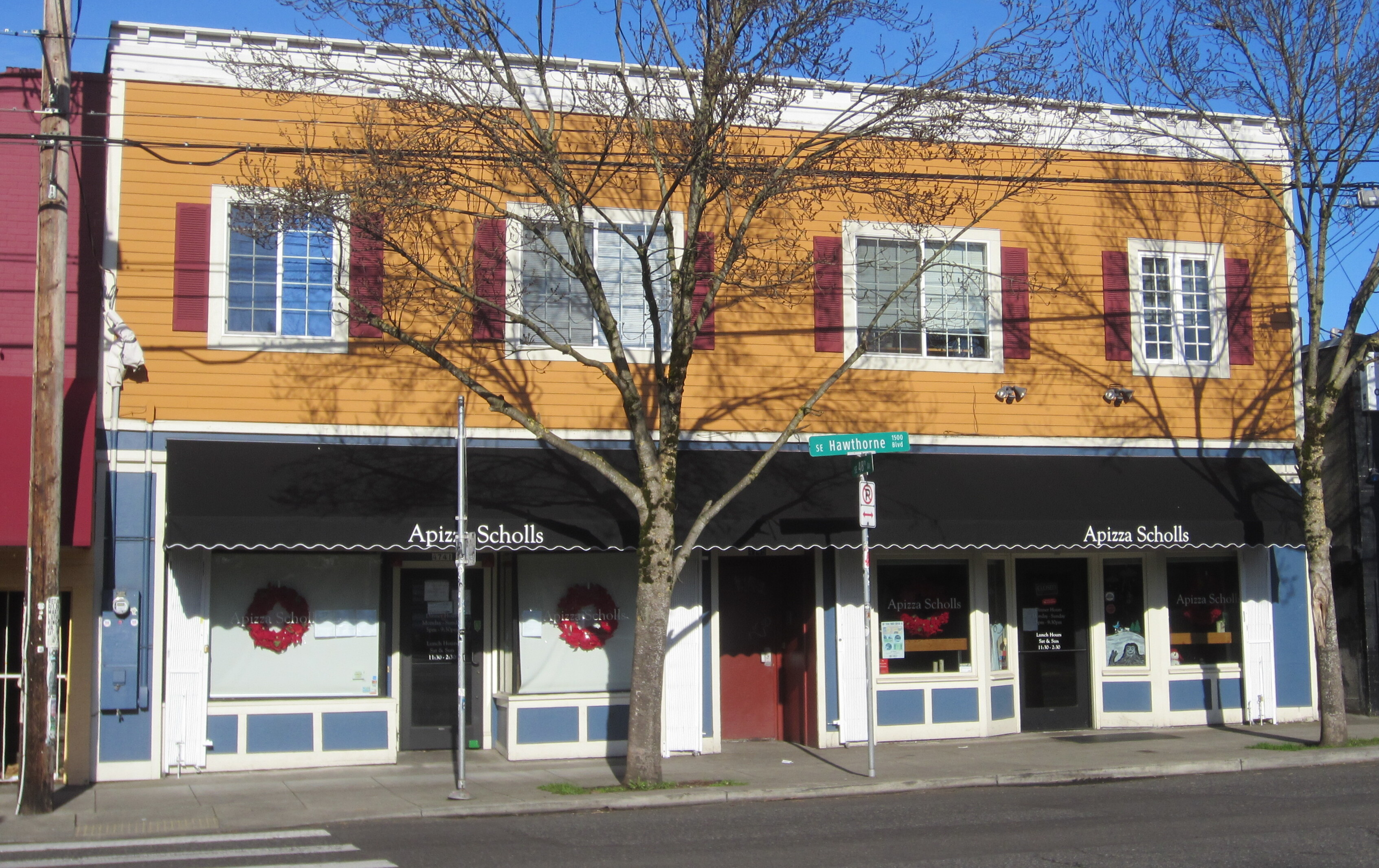
Apizza Scholls, 2021

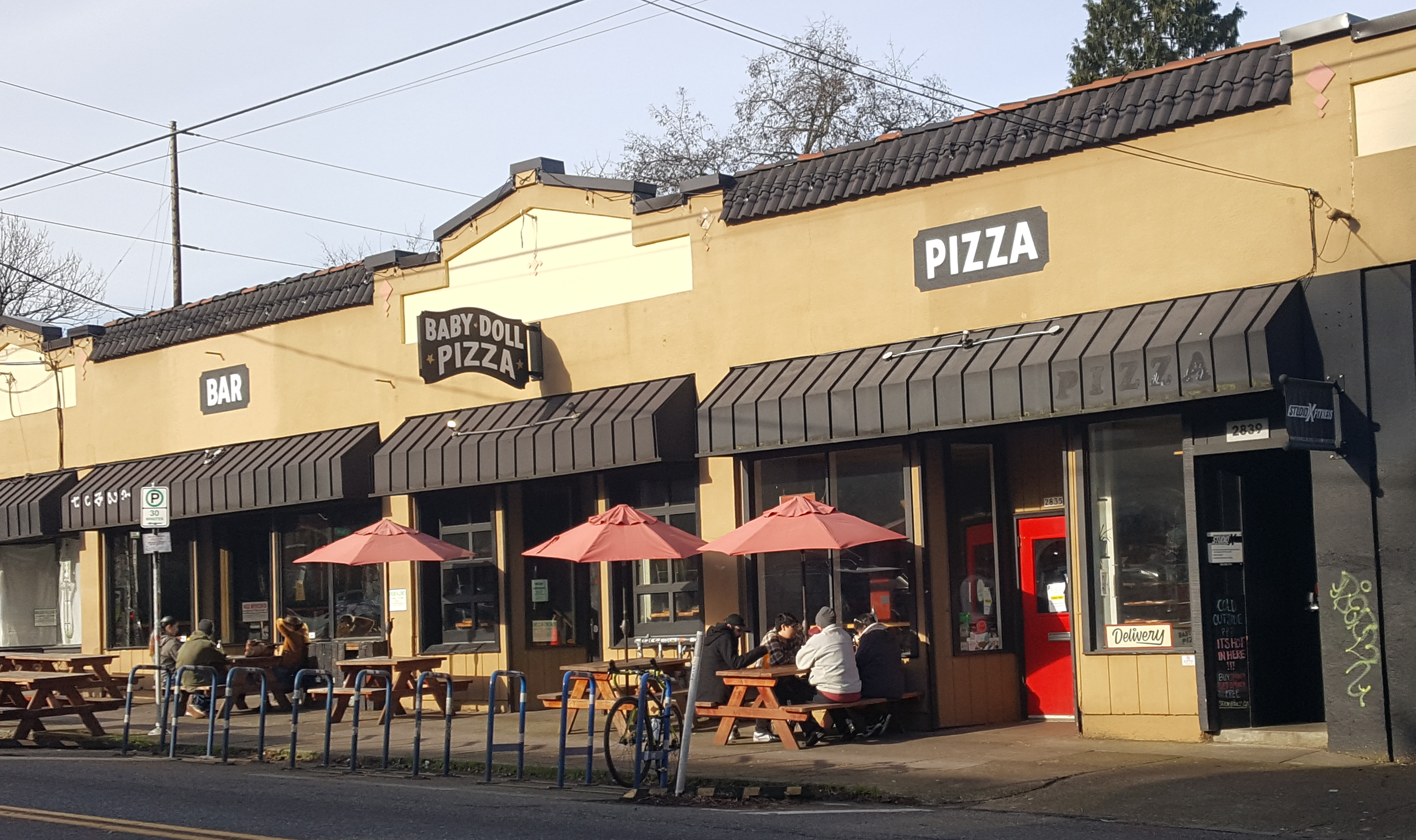
Baby Doll Pizza

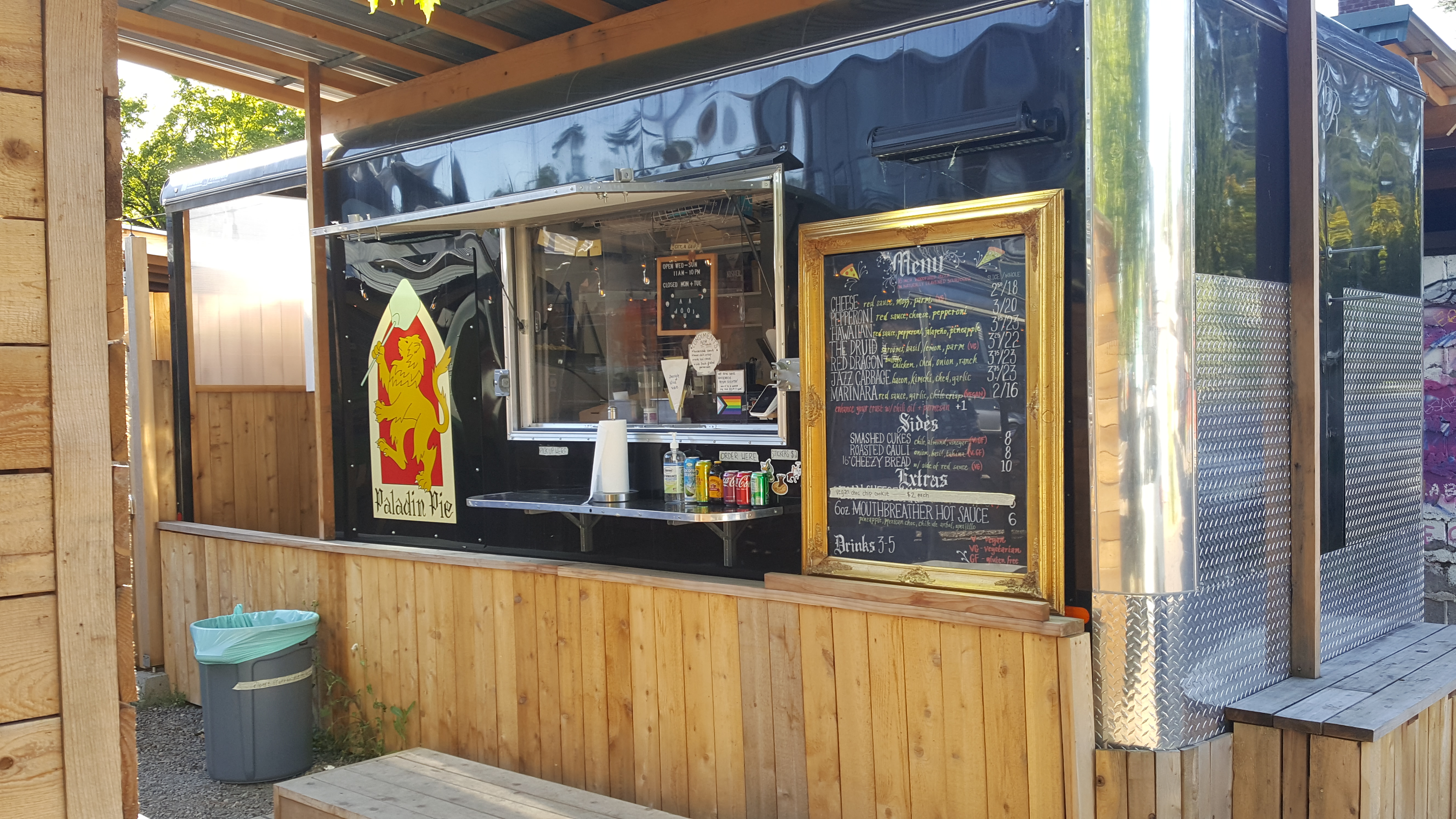
Paladin Pie

Notable pizzerias currently operating in Portland include:

- Apizza Scholls (2005)
- Atlas Pizza (2014)
- Baby Doll Pizza
- Boxcar Pizza
- Caro Amico (1949)
- Dimo's Apizza (2020)
- Dove Vivi
- East Glisan Pizza Lounge (2014)
- Escape from New York Pizza (1983)
- Grana Pizza Napoletana
- Ken's Artisan Pizza (2006)
- Lovely's Fifty Fifty
- No Saint
- Nostrana (2005)
- Old Town Pizza (1974)
- Oven and Shaker
- Paladin Pie (2020)
- Pan Con Queso
- Pizza Jerk (2015)
- Pizza Thief (2021)
- Pizzeria Otto
- Ranch Pizza
- Red Sauce Pizza (2015)
- Scottie's Pizza Parlor (2015)
- Silver Dollar Pizza
- Turning Peel

The chains Hot Lips Pizza and Sizzle Pie are also based in the city.

=== Defunct ===
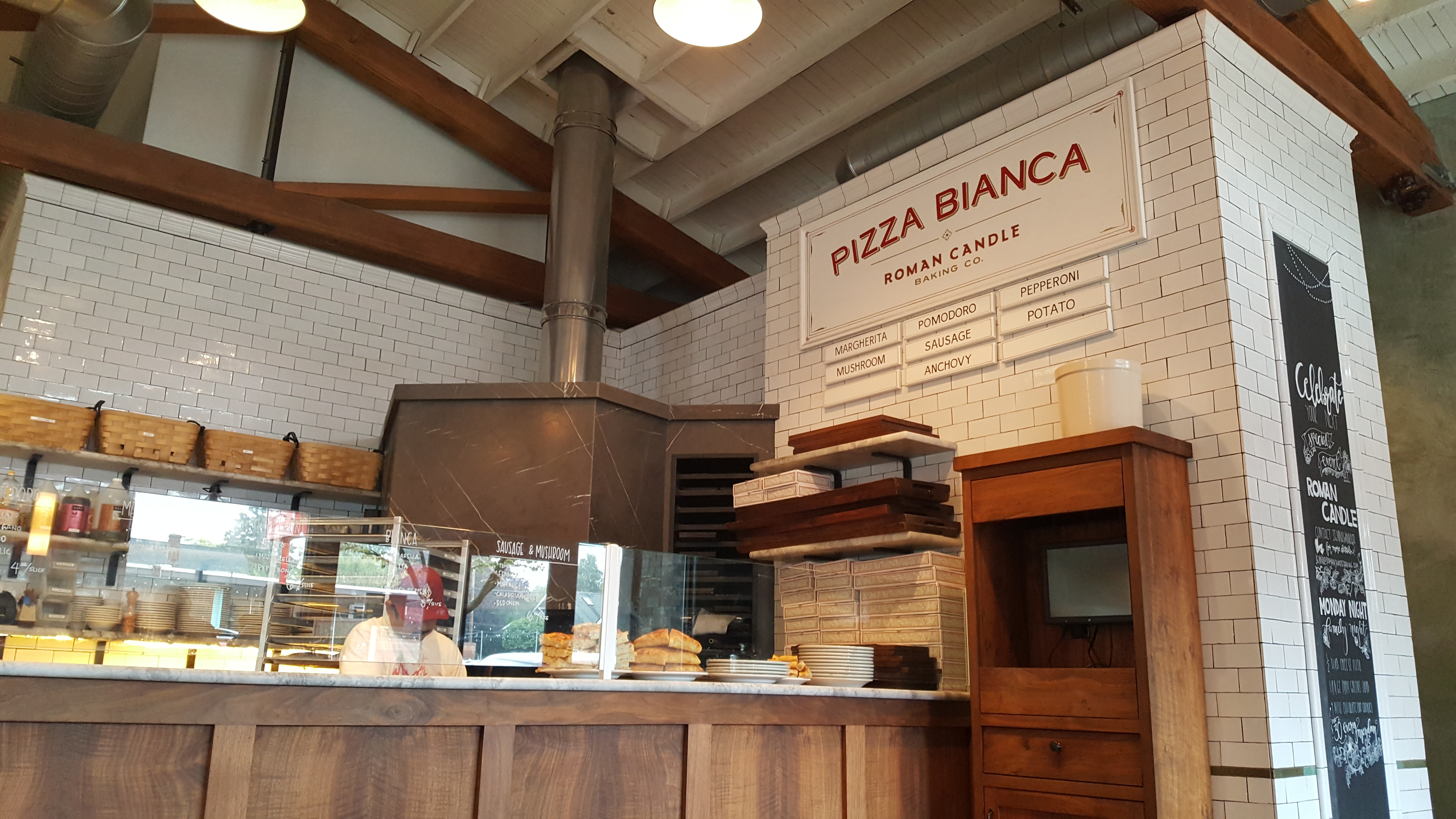
Interior of Roman Candle, 2016

Notable defunct pizzerias include:

- American Dream Pizza (1985–2024)
- Assembly Brewing (2019–2025)
- Baby Blue Pizza (2019–2022)
- Bridge City Pizza
- Gladstone Street Pizza
- Gracie's Apizza
- Handsome Pizza (2012–2022)
- Lonesome's Pizza (2010–2017)
- Organ Grinder Restaurant (1973–1996)
- Reeva (2022–2025)
- Roman Candle (2013–2018)

The chain Via Tribunali operated in Portland from 2011 to 2015.

== See also ==
- Culture of Portland, Oregon
