= Caro Amico =

Italian restaurant in Portland, Oregon, U.S.

- Interactive map of Caro Amico

Restaurant information
- Established: 1949
- Food type: Italian
- Location: 3606 Southwest Barbur Boulevard, Portland, Multnomah, Oregon, 97239, United States
- Coordinates: 45.4972°N 122.6786°W
- Website: caroamicoitaliancafe.com

Caro Amico is an Italian restaurant in Portland, Oregon, United States. It opened in 1949.

== Description ==
The Italian restaurant Caro Amico operates in a three-story Victorian house on Barbur Boulevard. It has a back patio with views of the Willamette River. In addition to pizza, the restaurant's menu has included bruschetta pomodoro, chicken piccata, and veal Parmesan.

== History ==
Caro Amico opened in 1949 and began selling pizza in 1953. It has been described as the oldest Italian restaurant in Oregon, and one of the first pizzerias in Portland. The restaurant has suffered two large fires, one during the 1960s and another in 2020, during the COVID-19 pandemic.

== See also ==
- List of Italian restaurants
- Pizza in Portland, Oregon
