= Pizzeria Otto =

Pizzeria in Portland, Oregon, U.S.

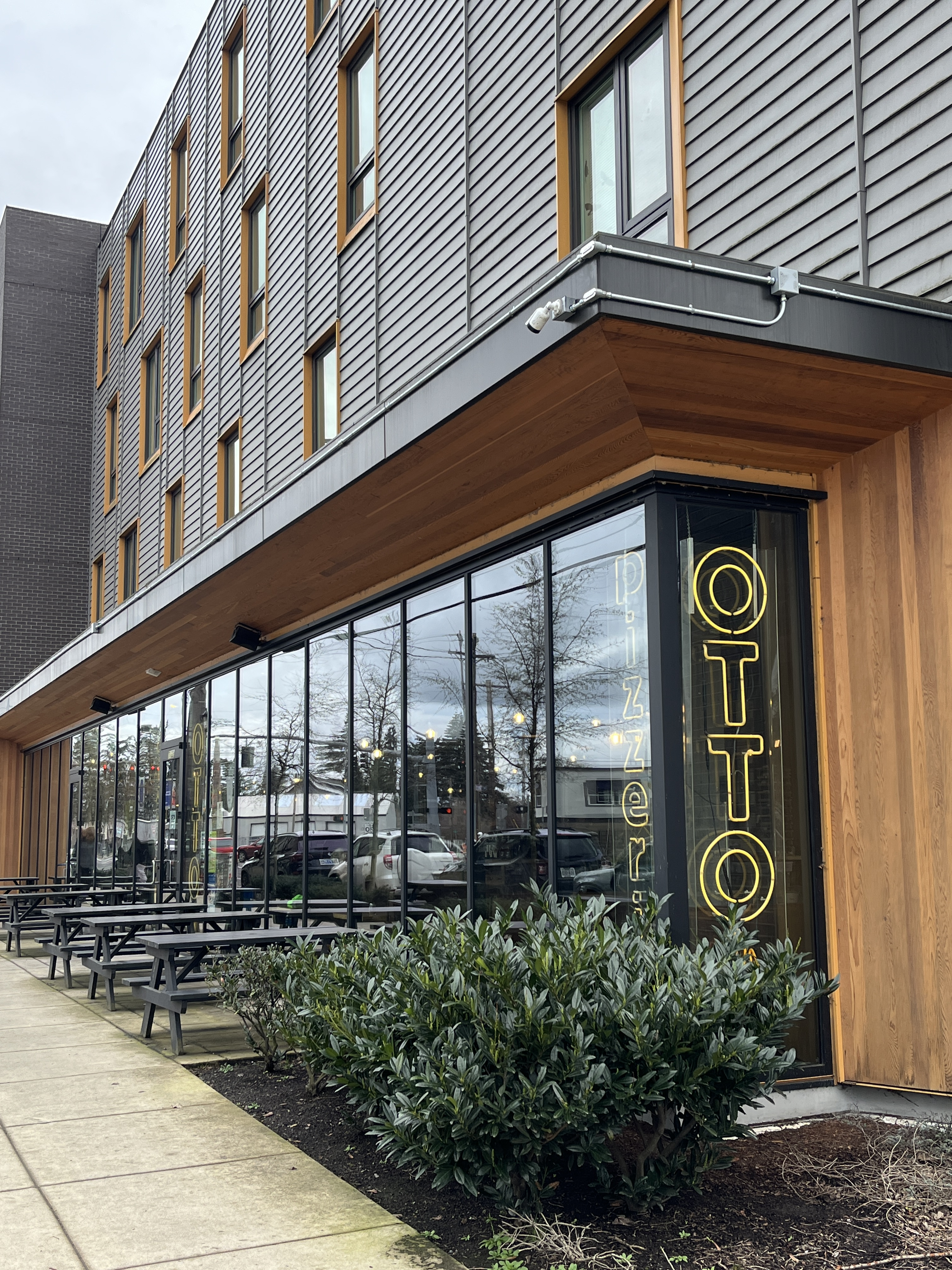
- Exterior of the pizzeria in southeast Portland, 2025

Restaurant information
- Established: 2014
- Owner: Clark Hale
- Food type: Italian (pizza)
- Location: Portland, Oregon, United States
- Website: pizzeriaotto.com

Pizzeria Otto is a pizzeria with two locations in Portland, Oregon, United States. The original restaurant opened in northeast Portland in 2014, and a second has operated in southeast Portland since 2019.

== History ==
Owner Clark Hale and pizzaiolo Justin Clarke opened Pizzeria Otto in northeast Portland's Roseway neighborhood in 2014, serving Neapolitan pizza within the 36-seat restaurant. In addition to pizza, the menu includes Caesar, mixed, and spinach salads. In 2015, Jamie Hale of The Oregonian wrote, "The place was bustling on a Monday evening, but the typical 20-somethings you'd expect to find were replaced with neighborhood families, filling the tiny pizzeria to capacity."

In 2016, the restaurant's team went to Naples for research. Sam J. Reed began managing the pizza oven in 2016.

In 2019, Hale confirmed plans to open a second, larger location in southeast Portland's Mt. Scott-Arleta neighborhood, near Foster-Powell. Sometimes referred to as Pizzeria Otto FoPo, the approximately 2,300 square-foot new space seats 80 people.

== Reception ==
In 2021, Portland Monthly's Benjamin Tepler said Pizzeria Otto offered the "best and only" Neapolitan pizza in the Foster-Powell neighborhood. Brooke Jackson-Glidden included Pizzeria Otto in Eater Portland's 2021 list, "15 Date-Worthy Restaurants in Portland Actually Open on Mondays". She also included the pizzeria in a 2022 overview of "Where to Find Exceptional Pizzas in Portland", writing, "The Neapolitan-style pizzas at Pizzeria Otto are outstanding, cooked in a rustic wood-fired oven in high heat, but the toppings are decidedly Pacific Northwestern." The business was named the Portland metropolitan area's fifth best pizza restaurant in The Oregonian's Readers Choice Awards in 2026.

== See also ==
- Pizza in Portland, Oregon
