= Baby Doll Pizza =

Pizzeria in Portland, Oregon, U.S.

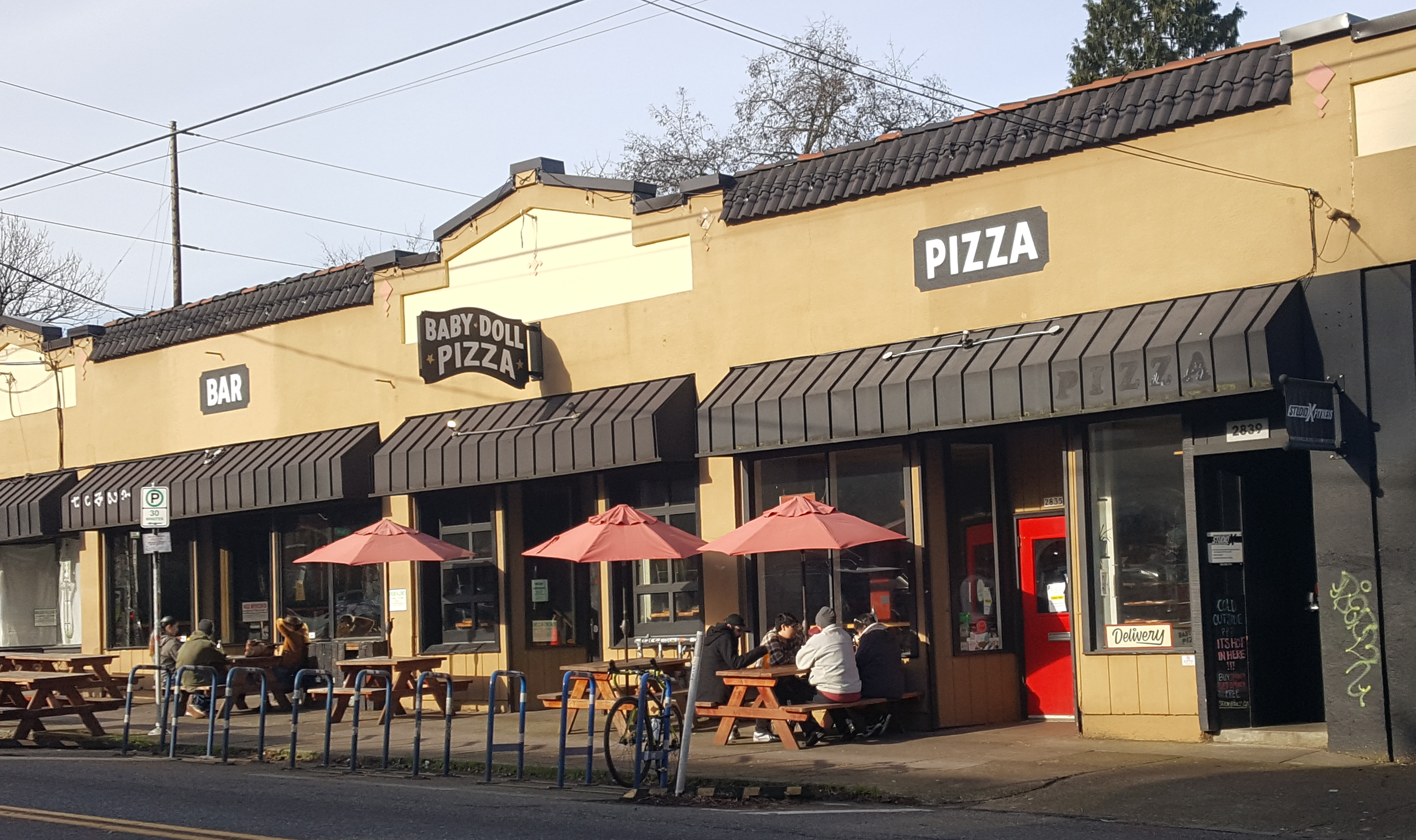
- Exterior of the original restaurant in the southeast Portland part of the Kerns neighborhood, 2022
- Interactive map of Baby Doll Pizza

Restaurant information
- Owner: Adam Milne (2021–present)
- Previous owner: Travis Miranda
- Food type: Pizza
- Location: 2835 Southeast Stark Street, Portland, Multnomah, Oregon, 97214, United States
- Coordinates: 45.5194°N 122.6365°W
- Website: babydollpizza.com

Baby Doll Pizza is a pizzeria with two locations in Portland, Oregon, United States. The original restaurant opened in the southeast Portland part of the Kerns neighborhood in 2011 or 2012, and a second operates in northeast Portland's King neighborhood.

== Description ==
Baby Doll Pizza, named after a topless bar in Manhattan, is a New York–style pizzeria with two locations in Portland, Oregon. The original restaurant operates on Stark Street in the southeast Portland portion of the Kerns neighborhood. In 2018, Nick Woo of Eater Portland wrote, "In this laid-back, casual spot with pinball machines and checkerboard flooring, pizza is available by the slice or as a whole pie. The thin crust has a crispy bottom, and toppings are made in-house including the sauce, sausage, ricotta, and mozzarella. Adjoining a full bar, the draft list runs about 12 deep with about 30 bottle choices. It’s also open late to satisfy any 2 a.m. pizza cravings." In 2021, the website's Rachel Pinsky said, "Enthusiastic twenty-somethings in overalls and tie dye serve pepperoni pies, sandwiches, and squares from this popular pizza spot frequented by Central Catholic students and SE Stark neighbors", and Nathan Williams wrote, "This is comfort food pizza intended to accompany the deep tap list of Baby Doll’s adjoining bar. Chessboard floor tile, pinball machines, black leather booths, and low-hung lighting gives the dining room David Lynch meets Tim Burton vibes."

A second location operates at Old Town Brewing at the intersection of Martin Luther King Jr. Boulevard and Sumner Street in northeast Portland's King neighborhood.

== History ==
The pizzeria was founded by Travis Miranda in 2011 or 2012. The original Baby Doll restaurant operates in the space previously occupied by Stark Naked Pizza. Adam Milne purchased the business in 2021.

Baby Doll has offered special pies for the annual Pizza Week. In 2016, The Gavone had basil, mozzarella, provolone, vodka sauce, breaded deep-fried chicken, and penne pasta. 2019's Over Acheeser had mozzarella, gouda provolone mushrooms, roasted red peppers, garlic, rosemary, and organic tomato sauce. In 2021, the pizzeria's Holy Mole included mozzarella and pepper jack, mole-marinated chicken, sautéed poblano pepper, white onion, avocado cilantro crema, and cotija cheese.

The restaurant offered in-house delivery, as of 2021. In 2023, Baby Doll and Old Town Brewing collaborated on a new beer called Old Baby.

The second Baby Doll location began operating in January 2025.

== Reception ==
In 2017, Willamette Week included Baby Doll in a list of the city's best bar pizzas. The restaurant was a runner-up and ranked second in the Best Pizza category of the newspaper's annual 'Best of Portland' readers' poll in 2022 and 2024, respectively. Michael Russell ranked Baby Doll number three in The Oregonian's 2018 list of Portland's best pizza by the slice. Considered a local favorite, the business had 4.5 out of 5 stars on Yelp, based on 364 reviews, as of February 2020.

== See also ==
- List of pizza chains of the United States
- Pizza in Portland, Oregon
