= East Glisan Pizza Lounge =

Pizzeria in Portland, Oregon, U.S.

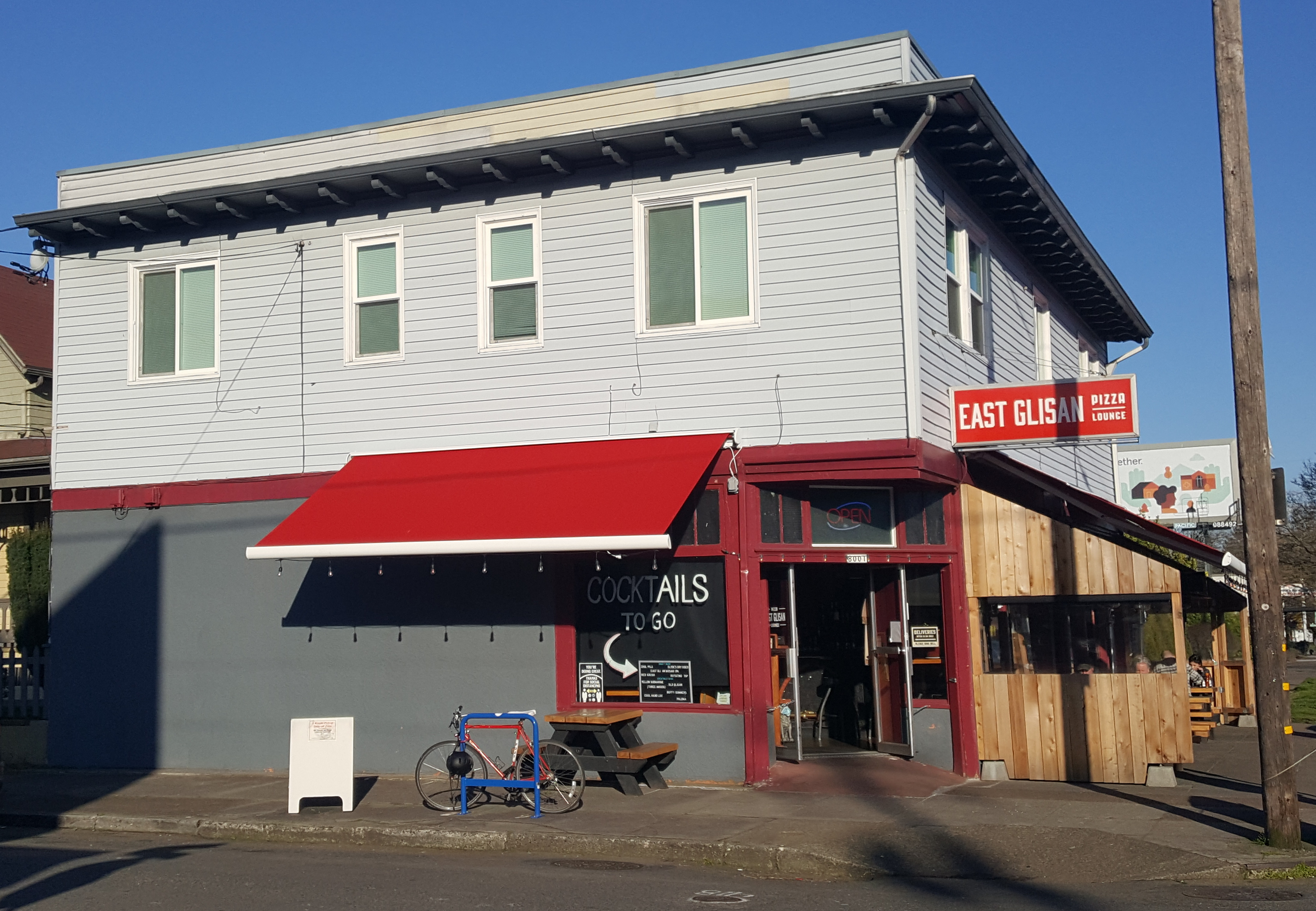
- The restaurant's exterior in 2022
- Interactive map of East Glisan Pizza Lounge

Restaurant information
- Established: 2014
- Owners: Kristen Martha Brown; Todd Dennis
- Food type: Italian (pizza)
- Location: 8001 Northeast Glisan Street, Portland, Multnomah, Oregon, 97213, United States
- Coordinates: 45.5266°N 122.5813°W
- Website: eastglisan.com

East Glisan Pizza Lounge is a pizzeria in Portland, Oregon, United States. Established in 2014, the restaurant operates in the northeast Portland part of the Montavilla neighborhood.

== Description ==
East Glisan Pizza Lounge is a pizzeria on Glisan Street in the northeast Portland part of the Montavilla neighborhood. Willamette Week's Martin Cizmar said of the interior and atmosphere: "The dimly lit East Glisan is indeed a lounge. Roughly half the seating is bar stools or couches, and the front sidewalk is home to a fleet of those rugged wooden picnic tables where smokers huddle outside Portland dive bars. It's all '90s classics on the radio: early Wilco and Liz Phair, midcareer Whitney Houston and Tina Turner."

As of 2014, the menu offered ten types of pizza, five appetizers, and three salads. One pizza has broccoli rapini and garlic oil and another has capicola with provolone, fennel, and Mama Lil's peppers. Appetizers include chickpea fritters and pork meatballs with tomato and Parmesan. Beer, cocktails, and wine are also available.

As of 2017, East Glisan offered Detroit-style pizza on Tuesdays.

== History ==
Chef Vallery Markel opened the restaurant in 2014, in a two-room space which previously housed a Mexican restaurant. Kristen Martha Brown and Todd Dennis are the owners.

For Pizza Week in 2014, Markel and Adam Sappington, the chef and owner of The Country Cat, collaborated to create the 'Country Cat Pizza'. The balsamic-braised bacon pizza, available for one week, had roasted butternut squash puree, goat cheese, and arugula. Detroit-style pizza was added to the menu in 2016.

The restaurant closed temporarily in March 2025. On social media, the owners said, "East Glisan is not the place we need it to be for us, or what we want it to be for employees". The announcement said a return was planned but they were "taking some space to look at the business with new eyes, to take what we've learned over the past 11 years and rebuild with structure and culture in place that we and our crew deserve". East Glisan re-opened on May 5.

== Reception ==
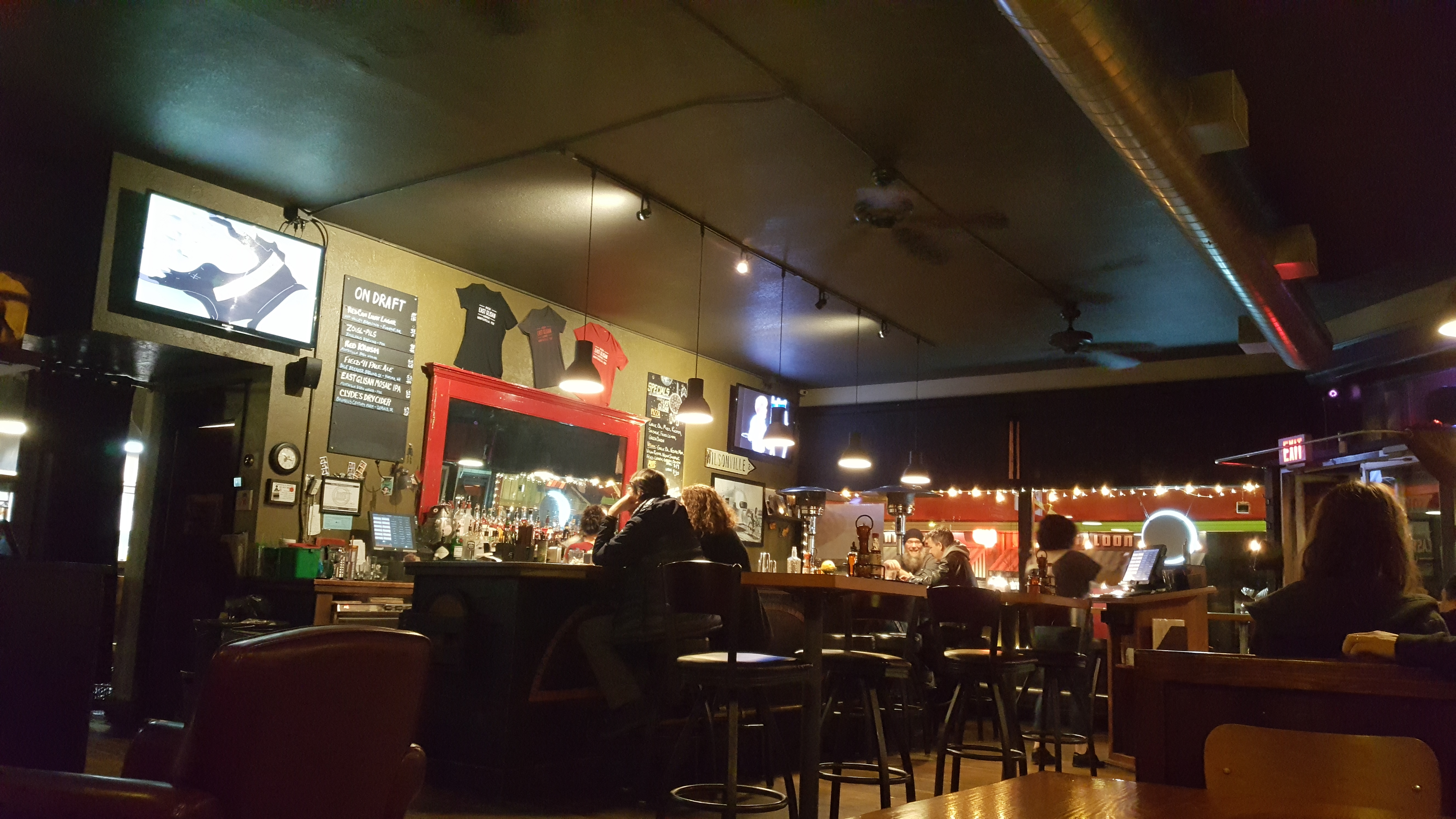
The pizzeria's interior, 2022

Andrea Damewood of the Portland Mercury said East Glisan's pizzas "are a solid addition to the area, and good enough for those of us who live west of César E. Chávez Blvd. to cheat on our own favorite spot at least a few times". Her review said, "Despite small flaws, East Glisan should definitely be on the list for both pizza completists and those looking to satisfy a carnal desire for melty cheese, meat, and bread." Martin Cizmar included East Glisan in Willamette Week's 2017 list of the city's six best restaurants for Detroit-style pizza. The newspaper also included East Glisan in a 2017 list of the city's best bar pizzas and said Brown had "one of the best little pizzerias around" with "the best Detroit pies in town". Michael Russell ranked East Glisan number ten on The Oregonian's 2018 list of Portland's top ten pizzerias. Alex Frane included East Glisan in Thrillist's 2020 overview of Portland's "absolute best" pizza.

== See also ==
- Pizza in Portland, Oregon
