= Hot Lips Pizza =

Pizza restaurant chain based in Portland, Oregon, U.S.

HOTLIPS Pizza

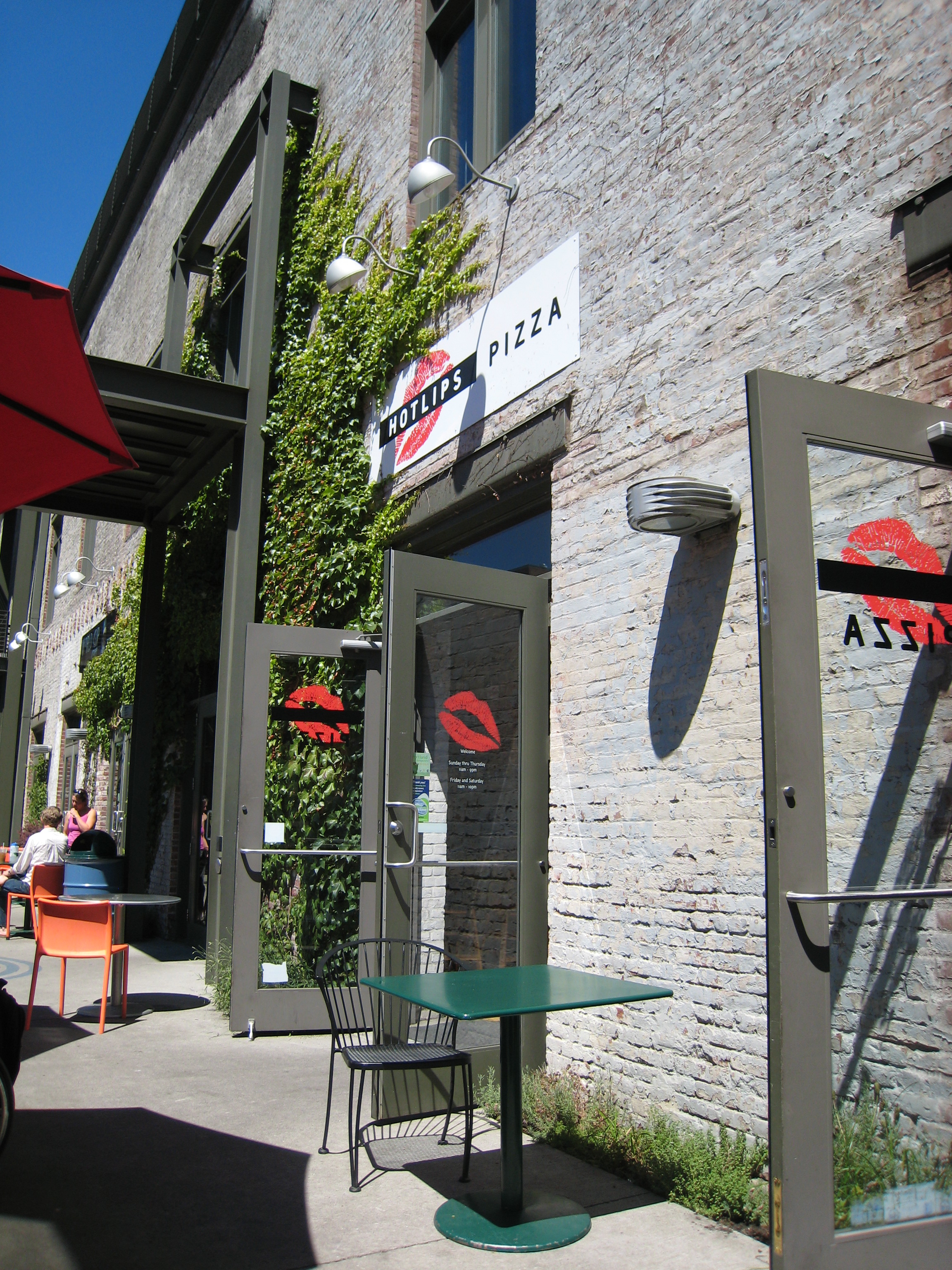
- Location in Portland, Oregon's Pearl District, 2008
- Industry: Restaurants
- Founded: 1984; 42 years ago
- Number of locations: 2
- Area served: Portland, Oregon
- Owner: David Yudkin and Jeanna Edelman
- Website: www.hotlipspizza.com

HOTLIPS Pizza is a chain of pizza restaurants in the Portland, Oregon, area. It is known for using local, organic ingredients in its pizzas.

== History ==
HOTLIPS Pizza was founded in 1984 by David Yudkin's father-in-law. Yudkin and his wife, Jeana Edelman, took over the business in 1994. In 2005, HOTLIPS started selling fruit sodas made from local fruits. The sodas were featured in The New York Times. In 2011, Hot Lips made its millionth bottle of soda.

== Environmental practices ==
Many of HOTLIPS' ingredients are bought from local farmers, especially from farmers' markets. It also makes all of its packaging compostable. Waste heat from the ovens at their Pearl District location is used to heat the whole restaurant.

== See also ==
- List of pizza chains of the United States
- Pizza in Portland, Oregon
