= Pizza Thief =

Pizzeria in Portland, Oregon, U.S.

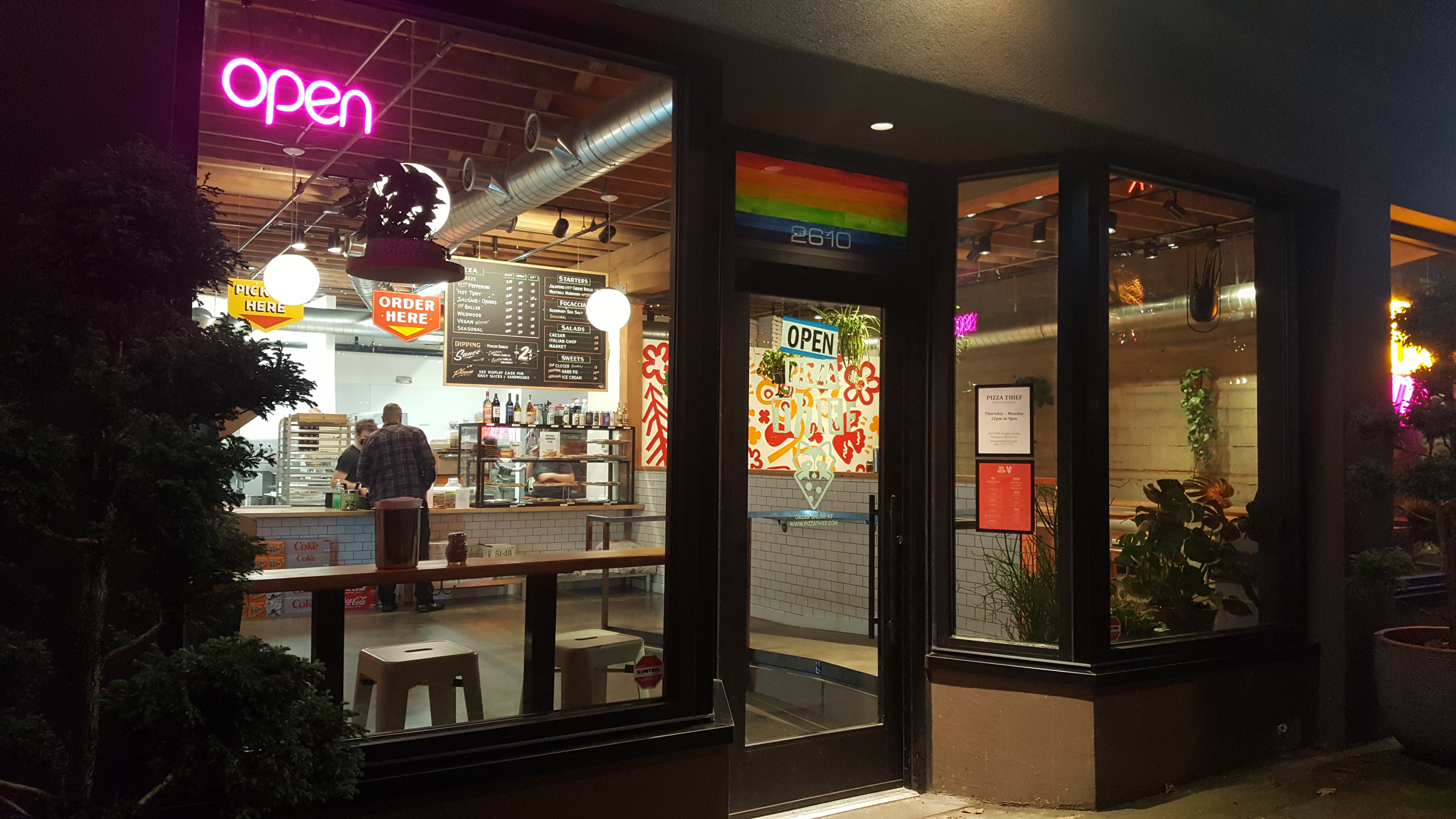
- The pizzeria's exterior in 2022
- Interactive map of Pizza Thief

Restaurant information
- Established: 2021
- Owners: Darby Aldaco; Tony Pasquale
- Chef: Darby Aldaco
- Food type: Pizza
- Location: 2610 Northwest Vaughn Street, Portland, Multnomah, Oregon, 97210, United States
- Coordinates: 45.5367°N 122.7053°W
- Website: pizzathief.com

Pizza Thief is a pizzeria based in Portland, Oregon, in the United States. The original restaurant in northwest Portland's Northwest District has a "sibling" adjacent bar called Bandit Bar. Chef and co-owner Darby Aldaco opened Pizza Thief with partner Tony Pasquale in 2021.

== Description ==
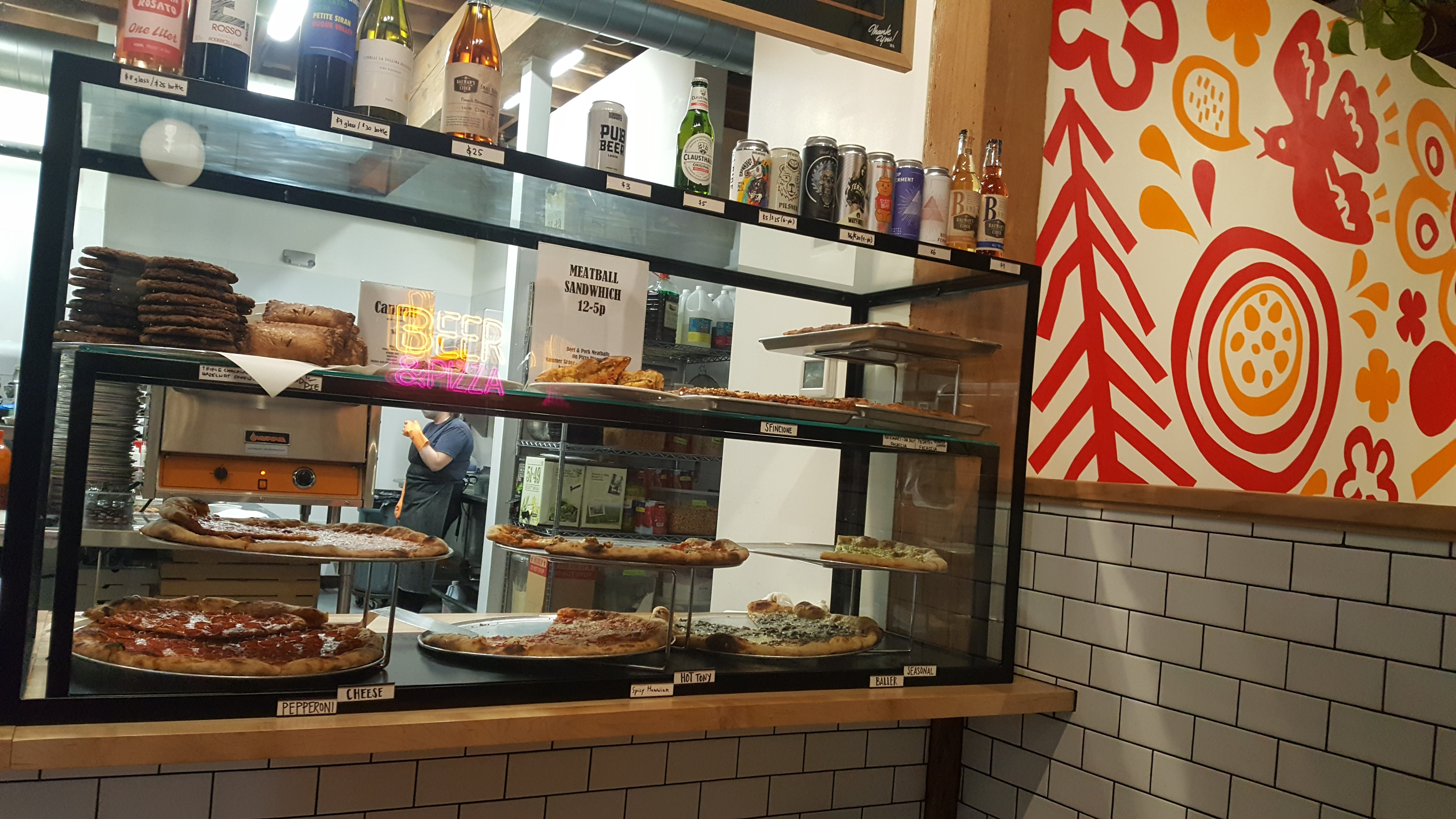
The restaurant's interior, 2022

Pizza Thief is a pizzeria based in Portland, Oregon. The original restaurant operates in northwest Portland's Northwest District. It has been described as "an open space, brightly painted to create a vibrant atmosphere". Willamette Week's Campy Draper said Pizza Thief is "bright and family-friendly with big windows, a pair of arcade cabinets, and tall walls covered with simple, colorful illustrations of flowers and raccoons. The service is walk-up, but should you bring the kiddos, you can easily keep them in sight." Adjacent to the pizzeria is Bandit Bar, operated by the same owners in the same building.

Pizza Thief's logo depicts a raccoon eating a slice of pizza.

=== Menu ===
The restaurant serves pizza, sometimes described as New York–style pizza. Pizza Thief's chef and co-owner has disputed the description and said, "People have been describing us as New York style. New York is big floppy pizza. Us having a slice shop is part of that. But I don't see New York making naturally leavened pizza crust.” Gluten-free pizzas are available. The Hot Tony has cheese, cured meats, and peppers. Pizza Thief has also served cookies.

== History ==
Chef and co-owner Darby Aldaco opened Pizza Thief with partner Tony Pasquale in May–June 2021. Great Notion Brewing Northwest began serving food by Pizza Thief in 2024. In July 2025, the business announced plans to open a third location in southeast Portland.

== Reception ==
Karen Brooks of Portland Monthly wrote, "You could mistake this for a New York pie, but don't. The crust is unmistakably Portland, tasting more like delicious sourdough bread than pizza crust—rugged and chewy, alive, tinged with local rye and spelt." She included the restaurant in a list of the city's best restaurants of 2021, and said Pizza Thief was one of three "newcomers [that] bolster the case that Portland is America's best pizza city".

In 2021, Brooke Jackson-Glidden included the pizzeria in Eater Portland's overview of "where to find exceptional pizzas in Portland", and wrote: "Pizza Thief still stands out for its take on a New York–style pizza, which retains the unfussy joy of a pepperoni slice with the signature tang of a sourdough pie. The shop's pepperoni has a nice char-dotted base with a serious dose of stretchy cheese, and the Hot Tony is absolutely piled with cured meats and peppers."

Emily Wilson included Pizza Thief in Bon Appétit's 2023 list of the eight best pizza establishments for a New York–style slice outside New York.

== See also ==
- List of pizza chains of the United States
- Pizza in Portland, Oregon
