= Grana Pizza Napoletana =

Pizzeria in Portland, Oregon, U.S.

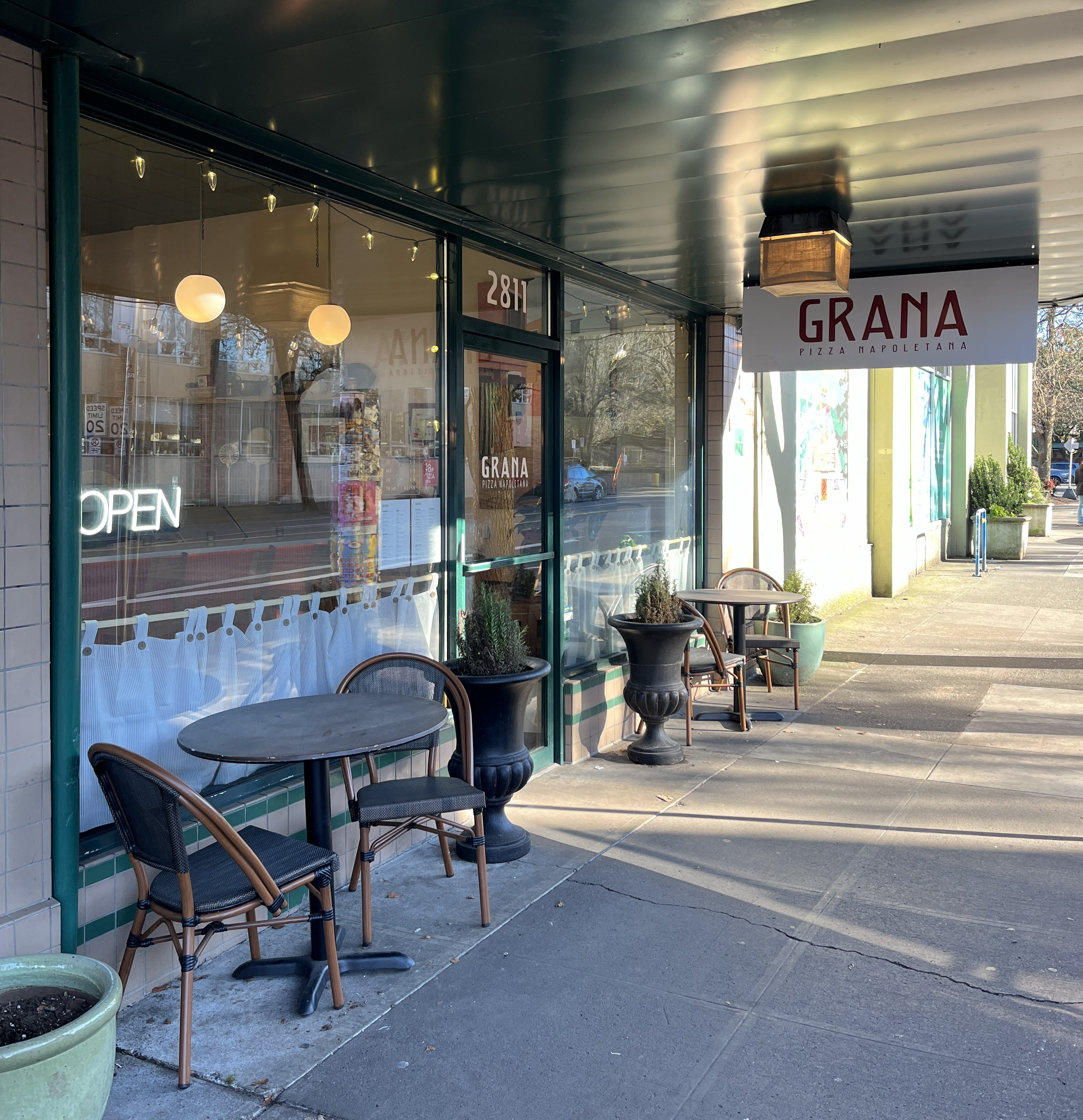
- The restaurant's exterior in 2025
- Interactive map of Grana Pizza Napoletana

Restaurant information
- Location: 2811 East Burnside Street, Portland, Multnomah, Oregon, 97214, United States
- Coordinates: 45.5230°N 122.6370°W
- Website: granapdx.com

Grana Pizza Napoletana, or simply Grana, is a pizzeria in Portland, Oregon, United States. Chris Flanagan and Maya Setton are co-owners.

== Description ==
Grana Pizza Napoletana operates on East Burnside Street, in the northeast Portland part of the Kerns neighborhood. The pizzeria specializes in Neapolitan pizza.

== History ==
Co-owners Chris Flanagan and Maya Setton opened Grana in a space that previously housed a Pizzicato location.

== See also ==
- Pizza in Portland, Oregon
