= Escape from New York Pizza =

Pizzeria in Portland, Oregon, U.S.

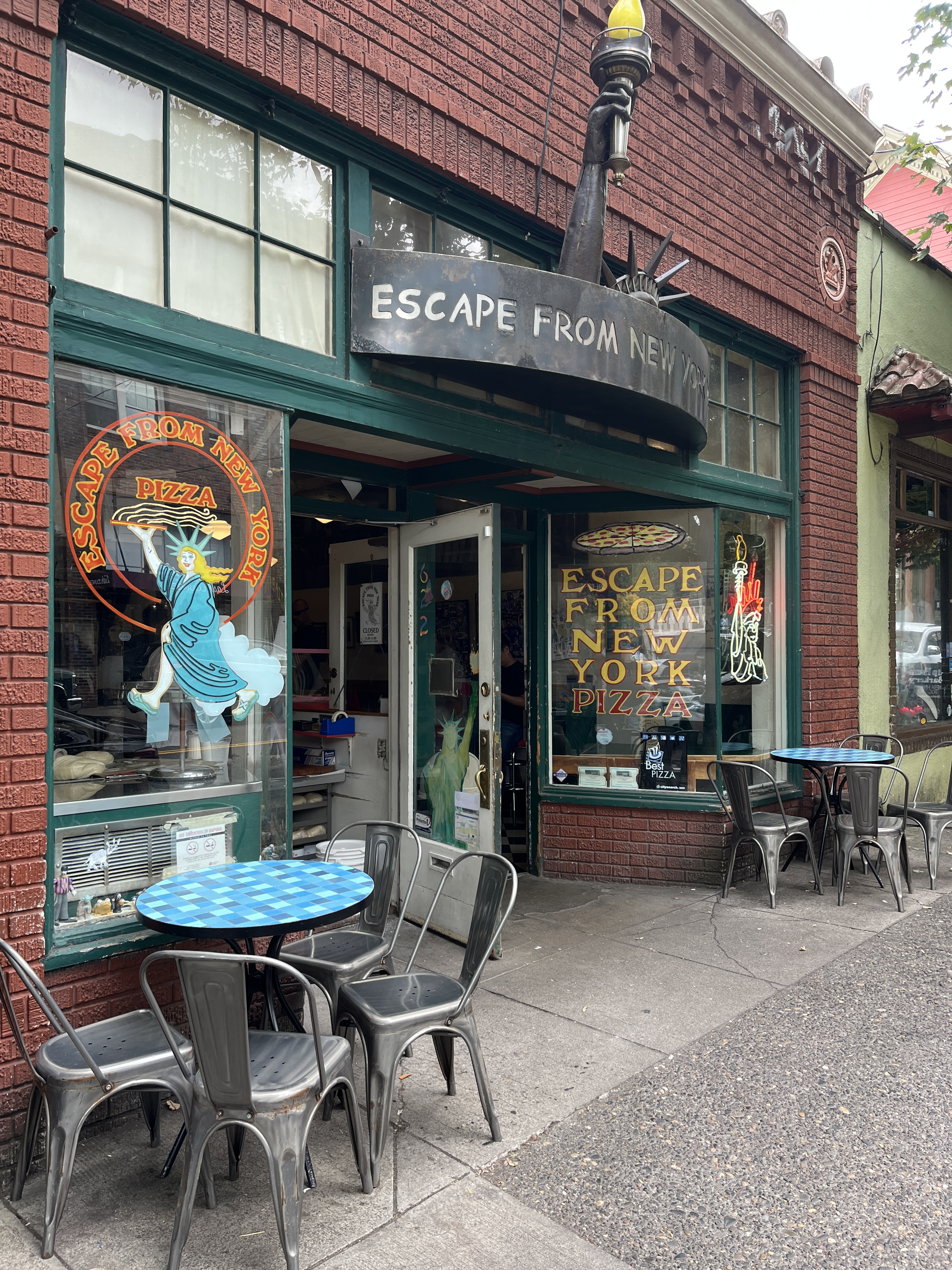
- The pizzeria's exterior in 2025
- Interactive map of Escape from New York Pizza

Restaurant information
- Established: 1983
- Owner: Phil Geffner
- Location: 622 Northwest 23rd Avenue, Portland, Multnomah, Oregon, 97210, United States
- Coordinates: 45.5273°N 122.6984°W
- Website: efnypizza.net

Escape from New York Pizza (EFNY) is a pizzeria in Portland, Oregon, United States.

== Description ==
Escape from New York Pizza (EFNY) is a pizzeria serving New York–style pizza on 23rd Avenue in northwest Portland's Northwest District. The interior features a narrow counter, and there are two outdoor tables, as of 2021. Cheese and pepperoni pizza by the slice are served on paper plates.

== History ==
EFNY was established in 1983. Prior to relocating to 23rd Avenue, the pizzeria operated "just below" 10th Avenue in downtown Portland. According to Byron Beck of Eater Portland, "EFNYP was the first very place in Portland where you could buy pizza by the slice: authentic New York–style, thin-crust pizza that was easy to fold and cheap on the wallet." Phil Geffner is the owner.

The pizzeria began accepting credit and debit cards in 2013. According to Sara Hottman of The Oregonian, Geffner "refused to serve salads, provide ranch dressing or delivery, or take credit or debit cards for just more than 30 years." For the business's 35th anniversary, free pizza slices were given to guests in June 2018.

== Reception ==
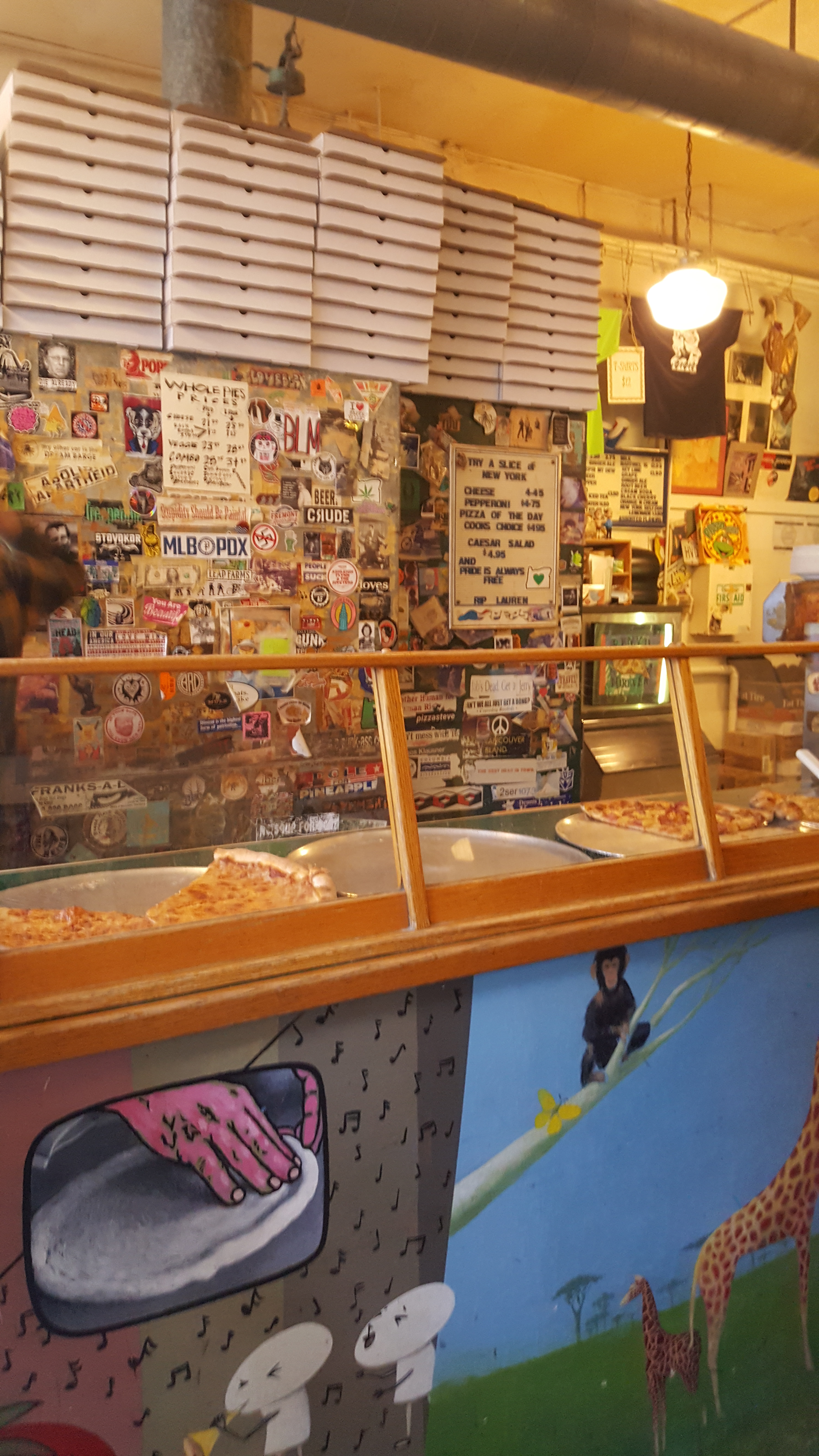
Interior, 2022

In 2013 and 2018, Michael Russell of The Oregonian ranked EFNY number three and number four, respectively, in lists of Portland's best pizza by the slice. He described EFNY as "the elder statesman of local pie-slingers" and said, the cheese slice "is large enough to hang well off the edges of a paper plate, floppy with a hint of crunch, with salty mozzarella and spicy sauce, always served hot enough that a bite taken within the time it takes to walk four blocks will land you in the burn ward at Legacy Good Samaritan Medical Center."

Willamette Week included EFNYs pepperoni slice in a 2018 list of "Eight Great Single-Serve Pizzas and Slices in Portland". The newspaper said EFNY "has been here so long it has, indeed, escaped New York: Getting a pepperoni slice with long-proofed dough, sweet red sauce and generous mozzarella has become Portland's greatest and longest-running pizza tradition—as has getting ribbed a bit by owner Phil Geffner when you come in." In his 2018 quest to find Portland's best pizza by the slice, the Portland Mercury's Chad Walsh wrote:

With its fuck-it attitude, no ranch ethos, and walls covered in photos of the past three-plus decades, it's definitely the best place to grab a slice. But does the pie do the work? Sure. The pepperonis, cheese, and sauce were in harmony with one another. My only complaint is that it could’ve been a little warmer. But that was sort of a blessing, because the grease didn’t burn my skin when it slipped off the slice and dribbled down my wrist.

Alex Frane included EFNY in Thrillist's 2020 overview of "The Absolute Best Pizza in Portland", writing, "Fact: Escape has the most authentic New York slices in the city... Escape From New York has been serving its reheated slices of pepperoni and cheese pizzas out of its narrow, dingy space since 1983 to an unending audience, and for that, we've gotta give it up." Nathan Williams included EFNY in Eater Portland's 2021 overview of "Where to Grab Pizza by the Slice in and Around Portland". He wrote, "The cheese vs. sauce needle here is tipped heavily towards the mozzarella end of the scale, making an Escape From New York a sound end-of-night counter-balance to that last drink you had at the bar. Unlike newer spots that strain to achieve the patina of an old-school pizza parlor, EFNY is the real deal, complete with service that is more New York–brusque than Portland-passive."

== See also ==
- Pizza in Portland, Oregon
