= Silver Dollar Pizza =

Restaurant and sports bar in Portland, Oregon, U.S.

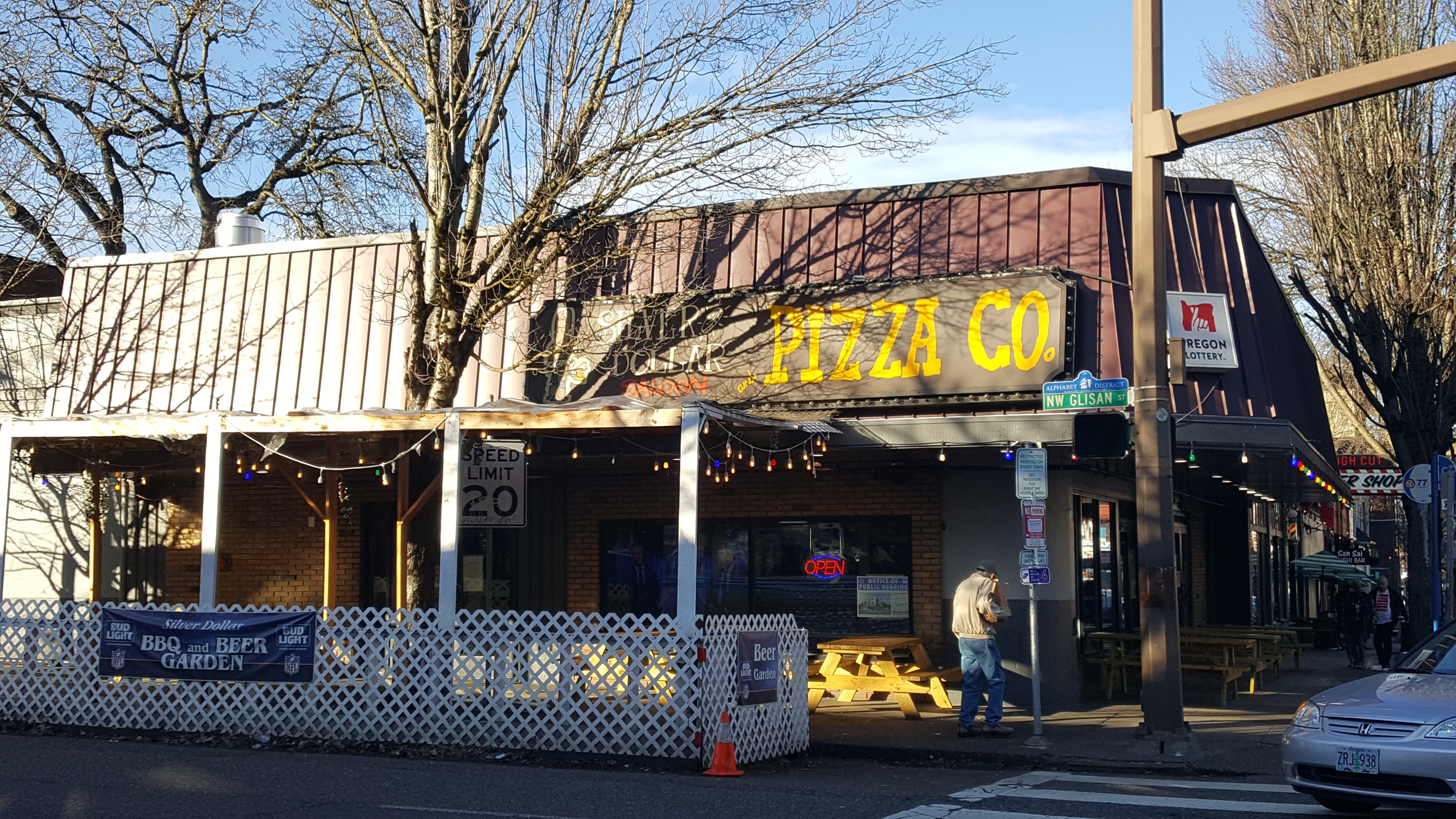
- The restaurant's exterior in 2022
- Interactive map of Silver Dollar Pizza

Restaurant information
- Owner: Sam Macbale
- Food type: Italian (pizza)
- Location: 501 Northwest 21st Avenue, Portland, Multnomah, Oregon, 97209, United States
- Coordinates: 45.5264°N 122.6946°W
- Website: silverdollarpizza.com

Silver Dollar Pizza is a pizzeria and sports bar in Portland, Oregon.

== Description ==
Silver Dollar Pizza is a pizzeria and sports bar on 21st Avenue in northwest Portland's Northwest District. In 2019, Alex Frane of Eater Portland described Silver Dollar as "a bar that's just as much about the games on the floor as the games on the TV". The interior features air hockey, darts, fooseball, hoops, shuffleboard, table tennis, and video poker. The bar is known for screening Portland Winterhawks games. Thrillist says, "This wood-paneled place has a college-bar feel with ping pong and pool tables and plenty of beer. TVs are always showing the games and the atmosphere is relaxed if mildly noisy."

== History ==
In 2010, the business was among 14 businesses which applied for exemption of an ordinance "specifically prohibiting the storage of trash receptacles in public rights-of-way, except for collection purposes". In 2014, the Oregon Liquor Control Commission (OLCC) temporarily suspended the business' liquor license. In response, Silver Dollar posted a sign on the door which said, "The OLCC has ludicrously decided to punish us ... because we allowed a minor to work in our kitchen."

During the COVID-19 pandemic, owner Sam MacBale initially supported the mask mandates, social distancing requirements, and business occupancy limits proposed by the Oregon Occupational Safety and Health Division and the OLCC. In 2020, he received a permit for outdoor seating from the Winter Healthy Businesses Program. The patio was covered and lights and plants were added.

In 2021, one person was killed and two more were injured after a shooting at the restaurant. A suspect was arrested approximately six months later.

=== Affiliated businesses ===
Logo for Silver Dollar II

MacBale converted La Bella Napoli into Silver Dollar II Pizza Sports Bar, or simply Silver Dollar II. The sports bar was "recently closed", as of October 2014. By 2015, Silver Dollar II was replaced by Broadway on Deck, an outpost of On Deck Sports Bar Grill. The Oregonian said Silver Dollar II operated on Northwest Fifth Avenue, as of 2022.

Silver Dollar Pizza is also affiliated with nearby Underdog Sportsbar.

== Reception ==
In 2018, Ben Stone and Tyler Pell of Willamette Week called Silver Dollar the "most high-octane" option for table tennis in Portland. Alex Frane included Silver Dollar in Eater Portland's 2019 list of 15 "ideal Portland sports bars for catching the game", in which he wrote, "The pizza itself isn't mind-blowing, but slices are reliable, cheap, and good for soaking up some draught beers and cheap well drinks."

== See also ==
- Pizza in Portland, Oregon
