= Dove Vivi =

Pizzeria in Portland, Oregon, U.S.

- Interactive map of Dove Vivi

Restaurant information
- Established: 2007
- Owners: Delane and Gavin Blackstock
- Food type: Italian (pizza)
- Location: Portland, Multnomah, Oregon, 97232, United States
- Coordinates: 45.5267°N 122.6377°W
- Website: dovevivipizza.co

Dove Vivi is a pizzeria in Portland, Oregon. Owners Delane and Gavin Blackstock opened the restaurant in 2007, in the northeast Portland part of the Kerns neighborhood.

== Description ==
Dove Vivi is a pizzeria in the northeast Portland part of the Kerns neighborhood. According to Matthew Singer of Willamette Week, the restaurant has a "twee-rustic décor". Dove Vivi makes cornmeal crusts and uses "innovative" and "unusual" toppings such as corned beef, eggplant, goat cheese, sauerkraut, sausage, and sweet corn. The business offers vegan options. The Corn Cashew pizza has cashew cheese, vegan roasted red peppers, caramelized onions, chives, sweet corn, and smoked tomatoes. The Pesto Pizza has ricotta and spinach pesto. Dove Vivi uses a simple heart logo.

== History ==
Owners Delane and Gavin Blackstock opened the restaurant in 2007.

== Reception ==
Writers for Portland Monthly included the Corn Cashew pizza in a 2016 list of the city's ten best healthy dishes.

== See also ==
- Pizza in Portland, Oregon
