= Via Tribunali =

Pizzeria in Seattle, Washington, U.S.

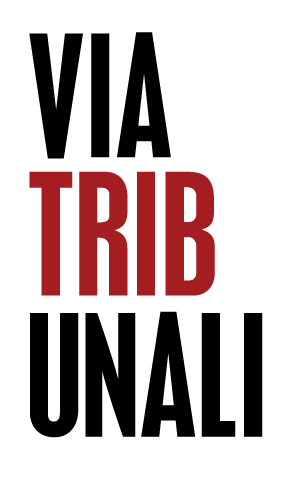

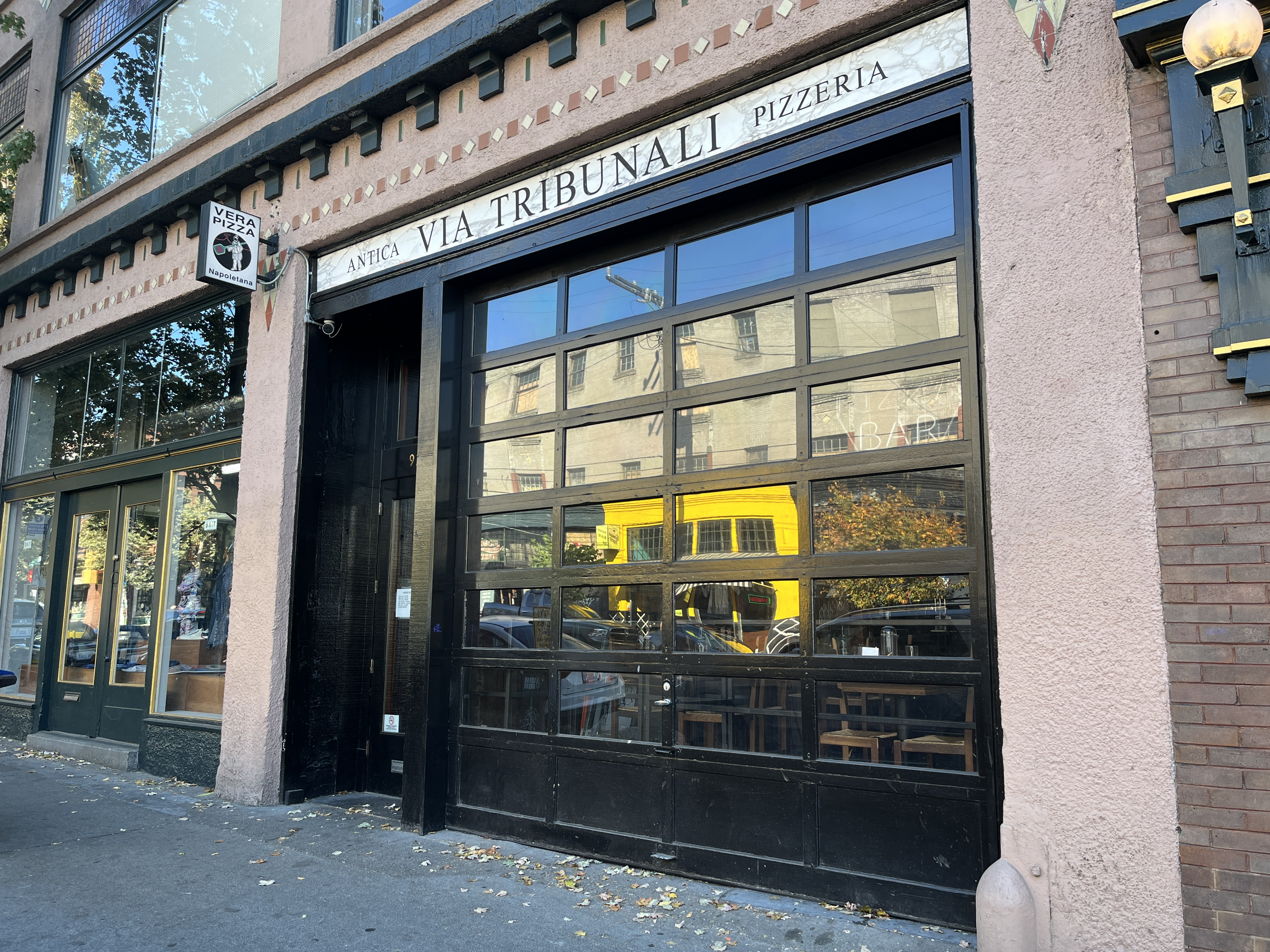
- Exterior of the Capitol Hill restaurant, 2022

Restaurant information
- Location: Seattle, Washington, United States
- Website: viatribunali.com

Via Tribunali is a pizzeria with two locations in Seattle, in the U.S. state of Washington. Currently operating the city's Capitol Hill and Queen Anne neighborhoods, the restaurant previously operated in the Georgetown neighborhood and in New York City and Portland, Oregon. The business was established in 2004.

== Description ==
The Italian restaurant specializes in Neapolitan pizzas. The salame has salame piccante, pomodoro, mozzarella, basil, and grana padano. The menu has also included calzones, tartufo, and cocktails.

== History ==
The Portland restaurant opened in the southwest Portland part of Old Town Chinatown in 2011 and closed in 2015.

Mark McConnell and Cecilia Rikard own the business as of 2022.

== See also ==
- List of pizza chains of the United States
- Pizza in Portland, Oregon
