= Ranch Pizza =

Pizza chain based in Portland, Oregon, U.S.

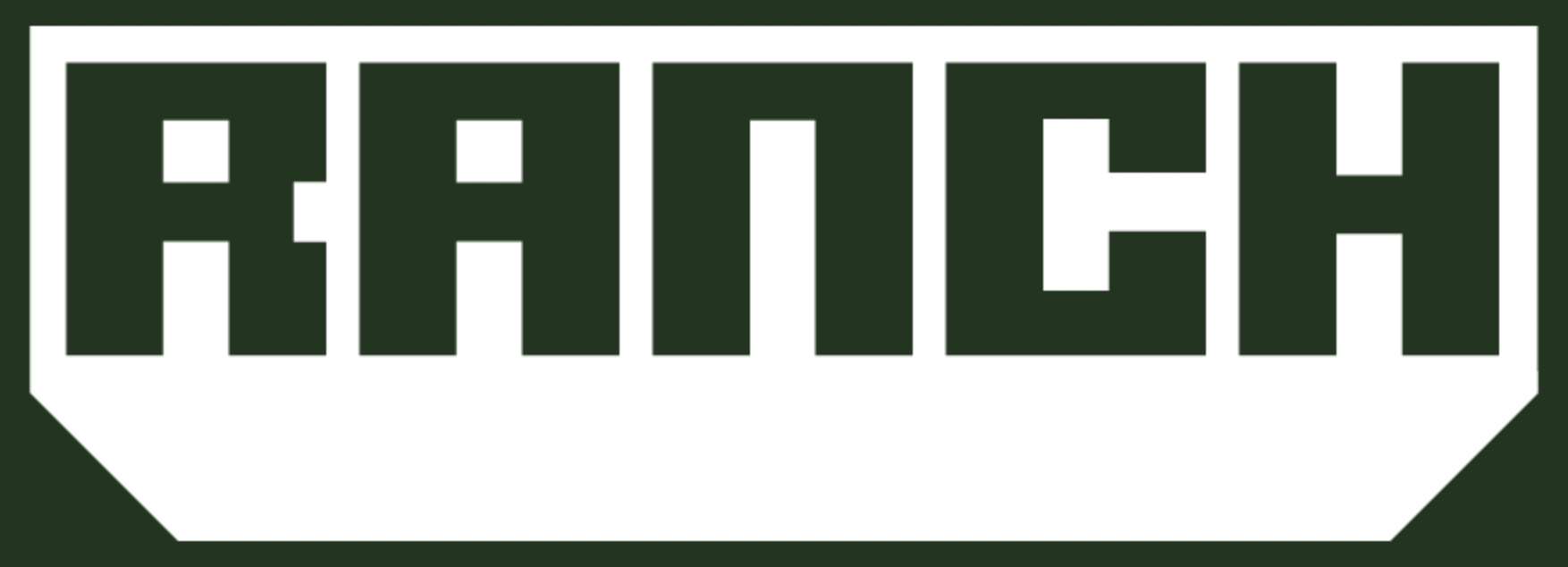

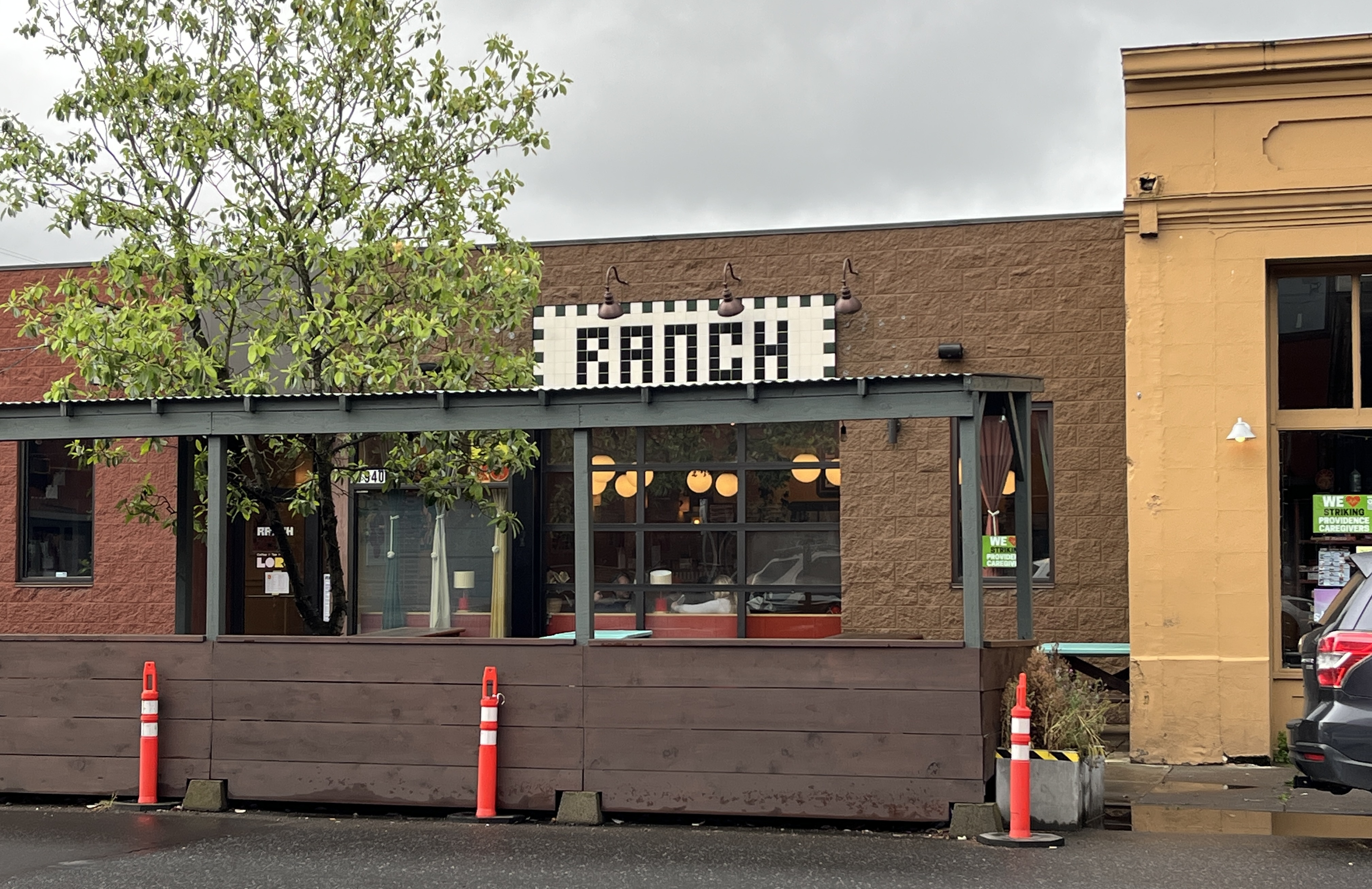
- Exterior of the restaurant in the southeast Portland part of the Montavilla neighborhood in 2025

Restaurant information
- Owners: Richard Corey; Eric Wood
- Location: Oregon, United States
- Website: ranchpdx.com

Ranch Pizza (sometimes called Ranch PDX) is a pizzeria based in Portland, Oregon, United States. Owned by Richard Corey and Eric Wood, the business has eight locations in the Portland metropolitan area. In addition to the original restaurant in northeast Portland's Woodlawn neighborhood, Ranch operates in Hillsboro and in the southeast Portland part of the Montavilla neighborhood.

== Description and history ==
The original restaurant opened on Dekum Street in northeast Portland's Woodlawn neighborhood. A second location opened on 21st Avenue in northwest Portland's Northwest District in 2019.

A seventh location opened in Hillsboro in April 2024.

The eighth location operates on Stark Street in the southeast Portland part of the Montavilla neighborhood.

== Reception ==
Alex Frane included Ranch Pizza in Thrillist's 202 list of Portland's best pizza. Lindsay D. Mattison ranked the pizzeria eighth in Tasting Table's 2023 overview of Portland's best pizza.

== See also ==
- List of pizza chains of the United States
- Pizza in Portland, Oregon
