= Atlas Pizza =

Pizzeria in Portland, Oregon, U.S.

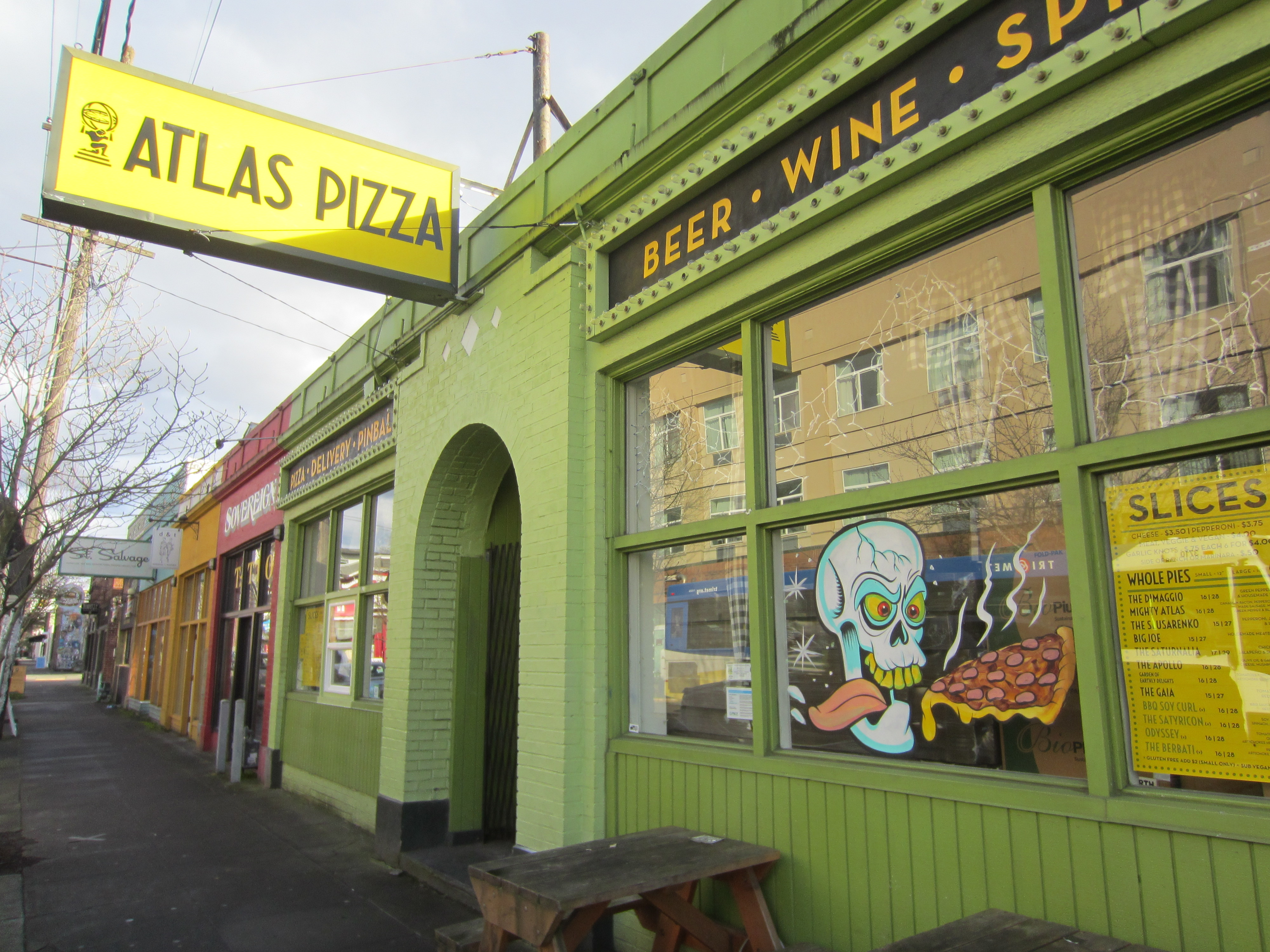
- Exterior of the Division Street pizzeria in 2021
- Interactive map of Atlas Pizza

Restaurant information
- Established: 2014
- Owners: Eli Johnson; John Ricci
- Food type: Pizza
- Location: Portland, Oregon, United States
- Coordinates: 45.5047°N 122.6270°W
- Website: atlaspizzapdx.com

Atlas Pizza is a pizzeria with multiple locations in Portland, Oregon, United States.

== Description ==
Atlas Pizza serves New York–style pizza. The Sluzrenko has pepperoni, pineapple, and jalapeño.

== History ==
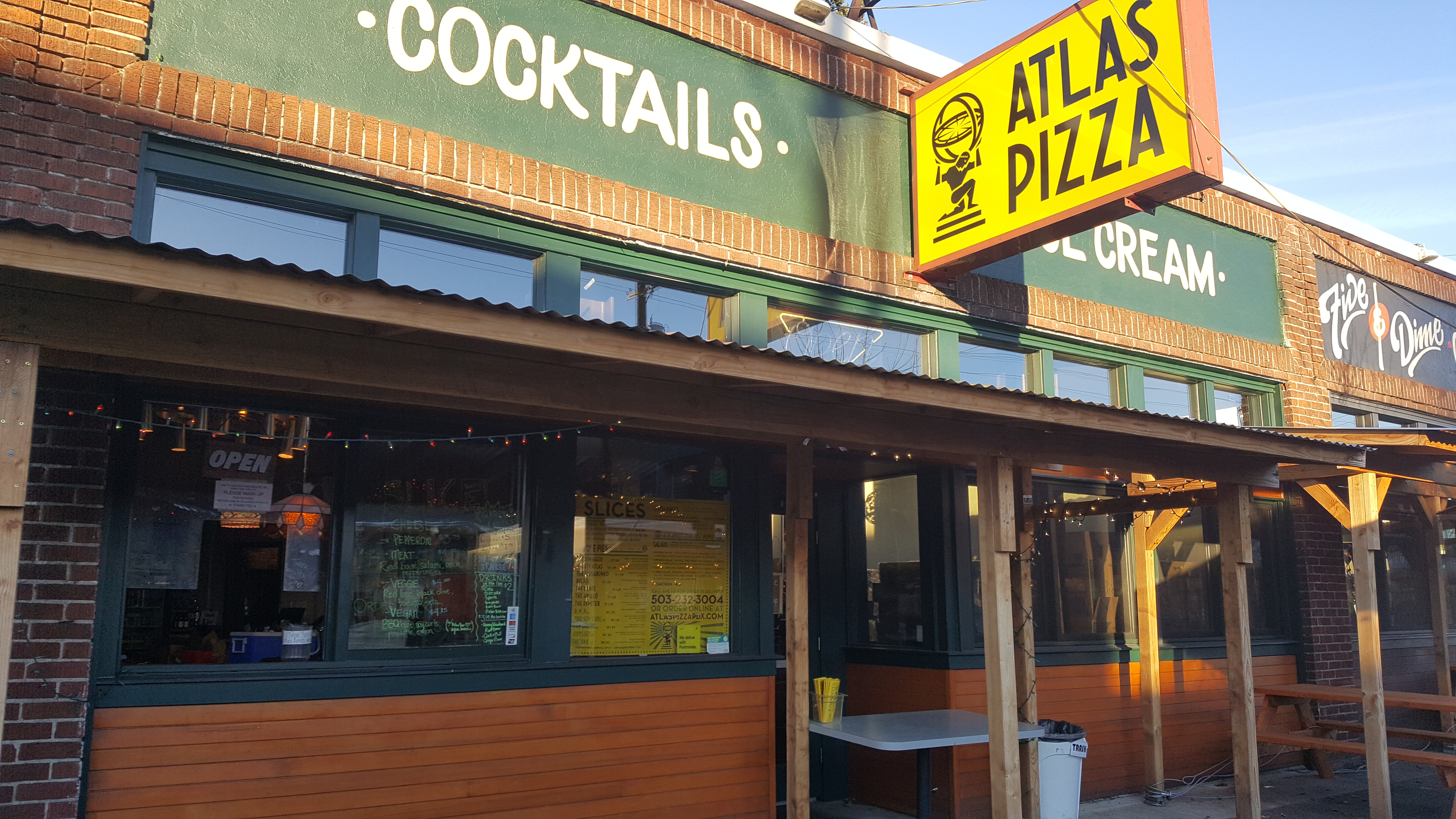
Exterior of the Foster-Powell pizzeria, 2022

The original pizzeria opened on Division Street in southeast Portland's Richmond neighborhood in 2014, using the space previously occupied by Road Runner Café. A second opened on North Killingsworth Street in the Humboldt neighborhood in 2017, and a third opened on Foster Road in southeast Portland's Foster-Powell neighborhood in 2019.

Eli Johnson and John Ricci are co-owners. The Black-owned business participated in Black Restaurant Week in 2021. During the COVID-19 pandemic, the business saw increased labor and product costs.

== Reception ==
Nathan Williams included Atlas Pizza in Eater Portland's 2021 list of "Where to Grab Pizza by the Slice in and Around Portland".

== See also ==
- List of Black-owned restaurants
- Pizza in Portland, Oregon
