= Pan Con Queso =

Pizzeria in Portland, Oregon, U.S.

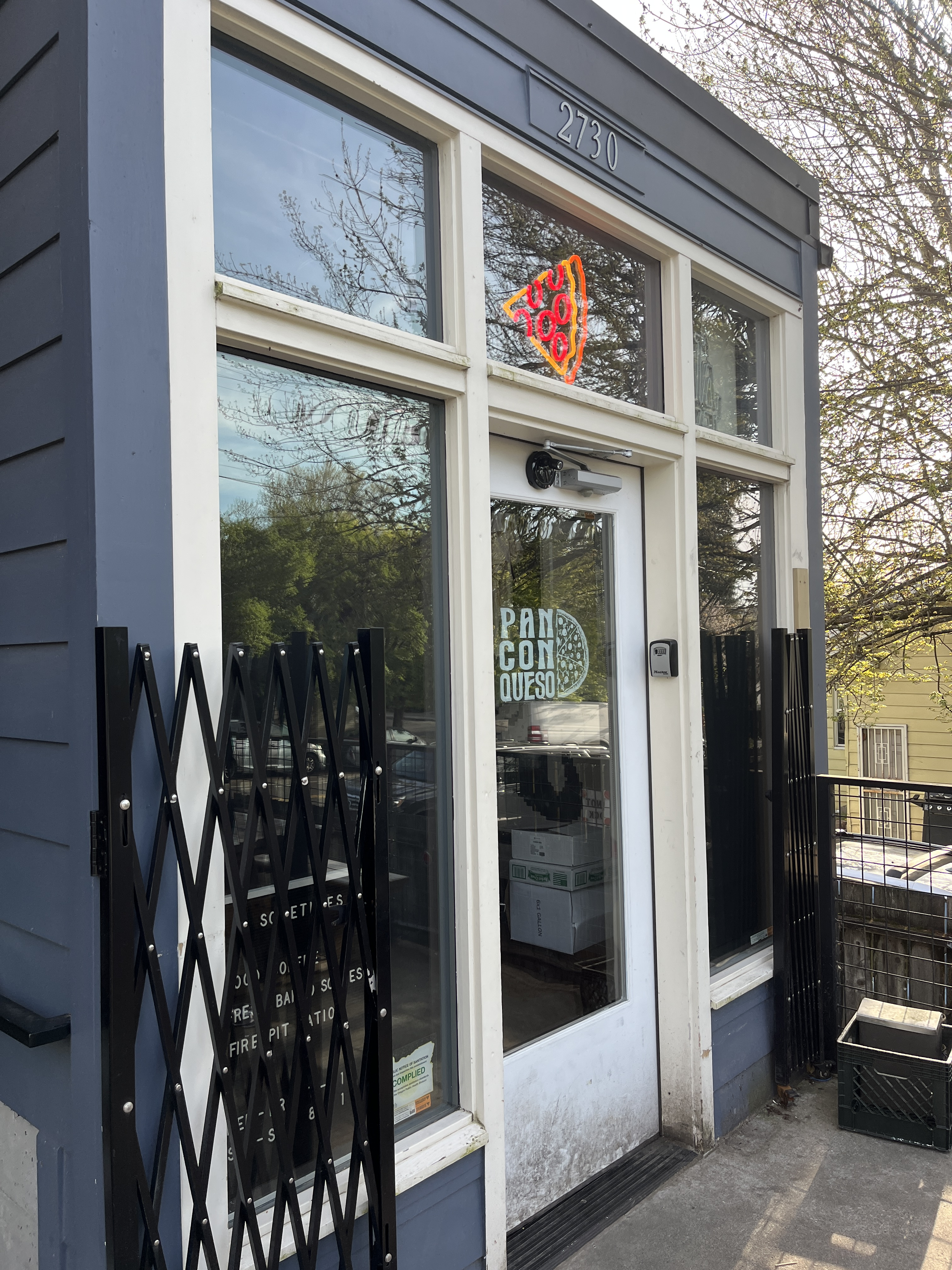
- The restaurant's exterior, 2026
- Interactive map of Pan Con Queso

Restaurant information
- Location: 2730 Southeast Gladstone Street, Portland, Multnomah, Oregon, 97202, United States
- Coordinates: 45.4932°N 122.6379°W

Pan Con Queso is a pizzeria in Portland, Oregon, United States.

== Description ==
The pizzeria Pan Con Queso operates in southeast Portland's Creston-Kenilworth neighborhood. It serves "naturally leavened modernist" personal size pizzas, inspired by the owners' "combined Mexican and Pacific Islander heritage". The business uses ingredients like aioli with chipotle, as well as corn, cotija cheese, chorizo, and pickled jalapeño. The Mr. MacArthur pizza, named after one of the owner's grandfather, has onion, pineapple, and Spam. Another pizza is called the Kevin McCallister, inspired by the character in the 1990 film Home Alone. Pan Con Queso's menu has also included a salad with arugula and watermelon, another with chamoy vinaigrette, a canned fish plate, and desserts such as amaretto flan and Mexican-spiced cookies with chili powder.

== History ==
Pan Con Queso started as a pop-up restaurant within the brewery Living Häus. Pan Con Queso is operated by Henry Martinez, who previously worked at Dimo's Apizza and Scottie's Pizza Parlor, and Makeila Magno. The first pop-up was held in April 2023, and the owners of Living Häus invited Pan Con Queso to use the kitchen full-time in June.

Pan Con Queso has used an electric PizzaMaster oven. In 2024, owner announced plans to open a brick and mortar restaurant in the 300-square-foot space previously occupied by The Electric Pizza Company, in southeast Portland's Creston-Kenilworth neighborhood. The restaurant opened on June 1, 2024.

== Reception ==
The Oregonian included Pan Con Queso in a list of Portland's five best new pizzerias of 2023. The newspaper's Michael Russell also called the business a "standout newcomer".

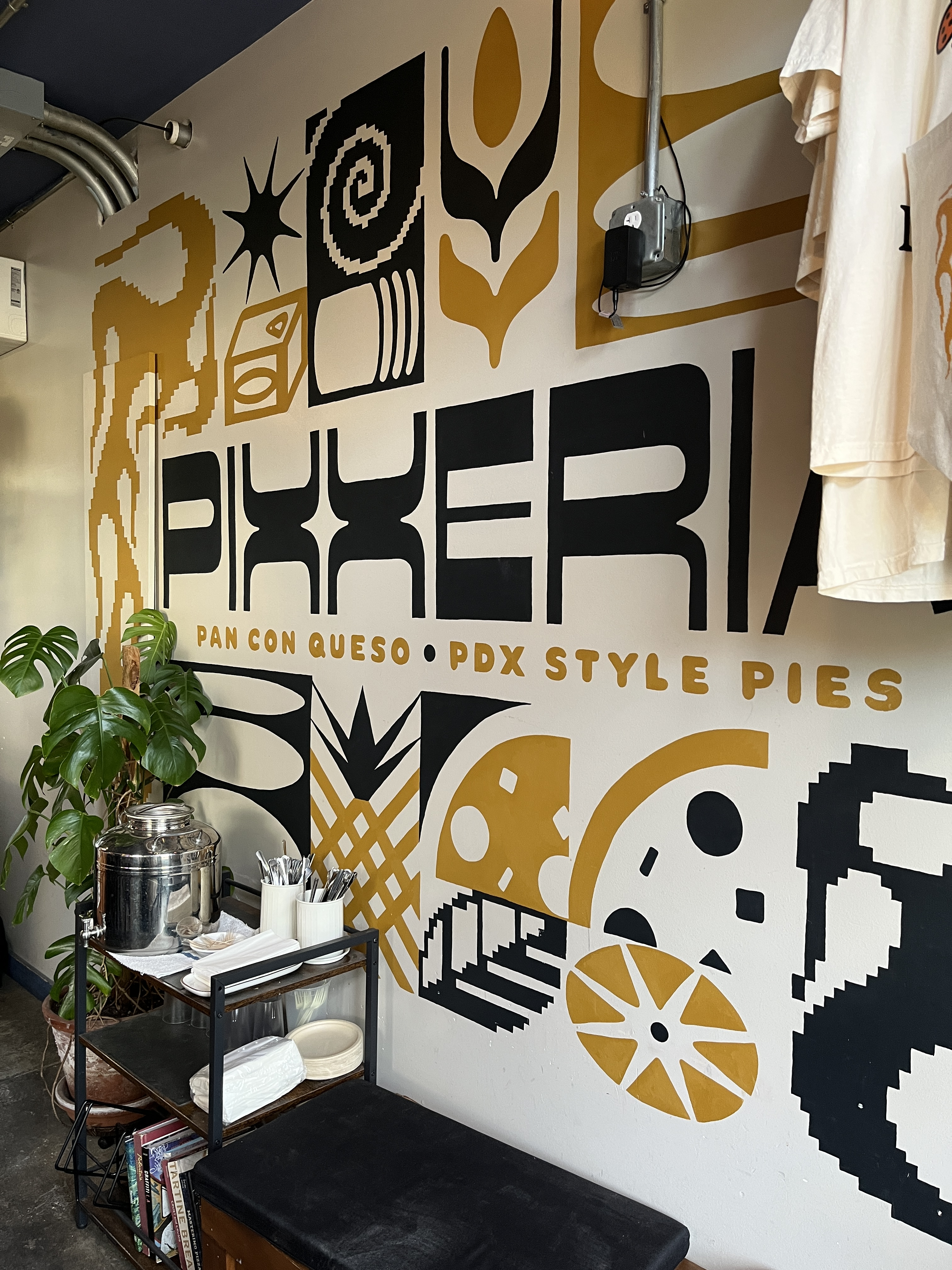
Interior

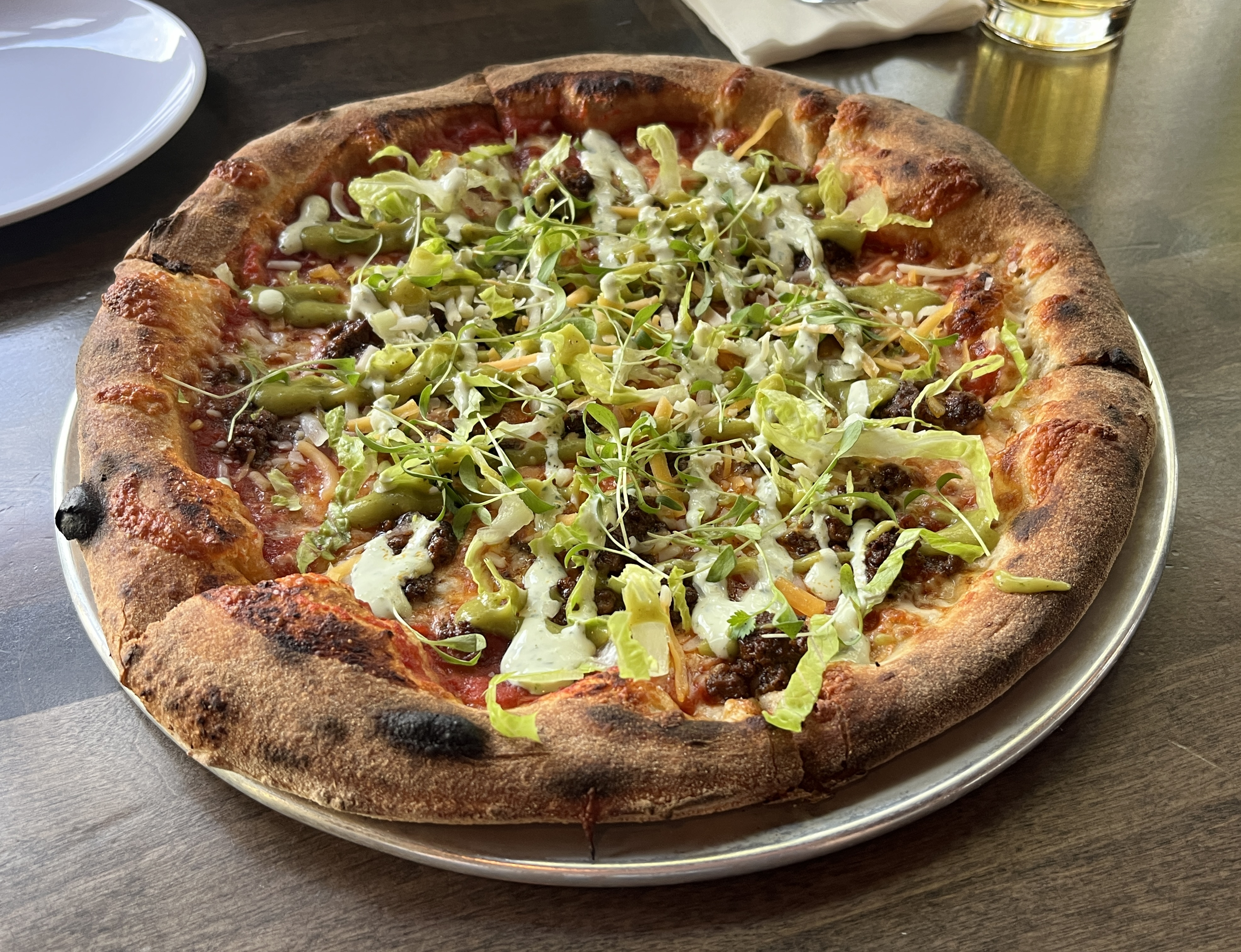
Taco pizza
