= Ken's Artisan Pizza =

Pizzeria in Portland, Oregon, U.S.

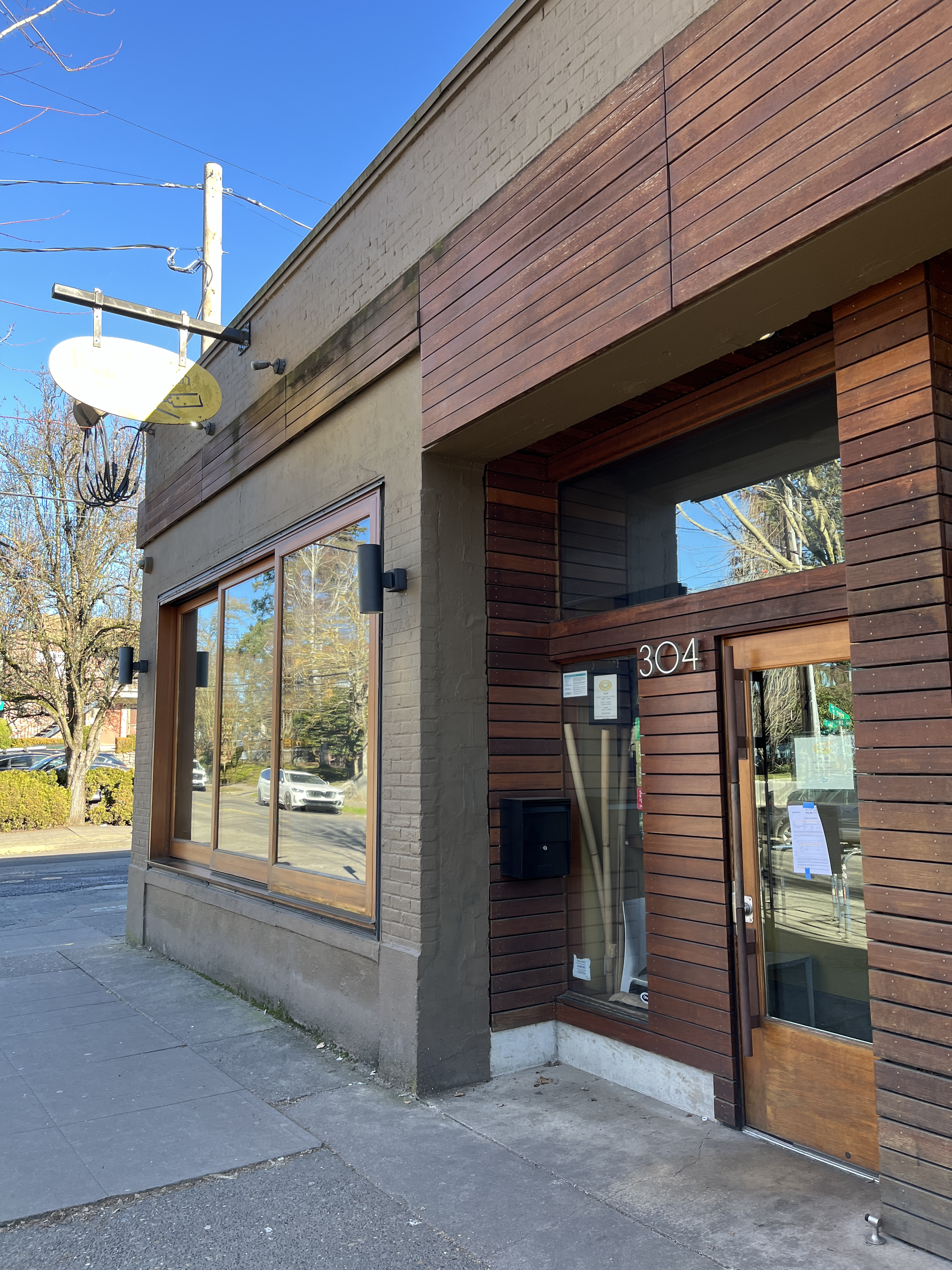
- The restaurant's exterior, 2025
- Interactive map of Ken's Artisan Pizza

Restaurant information
- Established: 2006
- Food type: Pizza
- Location: 304 Southeast 28th Avenue, Portland, Multnomah, Oregon, 97214, United States
- Coordinates: 45°31′14″N 122°38′14″W

Ken's Artisan Pizza is a pizzeria in southeast Portland, Oregon, United States. In 2024, the business announced plans to expand to Bend.

== Description ==
Ken's Artisan Pizza serves Neapolitan pizza.

== History ==
The pizzeria opened in Portland's Kerns neighborhood in 2006.

An outpost is slated to open in Bend, Oregon, in 2025.

The business participated in Portland Dining Month in 2026.

== Reception ==
In 2017, Samantha Bakall of The Oregonian ranked Ken's number one on her list of "Portland's 27 best wood-fired pizzas". Michael Russell ranked the business number 25 in the newspaper's 2025 list of Portland's 40 best restaurants. Brooke Jackson-Glidden and Alex Frane of Eater Portland included the restaurant in their 2019 list of "15 Essential Pizzerias in Portland".

== See also ==
- Pizza in Portland, Oregon
