= Apizza Scholls =

Pizzeria in Portland, Oregon, U.S.

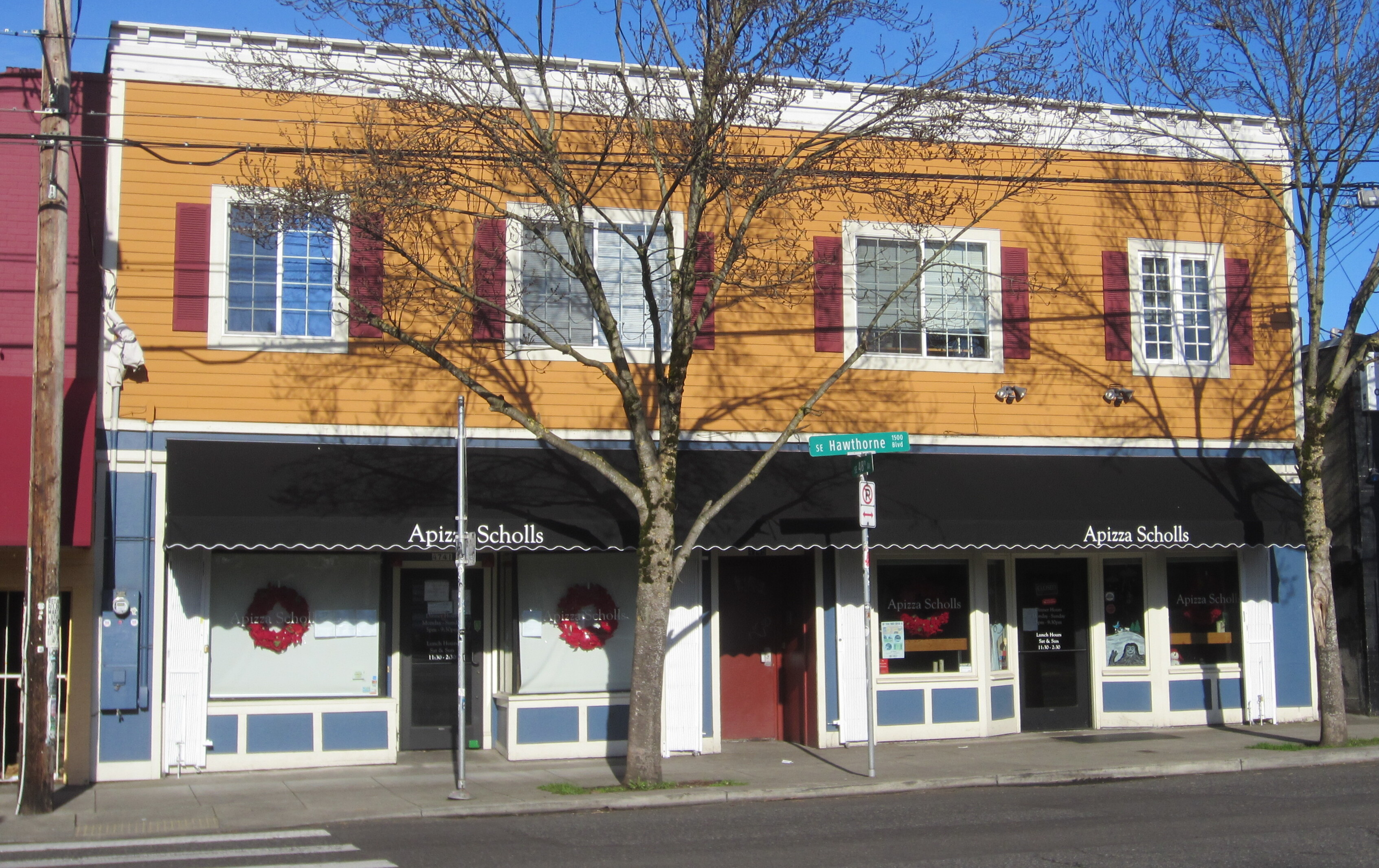
- The restaurant's exterior in 2021
- Interactive map of Apizza Scholls

Restaurant information
- Established: 2005
- Owners: Brian Spangler; Kim Nyland
- Location: 4741 Southeast Hawthorne Boulevard, Portland, Oregon, 97215, United States
- Coordinates: 45.5121°N 122.6131°W
- Website: apizzascholls.com

Apizza Scholls is a pizzeria in Portland, Oregon's Sunnyside neighborhood, in the United States. The pizzeria was started in 2005 by Brian Spangler-and Kim Nyland.

== Reception ==
Michael Russell included the business in The Oregonian's 2025 list of the 21 best restaurants in southeast Portland. He also ranked Apizza Scholls number 10 in the newspaper's 2025 list of Portland's 40 best restaurants.

== See also ==
- Pizza in Portland, Oregon
