= List of restaurants in Portland, Oregon =

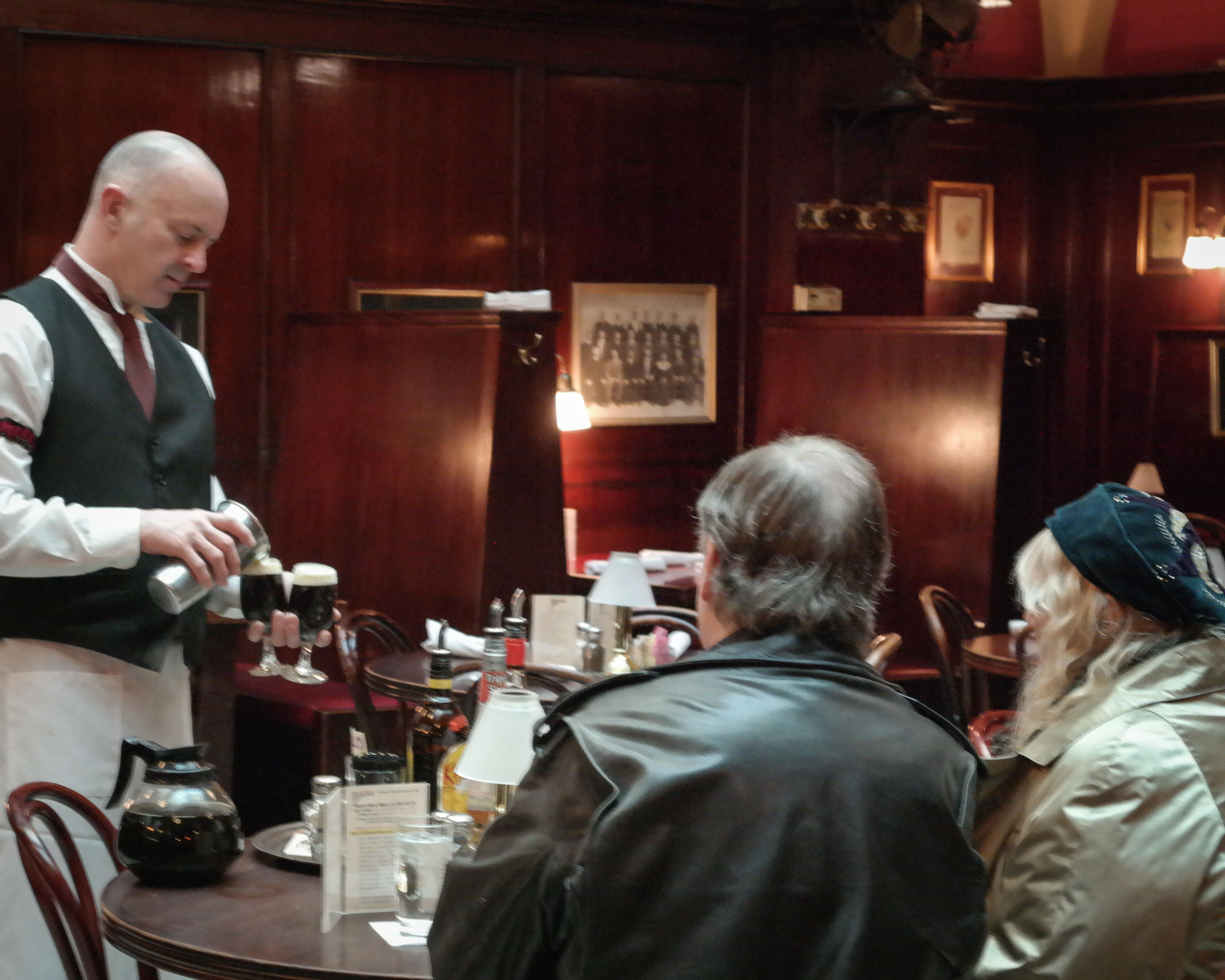
Bartender preparing Spanish coffee at Huber's, which bills itself as Portland, Oregon's oldest restaurant, in 2014

Following are currently operating notable restaurants in Portland, Oregon:

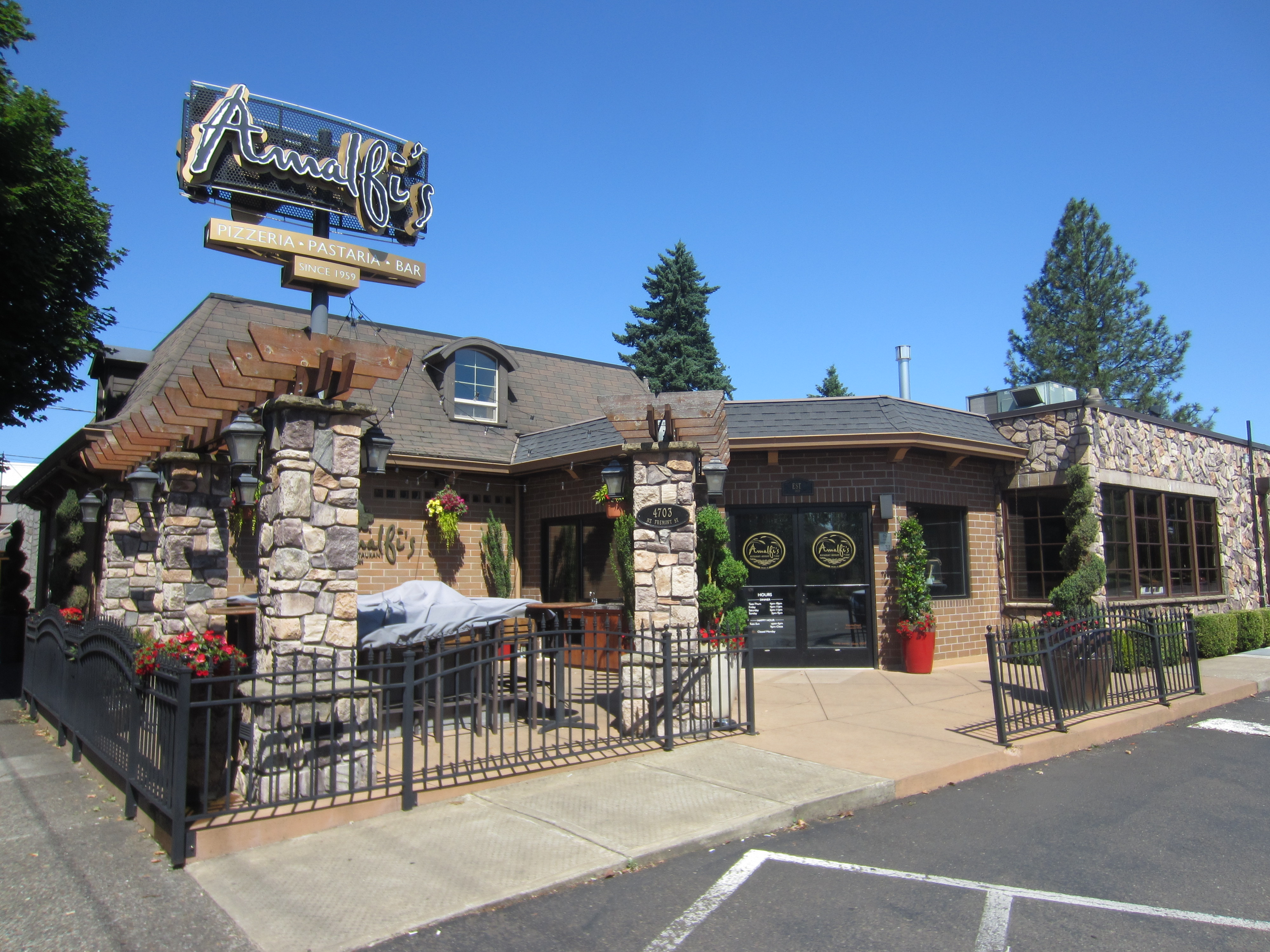
Amalfi's Italian Restaurant

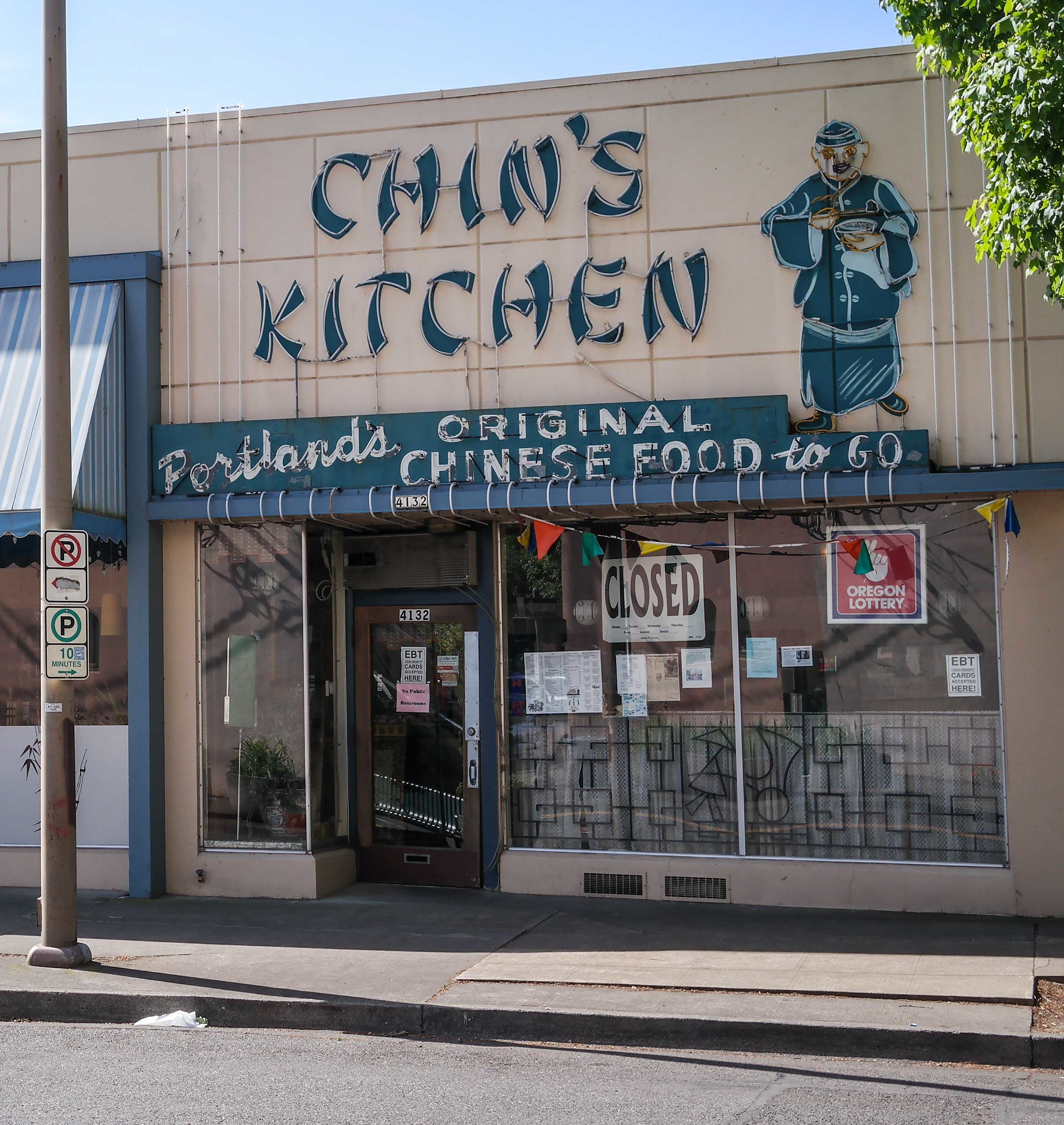
Chin's Kitchen

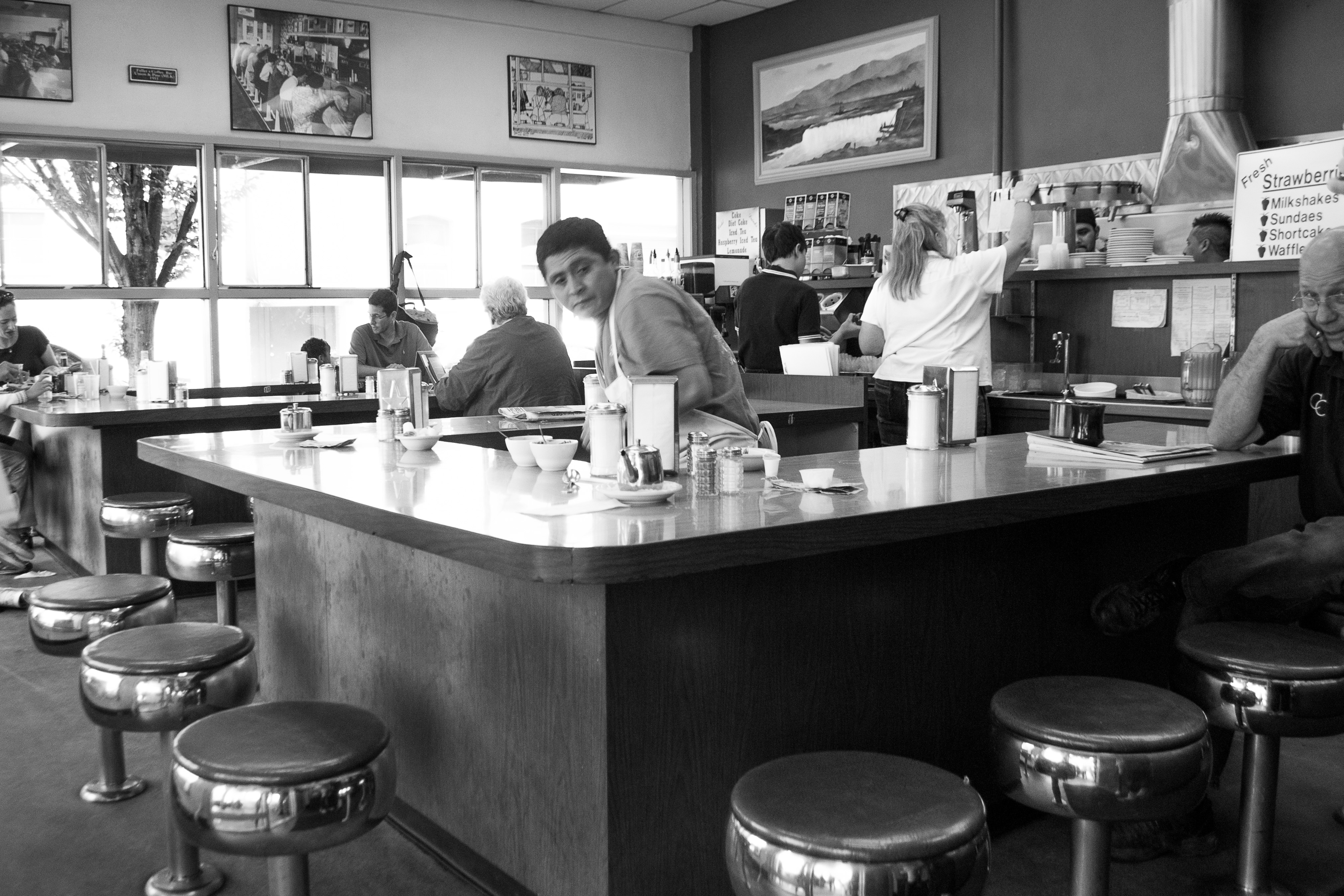
Fuller's Coffee Shop

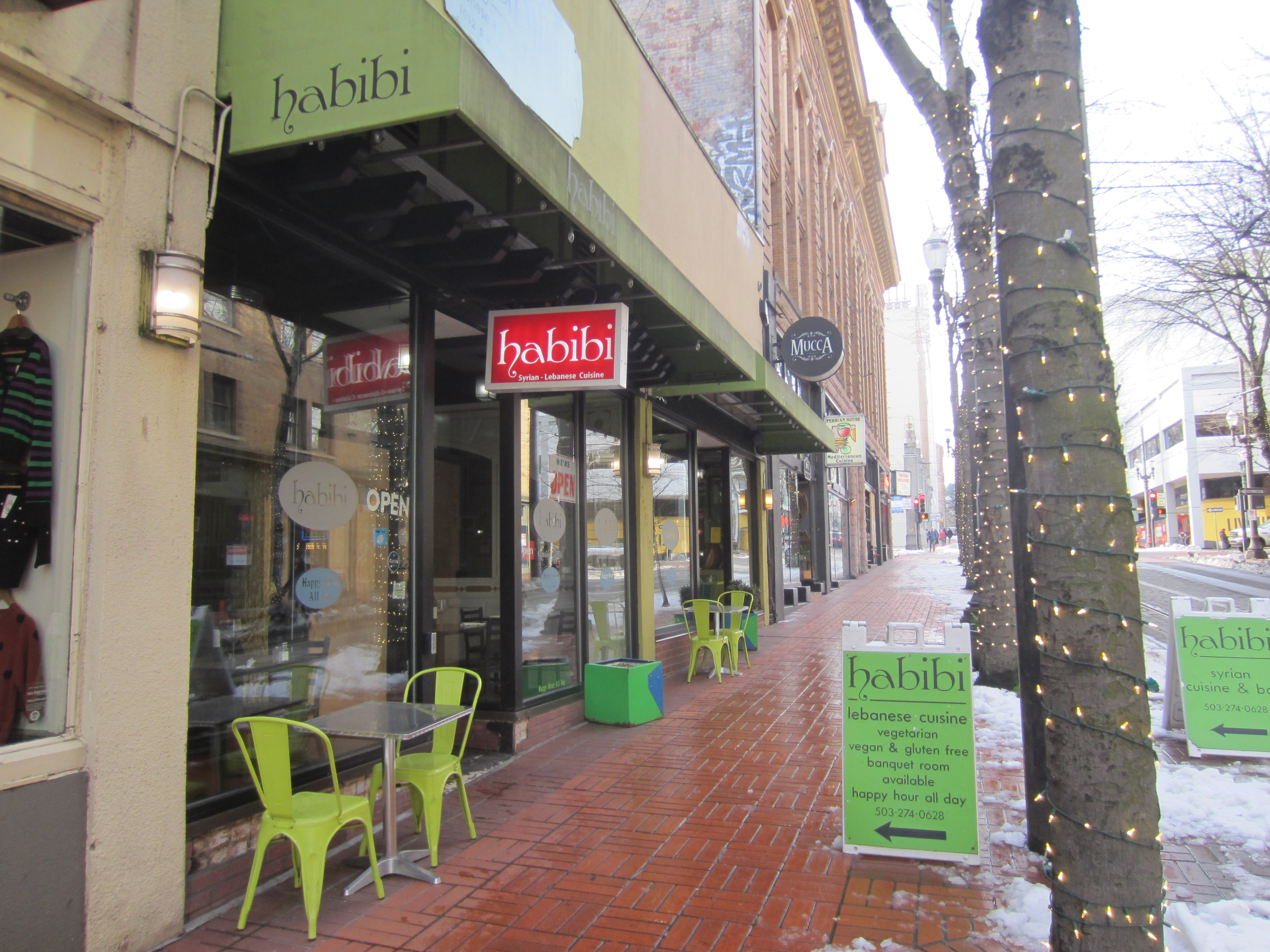
Habibi Restaurant

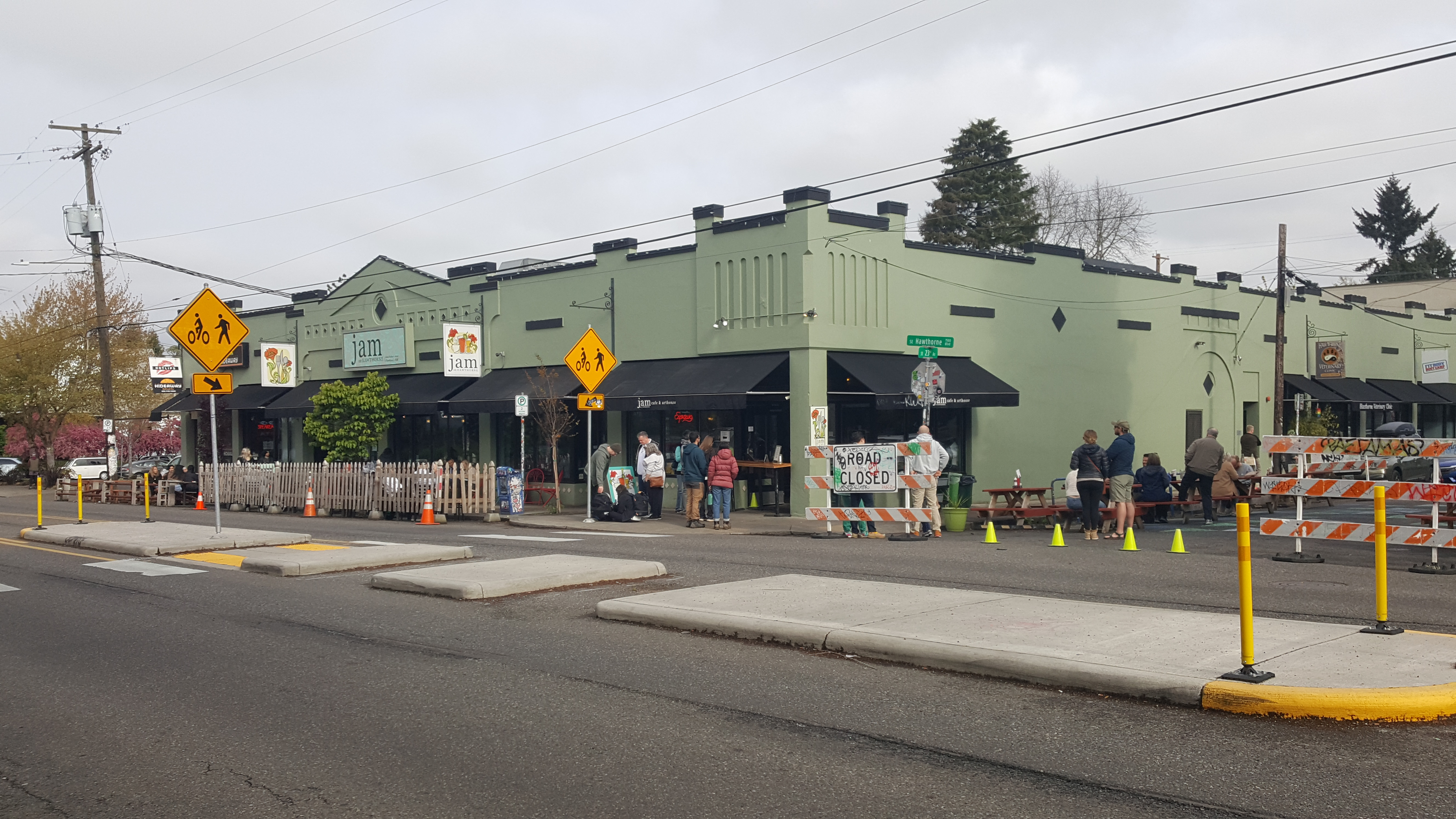
Jam on Hawthorne

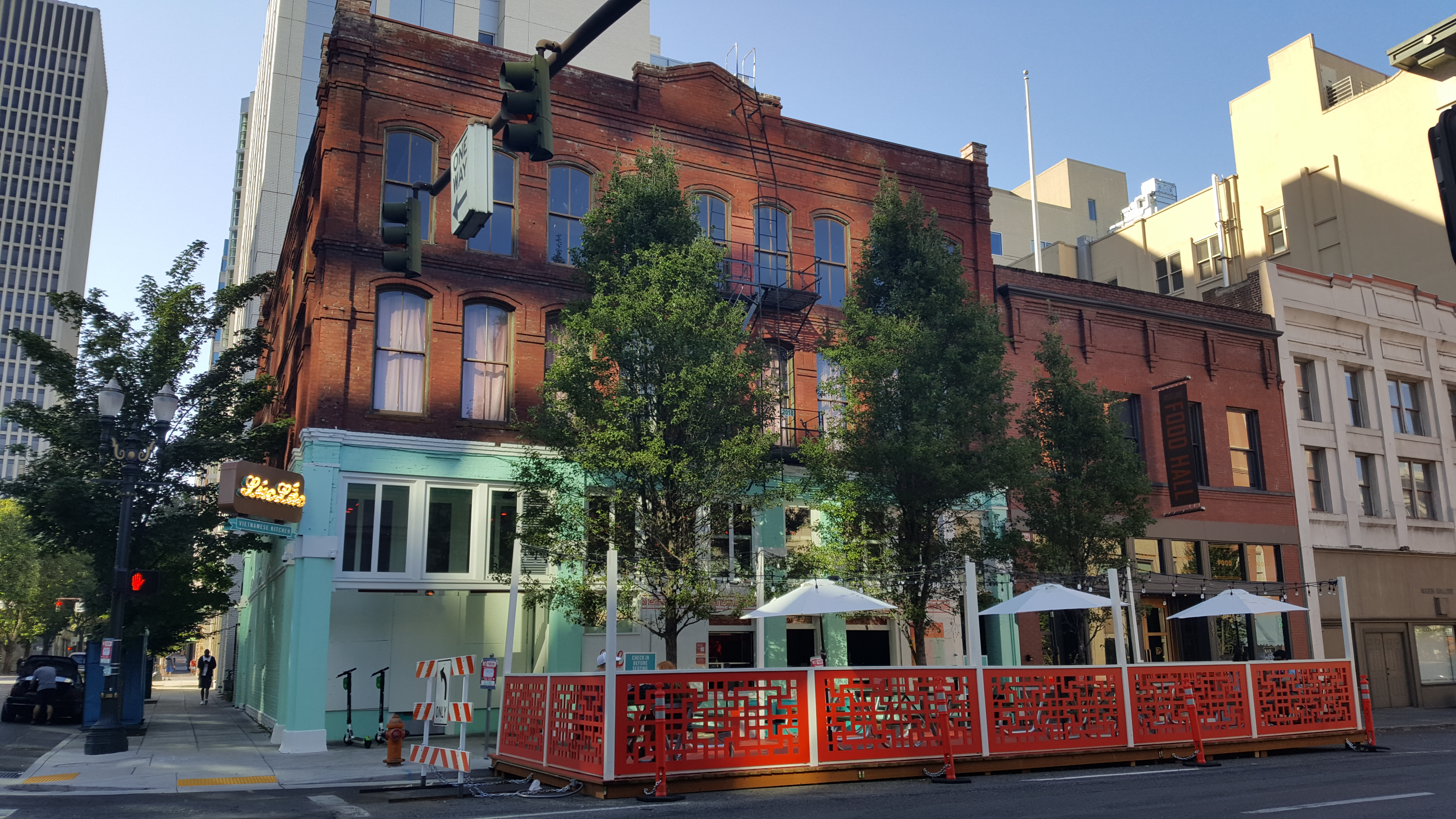
Lúc Lắc Vietnamese Kitchen (2020)

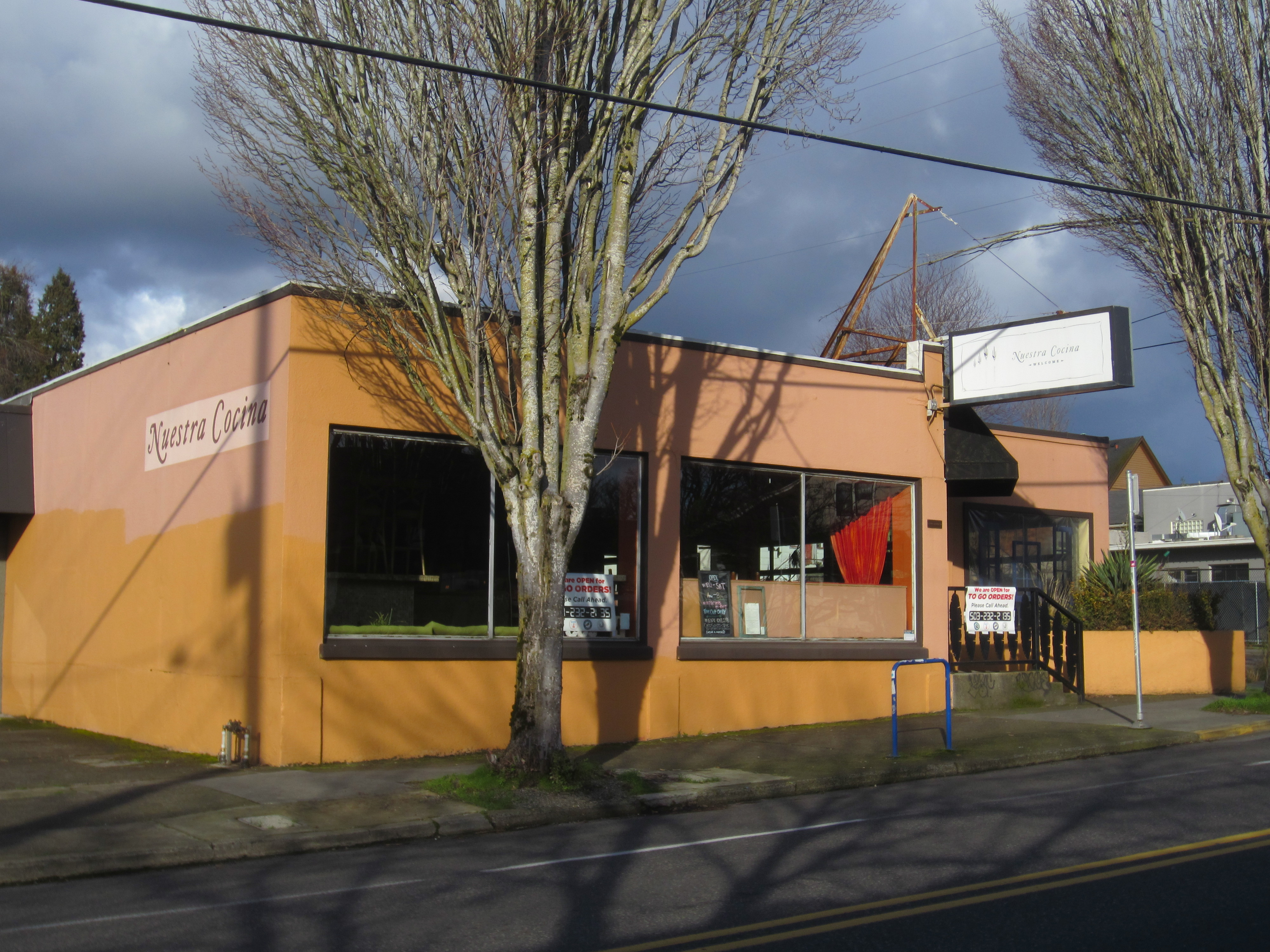
Nuestra Cocina, 2021

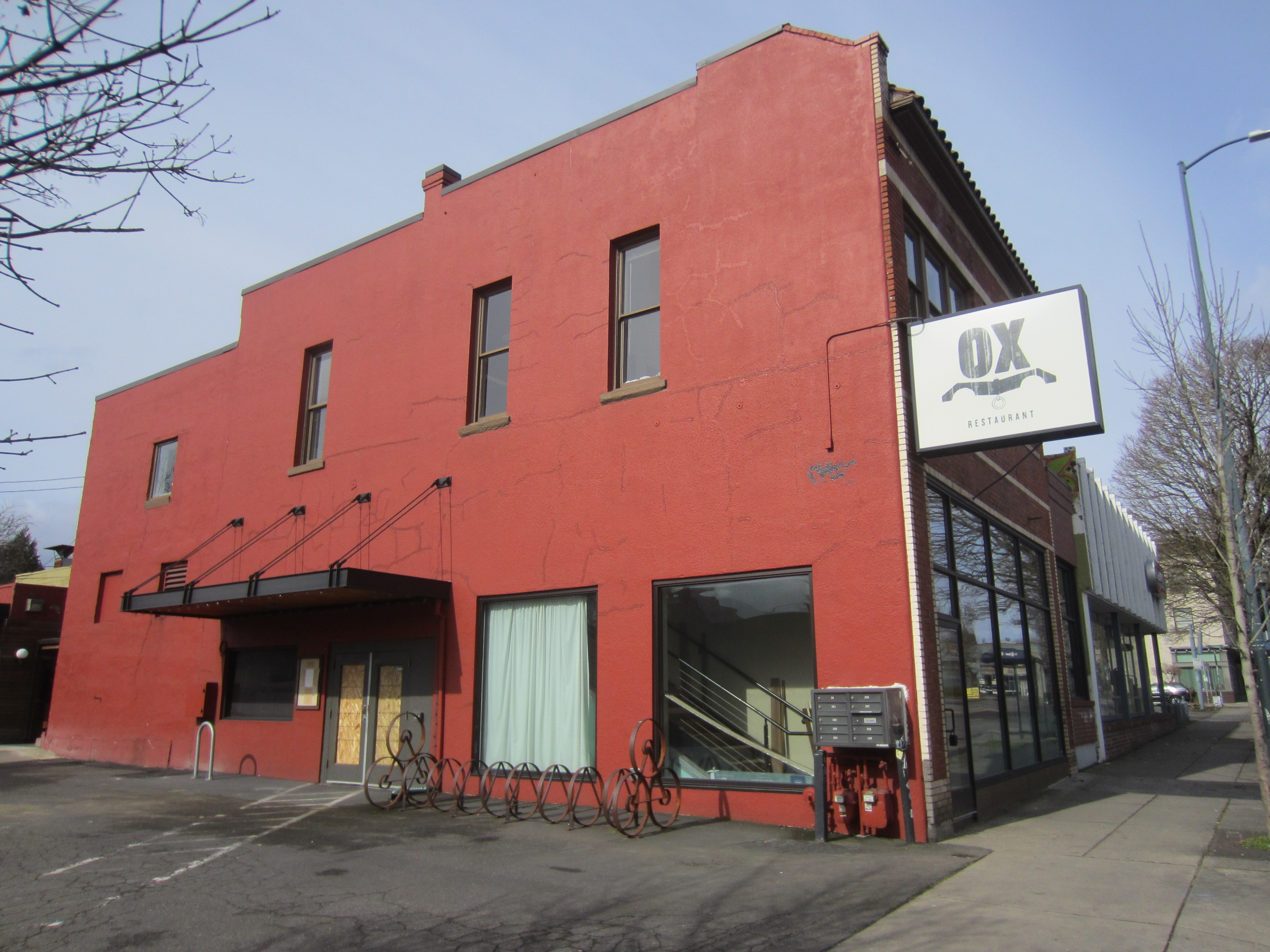
Ox

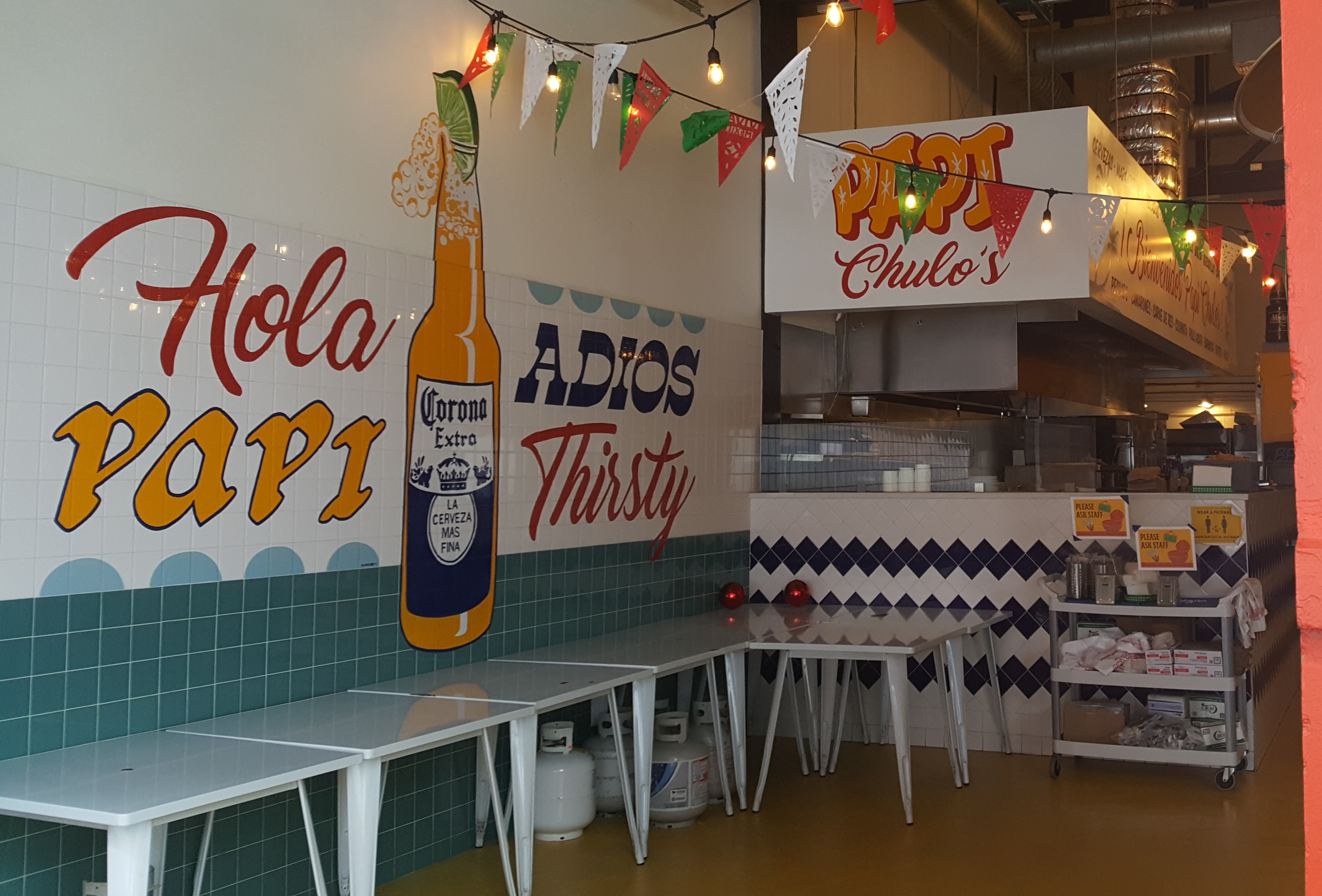
Papi Chulo's

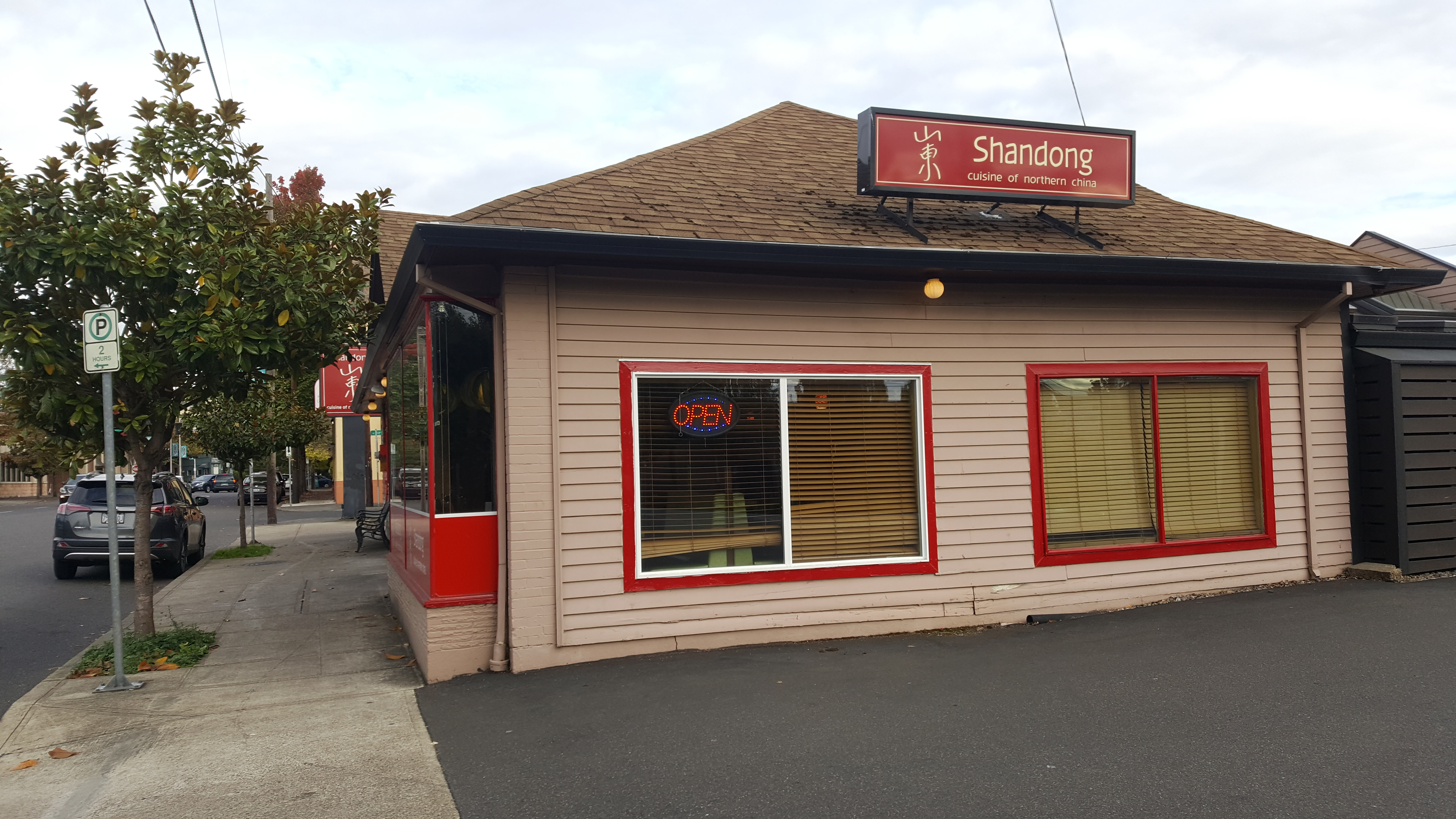
Shandong

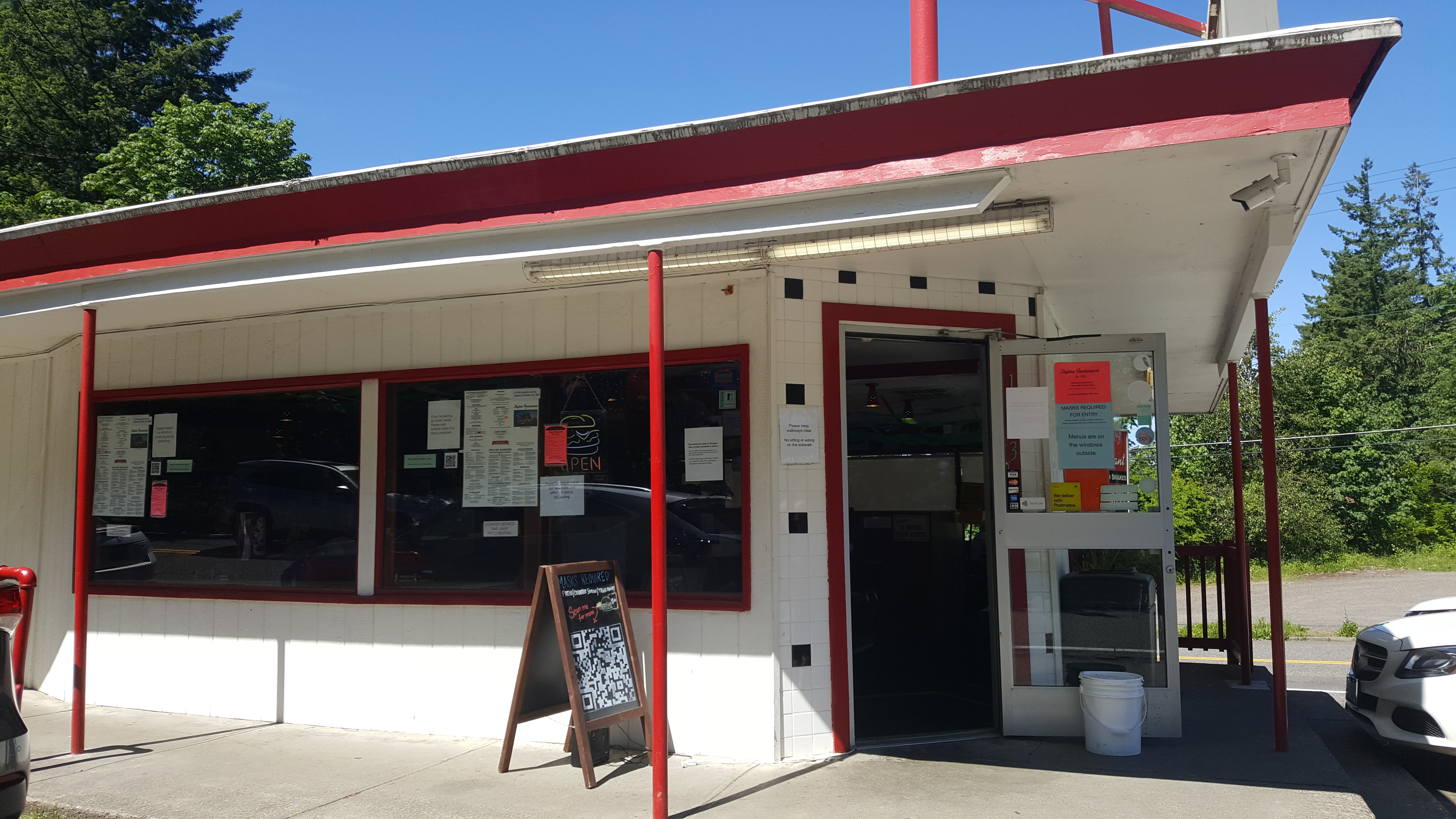
Skyline Restaurant, 2021

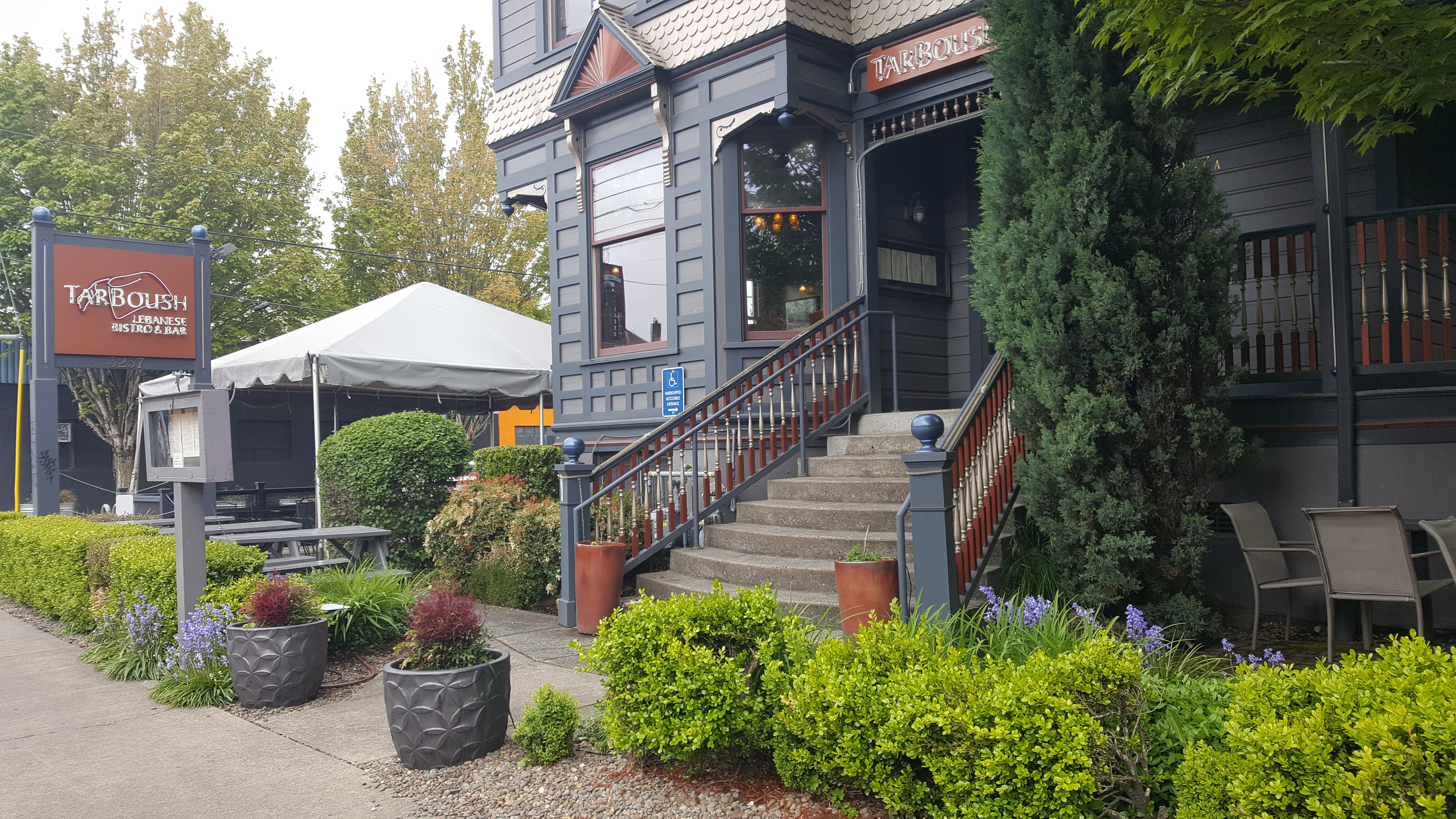
TarBoush

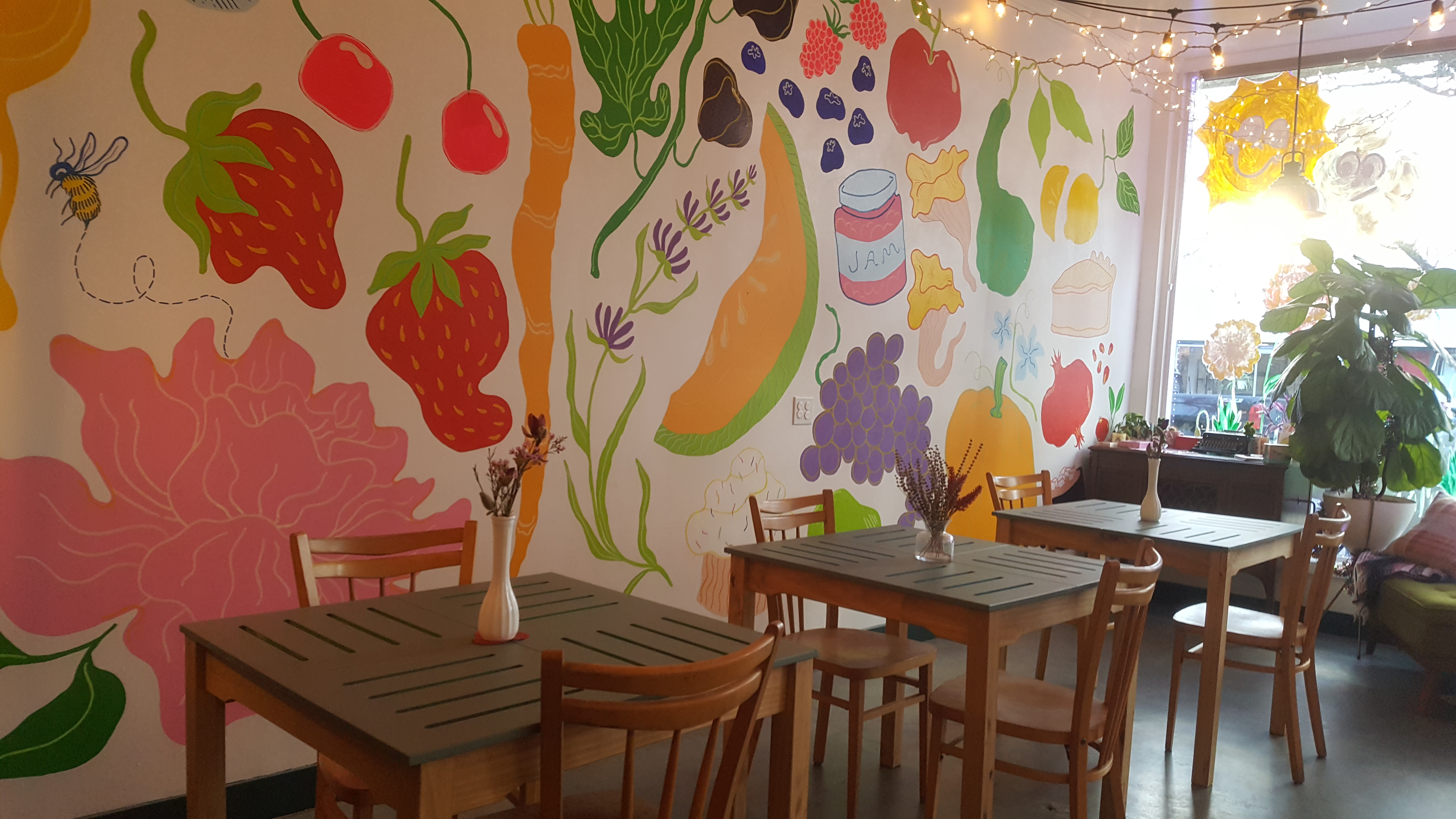
Zuckercreme

- Abigail Hall (2018)
- Abyssinian Kitchen
- Acropolis Steakhouse (1976)
- Akadi
- Alberta Market
- Alberta Street Pub
- Albina Press
- Alibi
- Alma
- Amalfi's Italian Restaurant (1959)
- Ambassador Restaurant and Lounge
- Andina
- Angel Face
- Annam VL
- Annie's Donuts
- Apizza Scholls
- Arden Wine Bar and Kitchen
- Astera
- Astral
- Ate-Oh-Ate
- Atlas Pizza (2014)
- Ava Gene's
- Baby Doll Pizza (2012)
- Back Stage Bar
- Baes Fried Chicken (2019)
- Bake on the Run (2018)
- The Baker's Mark
- Bakeshop
- Balong
- Bar Cala (2022)
- Barista (2009)
- Bark City BBQ
- Bauman's on Oak (2024)
- Bear Paw Inn
- Behind the Museum Café
- Bella's Italian Bakery (2018)
- Bellwether Bar
- Belmont Station
- Ben & Esther's Vegan Jewish Deli (2019)
- Berlu (2019)
- Bernstein's Bagels (2016)
- Bertie Lou's Cafe
- Besaw's
- Bless Your Heart Burgers
- Bluefin Tuna and Sushi
- Bhuna
- Bible Club
- Bing Mi
- Bipartisan Cafe
- Birrieria La Plaza
- Birrieria PDX (2020)
- Blossoming Lotus
- Bluto's
- Bollywood Theater (2012)
- Botto's BBQ
- Bowery Bagels (2012)
- The Box Social
- Boxcar Pizza
- Bread and Ink Cafe
- Brix Tavern (2011)
- Broder
- Bullard Tavern (2018)
- Bye and Bye
- Cadillac Cafe
- Cafe Nell (2008)
- Cafe Olli
- Caffè Umbria
- Campana
- Canard (2018)
- Carlita's
- Caro Amico (1949)
- Casa Zoraya
- Case Study Coffee Roasters
- Cassidy's Restaurant and Bar (1979)
- Cathedral Coffee
- CC Slaughters
- Cha Cha Cha
- Champagne Poetry Patisserie
- Cheerful Bullpen
- Cheese & Crack Snack Shop
- Cheryl's on 12th (2012)
- Chicken and Guns
- Chin's Kitchen (1949)
- Cibo (2012)
- Clarklewis
- Cloud City Ice Cream (2011)
- Clyde's Prime Rib
- Coco Donuts
- Coffee Beer
- Coffee Time (1994)
- Coffin Club (2011)
- Coopers Hall Winery and Taproom (2014)
- Coquine
- Cornet Custard (2024)
- The Country Cat
- Creepy's
- Creo Chocolate
- Cricket Cafe
- Culmination Brewing
- Dan and Louis Oyster Bar
- Darcelle XV Showplace
- DarSalam (2012)
- Davenport (2013)
- DC Vegetarian
- Deadstock Coffee
- Delicious Donuts
- Delta Cafe (1995)
- DeNicola's
- Departure Restaurant and Lounge
- Devil's Dill Sandwich Shop
- Devils Point
- Dick's Primal Burger
- Dimo's Apizza (2020)
- Dirty Lettuce (2020)
- Dixie Tavern (2005)
- Dockside Saloon and Restaurant
- Doe Donuts
- Dolly Olive
- Donnie Vegas (2015)
- Dos Hermanos Bakery
- Double Dragon (2011)
- Double Mountain Brewery (2016)
- Doug Fir Lounge (2004)
- Dough Zone
- Dove Vivi
- Driftwood Room
- Du's Grill (1995)
- Duck House Chinese Restaurant (2016)
- East Glisan Pizza Lounge
- East India Co. Grill and Bar (2007)
- East Side Deli
- Eat: An Oyster Bar
- Eb & Bean
- Edelweiss Sausage & Delicatessen
- Eem
- Either/Or
- El Cubo de Cuba
- El Nutri Taco
- Erica's Soul Food (2020)
- Escape from New York Pizza (1983)
- Excellent Cuisine (2020)
- Face Plant
- Farina Bakery (2014)
- Farmer and the Beast
- Fat Cupcake
- Feral
- The Fields Bar and Grill (2014)
- Fire on the Mountain
- Fifty Licks
- Fish Sauce (2012)
- Flying Fish Company
- Frank's Noodle House
- Franks-A-Lot
- The Fresh Pot
- Fried Egg I'm in Love (2012)
- Friendship Kitchen
- Frybaby
- Fuller's Coffee Shop (1947)
- G-Love (2019)
- Gabbiano's
- Gado Gado (2019)
- Genie's Cafe
- Gilda's Italian Restaurant (2010)
- Gino's Restaurant and Bar (1996)
- Gol
- Good Coffee
- Goose Hollow Inn (1967)
- Grana Pizza Napoletana
- Grassa (2013)
- Gravy (2004)
- The Grilled Cheese Grill (2009)
- Grits n' Gravy
- Güero (2017)
- Gumba
- Ha VL (2004)
- Habibi Restaurant
- Hale Pele
- Han Oak
- Hanoi Kitchen
- Hapa PDX (2013)
- Happy Dragon Chinese Restaurant
- Harlow
- Hat Yai
- Heart Coffee Roasters
- Heavenly Creatures
- Helen Bernhard Bakery (1924)
- Henry Higgins Boiled Bagels
- Heretic Coffee Co.
- Hey Love
- HeyDay
- Higgins Restaurant and Bar (1994)
- HK Cafe
- Hoda's (1999)
- Holman's Bar and Grill (1933)
- Holy Ghost (2021)
- Hopworks Urban Brewery (2007)
- Horse Brass Pub (1976)
- Huber's
- Ice Queen (2018)
- Imperial Bottle Shop & Taproom (2013)
- Jacqueline (2016)
- Jade Rabbit
- Jake's Famous Crawfish
- Jake's Grill (1994)
- Jam on Hawthorne
- Janken
- Javelina
- Jeju (2023)
- Jet Black Coffee Company
- Jim & Patty's Coffee
- JinJu Patisserie (2019)
- Joe Brown's Carmel Corn (1932)
- Joe's Cellar (1941)
- John's Marketplace
- Jojo (2018)
- Kachka
- Kann
- Kate's Ice Cream (2019)
- Kau Kau
- Kay's Bar (1934)
- Kee's Loaded Kitchen
- Keeper Coffee
- Kells Irish Pub
- Kelly's Olympian
- Ken's Artisan Bakery (2001)
- Ken's Artisan Pizza (2006)
- Kennedy School
- Kenny's Noodle House (2008)
- Khao Moo Dang
- Ki'ikibáa
- Kim Jong Grillin'
- Kinnamōns
- Kinboshi Ramen
- Koi Fusion
- Kulfi (2021)
- L'Échelle
- L'Orange
- La Bonita
- La Provence and Petite Provence
- Langbaan
- Lardo
- Laurelhurst Market (2009)
- Laurelwood Pub and Brewery
- Lauretta Jean's
- Le Bistro Montage Ala Cart (2020)
- Le Pigeon (2006)
- Leaky Roof Gastropub
- Lechon (2015)
- Lil' Barbecue
- Lilia Comedor
- Little Griddle (2017)
- Little T American Baker
- LoRell's Chicken Shack
- Los Gorditos (2006)
- Love Shack
- Lovejoy Bakers (2009)
- Lovely's Fifty Fifty
- Low Brow Lounge (1998)
- Loyal Legion
- Lúc Lắc Vietnamese Kitchen (2011)
- Luce (2011)
- Lucky Labrador Brewing Company
- Lutz Tavern (1947–2010; 2011–present)
- Mad Greek Deli (1977)
- Magna Kusina (2019)
- The Malarkey
- Mama Chow's Kitchen (2014)
- Mama Mia Trattoria (2004)
- Maruti Indian Restaurant
- Master Kong (2018)
- Matt's BBQ (2015)
- Matt's BBQ Tacos (2019)
- Matta (2018)
- Maurice (2013)
- Mediterranean Exploration Company
- Mei Sum Bakery
- Memento Mori Cafe
- Mémoire Cà Phê
- Mendelssohns
- Mestizo
- MidCity SmashedBurger
- Mikiko Mochi Donuts
- Mirisata
- Mis Tacones
- Mole Mole
- Monster Smash
- Montelupo Italian Market (2020)
- Moonstruck Chocolate
- Morchella
- Mother's Bistro (2000)
- Mucca Osteria (2011)
- Multnomah Whiskey Library
- Murata
- My Father's Place (1978)
- Nacheaux (2020)
- Navarre
- Never Coffee
- New Cascadia Traditional (2007)
- Nicholas Restaurant
- Nick's Famous Coney Island (1935)
- Nico's Ice Cream (2021)
- Nimblefish (2017)
- Nite Hawk Cafe and Lounge
- No Saint
- Noble Rot
- Nodoguro
- Nong's Khao Man Gai
- Norah
- Normandie
- Nossa Familia Coffee (2004)
- Nostrana (2005)
- Nudi Noodle Place
- Nuestra Cocina
- Nuvrei
- Oaks Bottom Public House (2006)
- Obon Shokudo
- Off the Griddle (2010)
- OK Chicken and Khao Soi
- OK Omens (2018)
- Old Town Pizza (1974)
- Olive or Twist
- Olympia Provisions
- Oma's Hideaway (2020)
- Orange & Blossom
- Original Hotcake House
- The Original Pancake House
- Otto's Sausage Kitchen
- Oven and Shaker
- Ox (2012)
- PaaDee (2011)
- Pal's Shanty Tavern
- Paladin Pie (2020)
- Palomar
- Pambiche Cocina and Repostería Cubana
- Pan Con Queso
- Papa Haydn (1978)
- The Paper Bridge
- Papi Chulo's (2019)
- Pasar
- PDX Sliders (2014)
- The People's Pig
- Petunia's Pies & Pastries
- Philadelphia's Steaks and Hoagies (1987)
- Phở Hùng
- Pho Oregon (2003)
- Phở Kim (2013)
- Pho Van (1992)
- Phuket Cafe
- Piattino (2013)
- Piazza Italia
- The Picnic House (2012)
- Pinolo Gelato (2015)
- Pip's Original Doughnuts & Chai
- Pipsqueak Bagels
- Pix Pâtisserie (2001)
- Pizza Jerk (2015)
- Pizza Thief (2021)
- Pizzeria Otto
- Podnah's Pit Barbecue
- Por Que No (2004)
- Portland Cà Phê
- Portland City Grill (2002)
- Portland Coffee Roasters
- Portland Fish Market (2014)
- Prince Coffee (2016)
- Produce Row Café (1974–2014; 2015–present)
- Prost
- Proud Mary Coffee
- Push x Pull
- Q Restaurant and Bar (2016)
- Queen Mama's Kitchen (2020)
- Queen of Sheba (1990s)
- Radio Room (2008)
- Ramen Ryoma
- Ranch Pizza
- Rangoon Bistro
- Raven's Manor (2021)
- Red Sauce Pizza (2015)
- Redwood
- Reel M Inn
- Reo's Ribs
- Republic Cafe and Ming Lounge (1922)
- República
- Reverend's BBQ
- Rialto
- Rimsky-Korsakoffee House (1980)
- RingSide Steakhouse
- River Pig Saloon (2014)
- Rontoms
- Rose City Book Pub (2018)
- Rose City Coffee Co.
- Rose VL Deli (2015)
- Roseline Coffee
- Round Two (formerly Hit the Spot)
- Rowan (2020)
- Rukdiew Cafe
- Rum Club (2011)
- Ruthie's (2020)
- Saburo's
- Saint Cupcake
- Salsas Locas
- Salty's
- Salvador Molly's
- Sammich
- Sayler's Old Country Kitchen
- Scotch Lodge
- Scottie's Pizza Parlor
- Screen Door
- Seasons and Regions Seafood Grill
- Sebastiano's (2020)
- Serratto
- Sesame Donuts
- Shalom Y'all (2016)
- Shandong
- Shanghai Tunnel Bar
- Shanghai's Best (2018)
- Ship Ahoy Tavern
- Silver Dollar Pizza
- Skyline Restaurant
- Slow Bar
- Smaaken Waffle Sandwiches
- Smart Donkey
- Someday (2020)
- Sousòl
- Southpark Seafood
- Space Room Lounge and Genie's Too
- Spare Room Restaurant and Lounge (1977)
- Spella Caffè
- Spielman Bagels & Coffee (2011)
- Spirit of 77
- The Sports Bra (2022)
- St. Honoré Boulangerie
- St. Jack (2010)
- Stammtisch (2014)
- Steeplejack Brewing Company
- Stoopid Burger (2014)
- StormBreaker Brewing (2014)
- Street Disco
- Stretch the Noodle
- Suki's
- Sun Rice
- Sure Shot Burger
- Sushi Ichiban
- Swagat
- Swank and Swine (2014)
- Sweedeedee (2012)
- Sweetpea Baking Company
- Swiss Hibiscus
- Tabor Bread
- Takibi
- Tamale Boy
- Tanaka
- Taqueria Los Puñales (2020)
- TarBoush (2010)
- Taste Tickler
- Tasty Corner Chinese Restaurant
- Teardrop Lounge
- Thai Peacock
- Thơm Portland (2021)
- Tierra del Sol (2015)
- Tight Tacos
- Tin Shed Garden Cafe
- Tito's Taquitos (2021)
- Toast (2007)
- Tokyo Sando (2020)
- Tom's Restaurant and Bar (1975)
- Too Soon
- Top Burmese
- Tope
- Tōv Coffee
- Tulip Shop Tavern
- Turning Peel
- Tusk
- Twisted Croissant
- Two Wrongs (2019)
- Urban Farmer
- Victoria Bar
- Viking Soul Food (2010)
- Virginia Cafe (1914)
- Virtuous Pie
- Von Ebert Brewing
- Wailua Shave Ice
- Wajan
- Water Avenue Coffee (2009)
- Wayfinder Beer (2016)
- Wei Wei (2015)
- White Owl Social Club (2013)
- The Whole Bowl (2001)
- Wonderwood Springs (2022)
- Woodblock Chocolate
- Xiao Ye (2023)
- Ya Hala
- Yamhill Pub
- Yaowarat
- Yoko's Japanese Restaurant and Sushi Bar
- Yoshi's Sushi
- Zach's Shack (2004)
- Zilla Sake
- Zoiglhaus Brewing Company
- Zuckercreme (2021)

== Restaurant chains based in Portland ==
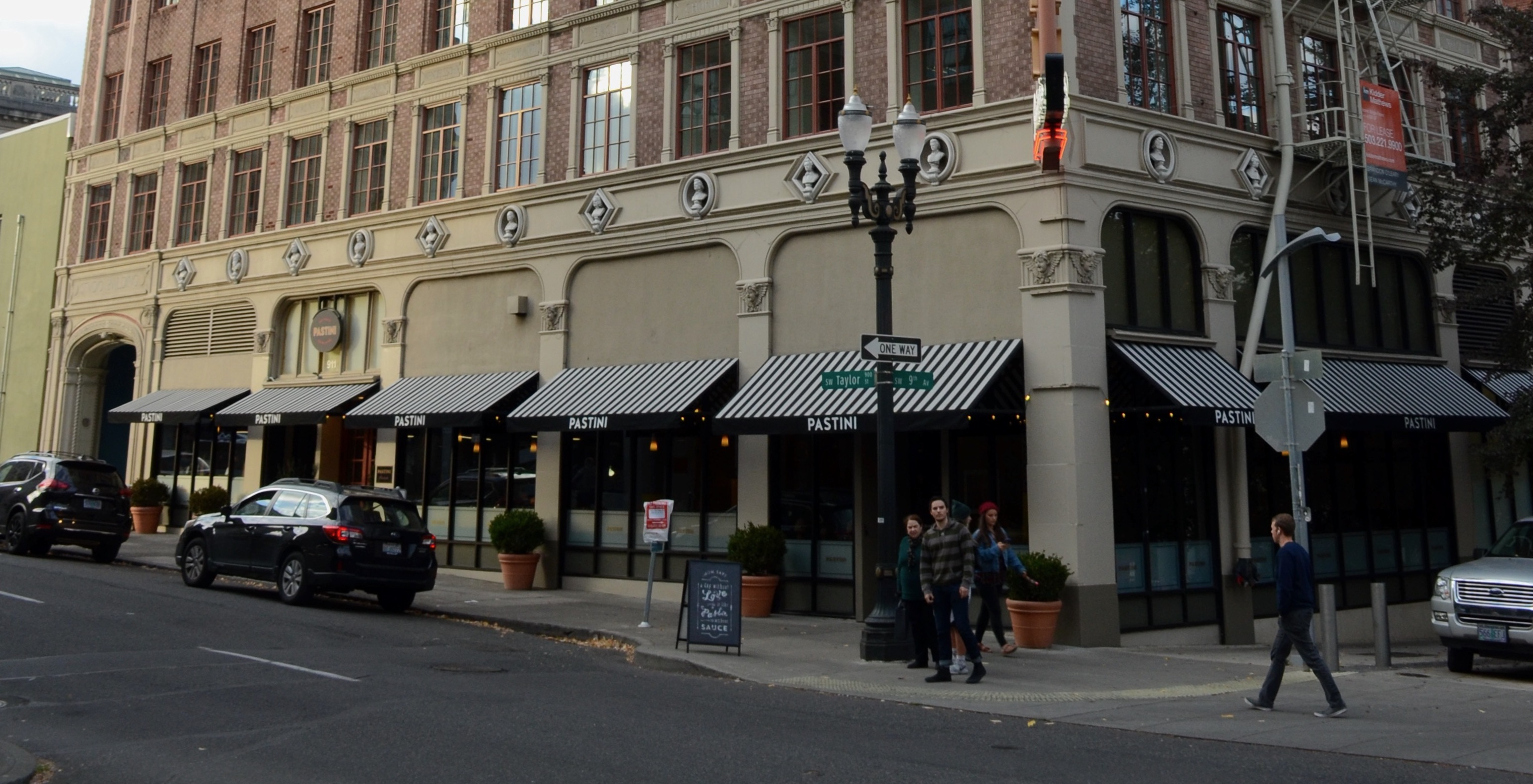
Pastini in downtown's Studio Building

- Bamboo Sushi
- Blue Star Donuts
- Boxer Ramen (2013)
- Bunk Sandwiches
- E-san Thai Cuisine
- Elephants Delicatessen
- Grand Central Bakery
- Hot Lips Pizza
- Little Big Burger (2010)
- McCormick & Schmick's
- Mio Sushi
- The Old Spaghetti Factory
- Olympia Provisions
- Pastini
- Pine State Biscuits (2006)
- Salt & Straw (2011)
- Sizzle Pie
- Slappy Cakes
- SuperDeluxe (2018)

== Food cart pods ==
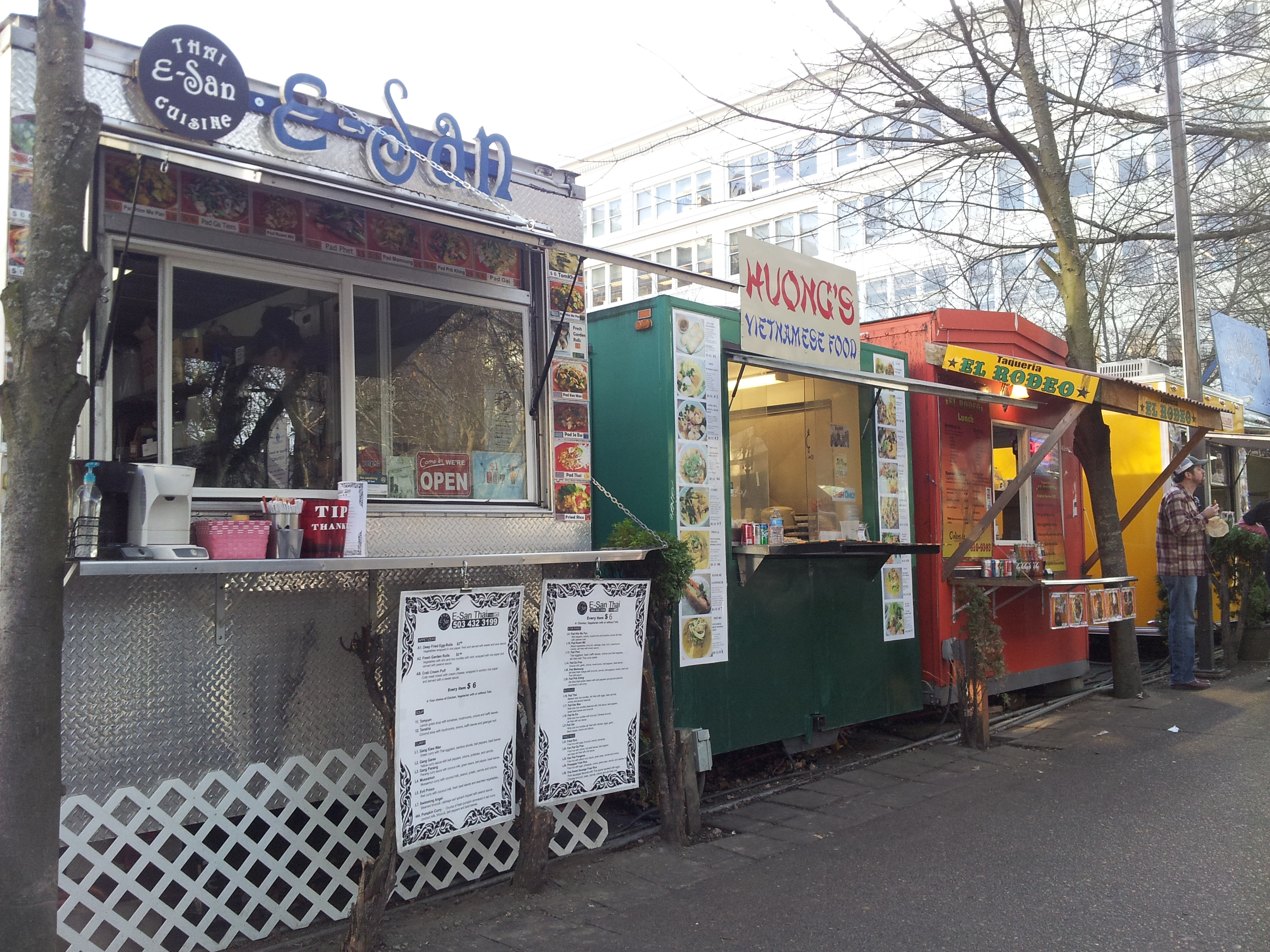
Alder Street food cart pod, 2013

- Alder Street food cart pod
- Cart Blocks (2021)
- Cartopia
- Carts on Foster
- Collective Oregon Eateries (2021)
- Hawthorne Asylum (2019)
- The Heist
- Hinterland Bar and Food Carts
- Midtown Beer Garden
- Nob Hill Food Carts (2019)
- Pan y Pueblo
- Pod 28
- Portland Mercado (2015)
- Prost Marketplace
- Rose City Food Park
- Springwater Cart Park (2011)
- Third Avenue Food Cart Pod

== See also ==
- Cooperativa (Portland, Oregon) (2020–2022)
- Culture of Portland, Oregon
- James Beard Public Market
- Pine Street Market
- Typhoon (restaurant), based in Tigard, multiple locations in the Portland metropolitan area
- Pacific Northwest cuisine
