= Besaw's =

Restaurant in Portland, Oregon, U.S.

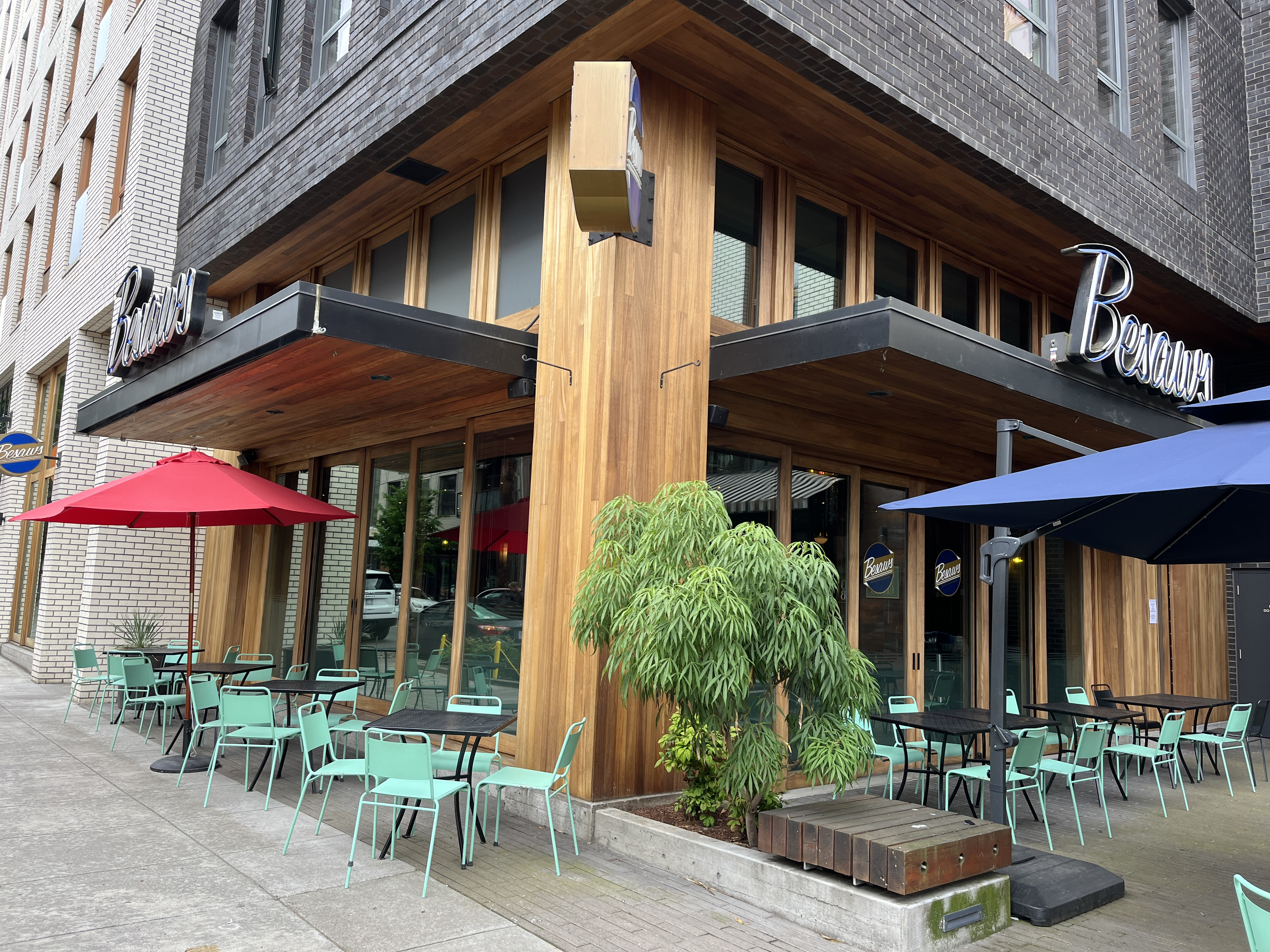
- The restaurant's exterior in 2024
- Interactive map of Besaw's

Restaurant information
- Location: Portland, Oregon, United States
- Coordinates: 45.5339°N 122.6950°W

Besaw's is restaurant serving American cuisine in Portland, Oregon's Northwest District, in the United States.

== History ==
The restaurant closed in May 2015, following a trademark disagreement and lease dispute. Besaw's reopened at NW 23rd and Savier in January 2016.

Cana Flug owns Besaw's. The restaurant closed temporarily in 2020, during the COVID-19 pandemic.

== Reception ==
In 2019, Alex France included Besaw's in Eater Portland's list of "16 Quintessential Restaurants and Bars in Slabtown". Michael Russell included the restaurant in The Oregonian's 2023 list of Portland's ten best new brunches.
