= Pipsqueak Bagels =

Restaurant in Portland, Oregon, U.S.

- The bagel shop's exterior in April 2026
- Interactive map of Pipsqueak Bagels

Restaurant information
- Owner: Madilyn Gibbons
- Location: 3844 Southeast Gladstone Street, Portland, Multnomah, Oregon, 97202, United States
- Coordinates: 45.4931°N 122.6229°W
- Website: pipsqueakbagels.com

Pipsqueak Bagels is a restaurant in Portland, Oregon, United States. The business was established in 2024 and initially operated at farmers' markets, before moving into a brick and mortar shop in southeast Portland's Creston-Kenilworth neighborhood in 2026.

== Description ==
Pipsqueak Bagels is a bagel shop on Gladstone Street in southeast Portland's Creston-Kenilworth neighborhood. It offers bagels and bagel sandwiches. Bagel varieties have included "everything", jalapeño–cheddar, poppy seed, rosemary–Maldon salt, and sesame. Cacio e pepe has been a seasonal option. Schmear options include everything, scallion, and smoked salmon. The cream cheese is made in-house.

== History ==
Co-owner Madilyn Gibbons started the business in 2024, initially operating as a vendor at the Milwaukie Farmers Market and Sunnyside Farmers Market. As of May 2025, Pipsqueak's bagels were also available at Puff Coffee. The business was a vendor at the third annual Bread Fest in 2025.

In March 2026, news outlets described plans for Pipsqueak to open a brick and mortar location on April 11. Pipsqueak was popular upon opening, prompting the business to increase production to as much as 2,000 bagels per day.

== Reception ==
Upon opening, Pipsqueak was popular and regularly sold out of batches to long lines. Meira Gebel of Axios Portland wrote, "Gibbons said she can go toe-to-toe with New York's best — and we think it lives up to the hype". Zoe Baillargeon of Eater Portland said, "Bagels are having a moment in Portland, and Pipsqueak is one of the bagelries leading the charge." Michael Russell of The Oregonian included the business in a list of twelve new Portland "restaurants to know". Pipsqueak was a finalist in the Best Bagel category of Willamette Week's annual 'Best of Portland' readers' poll in 2026.

== See also ==
- List of bakeries
