= Noble Rot (restaurant) =

Wine bar in Portland, Oregon, U.S.

- Interactive map of Noble Rot

Restaurant information
- Location: 1111 East Burnside Street, Portland, Multnomah, Oregon, 97214, United States
- Coordinates: 45°31′23″N 122°39′15″W

Noble Rot is a restaurant and wine bar in Portland, Oregon, United States. Leather Storrs is a chef and owner.
