= Higgins Restaurant and Bar =

Restaurant in Portland, Oregon, U.S.

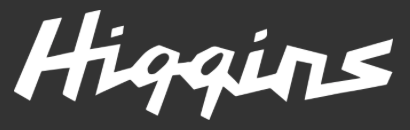

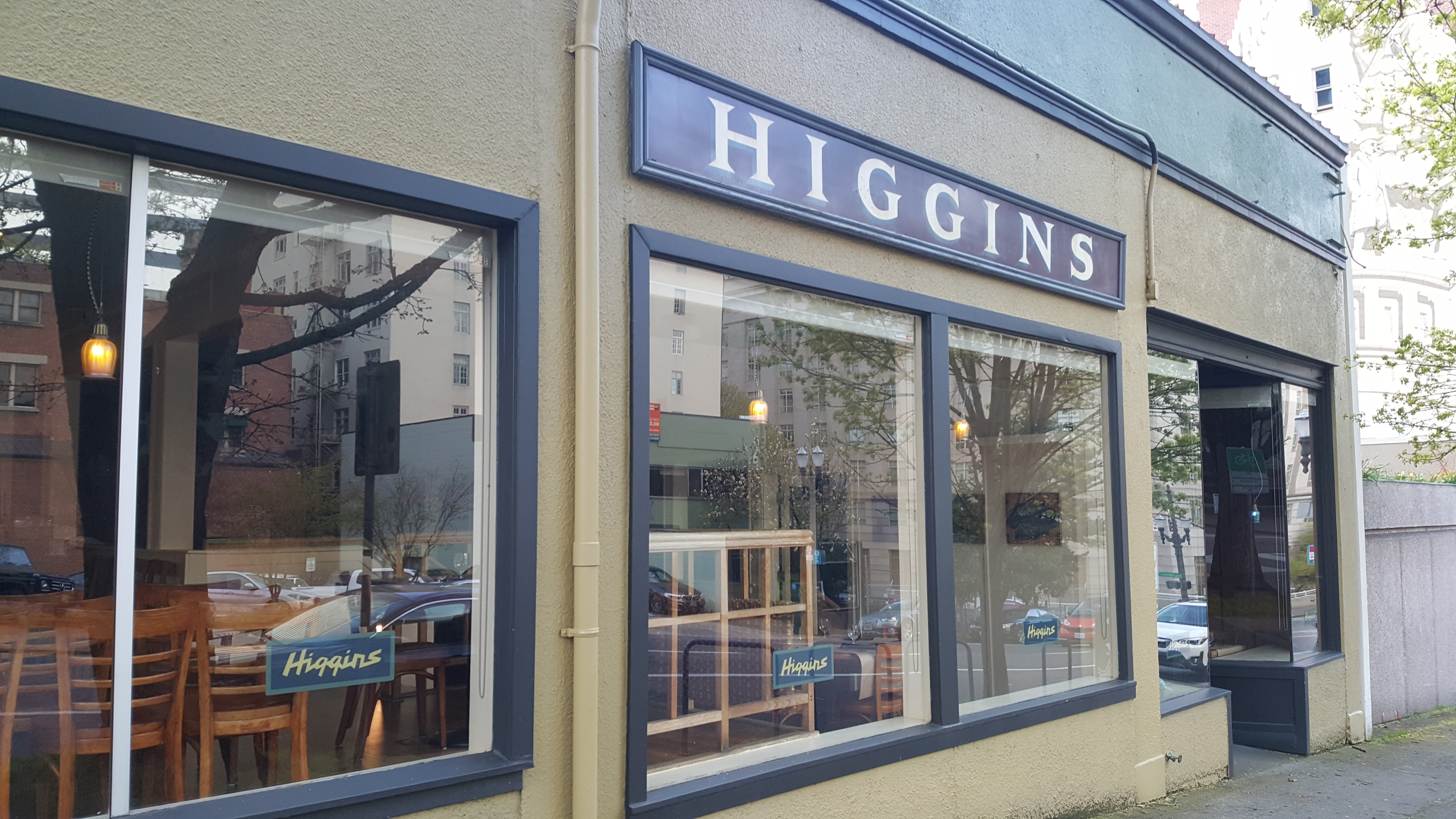
- The restaurant's exterior, 2022
- Interactive map of Higgins Restaurant and Bar

Restaurant information
- Location: 1239 Southwest Broadway, Portland, Multnomah, Oregon, 97205, United States
- Coordinates: 45.51557°N 122.68200°W
- Website: higginsportland.com

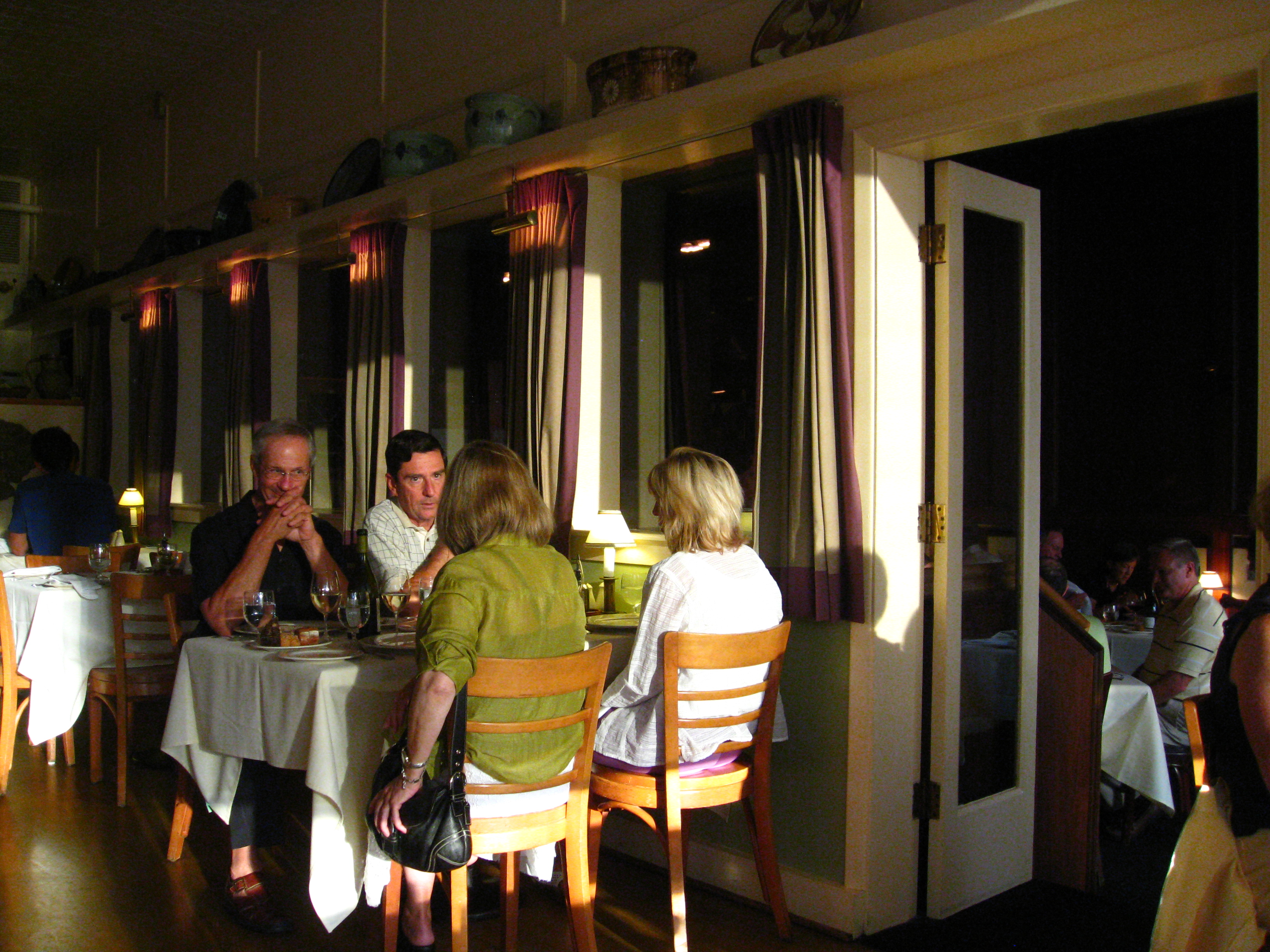
Interior, 2008

Higgins Restaurant and Bar, or simply Higgins, is a restaurant in Portland, Oregon, United States.

== Description and history ==
Nearly one third of its menu was vegetarian when Higgins opened in 1994.

The business participated in Portland Dining Month in 2026.

== Reception ==
The restaurant has been called a "Portland landmark". The business was included in Eater Portland's 2022 overview of recommended restaurants in downtown Portland. Michael Russell ranked Higgins number 19 in The Oregonian's 2025 list of Portland's 40 best restaurants. The business ranked fifth in the best restaurant category of the newspaper's annual Readers Choice Awards in 2025.

Hannah Wallace included the business in Condé Nast Traveler's 2025 list of Portland's 23 best restaurants. The business was included in Portland Monthly's 2025 list of 25 restaurants "that made Portland". Writers for Portland Monthly included the charcuterie in a 2025 list of the city's "most iconic" dishes.

== See also ==
- James Beard Foundation Award: 2000s
