= Bauman's on Oak =

Taproom in Portland, Oregon, U.S.

- Interactive map of Bauman's on Oak

Restaurant information
- Location: 930 Southeast Oak Street, Portland, Multnomah, Oregon, United States
- Coordinates: 45°31′12″N 122°39′23″W

Bauman's on Oak is a taproom in Portland, Oregon, United States. It is operated by a Gervais-based cidery.

== Description ==
The taproom operates in southeast Portland's Buckman neighborhood. In addition to cider, Bauman's on Oak serves beer and wine. Food options include a crab roll. The taproom has a patio.

== History ==
Bauman's on Oak operates in the space that previously housed Base Camp Brewing. The business was founded by Christine Bauman Walter. The grand opening was held in April 2024. The business participated in Portland Dining Month in 2026.

== Reception ==
Bauman's on Oak won in the Best New Restaurant category of Eater Portland's annual Eater Awards in 2024. Katrina Yentch included the business in Eater Portland's 2025 overview of the best restaurants in Buckman.

Michael Russell included the peach and pancetta pizza in The Oregonian's list of Portland's ten best dishes of 2024. He later included the business in the newspaper's 2025 list of the 21 best restaurants in southeast Portland. Russell ranked the business number 32 in The Oregonian's 2025 list of Portland's 40 best restaurants. He included Bauman's in a 2025 list of Portland's ten best new restaurants.

== See also ==
- Cider in the United States
- List of cideries in the United States
