= Culmination Brewing =

Brewery based in Portland, Oregon, U.S.

Restaurant information
- Location: Portland, Multnomah, Oregon, United States
- Website: culminationbrewing.beer

Culmination Brewing is a brewery based in Portland, Oregon, United States.

== Description ==
Culmination Brewing had a taproom with a dog-friendly patio in the Northeast Portland part of the Kerns neighborhood. The building was formerly a warehouse.

== History ==
Culmination Brewing was established in May 2015.

The business announced plans to close its taproom in Northeast Portland in 2025.

== See also ==
- Brewing in Oregon
