= Cafe Nell =

Restaurant in Portland, Oregon, U.S.

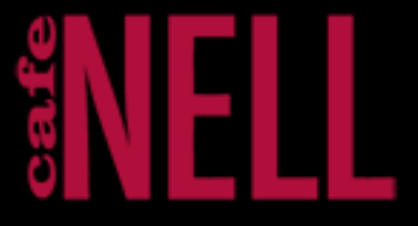
- Interactive map of Cafe Nell

Restaurant information
- Established: September 2008
- Owner: Vanessa Preston
- Chef: Andrew Garrett
- Location: 1987 Northwest Kearney Street, Portland, Multnomah, Oregon, 97209, United States
- Coordinates: 45.529354°N 122.692318°W

Cafe Nell is a restaurant in Portland, Oregon's Northwest District, United States. The restaurant is owned by Vanessa Preston.

== History ==
The restaurant opened in September 2008, occupying a space which previously housed Cafe des Amis from 1982 to 2003, and later Hurley's. Cafe Nell has been referenced multiple times on the television series Grimm, including the episodes "The Hour of Death", "Death Do Us Part", and "Blood Magic". Andrew Garrett has served as chef.

== Reception ==
In his review of the restaurant, David Sarasohn of The Oregonian gave Cafe Nell a 'B' rating.
