= Loyal Legion (restaurant) =

Restaurant chain based in Portland, Oregon, U.S.

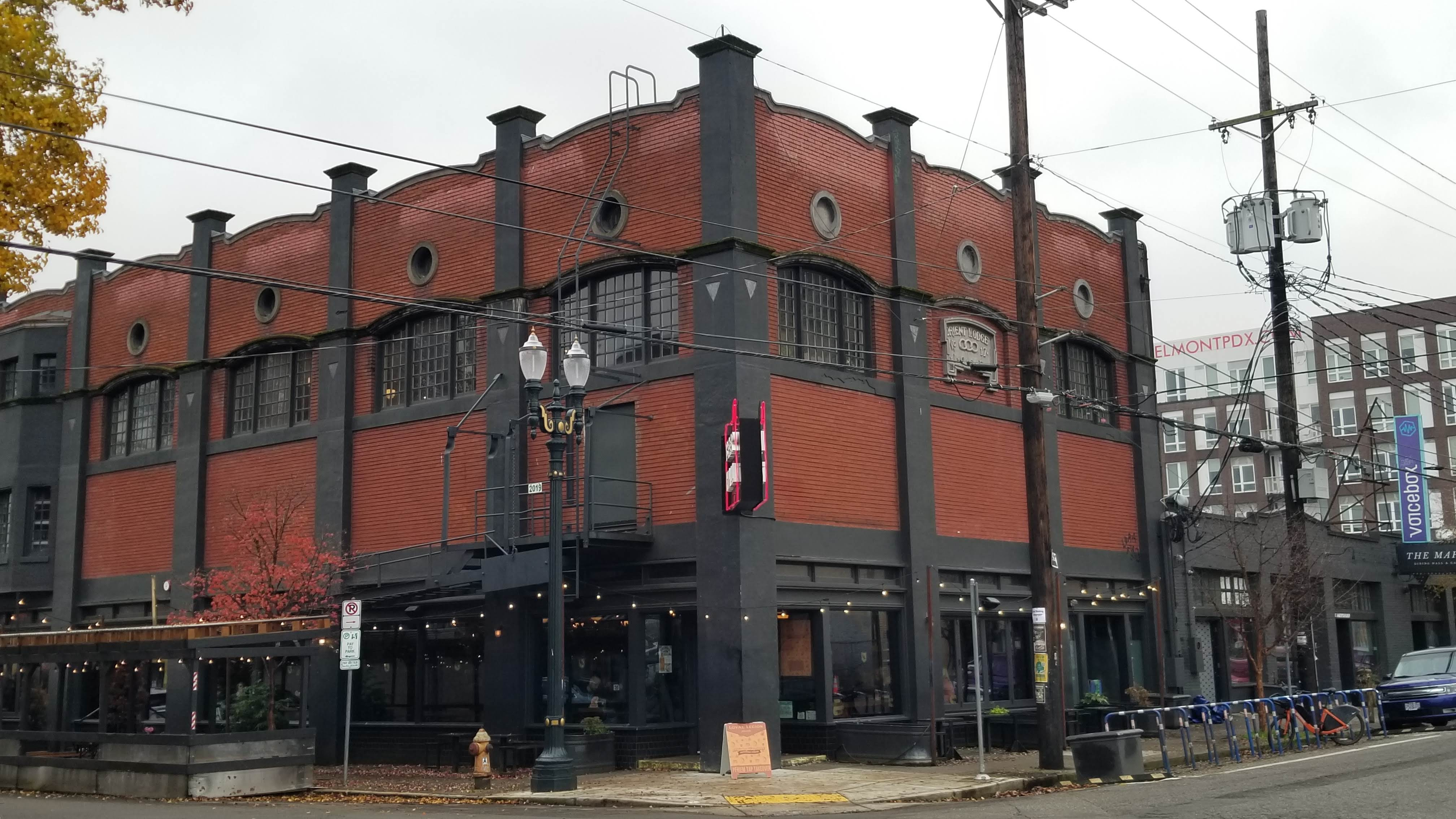
- Exterior of the beer hall in southeast Portland's Buckman neighborhood in 2024

Restaurant information
- Location: United States
- Website: loyallegionbeerhall.com

Loyal Legion is small chain of restaurants based in Portland, Oregon, United States. It is operated by the restaurant group ChefStable.

== History and locations ==
Loyal Legion operates a beer hall in southeast Portland's Buckman neighborhood, and a taproom in Beaverton. The southeast Portland location opened in 2015 and has a seating capacity of approximately 220 people.

Previously, the business also operated in Sacramento.

== Reception ==
Alexander Frane included Loyal Legion in Condé Nast Traveler's 2018 list of Portland's thirteen best bars. The business won in the Best Beer Selection on Tap category of Willamette Week's annual 'Best of Portland' readers' poll in 2025 and 2026.
