= Cadillac Cafe =

Restaurant in Portland, Oregon, U.S.

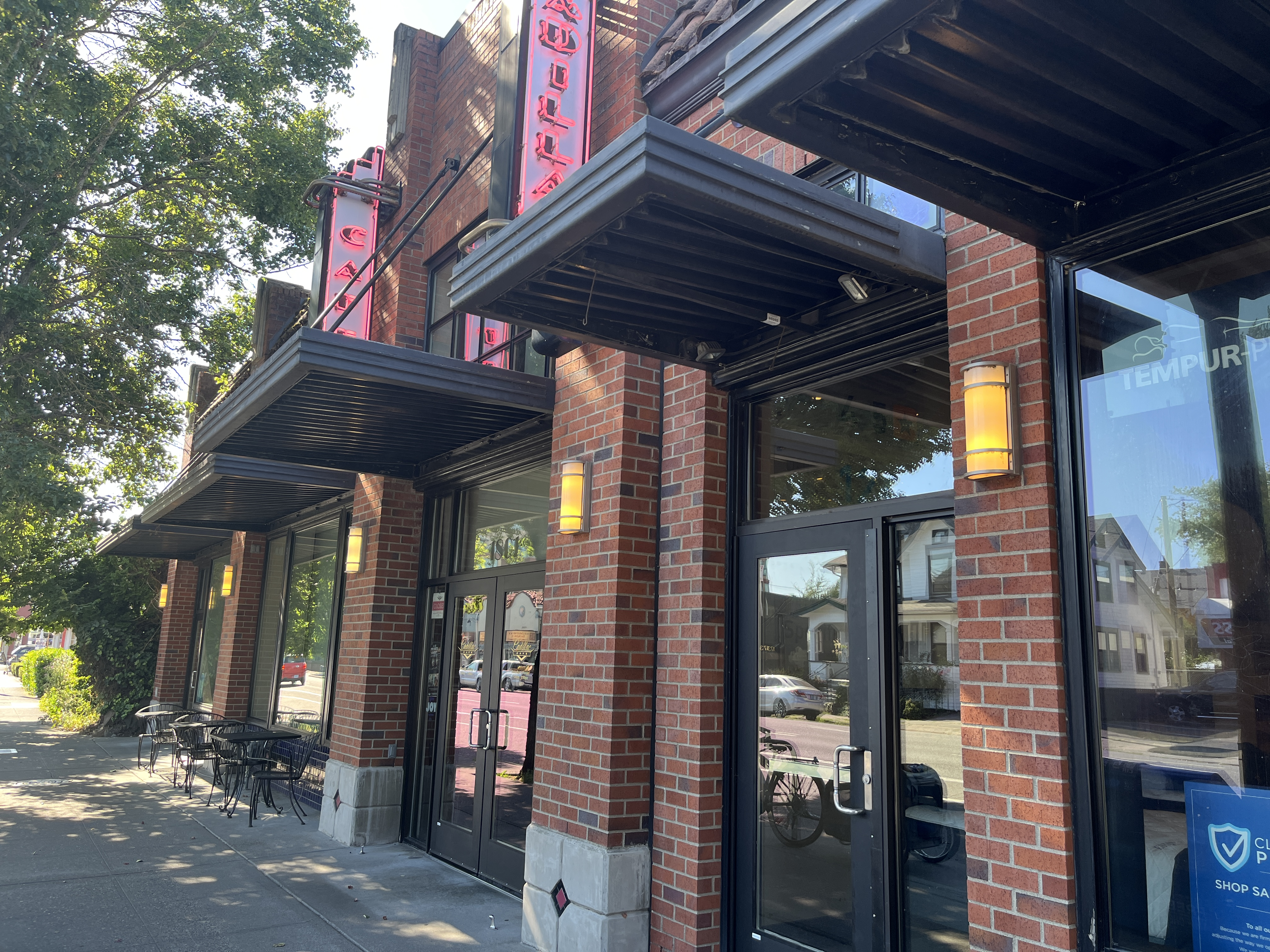
- The restaurant's exterior in 2022
- Interactive map of Cadillac Cafe

Restaurant information
- Location: 1801 NE Broadway, Portland, Multnomah, Oregon, 97232, United States
- Coordinates: 45.5352°N 122.6475°W
- Website: cadillaccafepdx.com

Cadillac Cafe is a restaurant in Portland, Oregon's Irvington neighborhood, in the United States.

== Description ==
Cadillac Cafe is a restaurant along Northeast Broadway in Portland's Irvington neighborhood. A fully functional pink 1961 Cadillac and other vintage car memorabilia are displayed inside. In 2008, Willamette Week said, "With its many tropical plants and a 1962 pink convertible on display, the Cadillac feels like a road trip to Miami, circa 1965."

== History ==
Ownership of the restaurant changed to James Hall and Josh Johnston in 2015. In 2020, Cadillac was forced to close temporarily during the COVID-19 pandemic, but had reopened with expanded outdoor seating by July.

== Reception ==
Morgan Troper of the Portland Mercury called Cadillac an "institution" of the city's Lloyd District.
