= Bible Club =

Cocktail bar and restaurant in Portland, Oregon, U.S.

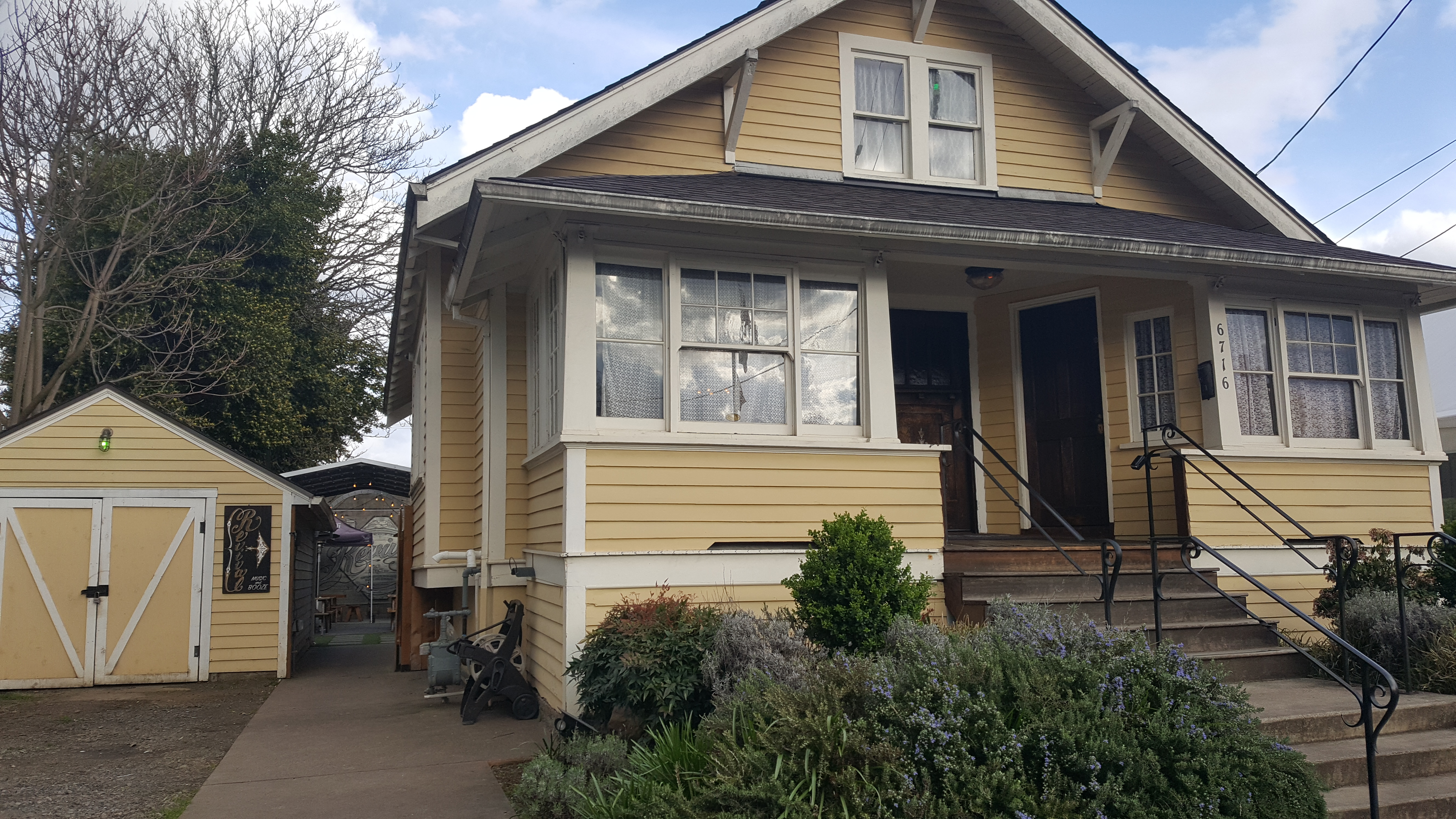
- The bar's exterior, 2022
- Interactive map of Bible Club

Restaurant information
- Established: March 11, 2016
- Location: 6716 Southeast 16th Avenue, Portland, Multnomah, Oregon, 97202, United States
- Coordinates: 45°28′27″N 122°38′59″W

Bible Club PDX, or simply Bible Club, is a bar in Portland, Oregon, United States. Established in March 2016, the business operates in a 1920s house in Southeast Portland's Sellwood-Moreland neighborhood.

== Description ==
The bar Bible Club operates in a 1922 yellow Craftsman house on 16th Avenue, in Southeast Portland's Sellwood-Moreland neighborhood. It has been described as the "museum you can drink in". There is a patio, called Revival, with wooden tables. The New York Times has said Bible Club serves "elevated pub grub and vintage cocktails". Among drinks on the Prohibition-themed menu is the Devils Fork Fix, which has Union Gin, Suze, BC ginger syrup, celery juice, and lemon. The Coffee Cobbler has brandy and cold brew coffee, and the Fernet Champagne Flip has ginger syrup and a whole egg. The Hombre Santo has Maestro Dobel Diamante tequila, Dolin Blanc and Bénédictine. Food options include comfort foods and snacks like charcuterie, baked brie, and meatballs.

== History ==
Bible Club was opened by chef Anthony Cafiero, Brandi Leigh (front of house), and bartenders Jessica Braasch and Nathan Elliot, on March 11, 2016.

== Reception ==
Alexander Frane included Bible Club in Condé Nast Traveler's 2018 list of Portland's thirteen best bars.
