= Teardrop Lounge =

Cocktail bar in Portland, Oregon, U.S.

- Logo

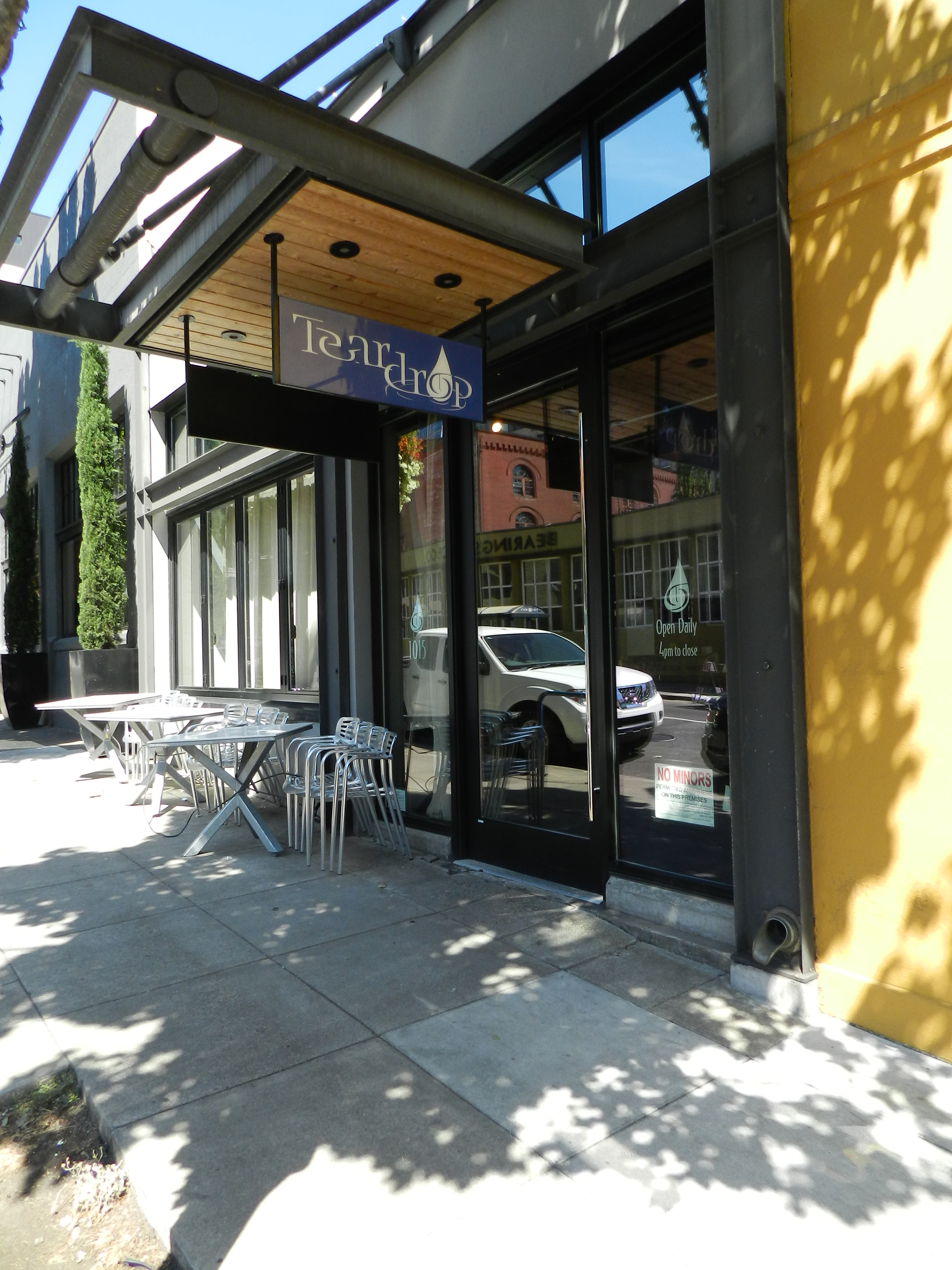
- The bar's entrance

- Location within Portland, Oregon
- Address: Portland, Oregon; United States
- Coordinates: 45.525198°N 122.681660°W

Construction
- Opened: 2007

Teardrop Lounge is a cocktail bar in Portland, Oregon's Pearl District, in the United States. Daniel Shoemaker opened the bar in 2007.

== Description ==
Thrillist contributor Pete Dombrosky called the lounge "quiet and inventive". He wrote, "The impressive drink menu, paired with a number of upped/casual appetizers, are the makings of a great night out. The atmosphere is a mix of night club and chic, so anyone will feel comfortable sipping drinks at one of Portland's first cocktail bars."

== Reception ==
Kara Stokes and Maya MacEvoy included Teardrop in Eater Portland's 2022 overview of "Where to Eat and Drink in Portland’s Pearl District". The website included the business in a similar list in 2025. Alex Frane included the business in Portland Monthly's 2025 list of the city's best bars.
