= Cheerful Bullpen =

Pub in Portland, Oregon, U.S.

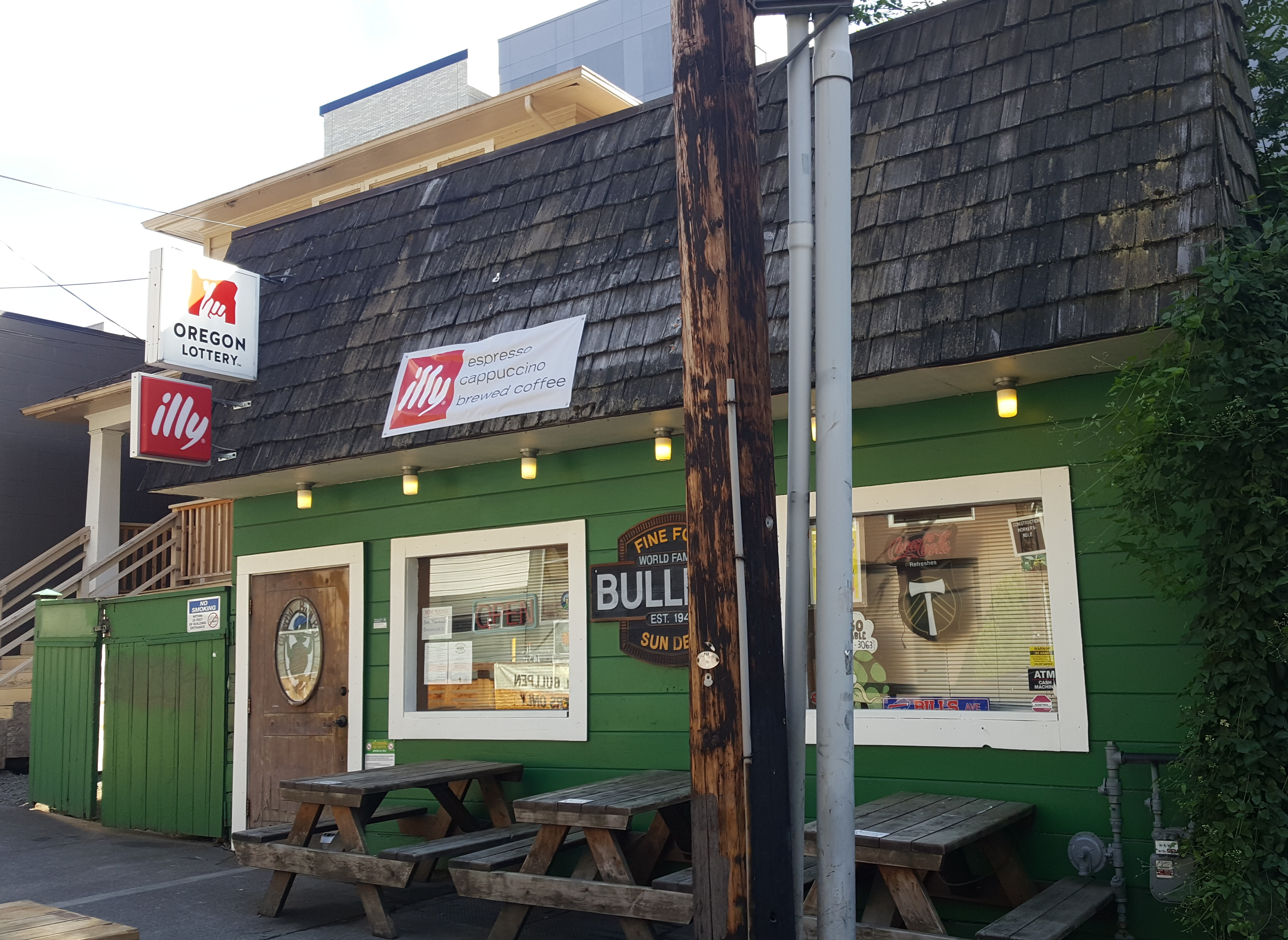
- The pub's exterior in 2021
- Interactive map of Cheerful Bullpen

Restaurant information
- Established: 1948
- Owner: Amy Nichols-Egge (2008–present)
- Location: 1730 Southwest Taylor Street, Portland, Oregon, 97205, United States
- Coordinates: 45.5206°N 122.6905°W

Cheerful Bullpen is a pub in Portland, Oregon, United States. Established in 1948, the restaurant operates in southwest Portland's Goose Hollow neighborhood.

== Description ==
Cheerful Bullpen is a pub in southwest Portland's Goose Hollow neighborhood, across from Providence Park. Thrillist describes Cheerful Bullpen as "a cozy sports bar that's one of the best places in Portland to watch a soccer match", and a "no-frills sports bar and the OG home of the Timbers Army, with a mural outside depicting the city's sports history". The pub has 21 television screens, as of 2011. According to Eater Portland's Erin DeJesus, "the bar embraces NFL all the time, with a recurring Monday Night Football bingo game". Cheerful Bullpen is the home Portland bar for the Buffalo Bills.

== History ==
Cheerful Bullpen opened in 1948.

Amy Nichols-Egge has owned Cheerful Bullpen as well as Cheerful Tortoise since 2008, and has worked at both since 1999. The business has been burglarized multiple times; approximately $8,000 was stolen in 2019.

Like many businesses, Cheerful Bullpen faced challenges upon the arrival of the COVID-19 pandemic. Social distancing limited the pub's seating capacity to 20 people at times.

In 2024, Nichols-Egge withdrew the bar's sponsorship of the Portland Pickles baseball team for hosting drag performers at games.

== Reception ==
In his 2011 review for Willamette Week, Aaron Mesh wrote: "this sports bar's cozy couch nooks become a kind of Goose Hollow rec room for partisans of the San Francisco Giants or the Washington Huskies, depending on the night. The most reliable contingent, however, is the Buffalo Bills Backers, the most Sisyphean of fan bases and therefore also the most lovable. Their loud Sunday-morning revival meetings are fueled by corned-beef hash, coffee and $5 Bloody Marys; the Bullpen has a rather astoundingly wide menu, including all-you-can-eat penne pasta for $6.95 on Saturdays. Like being a Buffalo Bills Backer, the pasta is not very enjoyable, but it is endless."

In 2013, Eater Portland readers voted to include Cheerful Bullpen in a list of ten "best Portland bars for NFL fans". In 2016, The Oregonian included Cheerful Bullpen in a list of the city's best sports bars, and Michael Russell ranked the pub number 17 in his list of Portland nineteen best soccer bars.
