= Cheryl's on 12th =

Restaurant in Portland, Oregon, U.S.

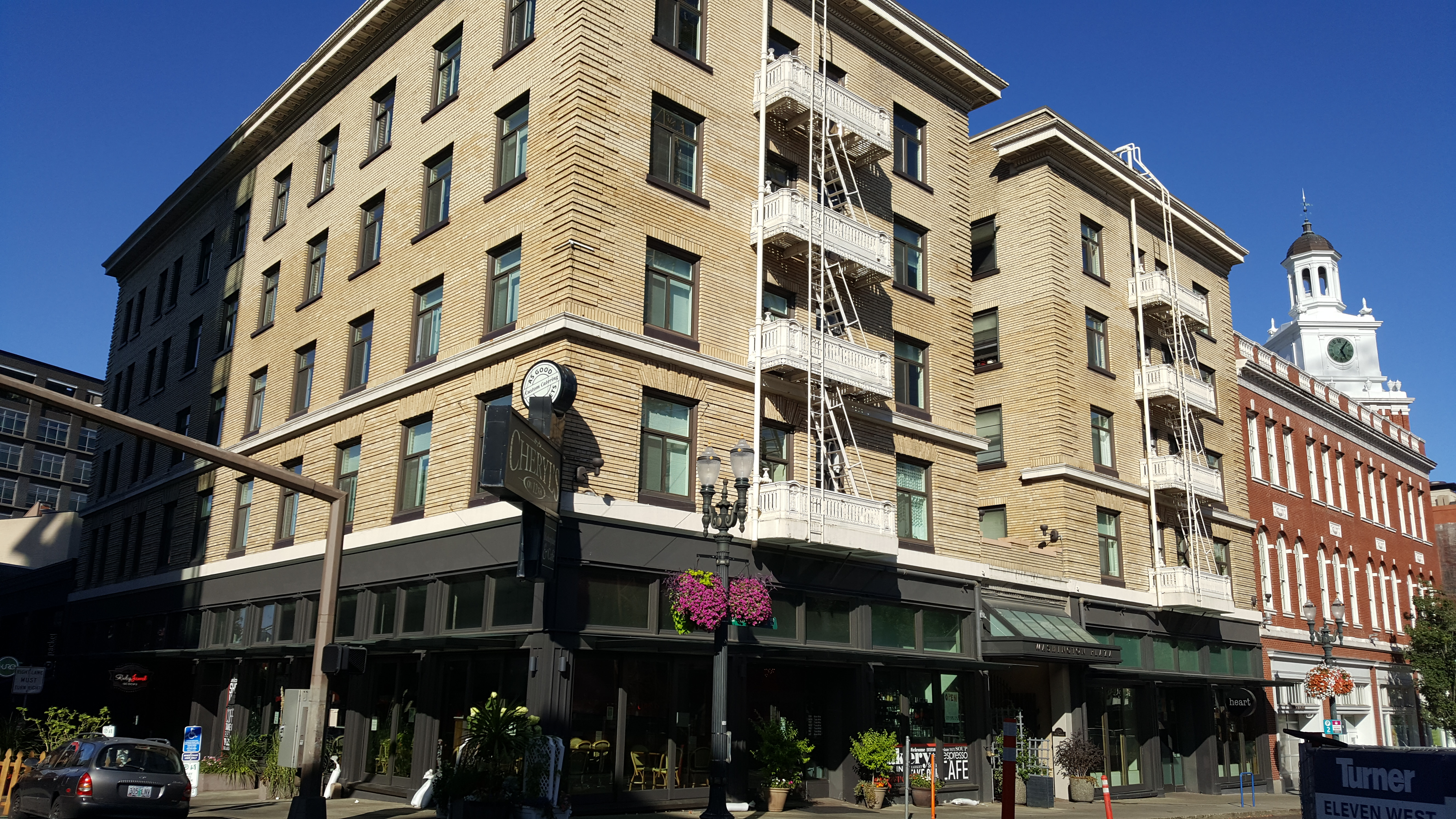
- The restaurant's exterior, 2020
- Interactive map of Cheryl's on 12th

Restaurant information
- Owners: Ed and Cheryl Casey
- Location: 1135 SW Washington Street, Portland, Oregon, 97205, United States
- Coordinates: 45.5219°N 122.6832°W
- Website: cherylson12th.com

Cheryl's on 12th is a restaurant in Portland, Oregon, United States.

== History ==
The restaurant is owned by Ed and Cheryl Casey and opened in 2012. In 2020, the restaurant closed temporarily because of the COVID-19 pandemic, but re-opened in late June.
