= Nuestra Cocina =

Mexican restaurant in Portland, Oregon, U.S.

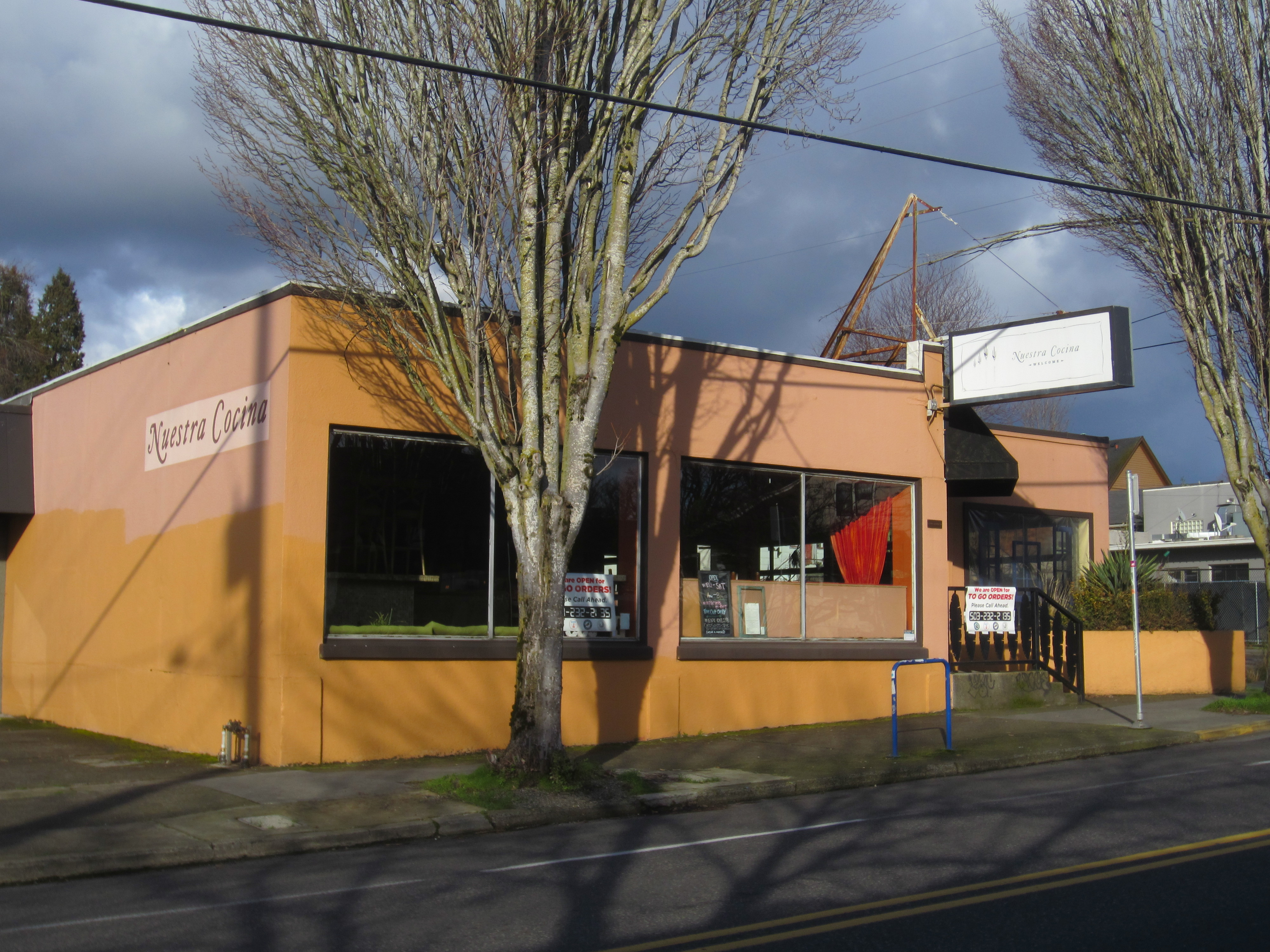
- The restaurant's exterior in 2021
- Interactive map of Nuestra Cocina

Restaurant information
- Established: 2004; 22 years ago
- Owners: Benjamin Gonzales; Shannon Dooley-Gonzales
- Food type: Mexican
- Location: 2135 Southeast Division Street, Portland, Oregon, Multnomah, Oregon, 97202, United States
- Coordinates: 45°30′18″N 122°38′37″W
- Website: nuestracocina.com

Nuestra Cocina (English: "Our Kitchen") is a Mexican restaurant in the Hosford-Abernethy neighborhood of southeast Portland, Oregon, in the United States. Benjamin Gonzales and Shannon Dooley-Gonzales are the restaurant's co-owners.

== History ==
Nuestra Cocina opened in 2004.

In 2016, the restaurant starting operating a taco food cart in northwest Portland called Frogtown Tacos.

== Reception ==
In 2013, the restaurant was included in Travel + Leisure's list of "Best Mexican Restaurants in the U.S." Similarly, Nuestra Cocina ranked number 50 on The Daily Meal's 2014 list of "America's 50 Best Mexican Restaurants". Krista Garcia and Seiji Nanbu included the restaurant in Eater Portland's 2022 list of the city's 17 "standout" Mexican restaurants and food carts.

== See also ==
- Hispanics and Latinos in Portland, Oregon
- List of Mexican restaurants
