= Kay's Bar =

Bar and restaurant in Portland, Oregon, U.S.

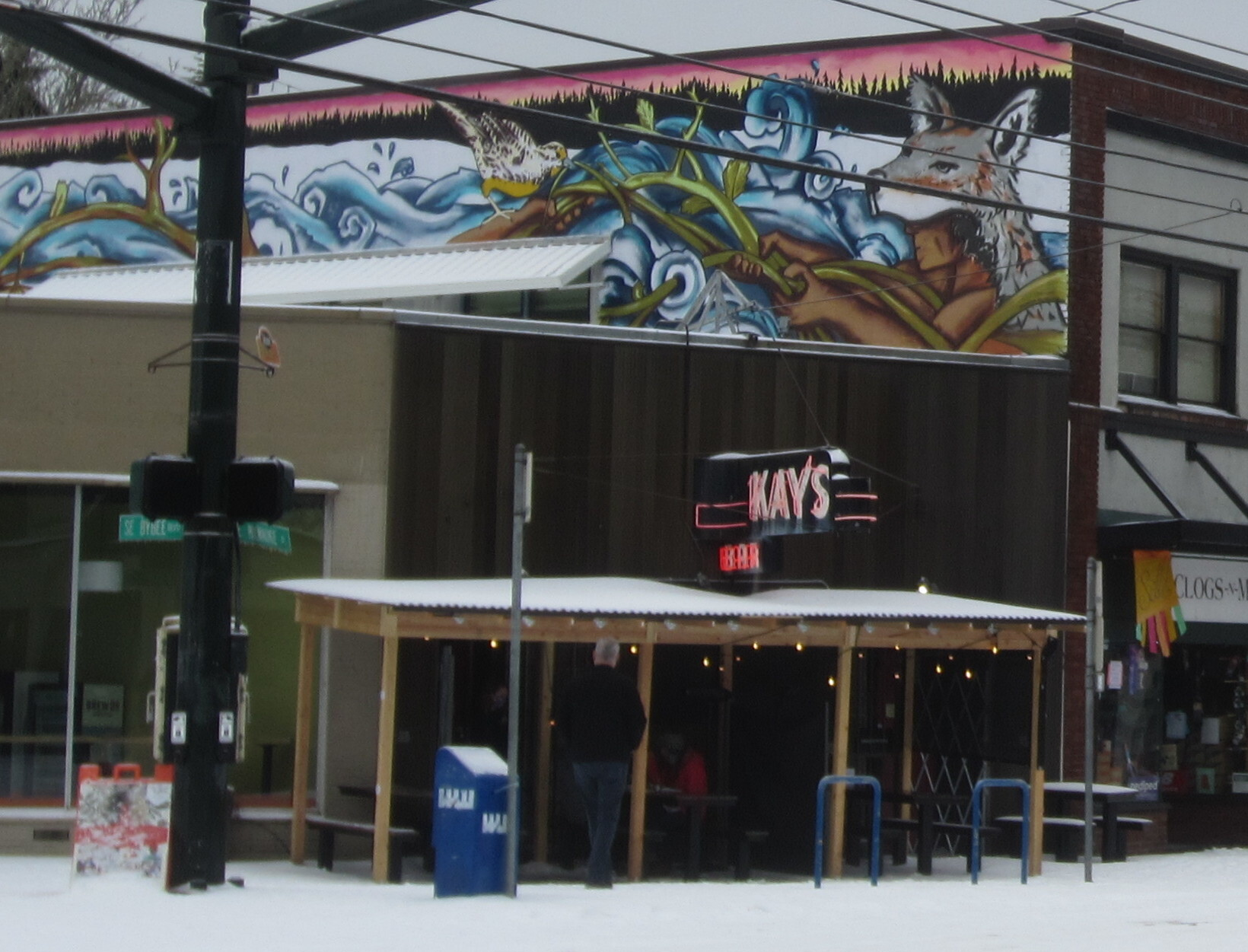
- The restaurant's exterior in February 2021
- Interactive map of Kay's Bar

Restaurant information
- Established: 1934
- Owner: Patrick Morton
- Previous owners: Edward "Ed" H. MacGregor and Sharon Ruzicka MacGregor
- Location: 6903 Southeast Milwaukie Avenue, Portland, Multnomah, Oregon, United States
- Coordinates: 45.4739°N 122.6489°W

Kay's Bar is a bar and restaurant in Portland, Oregon, United States.

== Description and history ==
Kay's Bar is located at the intersection of Milwaukie Avenue and Bybee Boulevard in southeast Portland's Sellwood-Moreland neighborhood. The business was established in 1934. Spouses Edward "Ed" H. MacGregor and Sharon Ruzicka MacGregor purchased Kay's in 1963. Patrick Morton became the owner in 2006. The interior features wood panelling and a mural painted by an employee. The restaurant is reportedly haunted. According to Morton, at least three people have died at Kay's. Outside the bar is an 11 x 60 foot mural by Andrew Young.

== Reception ==
In his 2016 overview of "Where Portland's Best Bartenders Go on Their Rare Nights Off", Thrillist contributor Alex Frane said Kay's has a "surprisingly good cocktail program". In Eater Portland's 2019 list of "Where to Imbibe and Dine in Sellwood and Westmoreland", Frane wrote, "Kay's Bar, with its divey, diner-like atmosphere, is bustling most nights, with reliable food, affordable well drinks and pints, and a modest-but-creative cocktail menu. The kitchen puts out classic, well-made bar staples, including a variety of burgers, burritos, and mac and cheese, and offers many dishes on the happy hour menu from 3 to 6 p.m. Notably, the bar has been open in some form or another since 1934, making it significantly older than most of its guests."

== See also ==
- Reportedly haunted locations in Oregon
