= Virginia Cafe =

Restaurant and bar in Portland, Oregon, U.S.

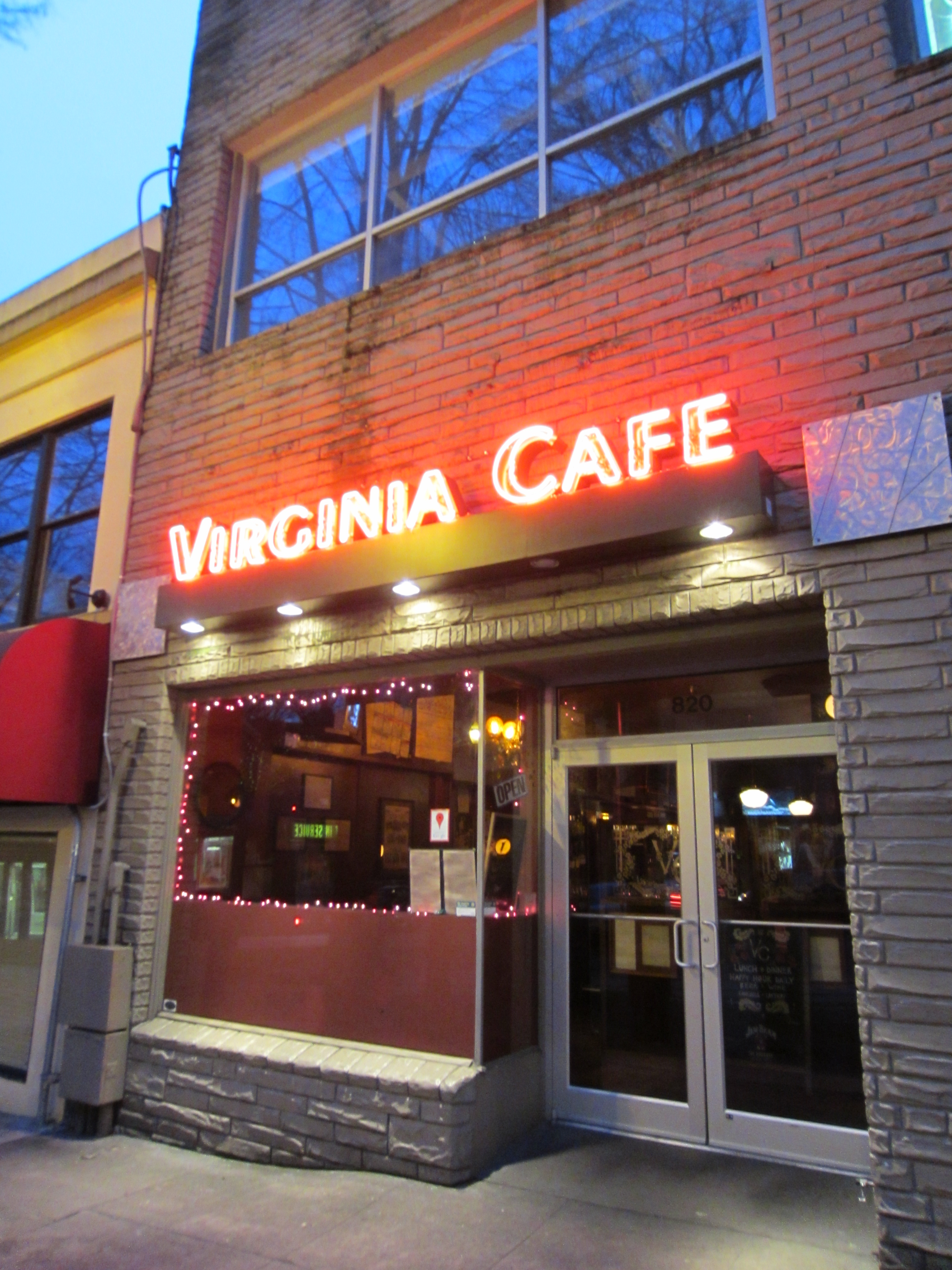
- Virginia Cafe in 2012
- Interactive map of Virginia Cafe

Restaurant information
- Established: 1914
- Location: Portland, Oregon, United States
- Coordinates: 45.5189°N 122.6825°W
- Website: www.virginiacafepdx.com

Virginia Cafe, sometimes known colloquially as "VC", is a restaurant and bar in Portland, Oregon.

== History ==
While the origin of the café's name is unknown, the original Virginia Cafe was opened in 1914 at 1014 SW Stark Street by three Greek immigrant brothers (Theodore, William and Christopher Dussin) after they were laid off from their jobs. The brothers opened a second location at 725 SW Park Avenue in downtown Portland in 1922, which lasted until 2007 when it was replaced by a $150 million, 35-story office tower built by Tom Moyer's TMT Development firm.

During Prohibition, when alcohol could not be served, the café made most of its money by selling sandwiches and soups to a lunch crowd. Ownership of the business was passed down to Christopher's son, Constantine "Guss" Dussin, then eventually Asa Arnsberg, a Portland real estate investor. Both restaurants reportedly "thrived" during the 1940s and 1950s.

Bob Rice owns the restaurant, as of 2017.
