= Zuckercreme =

Bakery and market in Portland, Oregon, U.S.

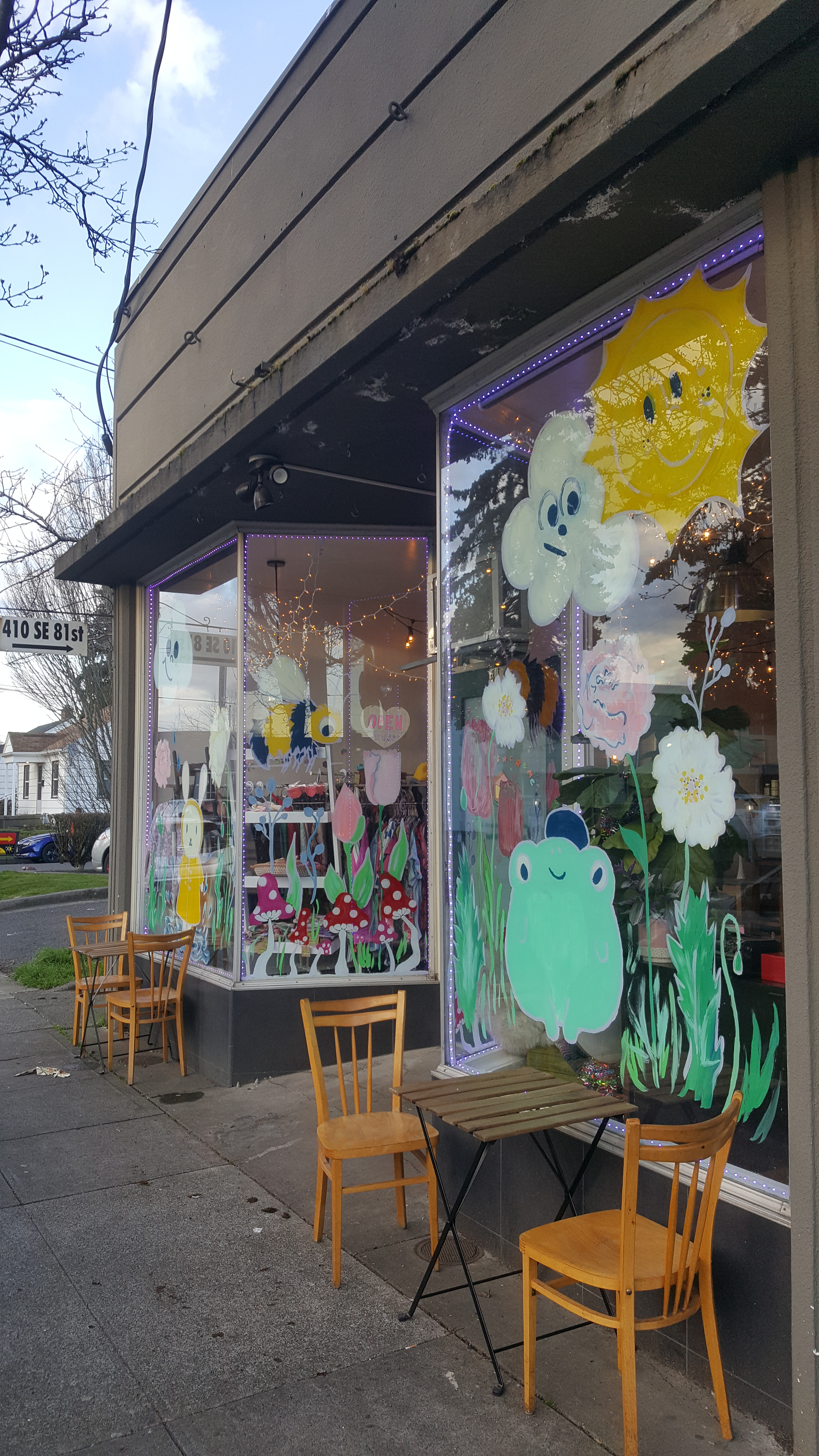
- The shop's exterior in 2022
- Interactive map of Zuckercreme

Restaurant information
- Established: 2021
- Owner: Brittany Sigal
- Location: 414 Southeast 81st Avenue, Portland, Multnomah, Oregon, 97215, United States
- Coordinates: 45.5196°N 122.5804°W

Zuckercreme is a bakery, cafe, and market in Portland, Oregon's Montavilla neighborhood, in the United States.

== Description ==
Brooke Jackson-Glidden of Eater Portland has described Zuckercreme ("sugar cream" in German) as "a bakery, market, and cafe with themed seasonal events" such as Pumpkin Spice Fest. She has also described the shop as a "market-meets-cafe-meets-bakery-meets-pop-up-space with a rotating set of contributing bakers, a retail section featuring Oregon-made home goods, and a pastry cases full of seasonal treats like sugar cream pie". Carina Hernandez of Willamette Week said the shop "looks like a knickknack shop from the outside, but it's full of useful—surprisingly practical—locally made goods". She also wrote, "Zuckercreme is almost the antithesis of the homogenized road-stop eatery."

The business has served baked goods, pies, apple cider, and coffee. One of the interior walls features a mural by local artist Brianna Vizcaino, depicting flowers, fruits, and vegetables. Hernandez said the artwork "looks like something a child could wonder about for hours or a cool librarian might get tattooed all over their body". Products made by local vendors have included vegan nail polish, handmade crocheted nylon scrubbers, bath bombs, scented soaps, and felt pies.

== History ==
Brittany Sigal started Zuckercreme, named after the sugar cream pie, as a pop-up market in 2021. In addition to collaborating with other local businesses, she organized the a strawberry festival called the Portland Strawberry Museum in the pop-up space Küchenhaus. The event featured strawberry desserts, fresh berries, art, and other strawberry-themed products. Hernandez described the Strawberry Museum as a "hugely popular series of pop-ups".

Sigal opened a brick and mortar shop on October 1, 2021. The shop's debut event was Pumpkin Spice and Everything Nice, a community market with "fall favorites" such as pumpkin spice. November was pie month and December was "cozy AF" month. In 2022, Zuckercreme collaborated with Caffe Olli to host a Valentine's Day dinner. The event, called Smushly Love, featured "a five-course dinner of enoki bloom and mole poblano dish, mushroom terrine with sunchokes and guava chutney, a scallop aguachile with chanterelles and crispy crab, wood-fired halibut with yucca puree and king trumpets, and black velvet cake with dulce de leche ice cream and hazelnut crumble for dessert". Zuckercreme also hosted an Easter egg hunt, a book launch event, and a Halloween party in 2022.

== See also ==
- List of bakeries
