= Lovejoy Bakers =

Bakery in Portland, Oregon, U.S.

Coordinates: 45.5300°N 122.6816°W

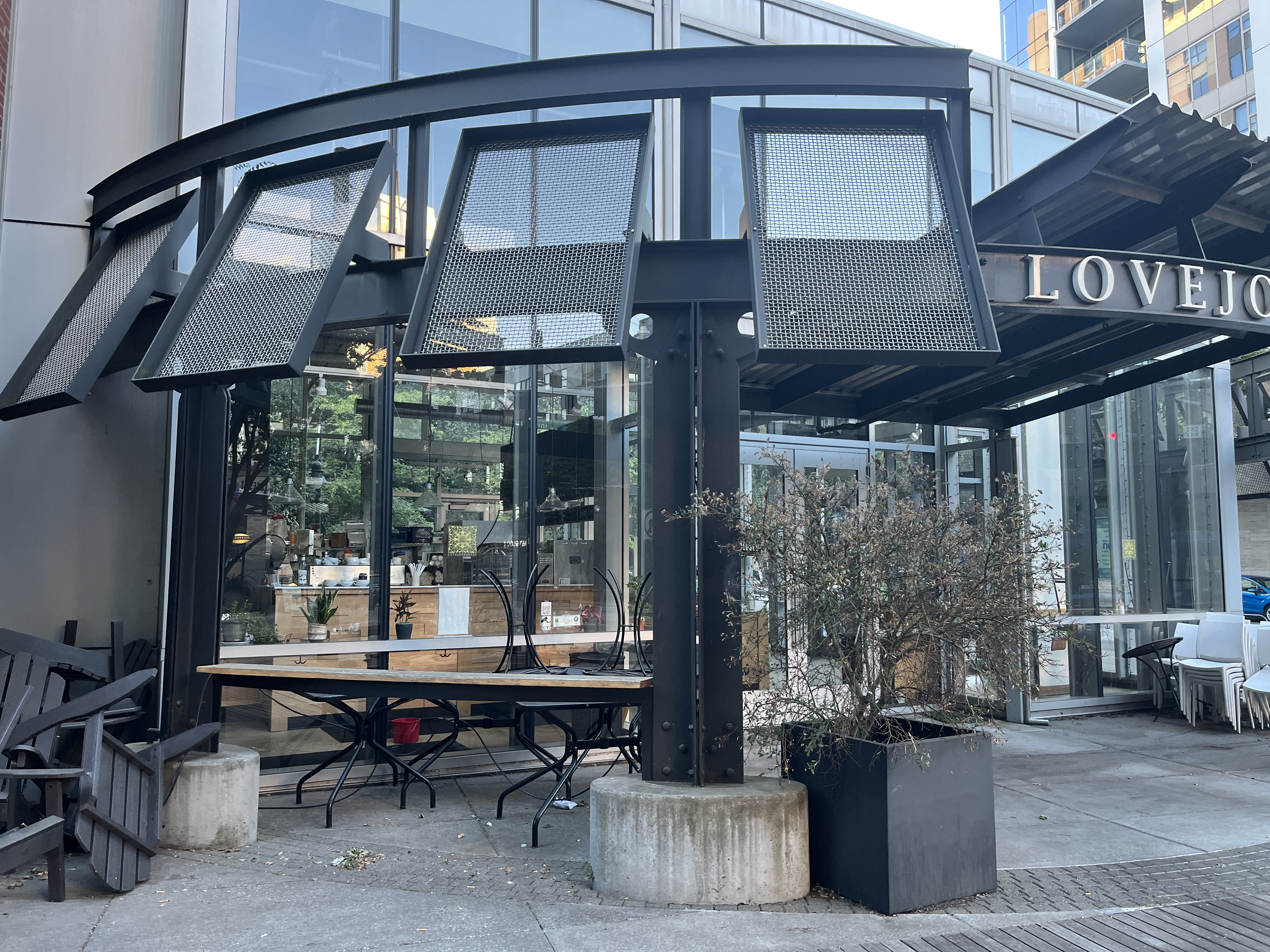
- Exterior of the bakery in northwest Portland, Oregon's Pearl District, 2022
- Interactive map of Lovejoy Bakers

Restaurant information
- Location: Portland, Oregon, United States
- Website: lovejoybakers.com

Lovejoy Bakers is a bakery with multiple locations in Portland, Oregon. The business is owned by Marc and Tracy Frankel.

== Description ==
Portland Monthly has described the Pearl District location as "a sun-flooded shop where a dozen types of bread (Griffin’s pride: a caraway rye), superb scones, pastries, pies, and croissants are thoroughly enjoyed by the neighborhood". There are additional locations in the South Waterfront district and in northwest Portland. The 2,300-square-foot space in the Pearl District has a seating capacity of approximately 60.

== History ==
Plans for Lovejoy Bakers to open in the Pearl District emerged in 2009. The bakery opened in November. Kyle MacLachlan visited the bakery in 2010. In addition to breakfast and lunch service, the Pearl District bakery began a dinner series in 2011.

A second location opened in southeast Portland in May 2012. Plans for the South Waterfront location were announced in 2013. The third location opened in 2014. The Pearl District and South Waterfront locations launched Dinners To Go in 2015. The South Waterfront bakery offered coupons for free cookies and coffee during TriMet's 2015 opening of the MAX Orange Line.

== Reception ==
Chad Walsh included Lovejoy Bakers in Eater Portland's 2016 list of "9 Mind-Blowing Breakfast Bakeries in Portland". Alex Frane included the bakery in the website's 2021 list of "17 Spots to Grab Amazing Breakfast Sandwiches".

== See also ==
- List of bakeries
