= Portland Indigenous Marketplace =

Recurring market in Portland, Oregon, U.S.

Logo

The Portland Indigenous Marketplace (PIM) is a recurring market in Portland, Oregon, United States. Established in 2017, the market showcases works by Indigenous artists and entrepreneurs. Vendors sell food and other products such as beaded cords, paintings, and pottery. Lluvia Merello is the executive director.

PIM hosted virtual activities during the COVID-19 pandemic. Market locations in 2021 included Tilikum Plaza at the west end of the Tilikum Crossing, as well as a parking lot near Montavilla Park. The Architectural Heritage Center also featured works by PIM in 2021. In 2024, PIM partnered with other organizations to present Frybread Fest at Director Park to commemorate National American Indian Heritage Month. The Oregon Convention Center was among market locations in 2025. The Native American Student and Community Center on the Portland State University campus is a recurring host for the market. PIM hosted a conference with speakers and performances to commemorate Indigenous Peoples' Day in 2026.

PIM also has been a recipient of World Forestry Center's complimentary venue grant program.

== See also ==
- Culture of Portland, Oregon
- Indigenous Peoples' Day in Portland, Oregon
- Jade International Night Market
- My People's Market
- Portland Night Market
- Portland Saturday Market
