= Portland Night Market =

Night market in Portland, Oregon, U.S.

- Logo

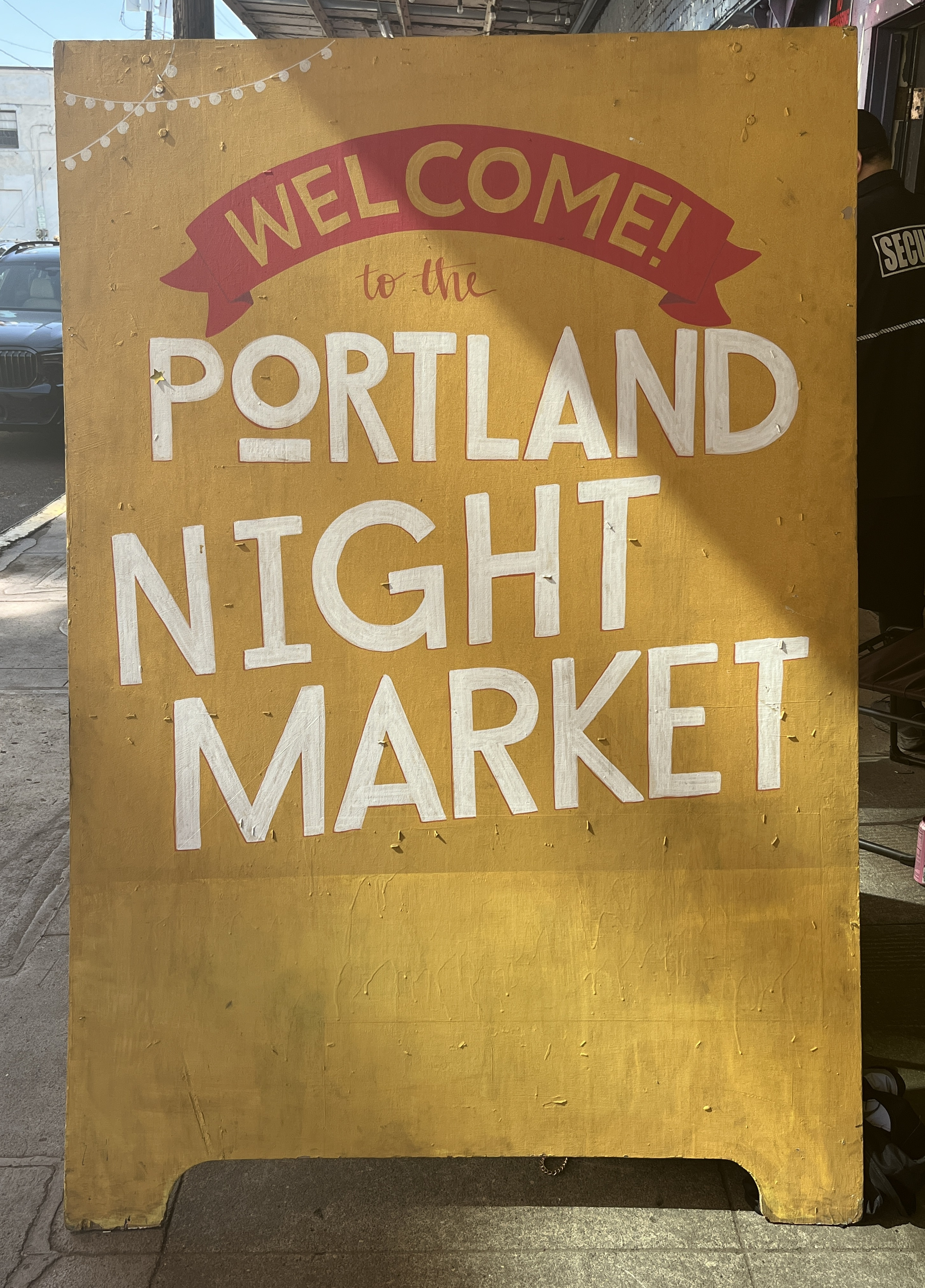
- Sign for the Portland Night Market at Snack Fest, 2025
- Status: Active
- Locations: Portland, Oregon, U.S.
- Coordinates: 45.5177°N 122.6641°W
- Country: United States
- Years active: 10–11
- Website: pdxnm.com

The Portland Night Market is a night market in Portland, Oregon, United States. It operates approximately six times per year in southeast Portland's Buckman neighborhood, hosting approximately 175 vendors of food and other products. Spouses Dustin and Emma Evans launched the series in 2015 and have also organized the affiliated event Snack Fest since 2019.

== Description ==
The night market operates approximately six times per year in the Alder Block of Buckman's Central Eastside Industrial District, in a warehouse and an adjacent parking lot. Inspired by similar markets in Vancouver and Asia, the Portland Night Market features approximately 175 vendors selling food and other products such as art, candles, clothing, jewelry, plants, pottery, and toys. Notable food vendors have included Flying Fish Company and Pip's Original Doughnuts & Chai. The market has also hosted goats, llamas, and a replica of the DeLorean from Back to the Future.

== History ==
Established in 2015, the Portland Night Market is organized by spouses Dustin and Emma Evans. During the COVID-19 pandemic, the market went on a hiatus in 2020 and was scaled back in 2021.

The market has collaborated with the Legendary Makers Market, which is Oregon's largest Asian American market. It has had themes such as "Tunnel of Love" (Valentine's Day) and "Summer Camp Edition" in 2026. In 2026, the market was among local restaurants, community organizations, and other businesses that joined the "We Are Rip City" campaign in support of the Moda Center renovation project. There was a "spooky" edition of the market in October 2026.

=== Snack Fest ===
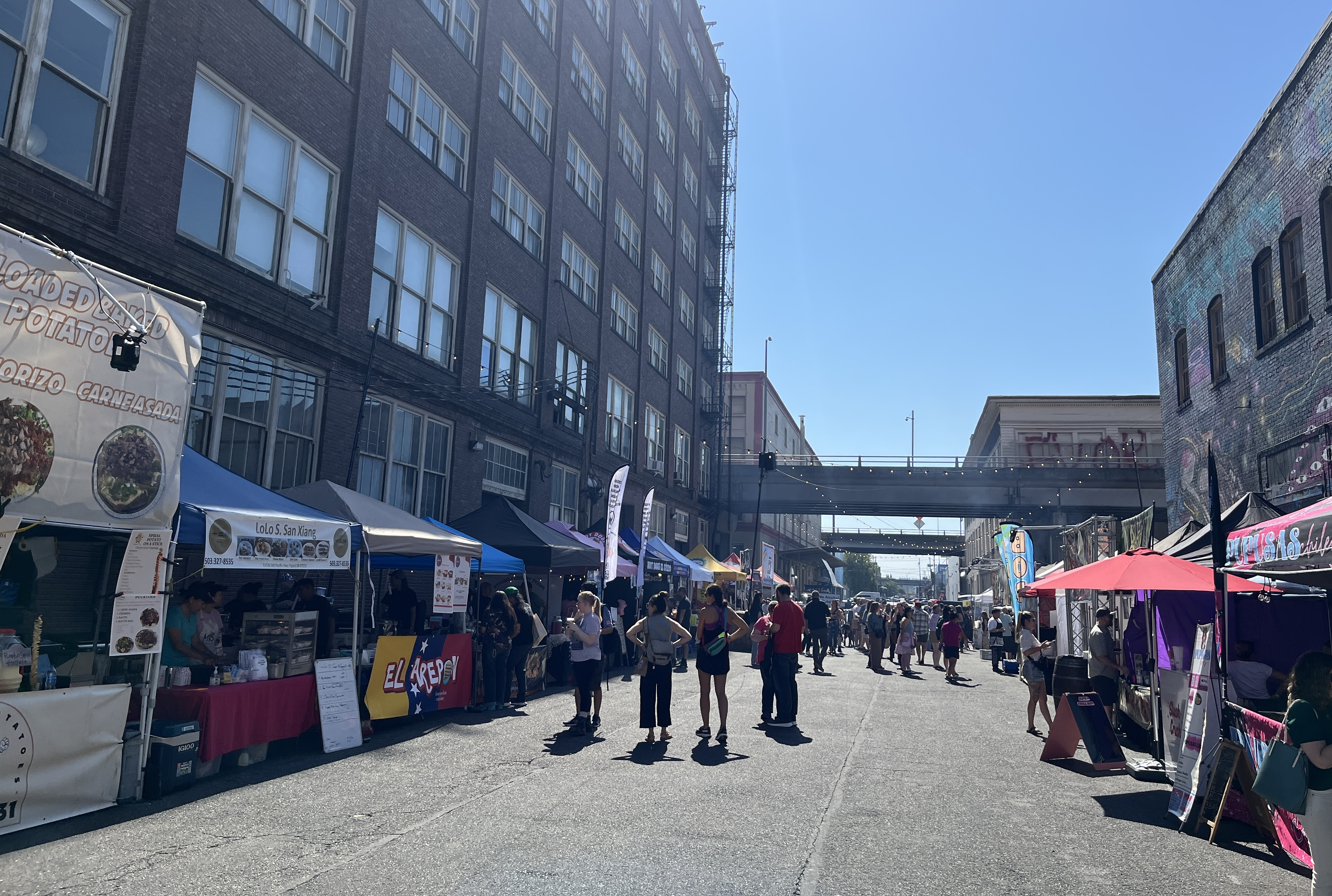
Snack Fest, 2025

The organizers of the Portland Night Market have also created Snack Fest (also known as Snack Fest PDX, SnackFest, or Snackfest PDX), an annual culinary festival focused on snacks. The couple came up with the concept after Emma experienced pregnancy cravings in 2018. The event is free to attend and all money spent goes to vendors. There are also food carts and trucks, classes and demonstrations, food competitions, and meetups.

The first event was held in 2019. The 2022 event was attended by approximately 11,000 people. Two events were scheduled in 2023. Hundreds of people attended Snack Fest in 2024. The 2024 event had approximately 100 vendors. Mikiko Mochi Donuts has been a vendor.

== Reception ==
In 2023, Sarah Klein included Portland Night Market in The Daily Meal's list of the fourteen best night markets in the U.S. "for foodies".

== See also ==
- Culture of Portland, Oregon
- Jade International Night Market
- My People's Market
- Portland Indigenous Marketplace
- Portland Saturday Market
