= Asia Mall =

Shopping mall in Eden Prairie, Minnesota

- Location: Eden Prairie, Minnesota, U.S.
- Coordinates: 44.8628°N 93.4324°W
- Address: 12160 Technology Drive
- Opened: November 20, 2022
- Developer: Marshall Nguyen / Wyn Group
- Owner: Group of local AAPI investors
- Num. of stores: 10+
- Num. of anchor tenants: 1
- Floor area: 116,000 sq ft (10,800 m^{2})
- Floors: 2
- Parking: On-premise surface lot & underground
- Website: www.asiamallmn.com

Asia Mall is a multi-tenant shopping mall in Eden Prairie, Minnesota, anchored by an Asian supermarket with a focus on Asian cuisine and culture. Many of its tenants are restaurants focusing on specific regional cuisines, though others include a beauty salon and a travel agency. The mall lies between Interstate 494 / U.S. Highway Route 212, Prairie Center Drive, Flying Cloud Drive, and Technology Drive. Asia Mall has a gross floor area (GFA) of 116,000 square feet (10,700 m^{2}) and a gross leasable area (GLA) of 23,000 square feet (7,010 m^{2}). The site has a mix of surface lot and underground parking.

== History ==
The site that is now Asia Mall was previously the home of Eden Prairie's Gander Mountain location. The Eden Prairie Gander Mountain was developed by Oppidan and opened March 2007. Eden Prairie's Gander Mountain later rebranded and renovated as Gander Outdoors under the Camping World ownership group after the 2017 Gander Mountain bankruptcy, before closing again in 2019, citing poor sales.

After an involved adaptive reuse project, Asia Mall had a limited soft opening from November 10-19, 2022 ahead of its grand opening on November 20. The November 20 opening was attended by local dignitaries U.S. Representative Dean Phillips, Minnesota House Representative Jim Nash, and Eden Prairie mayor Ron Case. A parking lot expansion was approved in 2024, raising the site's total parking capacity to over 400.

Since the 2022 opening, Asia Mall has hosted annual community events celebrating the Lunar New Year known for live music, dancing including a dragon dance, calligraphy, and other related activities.

== Tenants ==
- Bober Tea and Mochi Dough
- Hot Pot City
- Pho Mai
- HomeTaste Hongkong Cuisine
- CrunCheese Korean Hotdog
- Dosirak Korean BBQ & Bibimbap
- Legendary Spice Chinese Kitchen & Bar
- Uni Uni Bubble Tea
- Ebi Sushi Box
- Tuk Tuk Thai
- Ebisu Life Store
- Hair Salon Suites
- CIAC Travel Inc
- Beauty Lab
- Dragon Vape Shop
- Stallion Group
