= Bober Tea and Mochi Dough =

Chain of bubble tea and mochi donut shops

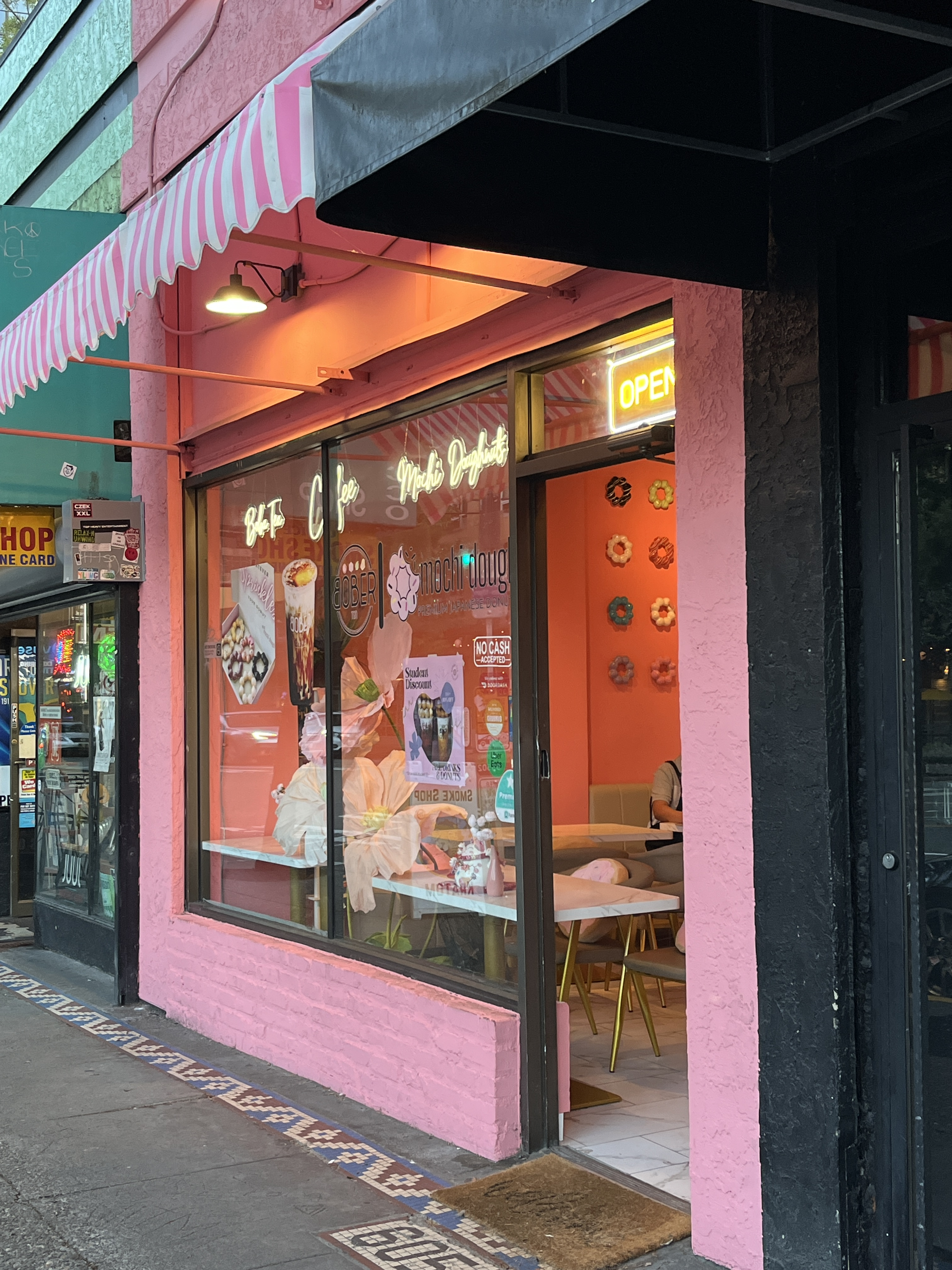
Exterior of Bober Tea and Mochi Dough in Seattle, 2024

Bober Tea and Mochi Dough is a chain of bubble tea and mochi donut shops, featuring Bober Tea-branded drinks and Mochi Dough-branded doughnuts.

The chain operates in China, the Philippines, Singapore, and the United States.

== Menu ==
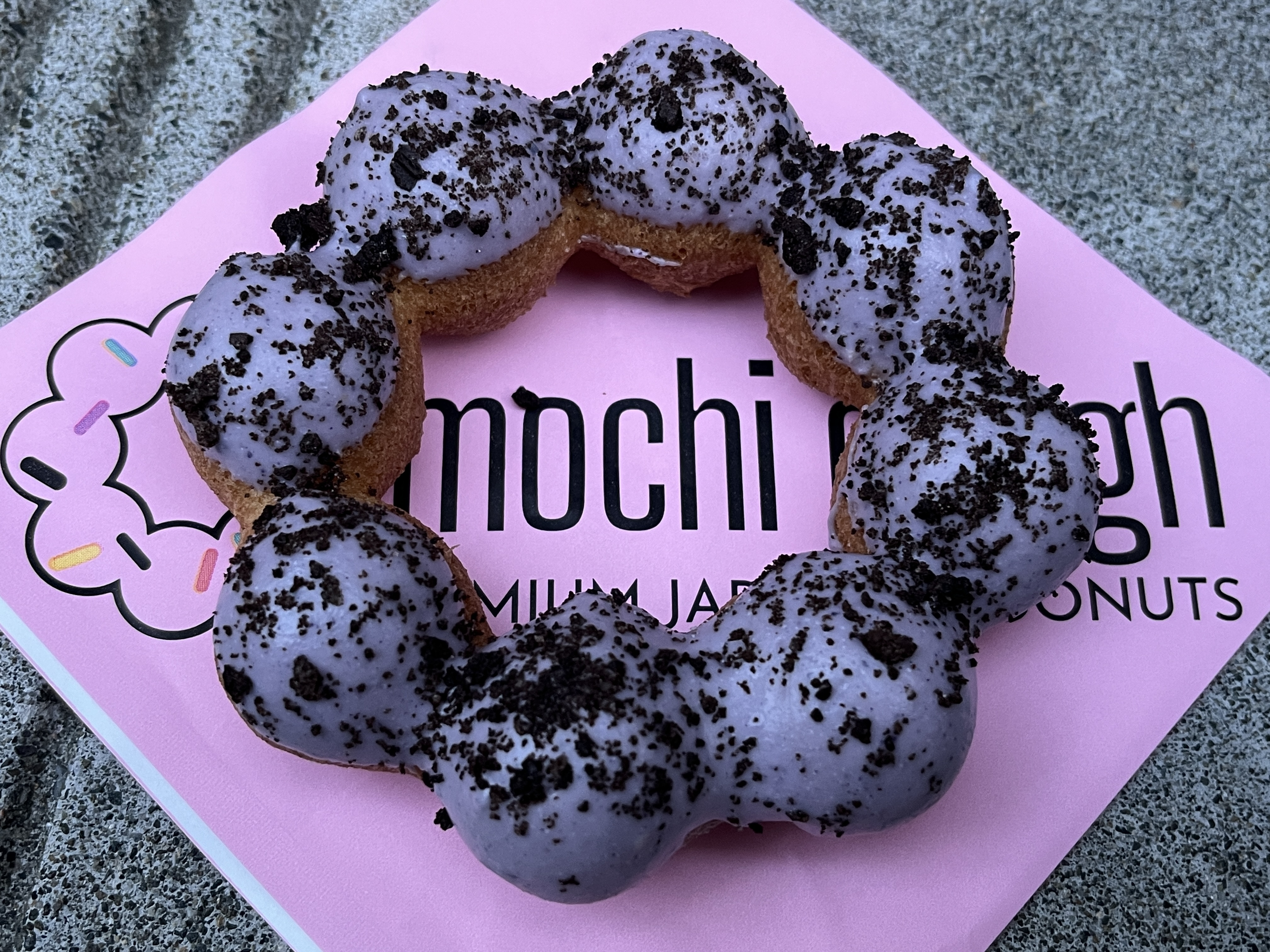
Dirty taro variety of a Mochi Dough-branded mochi donut

Bober Tea-branded drinks include the Okumidori Matcha Latte, the Supreme Pink Pear Green Team, and the Thai Tea Latte. Shops also serve milk teas, some of which are topped with salty cream cheese foam. Mochi Dough-branded doughnut varieties include black sesame, churro, funnel cake, and taro.

== History and locations ==
The company was established in 2017. There are locations in China, the Philippines, and Singapore.

=== United States ===
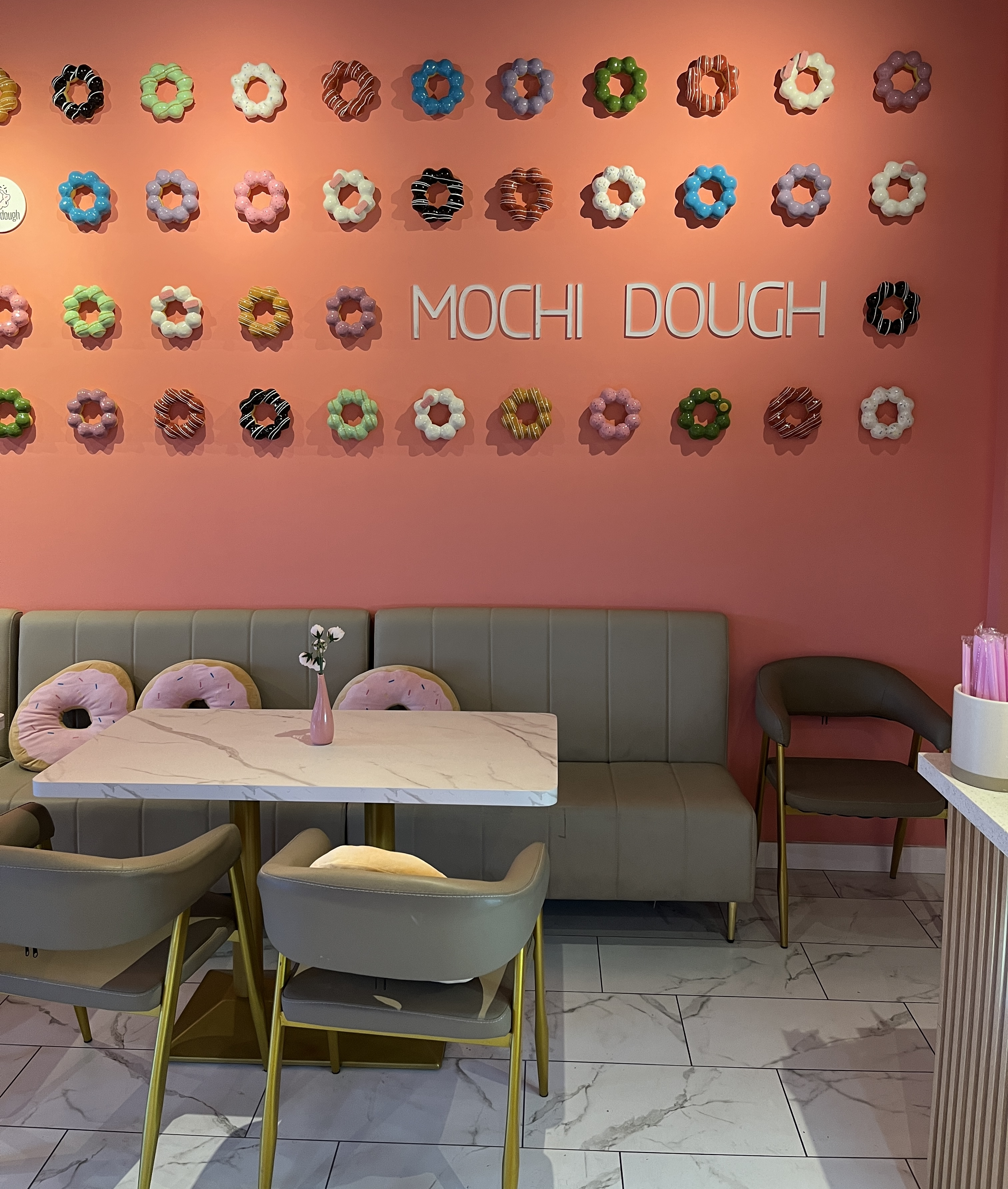
Interior of the Bober Tea and Mochi Dough shop in Seattle in 2024

In the United States, Bober Tea USA and Mochi Dough USA launched in Sacramento and has grown to 25 franchises in nine U.S. states as of October 10, 2023.

In Carmel, a shop on Carmel opened in December 2022. It was originally owned by Dave and Irene Tang, and later Aparna and Hari Prasad. In New Jersey, the chain operates in Bergen-Lafayette, Jersey City.

A combined Bober and Mochi shop opened at Green Firs Towne Center in University Place, in Tacoma, Washington, in October 2023. Owned by Van Duong and Tammy Phan, the Tacoma shop was the chain's first in Washington. The chain began operating on Seattle's Capitol Hill in 2024.

There is a combined Bober and Mochi shop on the University of Minnesota campus, in Dinkytown. Another combined franchise operates inside Asia Mall in Eden Prairie, Minnesota.

== See also ==
- List of restaurant chains
