= Mikiko Mochi Donuts =

Doughnut shop in Portland, Oregon, U.S.

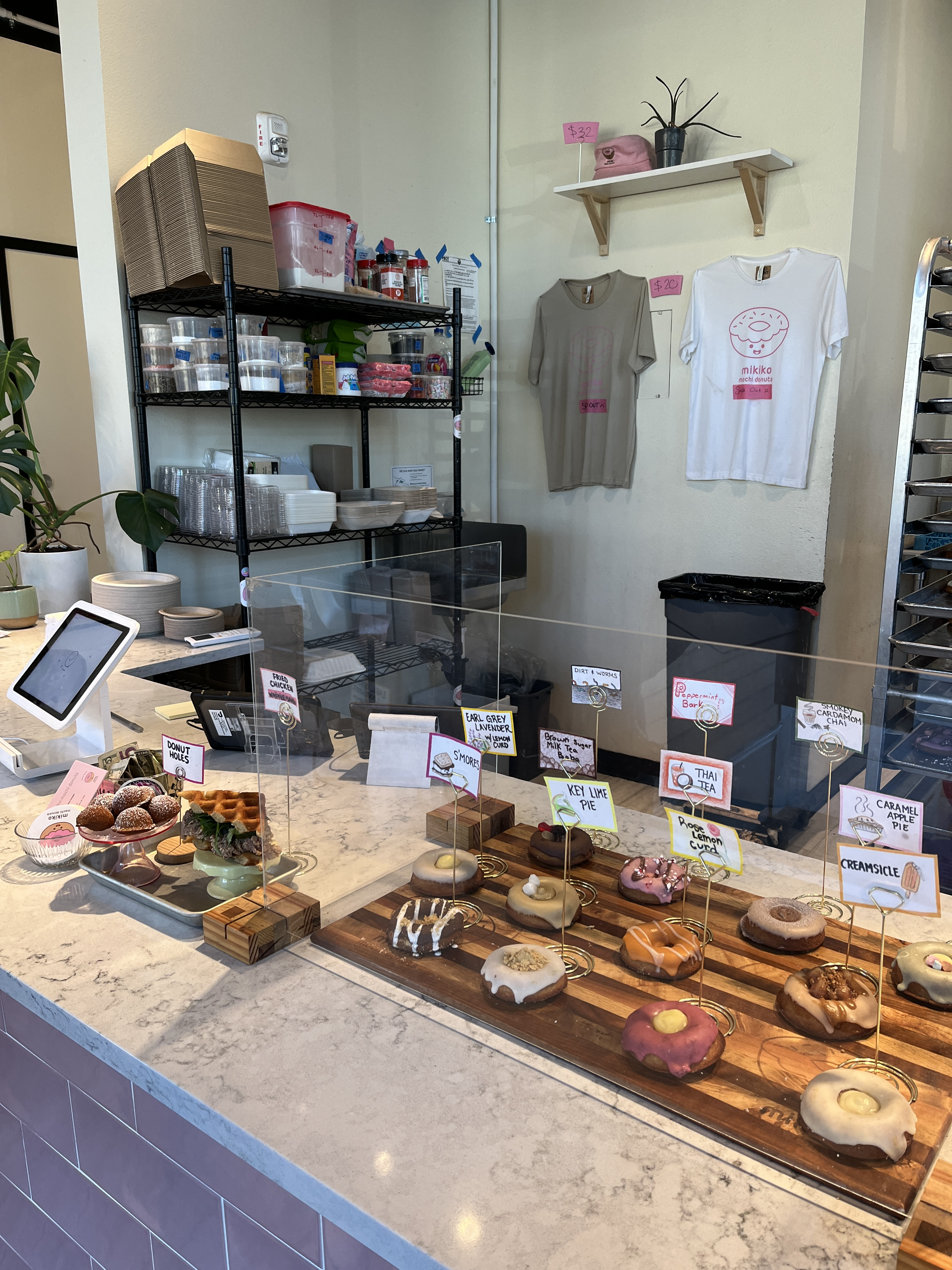
- The shop's interior, 2025
- Interactive map of Mikiko Mochi Donuts

Restaurant information
- Established: February 2020
- Owners: Emily Mikiko Strocher; Alex McGillivray
- Location: 300 Northeast 28th Avenue, Portland, Multnomah, Oregon, 97232, United States
- Coordinates: 45.5252°N 122.6371°W
- Website: mikikodonuts.com

Mikiko Mochi Donuts is a small chain of doughnut shops in the Portland metropolitan area, in the U.S. state of Oregon. Emily Mikiko Strocher and Alex McGillivray started the business as a pop-up restaurant in 2020, before launching a residency in northwest Portland later in the year, then opening a brick and mortar shop in the northeast Portland part of the Kerns neighborhood in 2022.

In 2024, a second location opened in Beaverton. The business has announced plans to open a location in Bethany Village, called Mikiko Jr., in 2025. Mikiki Mochi Donuts is opening in Bridgeport Village in 2026. The chain specializes in mochi donuts and has garnered a positive reception.

== Description ==
Mikiko Mochi Donuts operates doughnut shops in the Portland metropolitan area. The flagship shop is in the northeast Portland part of the Kerns neighborhood and the business has also operated in Beaverton, Bethany Village, and Bridgeport Village.

=== Menu ===
Mikiko specializes in dairy- and gluten-free mochi donuts. One variety is glazed with ube and dusted with li hing mui. Other varieties include Black Sesame & J, Horchata Pudding, Kat Dog, Plum Wine, the P.O.G. with guava curd, and Yuzu Funfetti. Mikiko has also offered doughnuts with matcha, pandan, passionfruit curd, and calamansi lemonade icing, as well as orange-colored Thai tea pastries.

== History ==
Emily Mikiko Strocher and Alex McGillivray started Mikiko as a pop-up restaurant. In February 2020, the couple sold 72 donuts in 30 minutes at a WeWork space. In September, Mikiko started a residency at the West space in northwest Portland. In 2021, the couple announced plans to open a brick and mortar shop in northeast Portland. The shop opened in 2022.

A second location opened in Beaverton in 2024. As of 2025, there are plans to close the Beaverton location and open another location in Bethany Village. The Bethany Village location is known as Mikiko Jr.

Mikiko began operating in Bridgeport Village in August 2026.

== Reception ==
In 2023, Zoe Baillargeon included Mikiko in Bon Appétit's list of Portland's eight best doughnut shops, and the business was included in Yelp's annual guide of the nation's top 100 doughnut shops. Rebecca Roland and Nick Townsend included the business in Eater Portland's 2024 list of the city's "most delicious" doughnuts. Sararosa Davies also included Mikiko in the website's 2025 overview of the city's best gluten-free restaurants and bakeries.

== See also ==
- List of doughnut shops
- List of restaurant chains in the United States
