= Sock It To Me (clothing company) =

Clothing company

- Industry: Apparel
- Founded: 2004 in Portland, Oregon, United States
- Founder: Carrie Atkinson
- Headquarters: Milwaukie, Oregon, United States
- Owner: Carrie Atkinson
- Website: www.sockittome.com

Sock It To Me is a company which sells socks and other apparel. It was founded in 2004, and is based in Milwaukie, Oregon. Its motto is "Be Awesome, Wear Awesome."

== History ==
Sock It To Me was founded by Carrie Atkinson in Portland, Oregon in 2004. After graduating from University of Nebraska–Lincoln with a degree in marketing, Atkinson spent two years considering various career options before deciding to start her own company. During a year in which she had taught English in South Korea, she had been impressed by the colorful, well-made socks that her students wore, and she launched her enterprise by importing them. After revisiting South Korea and bringing back two suitcases filled with 2,000 pairs of socks, she sold her first socks at the Portland Saturday Market. She was twenty-six years old. Eventually, she began designing her own styles and working with manufacturers in South Korea to create them. In 2005, she visited a few trade shows and began selling the socks wholesale. She saved up her money to attend the Magic trade show in Las Vegas.

In 2012, Atkinson hired Michelle Walker, a former PepsiCo marketing executive, to be the CEO of Sock It To Me. In 2015, the company moved its headquarters from Southeast Portland to Milwaukie, Oregon, and released its first underwear line. In 2018, Sock It To Me was one of the fastest-growing companies in Portland.

During the COVID-19 pandemic, Sock It To Me ran a sock drive for frontline healthcare workers and began producing reusable cloth masks. They hold an annual "Design a Sock" contest. The 2010 contest had 2,500 submissions from all over the world.
