= Portland Saturday Market =

Outdoor arts and crafts market in Portland, Oregon

Coordinates: 45.5225°N 122.6699°W

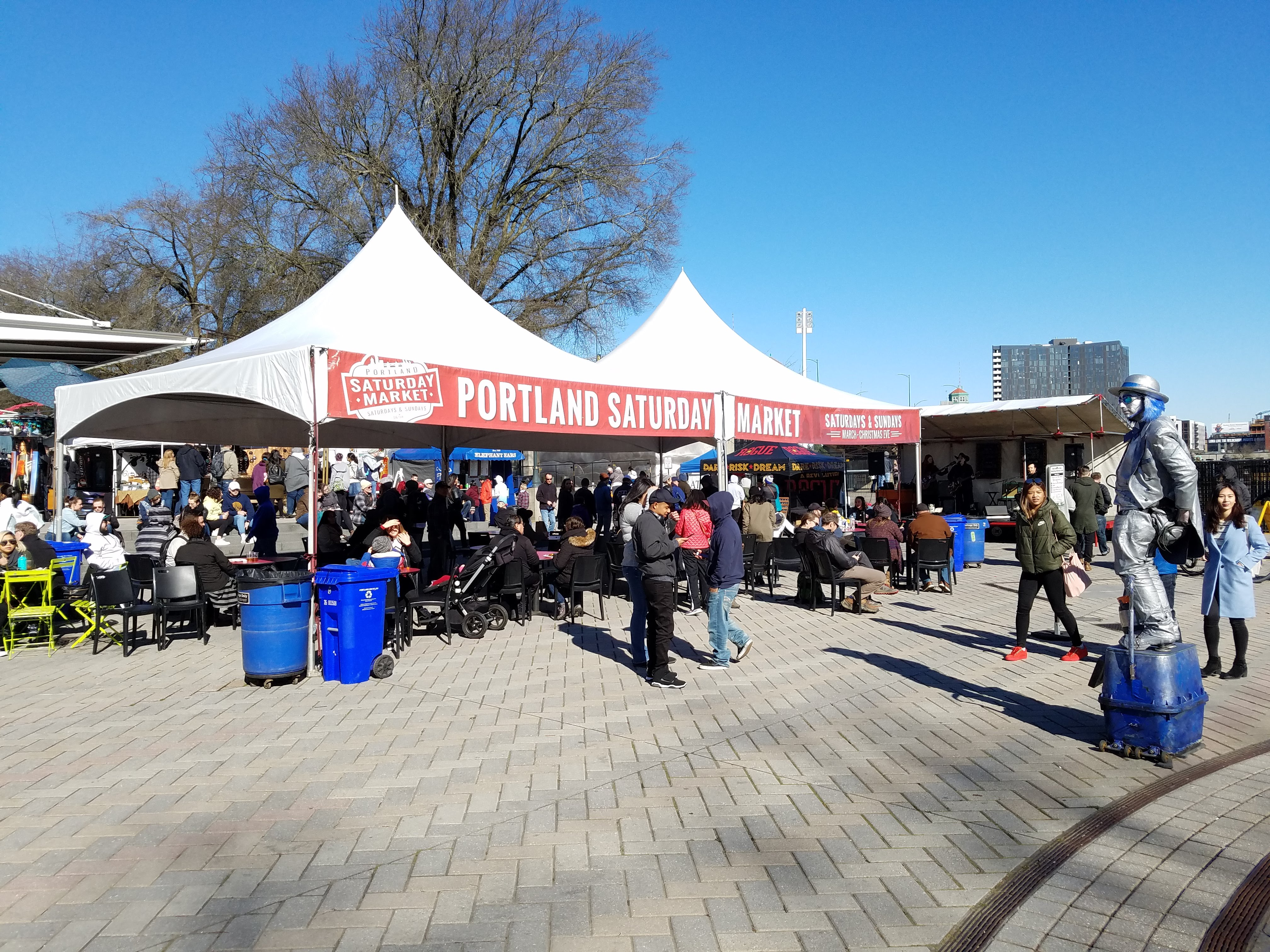
- Frequency: Weekly
- Locations: Tom McCall Waterfront Park; Ankeny Plaza
- Years active: 52
- Inaugurated: 1974
- Attendance: 1,000,000/yr
- Website: www.portlandsaturdaymarket.com

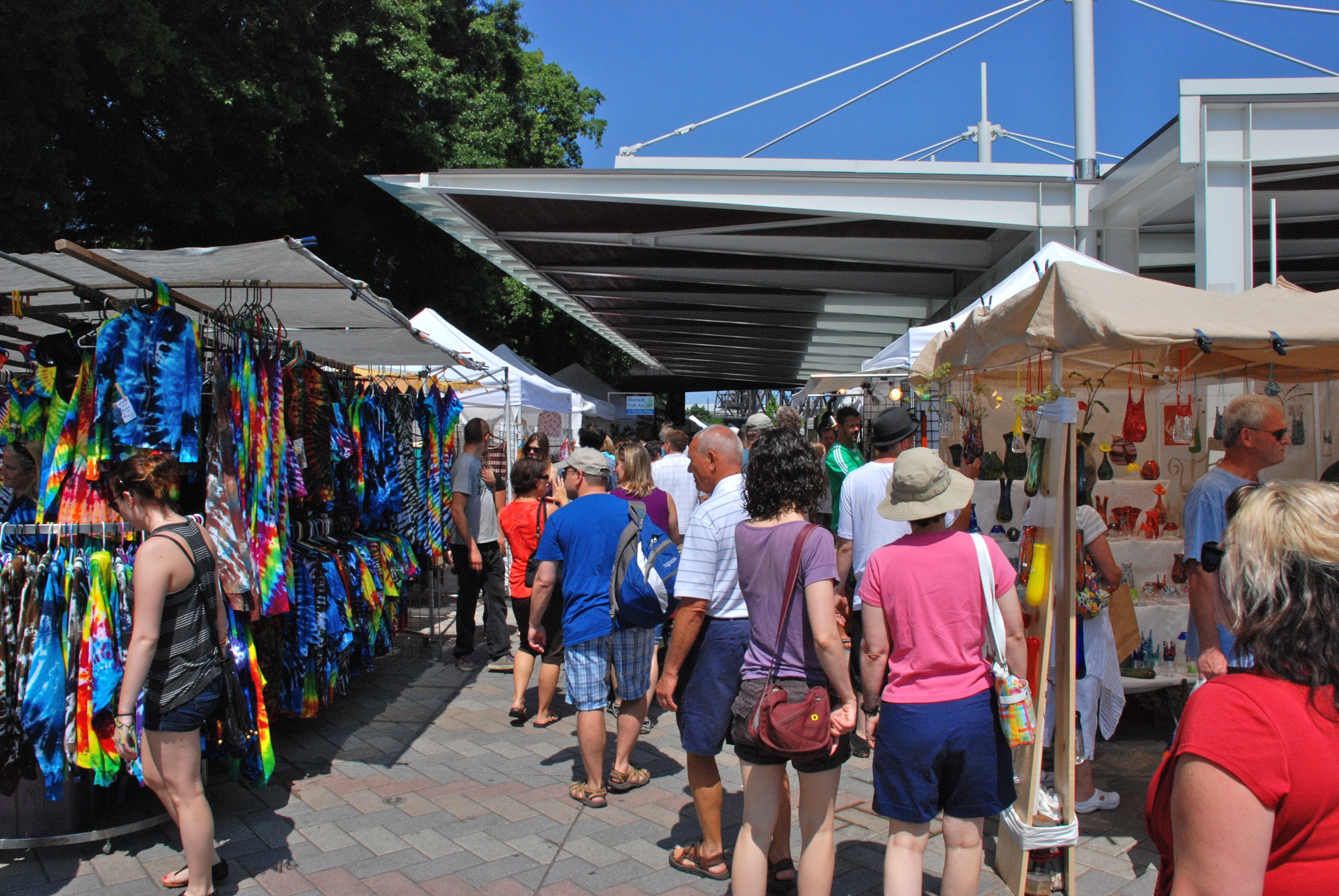
Shoppers and vendor stalls at Saturday Market in 2012

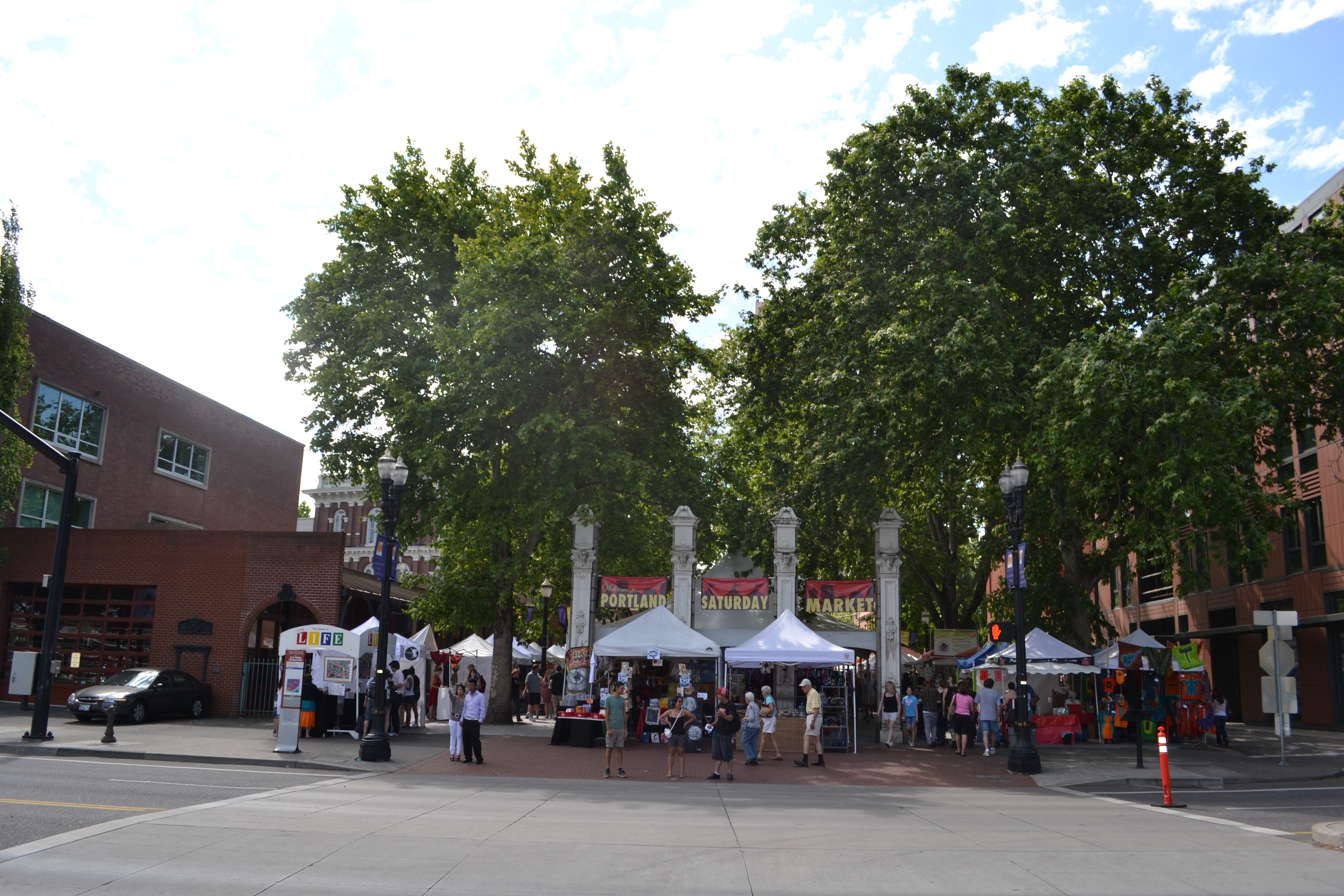
The market's Ankeny Square area, viewed from across SW Naito Parkway

The Portland Saturday Market and Portland Skidmore Market are a pair of seasonal outdoor arts, crafts, and food markets in Portland, Oregon held every Saturday from March through December. The Saturday Market is the largest continuously operated outdoor market in the United States.

The Saturday Market is located in Tom McCall Waterfront Park underneath and to the south of the Burnside Bridge, and the Skidmore Market is located in an adjacent plaza just across Naito Parkway, extending west to the Skidmore Fountain. Admission to both markets are free, and those who spend over $25.00 can receive either a free TriMet transit ticket or validated parking at SmartPark garages.

The markets combined have over 400 members and generate an estimated $12 million in gross sales annually. They have become a central economic engine for the historic Old Town Chinatown neighborhood, and attract an estimated 750,000 visitors to the area each year.

== Structure and mission ==
The Portland Saturday Market is a mutual-benefit non-tax-exempt nonprofit owned and run by the Members of the market. The Board of Directors and various committees are all run by members of the market, utilizing a democratic process. The focus of the market is on hand-crafted goods sold by the artisans who design and make them.

The mission of the Portland Saturday Market is to provide an environment that encourages the economic and artistic growth of emerging and accomplished artisans. Central to this mission shall be to operate a marketplace. That marketplace, and other market programs, shall honor craftsmanship, design innovation, marketing ethics, and authenticity of the product.

== History ==
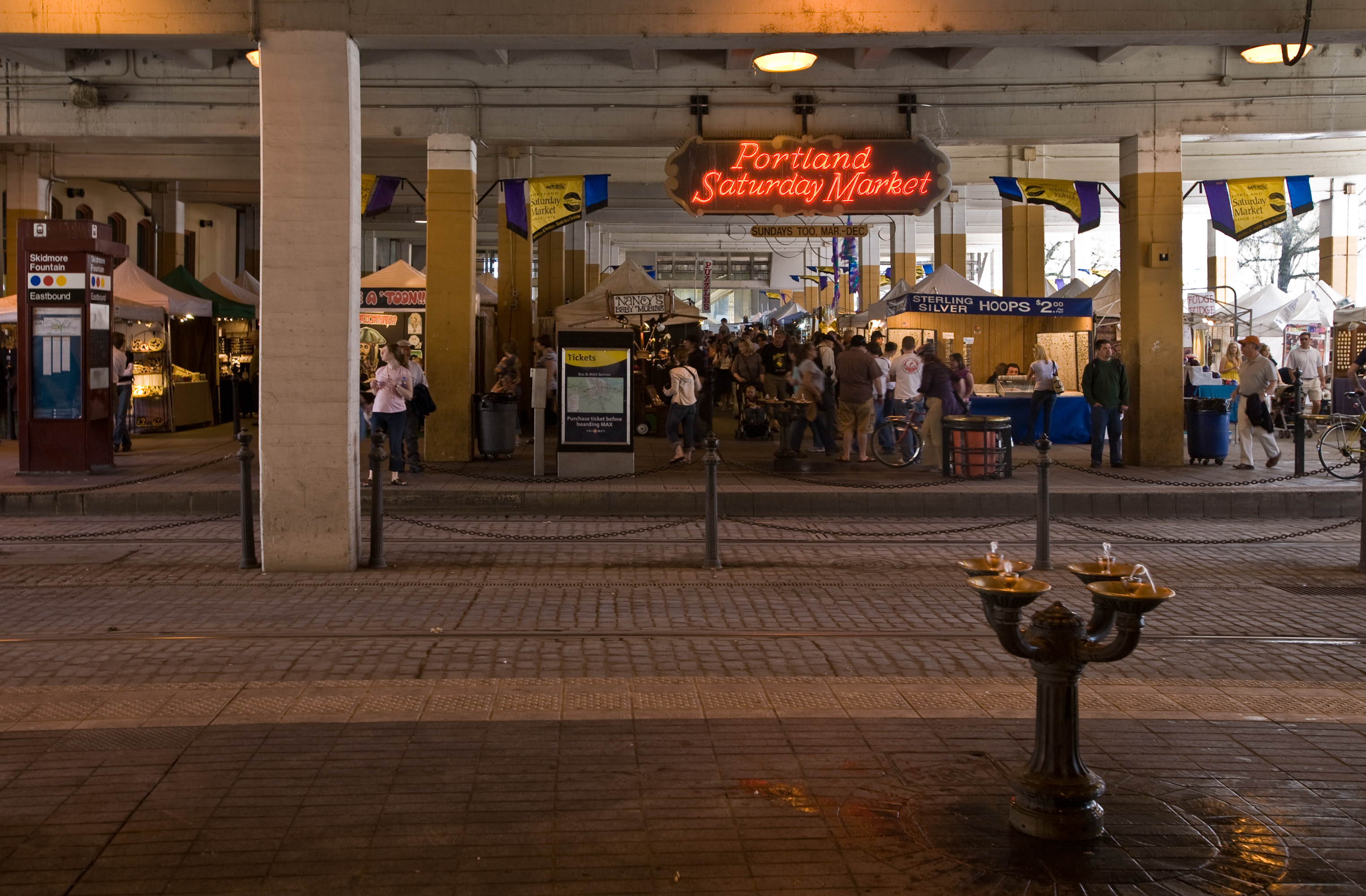
Portland Saturday Market's longtime former location, underneath the Burnside Bridge, in use 1976–2009

The Saturday Market was founded in 1974 by craftspeople Sheri Teasdale and Andrea Scharf, who modeled it after the Saturday Market in Eugene, Oregon. It was founded as a mutual benefit corporation, under which all members would share in the cost and governance of the market, yet keep all profits they receive from selling their items. All items sold at the Saturday Market are required to be handmade by the person selling it, and a committee of members judge each new item against a minimum standard of quality.

The Skidmore Market was organized in 1997 and is run by Skidmore Market Management LLC, a private company. Unlike the Saturday Market, artisans are permitted to sell imported products.

Sock It To Me, a sock and apparel company based out of Portland, started at the Saturday Market.

In 2024, the market was designated an Oregon Heritage Tradition by the Oregon Cultural Heritage Commission.

== Location ==
The group did not have a location for the market, until Bill Naito offered them a parking lot known as the "Butterfly lot". A large butterfly mural hangs over the market today commemorating the past. For the first year that the market operated, there was no specific site plan. A board of directors was established and the first chair was Scott Nay who worked in the Human Resources Department in the city of Portland. He was instrumental in hiring the first market manager Dana Comfort who along with a well chosen staff began to organize the site by and under the Burnside Bridge. A clear site plan was eventually created, marking out 8-by-8-foot (2.4 m × 2.4 m) booth spaces, defining aisles and a pattern for customer traffic. In 1976, the market moved to a site under the Burnside Bridge between First Avenue and Front Avenue (now Naito Parkway), where it then remained for the next 33 years.

=== Relocation in 2009 ===
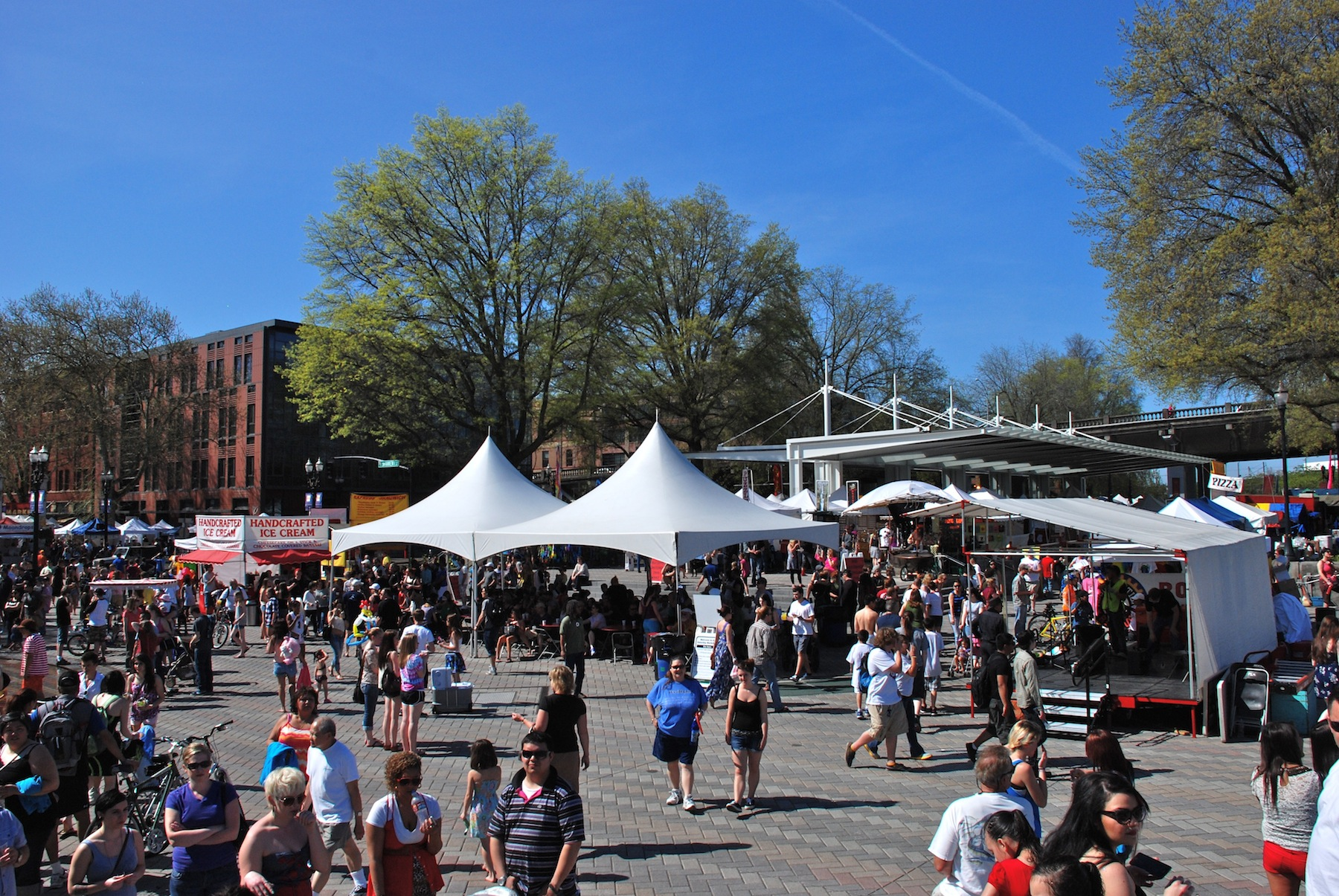
The south end of the market in 2012, in Waterfront Park

In April 2005, the Portland Development Commission and Portland Saturday Market began a study of potential sites that serve as a permanent location for the Saturday Market. Although the market had already been operating for three decades, it had always existed on a patchwork of short-term leases with private property owners, providing little or no long-term certainty. That situation was viewed as a disincentive to capital investment, due to a lack of mid-week activities on the site, and as reinforcing adverse social conditions, creating an unsafe area within the neighborhood along with the additional burden of weekly cleaning of the site before Market use. The long-range major goals for the Market included: a permanent location, improved infrastructure, and more protection from the weather, needing to be met in a cost-efficient manner. In October 2005, the city launched its own study, called the "Ankeny/Burnside Development Framework Project", to assess the opportunities for the area and how best to direct public funding to increase private investment.

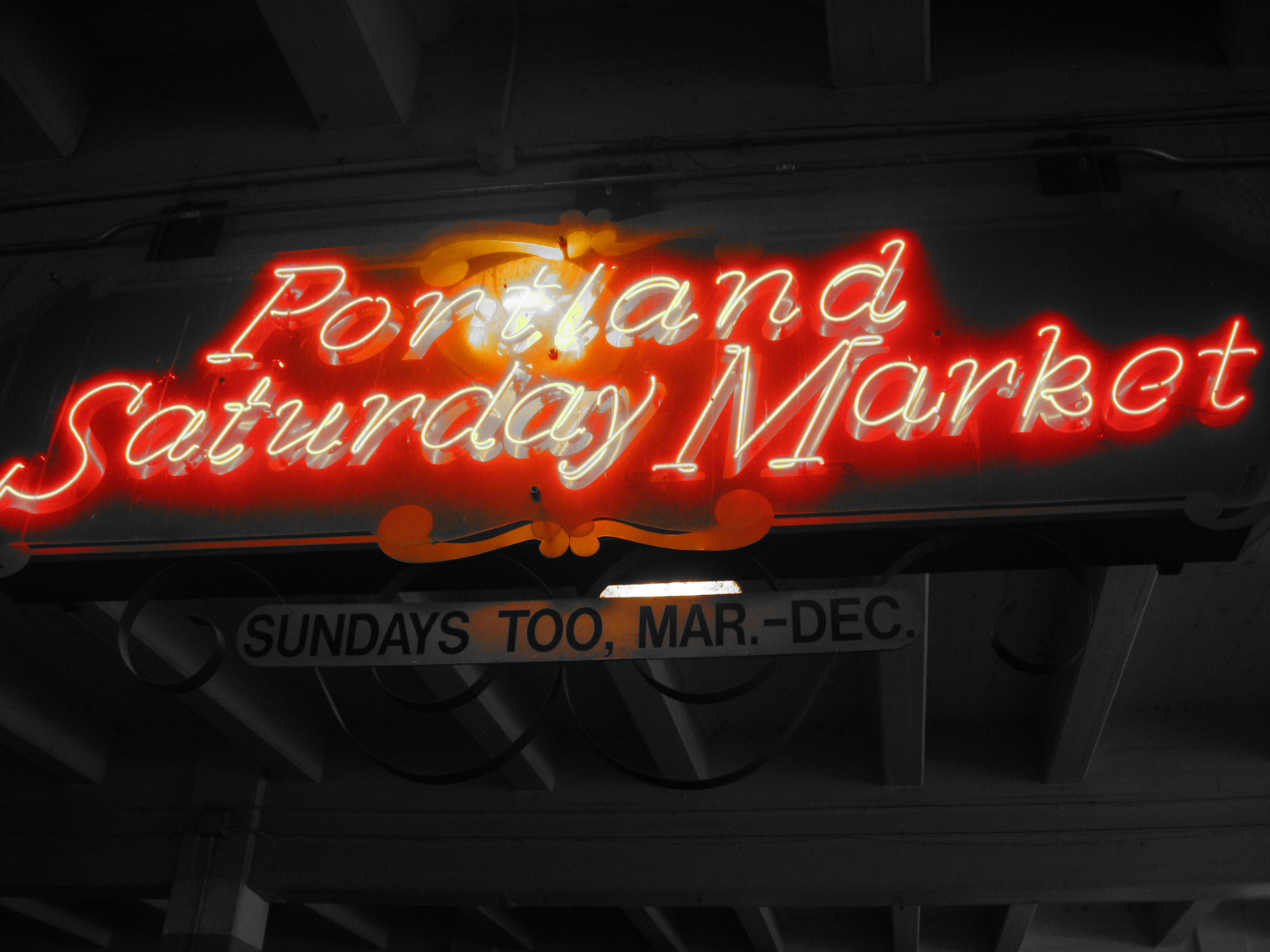
Portland Saturday Market sign (at the 1976–2009 location)

The recommendations from these studies eventually led to a plan which would move the market out of the space under the Burnside Bridge at First Avenue, to a new space one block east, in Tom McCall Waterfront Park, and include construction of an open-side shelter (called a "pavilion" by market representatives) to provide 8,000 square feet of semi-weather-protected space immediately south of the bridge. Ankeny Square, the small plaza located between the Skidmore Fountain and Naito Parkway, would continue to be used for vendor booths each weekend, in addition to the larger space to the east of Naito Parkway, within the park. The move would increase the number of craft-vendor spaces slightly, from 255 to 275. The intention was that Waterfront Park would lease the pavilion to the market on the weekends during the market season, while also leasing the area for other projects during the week. The project was overseen by the Portland Development Commission, who had recently concluded a three-year study on possible permanent locations. Also under the project's umbrella was an accommodation for the headquarters of Mercy Corps. At the beginning of the 2009 season, the new space was not ready for use, so the market opened temporarily at its old location.

In May 2009, Saturday Market moved into its new location in Waterfront Park. Ankeny Plaza, a relatively small portion of the market, was retained as part of the reconfigured market and is used by about 50 vendors each weekend. In August 2009, a new public fountain was brought into use next to the market's space, in the park at Ash Street, named the Bill Naito Legacy Fountain in honor of Portland businessman and civic leader Bill Naito, who had also been one of the Saturday Market's early supporters.

== Sundays ==
The Markets operated Sundays from 1977 to 2020, when the COVID-19 pandemic caused many older vendors to retire from the market. Both markets reopened Sundays for the 2024 year, though temporarily closed again for the 2025 year due to low customer turnout.

== See also ==
- Jade International Night Market
- My People's Market
- Portland Indigenous Marketplace
- Portland Night Market
