= Jade International Night Market =

Annual event in Portland, Oregon, U.S.

- Logo
- Status: Active
- Frequency: Annually
- Locations: Portland, Oregon, U.S.
- Country: United States
- Years active: 11–12

The Jade International Night Market is an annual night market in Portland, Oregon, United States. The event was established by the APANO Communities United Fund (previously known as the Asian Pacific American Network of Oregon) in 2014. According to Portland Monthly, the market "seeks to educate people about the issues impacting the changing neighborhood, celebrate the diversity and culture of its communities, and support small local businesses residing within". It highlights vendors from the city's Jade District.

The 2014 event was held in the parking lot of the Fubonn Shopping Center. Approximately 20,000 people attended over four weekends. Following a three-year hiatus, the 2023 event was held during the day, unlike past iterations. The event has also been held on the southeast Portland campus of Portland Community College.

== See also ==
- Culture of Portland, Oregon
- My People's Market
- Portland Indigenous Marketplace
- Portland Night Market
- Portland Saturday Market
