= Ankeny Plaza =

Square in Portland, Oregon, U.S.

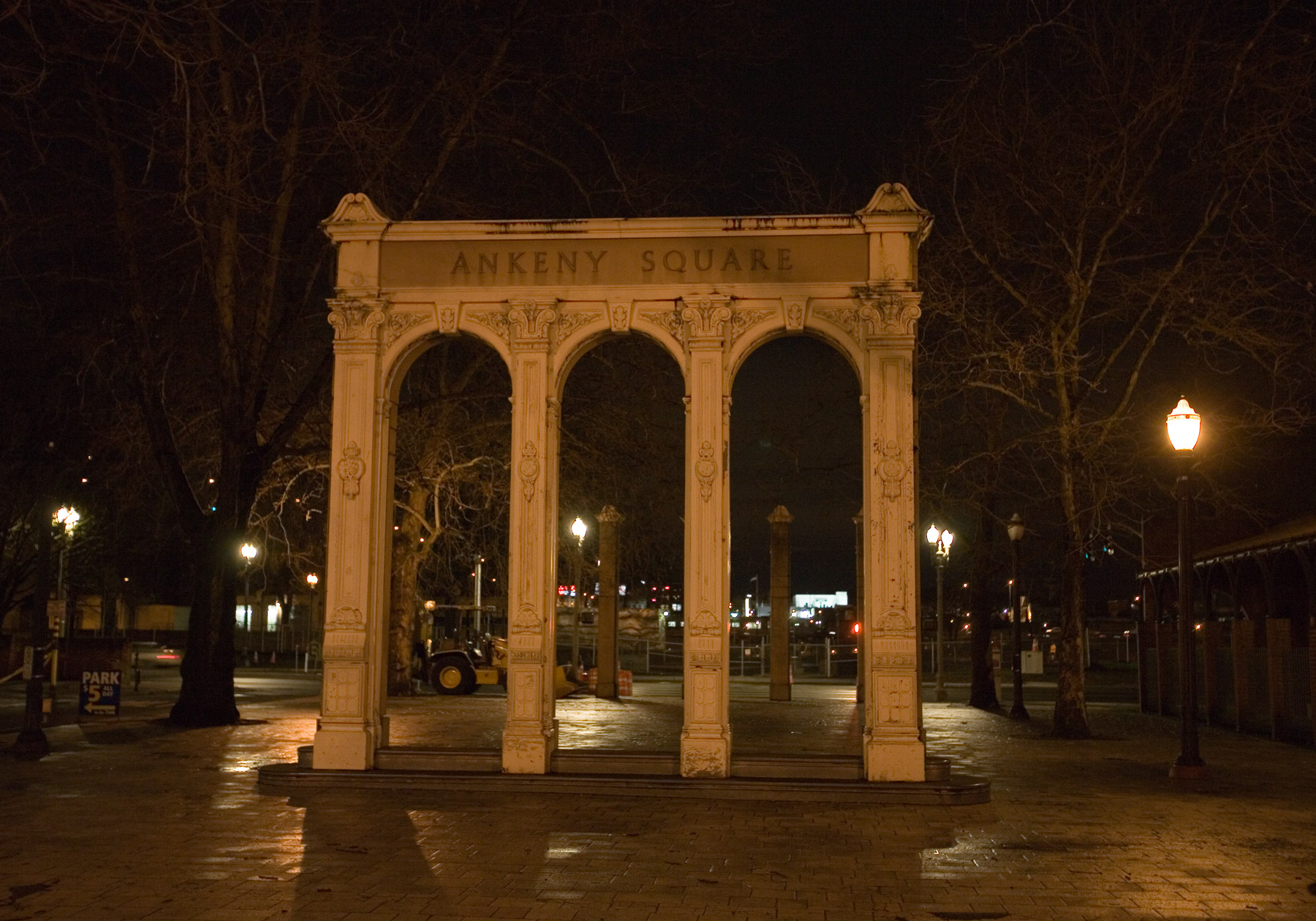
- The plaza at night, 2007

- Location within Portland, Oregon
- Location: Portland, Oregon, U.S.
- Coordinates: 45.52238°N 122.67079°W

Ankeny Plaza, is a historic square located at the intersection of Southwest Ankeny and Naito Parkway in Portland, Oregon's Old Town Chinatown neighborhood, in the United States. It contains Skidmore Fountain.

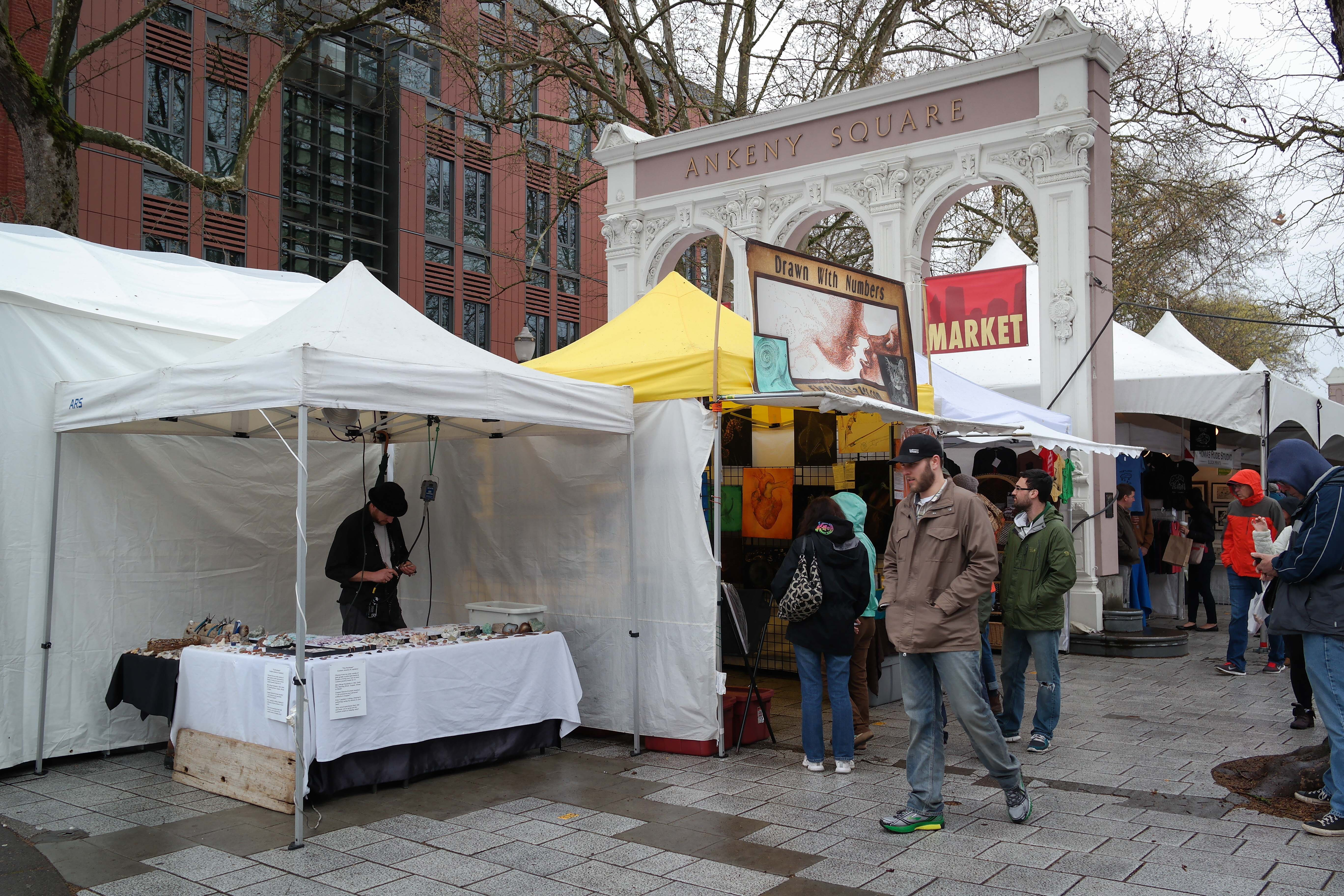
Portland Saturday Market in the plaza in 2014
