= Indigenous Peoples' Day in Portland, Oregon =

Annual community celebration

The holiday Indigenous Peoples' Day is celebrated annually in the American city of Portland, Oregon. Portland City Council unanimously passed a declaration designating the holiday in 2015. The resolution recognizes the "contributions of Native Americans in the Portland area", according to the Associated Press, and "celebrate[s] the Native people who have called this place home for centuries", according to The Oregonian. Portland and Corvallis were the first two cities in Oregon to recognize the holiday. The Indigenous Peoples Day of Rage occurred in Portland in 2020.

== Events and activities ==
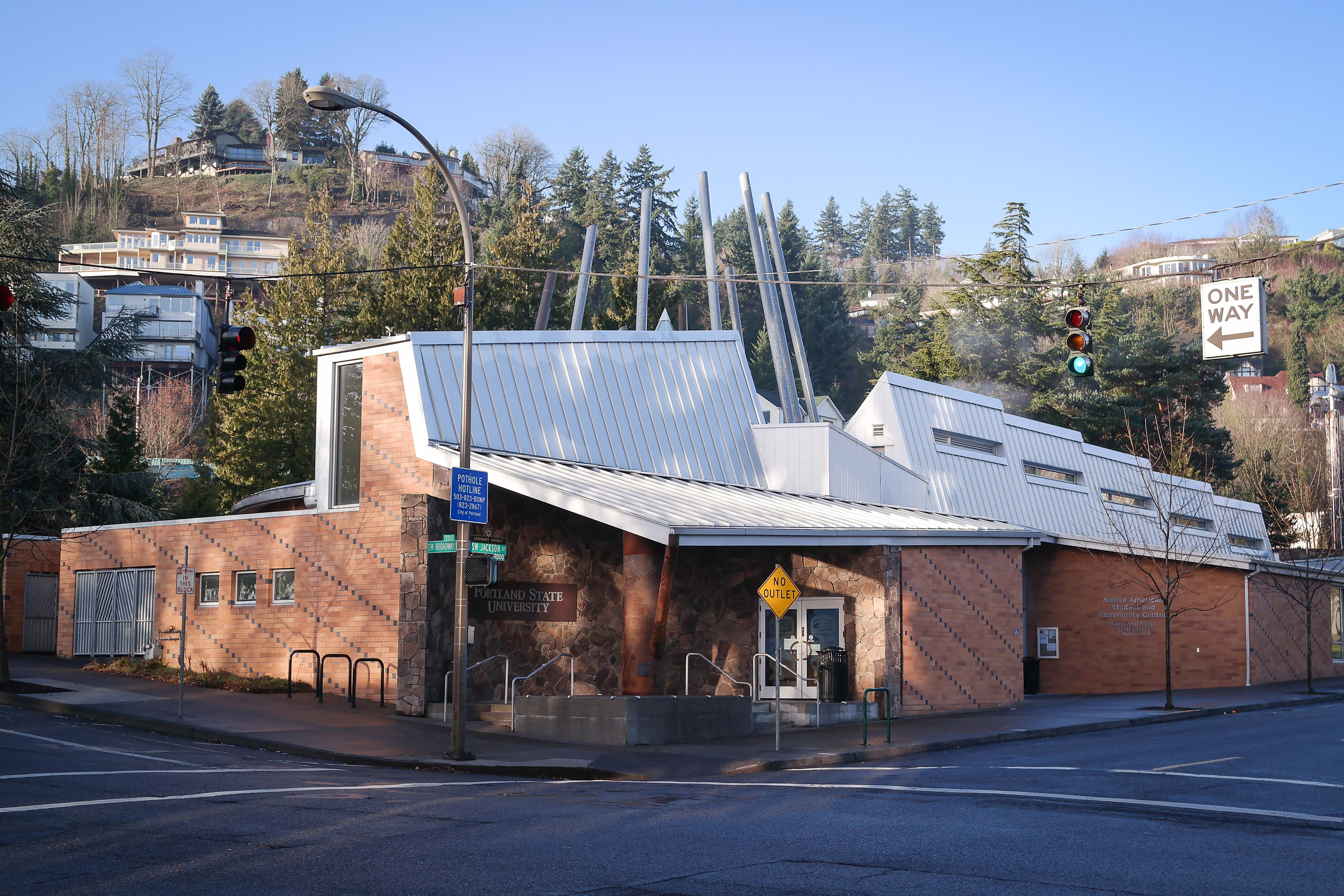
Portland State University's Native American Student and Community Center (exterior pictured in 2014) has hosted Indigenous Peoples' Day celebrations.

The city has seen various events and activities to commemorate the holiday. In 2018, the Great Spirit United Methodist Church hosted a celebration with food, music and speakers from the Cowlitz Indian Tribe. In 2020 and 2021, during the COVID-19 pandemic, the Portland Indigenous Marketplace (PIM) hosted virtual events.

In 2023, Portland State University's (PSU) Native American Student and Community Center (NASCC) hosted an event with Indigenous artists, craft vendors, and entrepreneurs. In 2023 and 2025, the Indigenous-led organization Future Generations Collaborative (FGC) hosted a celebration with food for 600 people at Barbie's Village in northeast Portland. The 2024 celebration at Barbie's Village was a collaboration between FGC and PIM. The NASCC and Native Theater Project hosted "We Are Sacred: An Indigenous Peoples Celebration", featuring live music and performances.

PIM's two-day celebration at the Oregon Convention Center in 2025, called "Weekend Marketplace and Electric Ride and Drive", featured performances by Indigenous artists including flutist Sherrie Davis and the drum group Turquoise Pride. The Indigenous Peoples Day Paddle at Broughton Beach Park was organized by the Portland Indigenous and Paddling Community. The presentation "Oregon Origins Project VII: wéetes waχ tim’íne (Earth + Heart)" was held at Reed College's Performing Arts Building. PIM hosted a conference with speakers and performances for the holiday in 2026.

== Closures ==
Since Indigenous Peoples' Day shares a date with Columbus Day, which is a federally recognized holiday, banks and post offices are often closed. The local Native American Youth and Family Center has closed for the holiday.

Portland City Council has considered making Indigenous Peoples' Day a paid holiday for city employees.

== See also ==
- Culture of Portland, Oregon
- Indigenous peoples of the Pacific Northwest Coast
- Native American peoples of Oregon
  - List of federally recognized Native American tribes in Oregon
