= My People's Market =

Series of marketplaces in Portland, Oregon, U.S.

- Logo

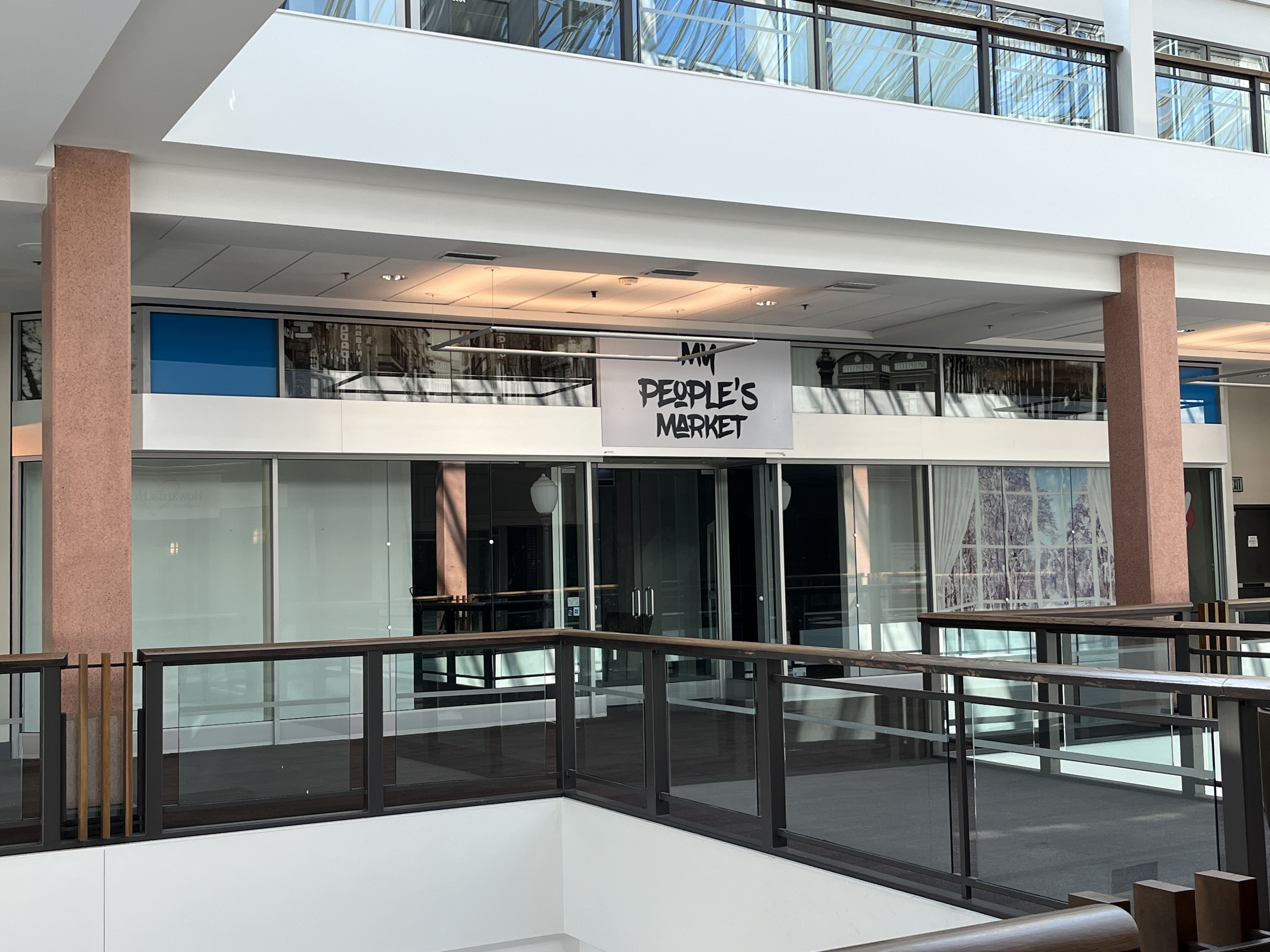
- My People's Market at the Lloyd Center, September 2025
- Status: Active
- Locations: Portland, Oregon, U.S.
- Country: United States
- Years active: 9

My People's Market is a series of temporary marketplaces in Portland, Oregon, United States, focusing on businesses owned by people of color.

== History ==
The first event was held in 2017. It was founded by Amanda Park, Tamara Kennedy-Hill, Michelle Comer, and Tory Campbell, and hosted by Prosper Portland and Travel Oregon. The 2019 event was sponsored by New Seasons Market. The 2020 event was "re-imagined" because of the COVID-19 pandemic. Santé Bar hosted the market's beer garden in 2021. The 2024 event was held at Redd on Salmon Street.

My People's Market has also operated at the Lloyd Center.

== See also ==
- Culture of Portland, Oregon
- Jade International Night Market
- Portland Indigenous Marketplace
- Portland Night Market
- Portland Saturday Market
