= Santé Bar =

Bar in Portland, Oregon, U.S.

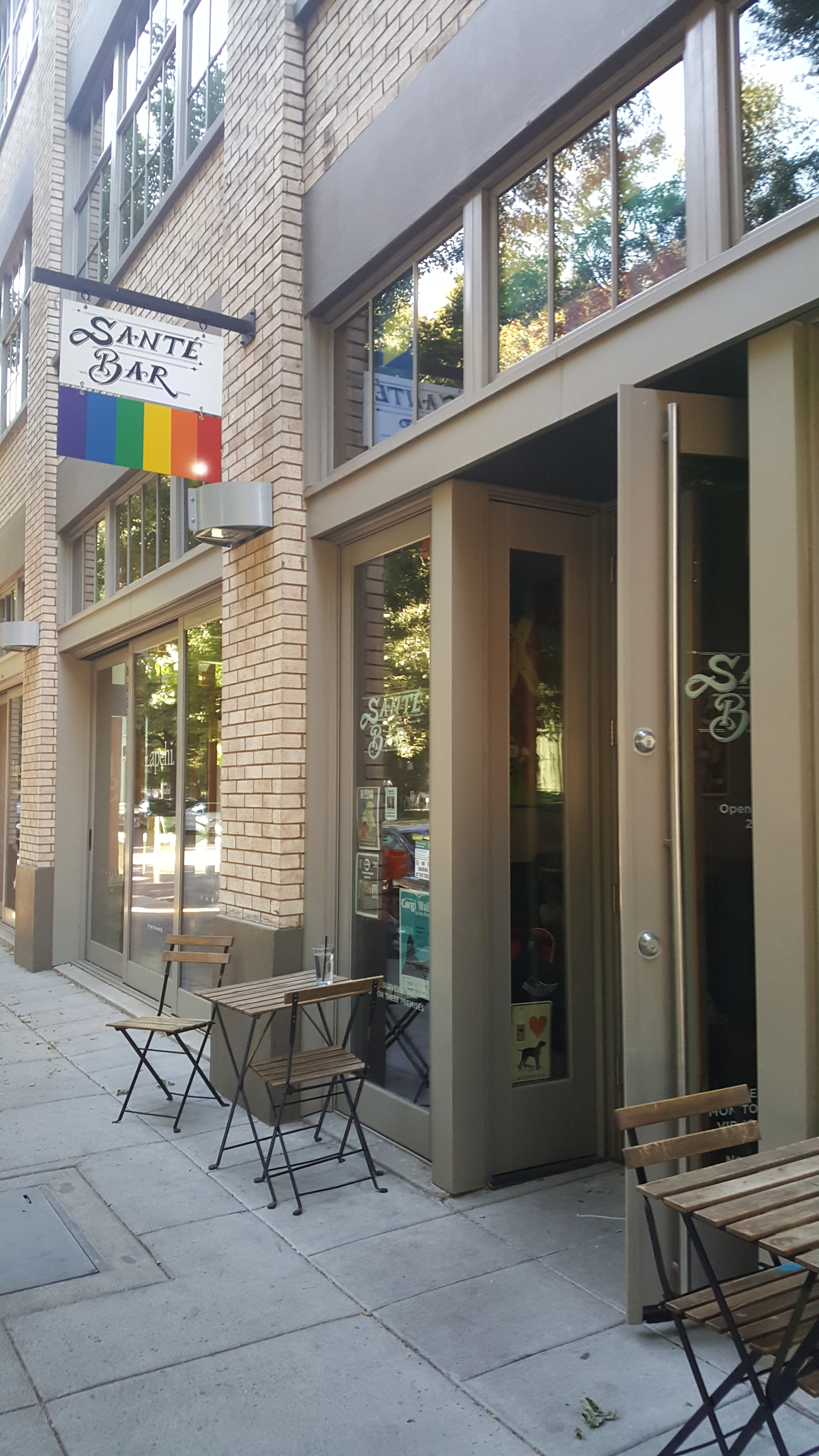
- The venue's exterior in 2019
- Interactive map of Santé Bar

Restaurant information
- Owner: Veronique Lafont
- Location: 411 Northwest Park Avenue, Portland, Multnomah, Oregon, 97209, United States
- Coordinates: 45.5261°N 122.6793°W

Santé Bar was an LGBTQ-friendly bar in Portland, Oregon, United States.

== Description ==
Santé Bar was an LGBTQ-friendly bar along the North Park Blocks in northwest Portland's Pearl District. The business was owned by Veronique Lafont, a queer Black woman. Eater Portland's Brooke Jackson-Glidden said the bar was "known for its highballs and pretty cocktails served in coupes, ideal for a sunny day".

In a 2021 overview of the city's "wildest" gay bars, she and Conner Reed described Santé as a "narrow, elegant space" with "solid" drinks, and the website's Alex Frane called the bar "cozy and low-key" in a list of "essential Portland cocktail bars where you can sip something exceptional". In 2020, Frane described Santé as an LGBTQ bar with "elegant" cocktails.

In his 2019 overview of the city's "best in LGBTQ+ nightlife, bars, parties, comedy, and more", the Portland Mercury's Andrew Jankowski described Santé as a piano bar "serving cocktails, live jazz, TV musical viewing parties, and open mics with everything from storytelling and poetry to live, music".

== History ==
The bar was burglarized in 2018. In 2021, Santé Bar hosted a beer garden during My People's Market.

== Reception ==
In 2019, Willamette Week said, "This swanky cocktail bar might not look like much from the outside, but its vintage vibe, romantic lighting and fancy drinks are a welcome shift from the standard westside LGBTQ bar experience." Kara Stokes and Maya MacEvoy included Santé Bar in Eater Portland's 2022 overview of "Where to Eat and Drink in Portland’s Pearl District".

== See also ==
- LGBTQ-owned business
- List of Black-owned restaurants
- List of defunct restaurants of the United States
- List of LGBTQ bars
- Woman-owned business
