= Pip's Original Doughnuts & Chai =

Doughnut shop in Portland, Oregon, U.S.

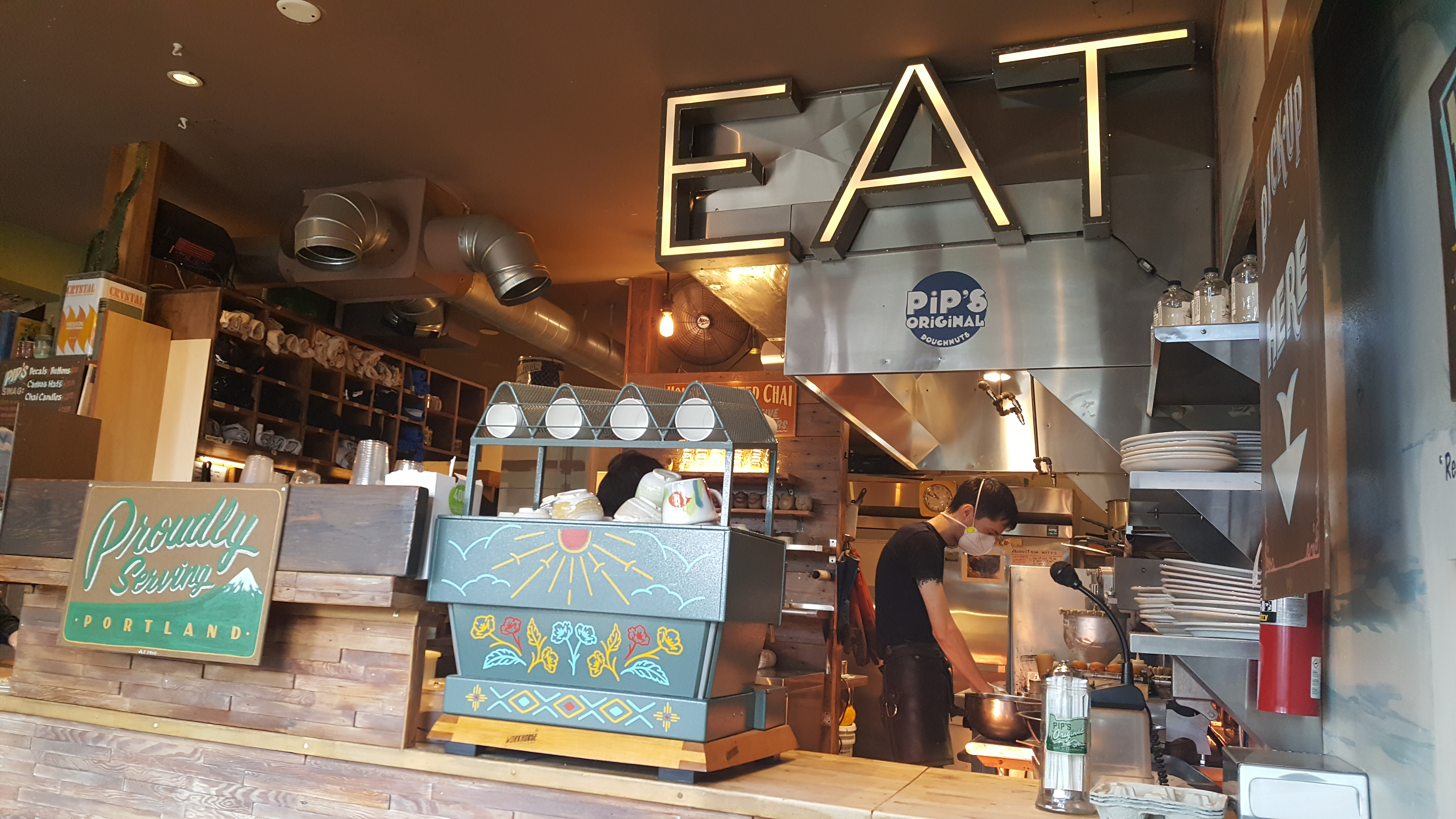
- Interior counter, 2022
- Interactive map of Pip's Original Doughnuts & Chai

Restaurant information
- Location: 4759 Northeast Fremont Street, Portland, Oregon, 97213, United States
- Coordinates: 45.5484°N 122.6138°W

Pip's Original Doughnuts & Chai, or simply Pip's Original, is a doughnut shop in Portland, Oregon, United States. The business operates in northeast Portland, and previously operated a second location in Beaverton. Nate Snell is a co-owner. The business has garnered a positive reception.

== Description ==
Pip's is a doughnut shop on Fremont Street in northeast Portland. Previously, a second location operated in Beaverton during 2023–2024. Vogue has said the Portland shop has an "always out-the-door line".

== History ==
In 2016, a job posting for the business upset some local vegetarians and vegans. In 2017, Pip's gave away doughnuts to benefit the Immigrant and Refugee Community Organization.

A driver crashed into the Portland shop in 2019. During the COVID-19 pandemic, when indoor seating was banned, Pip's focused on chai.

In 2023, owners announced plans to open a second location in Beaverton. The outpost closed in December 2024.

Pip's gives a dozen small doughnuts to people celebrating their birthday, as of 2020. The business has been a vendor at the Portland Night Market.

== Reception ==
KGW included Pip's in a 2019 list of the five "top spots" for doughnuts in the city, describing the shop as "the most popular doughnut spot in Portland, boasting 4.5 stars out of 2,141 reviews on Yelp". Similarly, KOIN included the business in a 2019 list of doughnut shops and called the small doughnuts "a Portland favorite". Zoe Baillargeon included Pip's in Portland Monthly's 2021 list of the city's ten best chais. Writers for Portland Monthly included the doughnuts and chai in a 2025 list of the city's "most iconic" dishes.

Nick Townsend included Pip's in Eater Portland's 2021 list of eleven restaurants with "charming" chai lattes in the city. Townsend and Brooke Jackson-Glidden also included Pip's in a 2021 overview of Portland's "standout" doughnut shops", and Jackson-Glidden included the doughnuts in a 2024 overview of "iconic" Portland dishes. Alex Frane named Pip's in Thrillist's 2021 overview of the city's "absolute best" doughnut shops.

Pip's ranked second and won in the Best Donut category of Willamette Week's annual 'Best of Portland' readers' poll in 2022 and 2024, respectively. The business ranked number 15 in Yelp's top 100 list of doughnut shops in 2023.

== See also ==
- List of doughnut shops
- List of restaurant chains in the United States
