= Mochi donut =

Type of doughnut

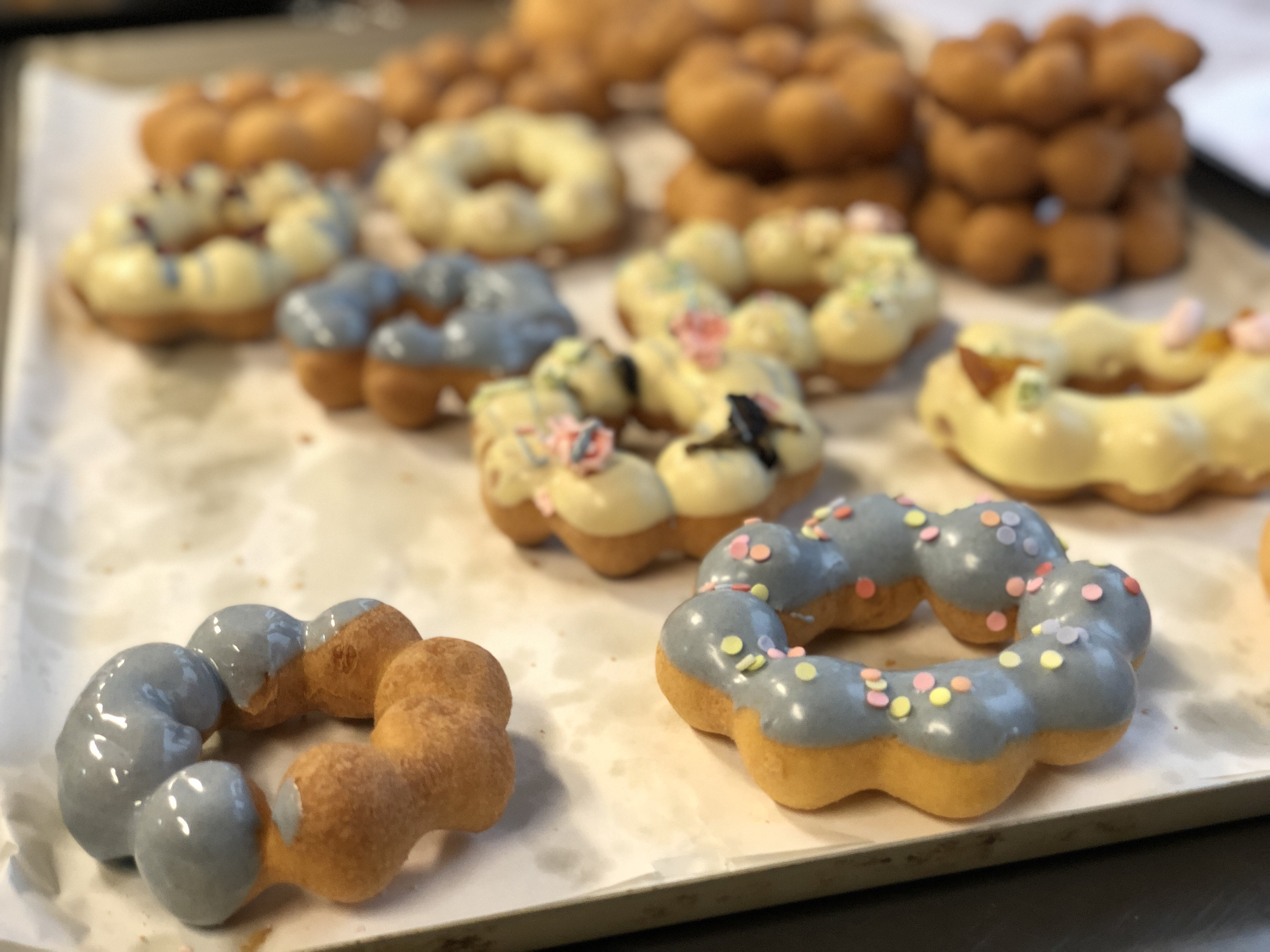
- Glazed mochi donuts
- Type: Fried dough
- Course: Breakfast, snack, dessert
- Place of origin: Hawaii (United States), Japan
- Main ingredients: Tapioca flour, rice flour

Mochi donuts, also known as poi mochi, are a fusion crossing traditional American-style doughnuts and Japanese mochi. Mochi donuts are commonly formed into a circular shape, consisting of eight small balls that are easy to pull apart. They are made out of glutinous rice flour or tapioca flour. The batter mix makes them fluffy, moist and chewy.

An early iteration can be traced back to Hawaii in the early 1990s, and mochi donuts were popularized by Mister Donut's "Pon de Ring" in the early 2000s.

== History and origins ==
One of the earliest iterations of mochi donuts can be traced to the development of "poi mochi" by Charmaine Ocasek in Hawaii in 1992. This iteration is a fusion of American donuts and Japanese mochi and "consisted of deep-fried balls of mashed taro and mochiko, a Japanese short-grain sweet rice flour".

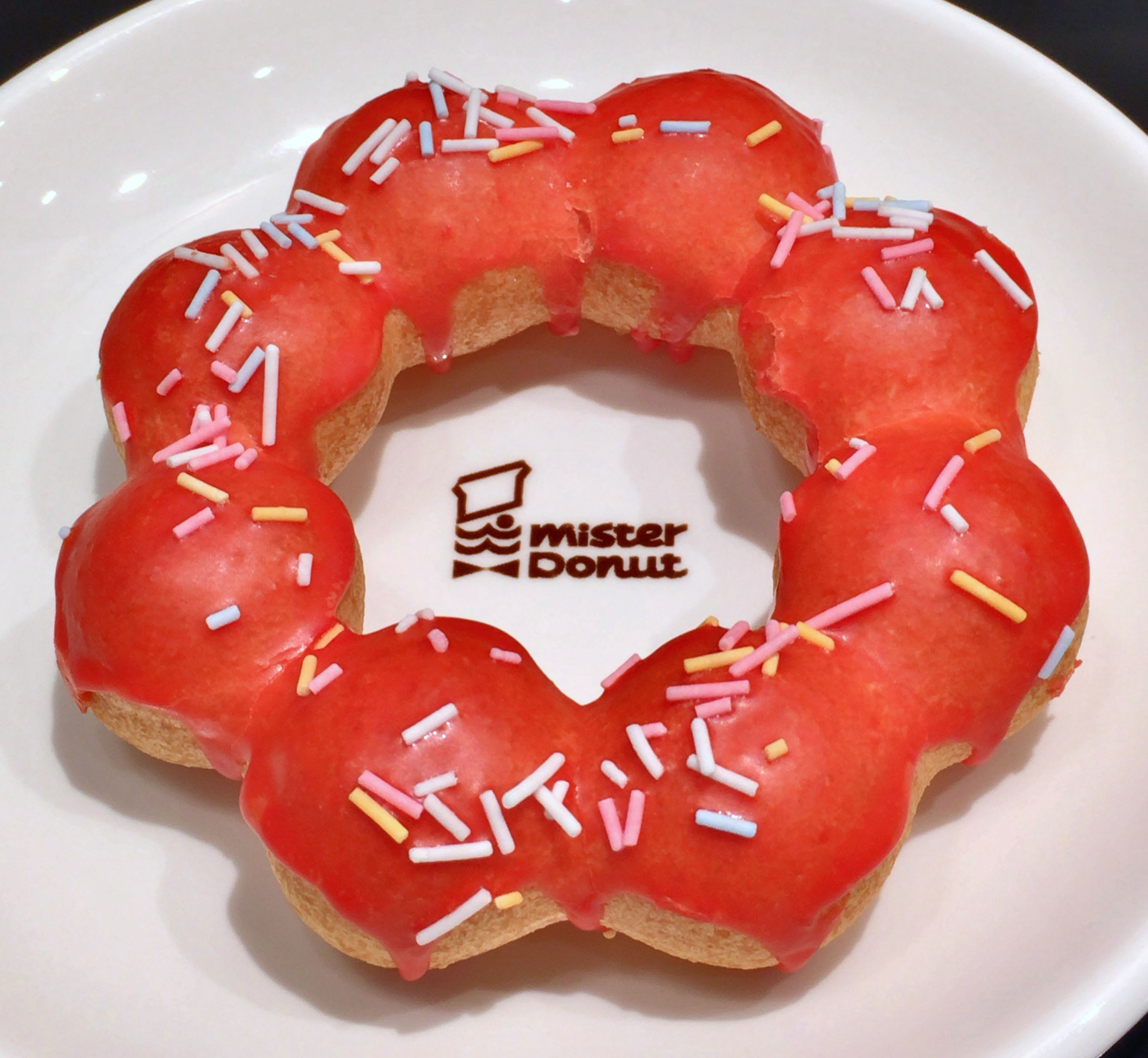
Strawberry flavor mochi donut by Mister Donut

In 2003, the Japanese donut chain Mister Donut launched pon de ring (ポン・デ・リング, Pon De Ringu), named after the Brazilian pão de queijo bread. This iteration of the hybrid confection was popularized in Japan before spreading to the United States via Hawaii. Hawaii "tends to catch on to Japanese food trends before the rest of the [United States], thanks to its larger population of Japanese-Americans and closer proximity to Japan". The "pon de ring" style is shaped into a ring of eight connected small balls. On calling the pon de ring style a mochi donut, Epicurious stated: "oddly enough, neither pon de ring or pão de queijo are made with glutinous rice flour. Both typically use tapioca flour, and while pão de queijo is gluten-free, most recipes for pon de ring also include wheat flour. [...] Some folks suggest the name has less to do with the glutinous rice flour that we often associate with foods called mochi and more to do with the phrase mochi-mochi, which describes a uniquely soft but elastic or even bouncy texture".

== Modern preparation ==
Mister Donut uses tapioca flour to produce mochi donuts that are easy to pull apart. Another variation developed in the United States uses glutinous rice flour which produces a denser mochi donut akin to Hawaiian-style butter mochi. Mochi donuts made from glutinous rice flour "typically contain half the amount of calories as the standard cake or yeast doughnut". The Takeout noted that "mochi doughnuts have a crispy exterior, due to being fried or baked, and a chewy interior thanks to the use of" mochiko sweet rice flour and that "some recipes are gluten free, since they use rice or tapioca flour rather than the conventional wheat variety".

=== Equipment ===
Although mochi donuts can be made by hand, most bakeries use machines that mold the dough into the traditional ring shapes and drop them directly into the oil for more efficiency.

=== Variations ===
Mochi donuts can be found in various flavors and colors. Similar to "regular donuts, mochi donuts typically feature classic, buttery vanilla dough". Glazes that feature "Japanese flavors like matcha, pandan, and ube are common". Mochi donuts are often found garnished with different toppings such as chocolate chips, sesame seeds, grilled coconut chips, fresh or candied fruit, matcha powder, or cinnamon sugar.

Mister Donut offers seasonal-themed variations with various glazes such as strawberry; they also offer a version made from chocolate dough and version that is cream filled.

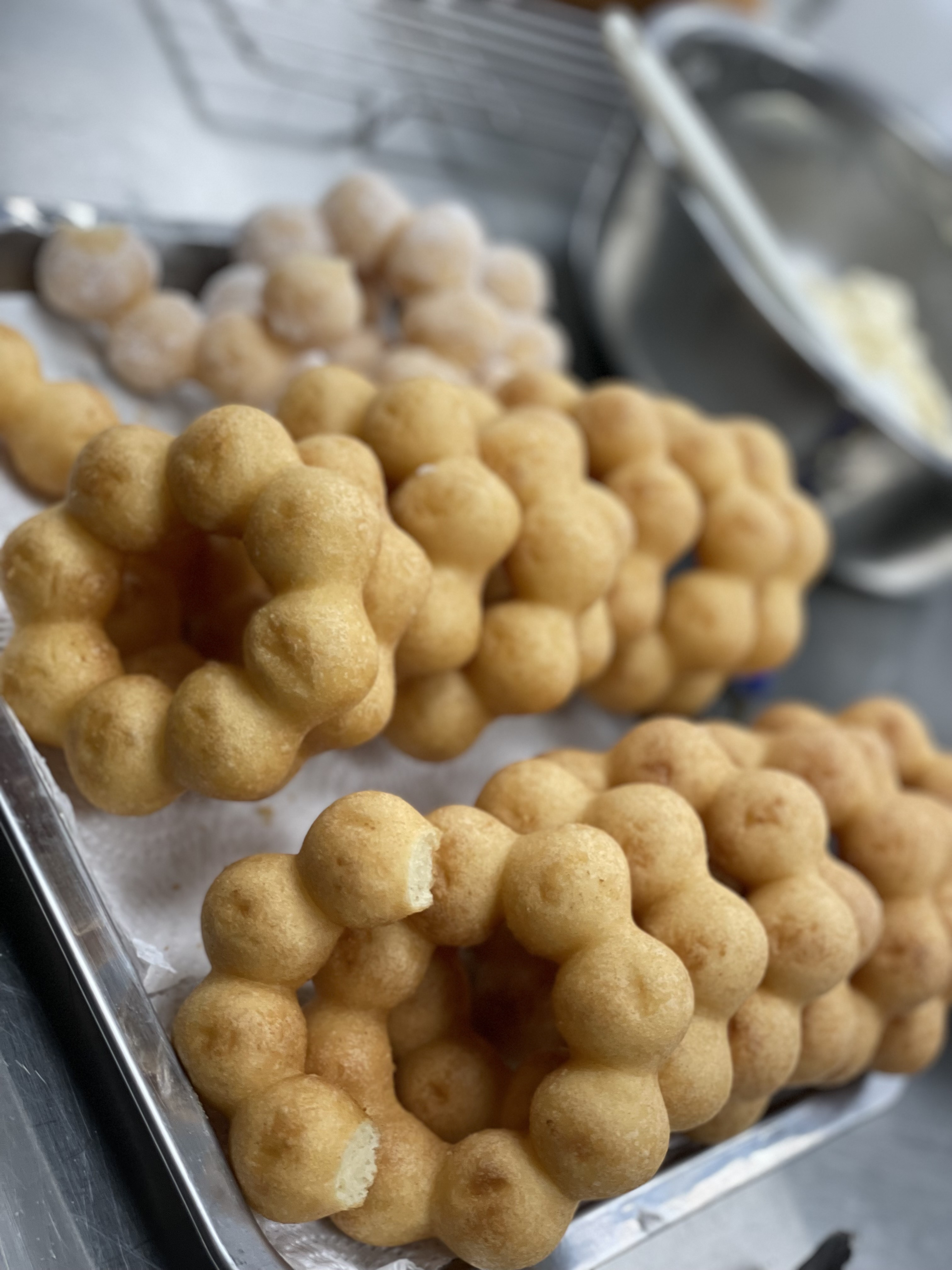
Plain mochi donuts

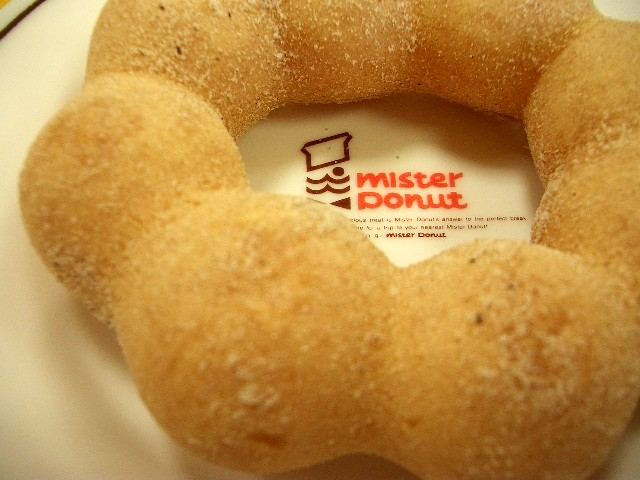
Mochi donut with brown sugar

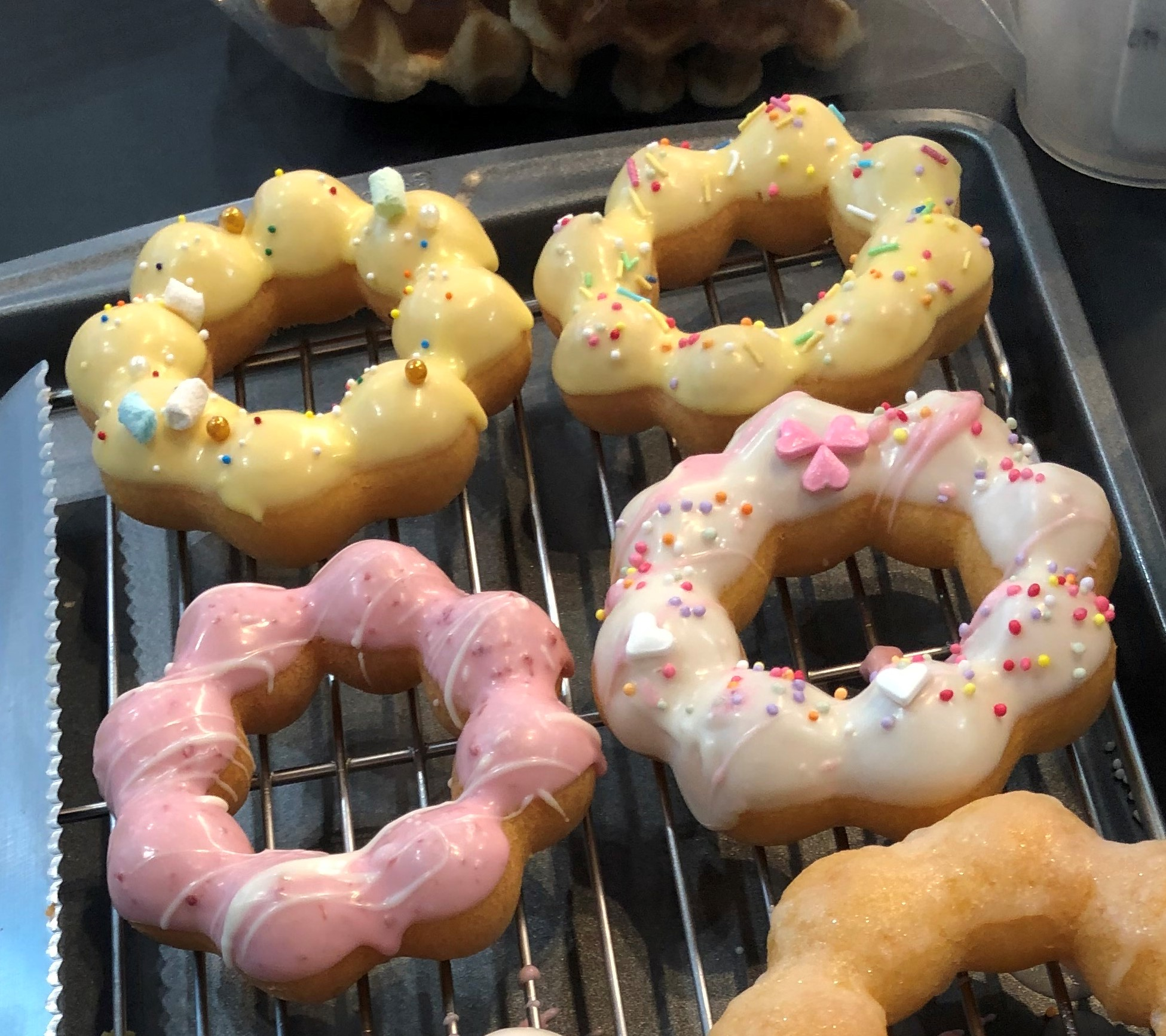
Glazed mochi donuts

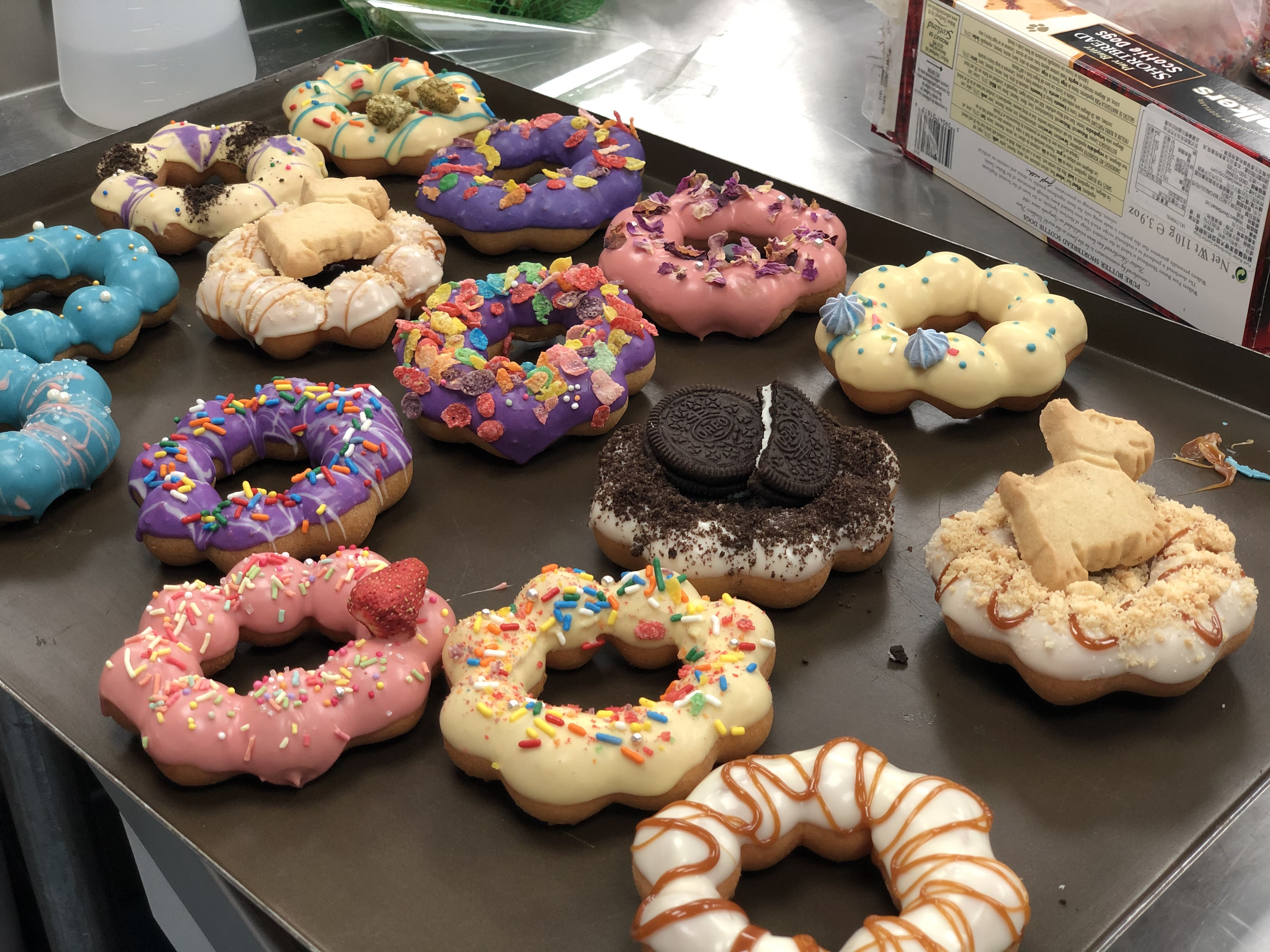
Decorated mochi donuts

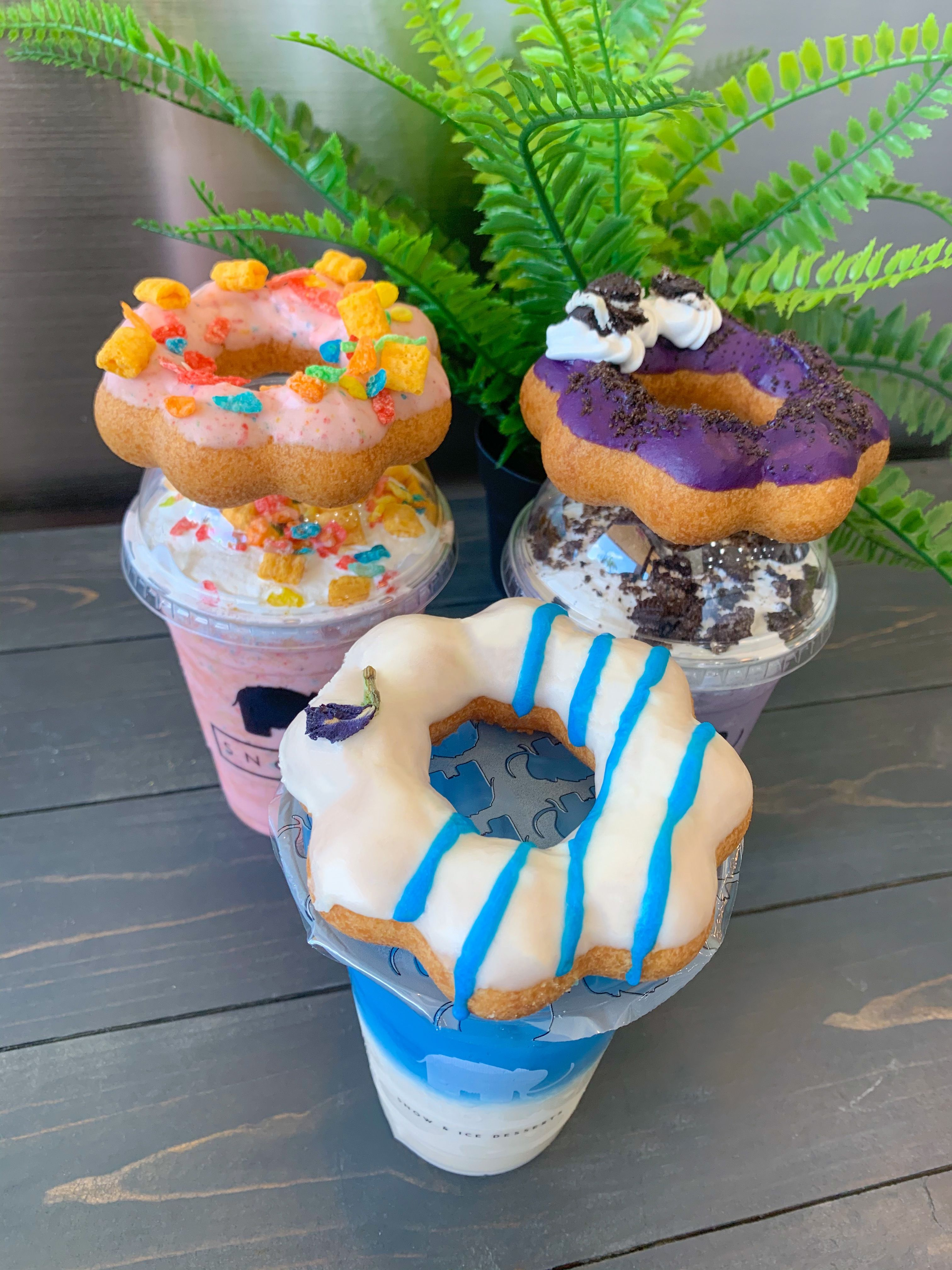
Decorated mochi donuts made in San Diego County

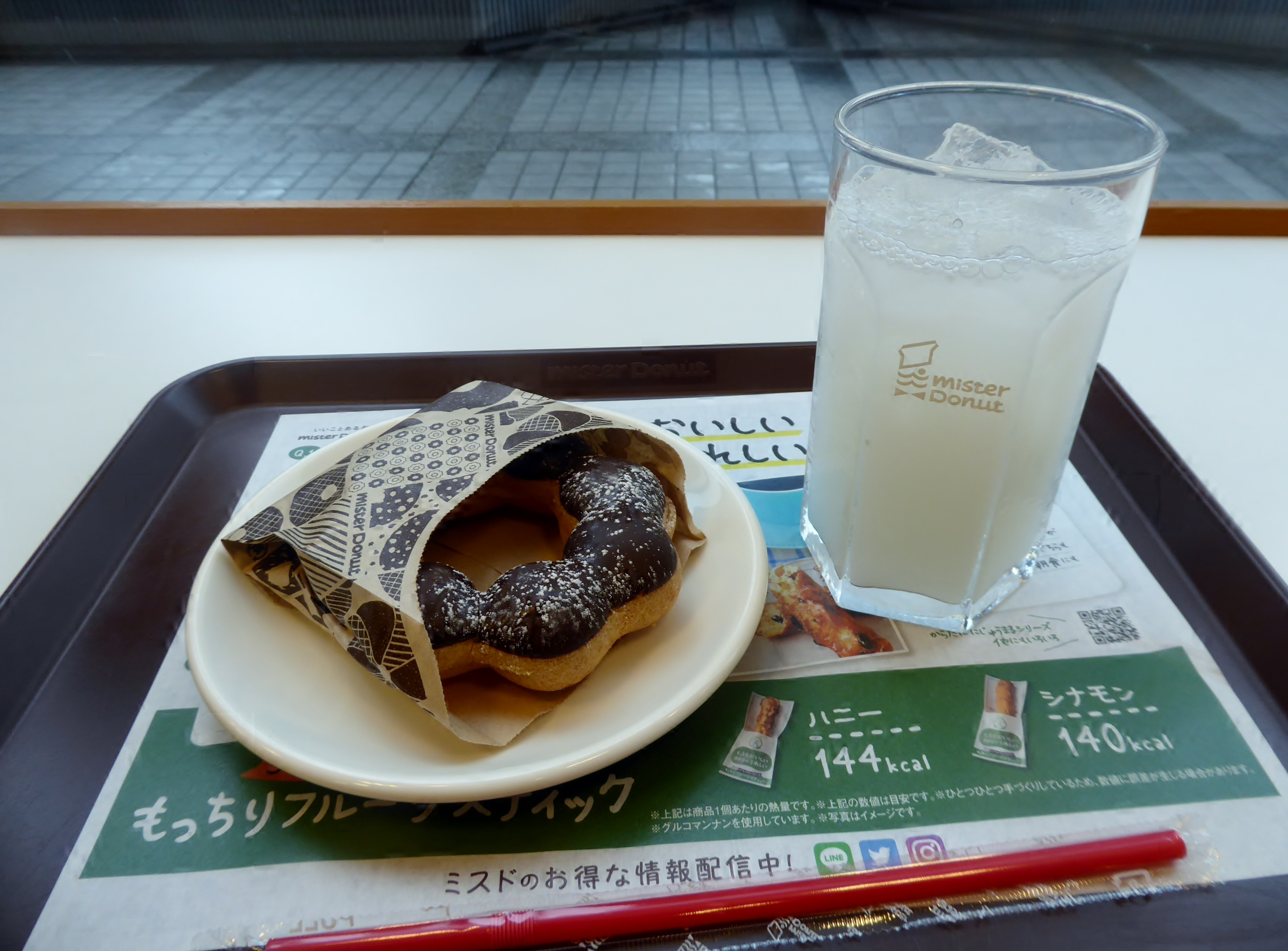
Mister Donut's "Pon de Eclair" variation with Calpis soft drink

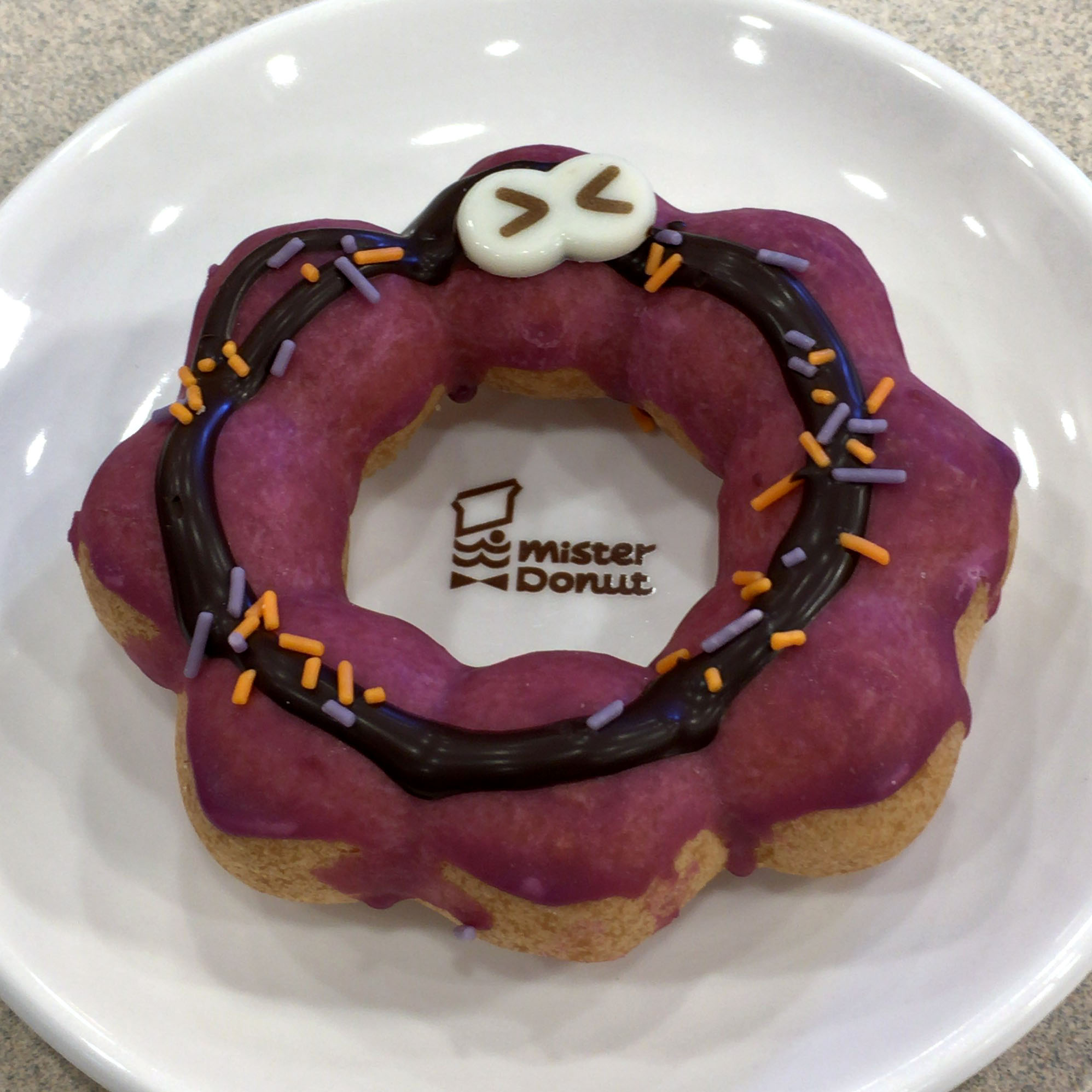
Mister Donut seasonal "purple wolf ring"

== Popularity ==
Originally popular in Asia, mochi donuts rapidly gained popularity across the United States in recent years with the help of social media. Mochi donuts' bright colors and playful shape, which is reminiscent of a flower or a bracelet, make them particularly photogenic.

== See also ==
- Bober Tea and Mochi Dough
- List of doughnut varieties
