= Native American Student and Community Center =

Building at Portland State University in Oregon, U.S.

Coordinates: 45°30′33.6″N 122°41′8.3″W

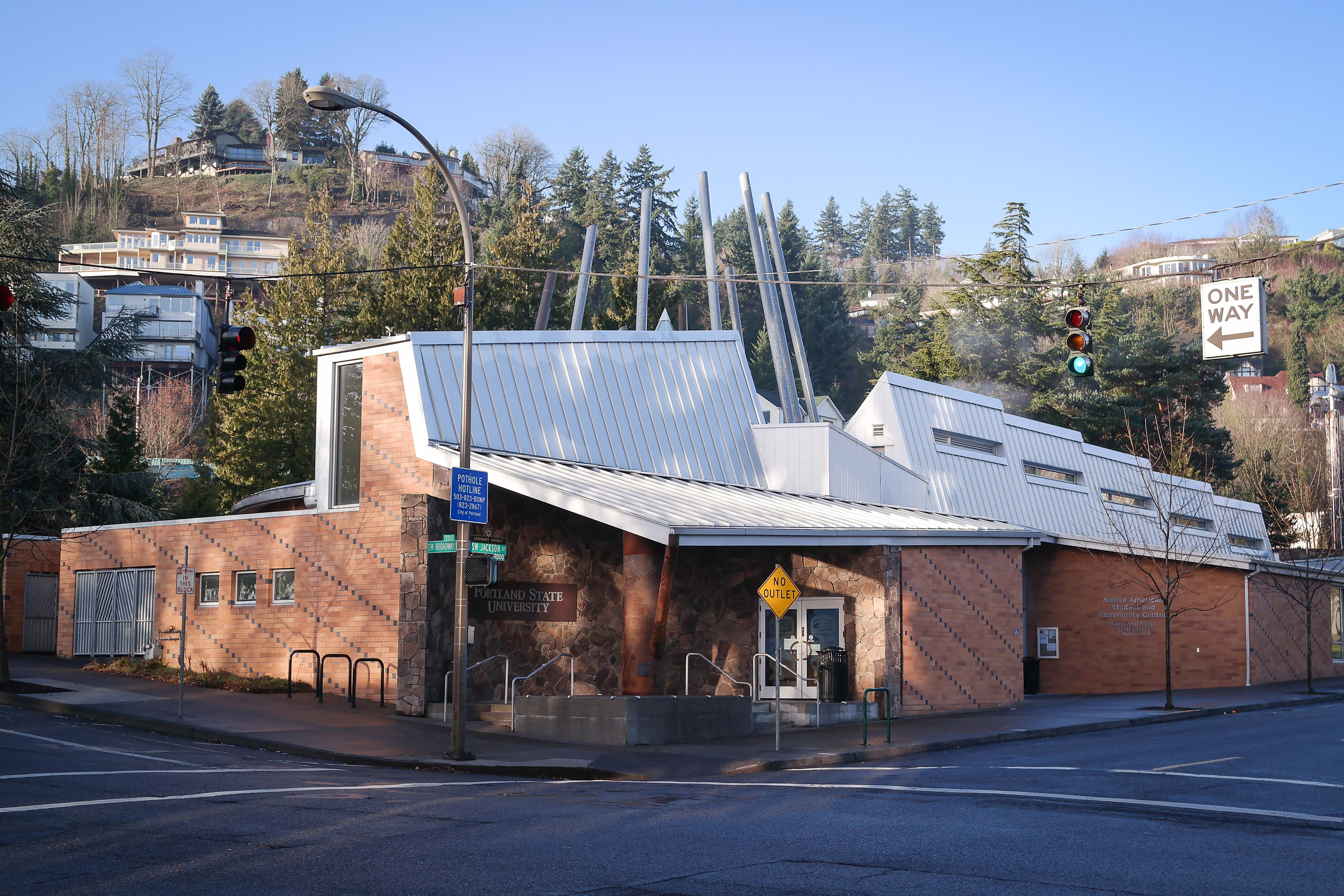
- Interactive map of the Native American Student and Community Center area

General information
- Location: Portland, Oregon, U.S.

Website
- pdx.edu/native-american-center

The Native American Student and Community Center is part of the campus of Portland State University in Portland, Oregon, United States. It opened in 2003, functioning as a services center for Native American students and a community center for Native residents.

== History ==
Organization for the creation of a Native American center in Portland, Oregon, began in the 1990s. Portland State University (PSU) students collected 3,000 signatures supporting the construction of a building. Planning began in 1996, when a feasibility study was conducted, and consultations were held with PSU students and faculty.

The design underwent four iterations before beginning construction with a budget of $4.5 million. Nearly 5,000 miscellaneous items dating to the 19th century were unearthed on the site during the process. The opening ceremony on October 24, 2003, was attended by over 600 people, including eight tribal leaders.

The building functions as both a services center for Native American students at PSU and a community center for other Native residents or visiting elders, an atypicality among Native spaces in the United States. The center hosts events, including powwows and outreach during Native American Heritage Month. It also houses a collection of Native art valued at $500,000.

An adjacent street was renamed after Rose Hill, a local community leader, in 2025. Over 2,600 local residents signed a petition in support of the action. Representatives from the center had long advocated for the change; the street had previously been named after President Andrew Jackson, who had signed the 1830 Indian Removal Act that caused the deportation of nearly 50,000 Native Americans from their home territories.

== Design ==
The center was designed by StastnyBrun Architects. As over 100 Native tribes were represented in the Portland metropolitan area, the architects considered "universals" in the design, including circles and poles evoking the construction of tipis. The 11,700-square-foot (1,090 m^{2}) building includes a gallery, a classroom, an amphitheater, and storytelling spaces named in various Native languages. The 7,000-square-foot (650 m^{2}) green roof, created as a continuation of the neighboring South Park Blocks, grows various plants of importance to tribes in Eastern Oregon.

== See also ==
- Indigenous Peoples' Day in Portland, Oregon
- List of federally recognized Native American tribes in Oregon
- Native American peoples of Oregon
