= SuperBite =

Defunct New American restaurant in Portland, Oregon, U.S.

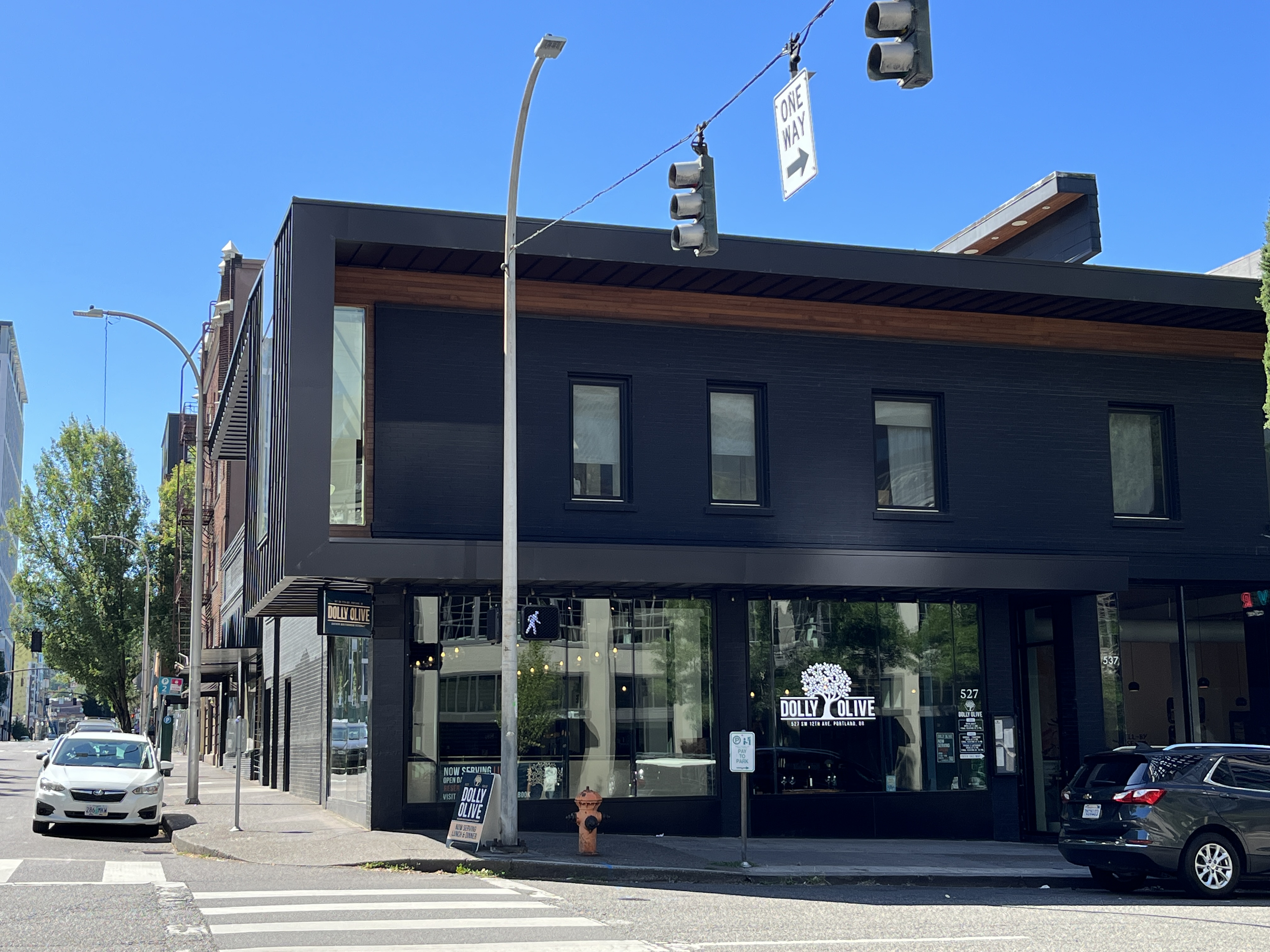
- 2023 photograph of the exterior of Dolly Olive, which operates in the building that previously housed SuperBite
- Interactive map of SuperBite

Restaurant information
- Food type: New American
- Location: Portland, Multnomah, Oregon, United States
- Coordinates: 45.5214°N 122.6842°W

SuperBite (sometimes Superbite) was a New American restaurant in Portland, Oregon, United States. It operated from April 2016 to December 31, 2017.

== Description ==
The New American restaurant SuperBite operated in downtown Portland, serving small plates (or "super bites"). The menu included a burger, Dungeness crab, egg noodles, onion rings, salmon ceviche, and fried trout over potato purée with a black bean sauce. Michael Russell of The Oregonian called the restaurant "experimental".

== History ==
SuperBite opened in April 2016, in the space that previously housed Grüner. SuperBite launched happy hour in 2017. That same year, sous-chef Nikko Marquez replaced Cory Rom as chef de cuisine. In November, the owners announced plans to close SuperBite after service on New Year's Eve (December 31) in order to open Bistro Agnes in the same space.

== Reception ==
In 2016, SuperBite was named reader's choice in the Best Restaurant category of Eater Portland's annual Eater Awards. Chef-owners Greg Denton and Gabi Quiñónez Denton were also nominated in the Chef of the Year category, and SuperBite was also named editor's choice in the Restaurant Spin-off of the Year category.

== See also ==
- List of New American restaurants
