= Bistro Agnes =

Defunct French restaurant in Portland, Oregon, US

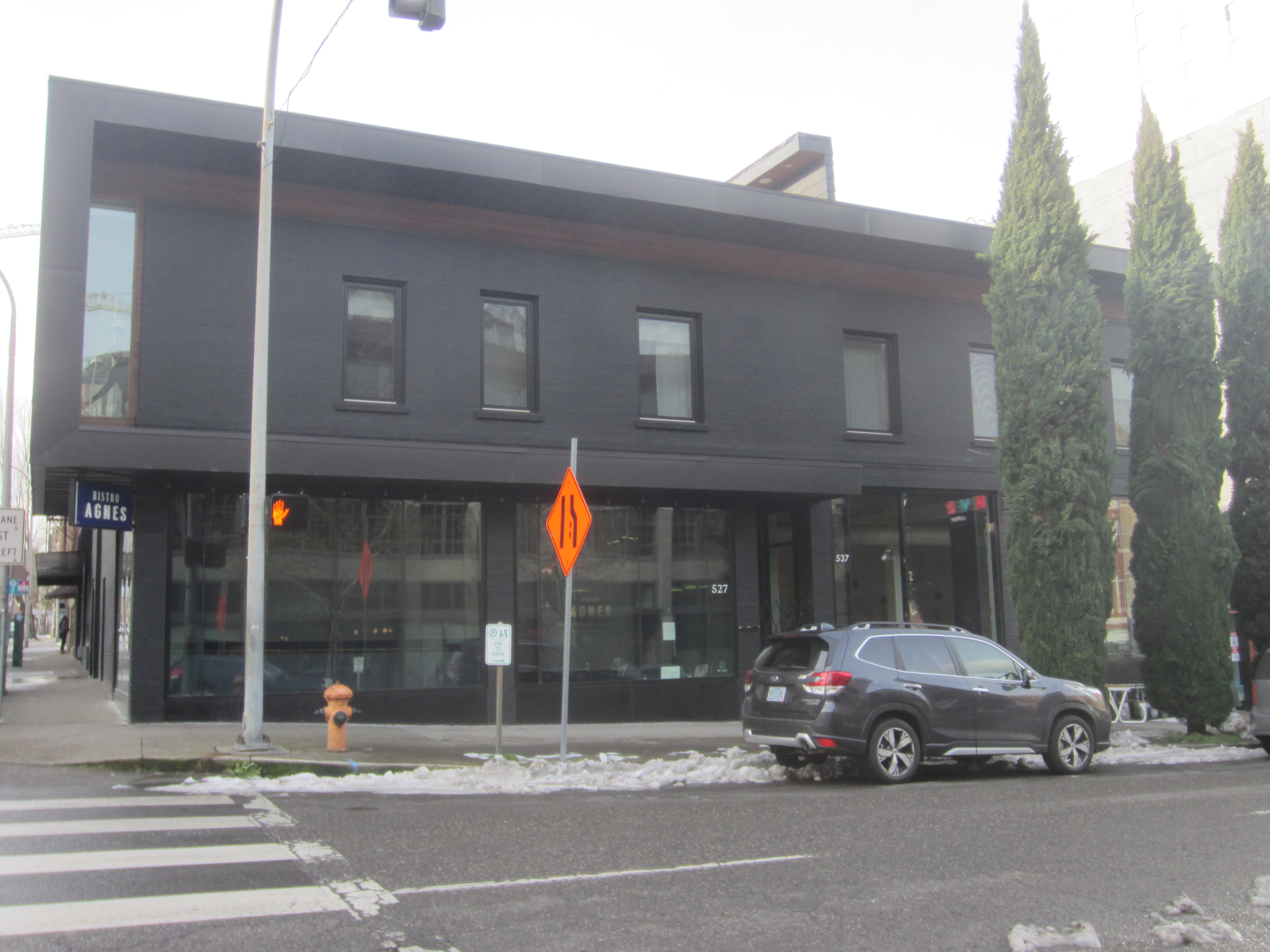
- The restaurant's exterior, 2021
- Interactive map of Bistro Agnes

Restaurant information
- Established: January 18, 2018
- Closed: January 2022
- Owners: Greg Denton; Gabrielle Quiñónez Denton
- Manager: Beau Burtnick
- Chef: Greg Denton; Gabrielle Quiñónez Denton; Chase Dopson
- Food type: French
- Location: 527 Southwest 12th Avenue, Portland, Multnomah, Oregon, 97205, United States
- Coordinates: 45.5214°N 122.6840°W
- Website: bistroagnes.com

Bistro Agnes was a French restaurant in Portland, Oregon, United States. Owned by chefs Greg Denton and Gabrielle Quiñónez Denton, the brasserie opened in downtown Portland in January 2018, being described as a "spin-off" of local steakhouse Ox, which was also owned by the Dentons. Bistro Agnes was affiliated with the restaurant group ChefStable, and Chase Dopson was also a chef. It garnered a positive reception and was deemed one of the city's best restaurants by The Oregonian and Condé Nast Traveler. After temporarily closing during the COVID-19 pandemic, the owners confirmed in January 2022 that the closure would be permanent.

== Description ==
Bistro Agnes operated at the intersection of Southwest 12th Avenue and Alder Street in downtown Portland's West End, and was described as a "classic Paris bistro" and a "French comfort food" eatery. The interior had blue walls, brass railings, mirrors, and vintage French posters. Eater Portland's Tim Forster called the restaurant a "French-style brasserie" with cassoulet and chicken liver mousse, and a cheeseburger with Bordelaise sauce, which is a French-American crossover dish.

The menu included French cuisine such as mussels marinière, ratatouille, a cassoulet with slow-cooked duck, roasted pork belly, toulouse sausage, coq au vin with wild mushrooms, foie gras, and steak frites. The restaurant has also served foie gras French toast, onion soup with melted gruyère cheese, short-rib bourguignon, smoked salmon carpaccio, steak tartare, truffled macaroni, sole meunière, duck confit, riz au lait, beet salad with hazelnuts and tarragon leaves, crème brûlée, and a butter lettuce salad with a dijon vinaigrette. The drink menu included absinthe, Armagnac, and Calvados cocktails as well as Old World wine.

== History ==
Greg and Gabrielle Quiñónez Denton, who were previously owners and chefs at the Portland steakhouse Ox, opened Bistro Agnes on January 18, 2018, following a few soft opening dinners. Bistro Agnes operated in the space previously occupied by the restaurant Grüner. Bistro Agnes, named after Greg's grandmother, has been described as a "spin-off" of Ox, and replaced the couple's short-lived small plates restaurant SuperBite. The couple renovated the restaurant by repainting the walls, expanding the kitchen, adjusting and removing furniture, and adding track lighting to the dining room.

Bistro Agnes began serving brunch in April 2018 and lunch in April 2019. The restaurant was affiliated with ChefStable as of 2019. Chase Dopson was a chef at Bistro Agnes. Beau Burtnick was a bar manager.

During the COVID-19 pandemic, the Dentons decided to close the restaurant in March 2020 for an extended period rather than invest tens of thousands of dollars to meet safety regulations. The business continued to owe $6,000 per month in rent during this time, and the owners had hoped to reopen in 2021. In January 2022, the Dentons announced Bistro Agnes would not reopen, saying that they "[didn't] see a path forward without drastically changing" the restaurant's concept. The building was transferred to another owner.

Dolly Olive moved into the space Bistro Agnes had occupied.

== Reception ==
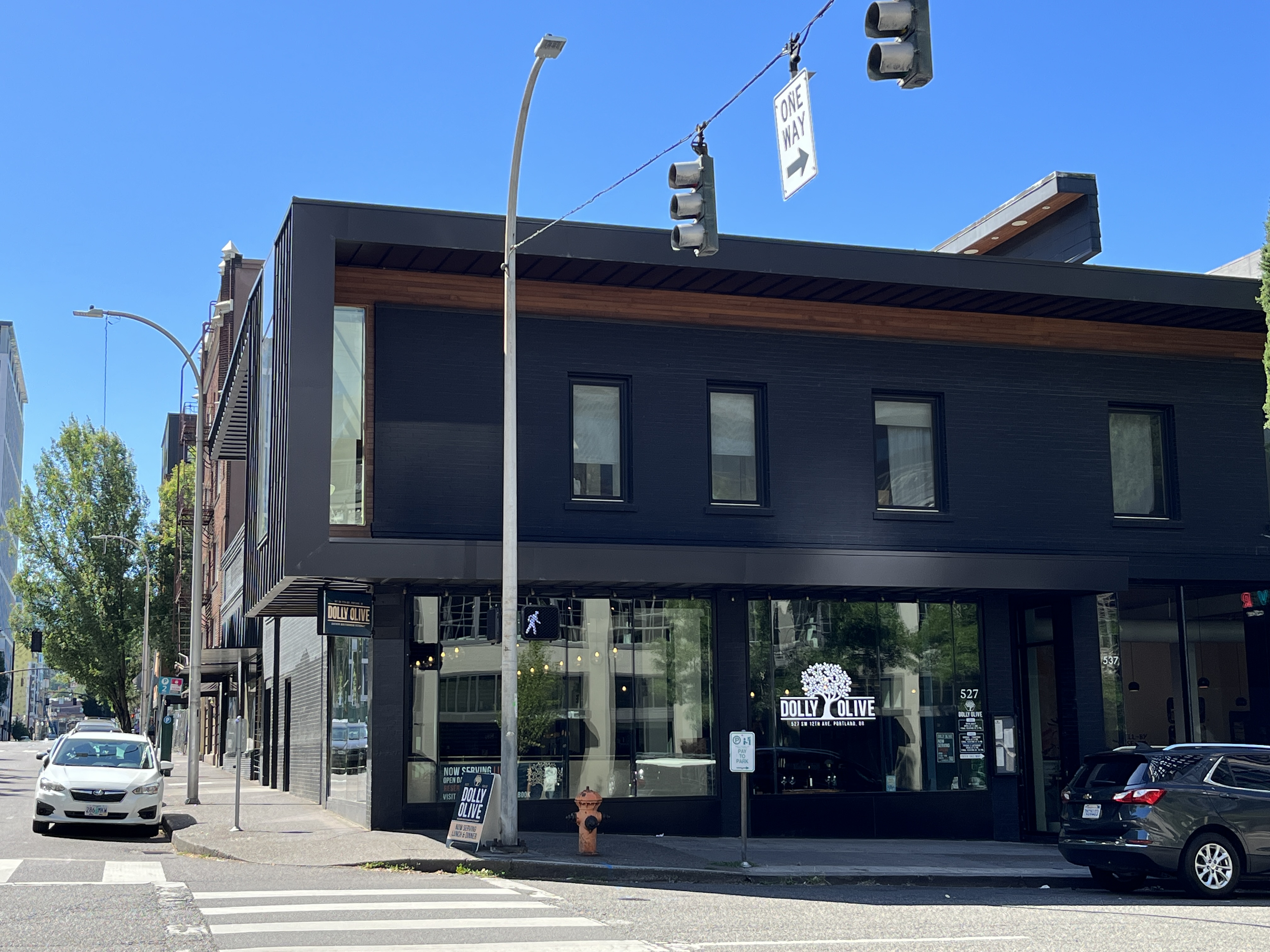
2023 photograph of Dolly Olive, which operates in the building that previously housed Bistro Agnes

In 2018, Michael Russell included Bistro Agnes in The Oregonian's lists of Portland's 10 best new restaurants and downtown Portland's 40 best restaurants. He also ranked the restaurant number 31 in the newspaper's 2019 list of the city's 40 best restaurants. Writing for The Globe and Mail, Alyssa Schwartz said, "Bistro Agnes is so classically Parisian it almost comes full circle back to edgy". Layla Schlack of Wine Enthusiast recommended Bistro Agnes "for beautifully prepared renditions of French cuisine". Andrea Damewood included the bistro's French onion soup in the Portland Mercury's list of "2018's best bites from Portland's best new restaurants". Although The New York Times's Catherine M. Allchin praised several dishes, she criticized that the service was poor, stating that her server was "inattentive".

Hannah Wallace included Bistro Agnes in Condé Nast Traveler's 2018 list of Portland's 21 best restaurants. She said the eatery had precisely executed French comfort food and contained a "friendly, stylish French bistro" ambience. Wallace said Bistro Agnes offered "Parisian sophistication in PDX" and praised the restaurant's service and selection of wines. In 2019, Pete Cottell of Willamette Week recommend the restaurant for "family-style French fare with a modern-American twist". Bistro Agnes ranked fourth in Portland Business Journal's 2020 survey of readers' favorite restaurants.

== See also ==
- Impact of the COVID-19 pandemic on the restaurant industry in the United States
- List of French restaurants
