= Bellwether Bar =

Restaurant in Portland, Oregon, U.S.

- Interactive map of Bellwether Bar

Restaurant information
- Location: Portland, Multnomah, Oregon, United States
- Coordinates: 45.5194°N 122.6016°W

Bellwether Bar is a bar and restaurant in Portland, Oregon, United States.

== Description ==
Bellwether Bar operates in the Thomas Graham Building on Stark Street, in southeast Portland's Mount Tabor neighborhood. The interior has wooden booths and a backyard garden with cherry trees and wisteria.

The food menu includes a bacon cheeseburger, pan-seared chicken thighs, and curry with creme fraiche, as well as chicken liver mousse, grilled prawns, pork chops with rhubarb and shallots, sour cream and onion deviled eggs, a cassoulet with a turnip-white bean salad, and harissa roasted chicken with dill-coasted French fries. Bellwether also serves beer, cocktails, and wine.

== History ==
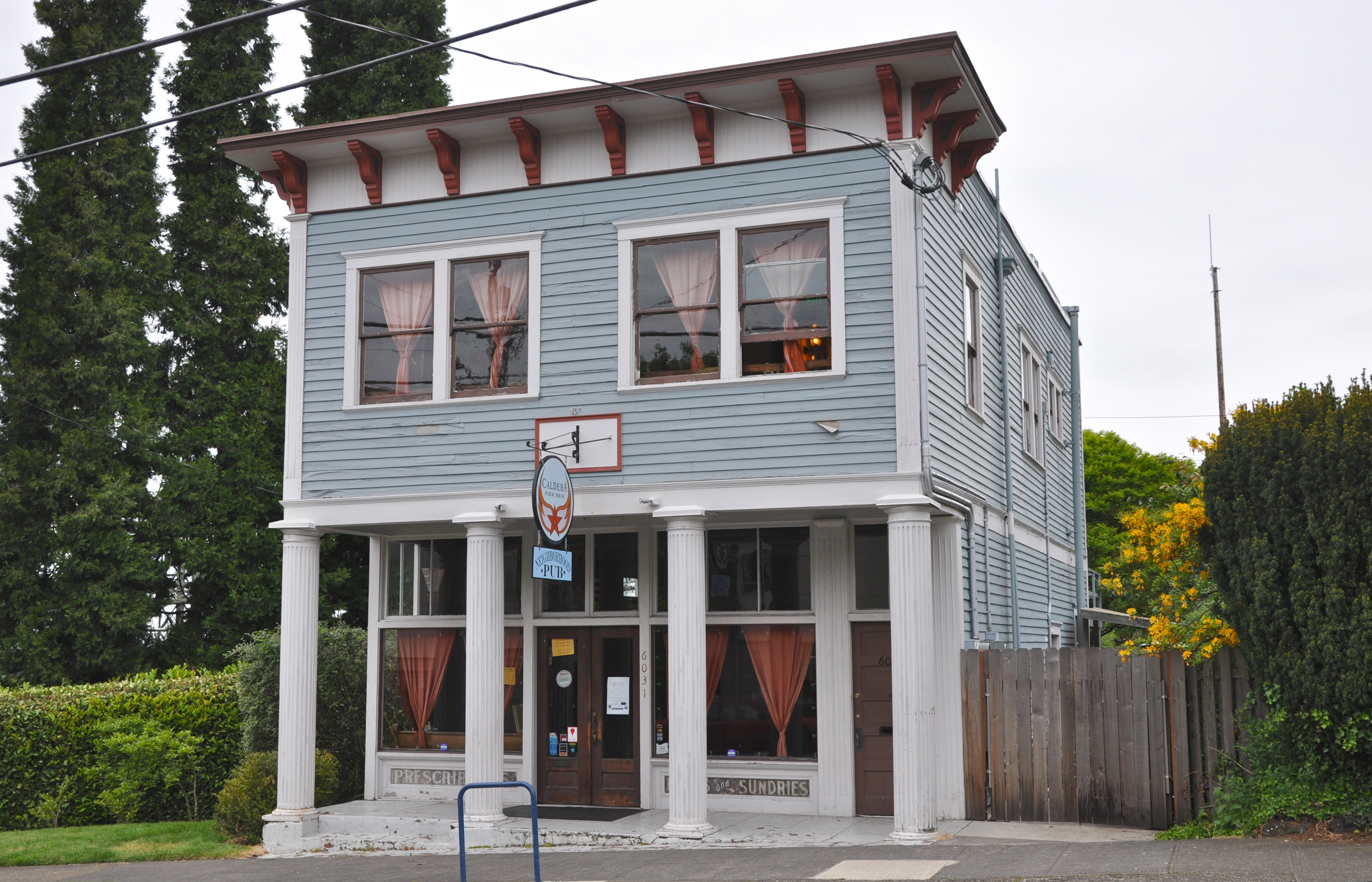
Bellwether Bar operates in the Thomas Graham Building (pictured in 2011), which is listed on the National Register of Historic Places

Bellwether Bar operates in the space that previously housed Caldera Public House. Ansel Vickery is a co-owner. Alex Yoder and Jimmy Askren have been chefs, and Beau Burtnick (Bistro Agnes) has worked the bar.

== Reception ==
In 2023, Carrie Uffindell of Eater Portland wrote, "The food here is worth the visit alone; the vibes are just a bonus." In 2024, the website's Brooke Jackson-Glidden and Thom Hilton included Bellwether in a list of recommended romantic restaurants in the city for a date night, and Rebecca Roland included the business in an overview of Portland's "essential" cocktail bars with "exceptional" drinks. Jackson-Glidden and Asia Alvarez also included the bar in a list of "foolproof first date spots for every kind of Portlander", and Nathan Williams recommended Bellwether for the "standout" patio. Karen Brooks and others included Bellwether in Portland Monthly's 2024 list of the city's fifty best restaurants. The business was included in Time Out Portland's 2025 list of the city's eighteen best restaurants.
