= Ella Elli =

Restaurant in Chicago, Illinois, U.S.

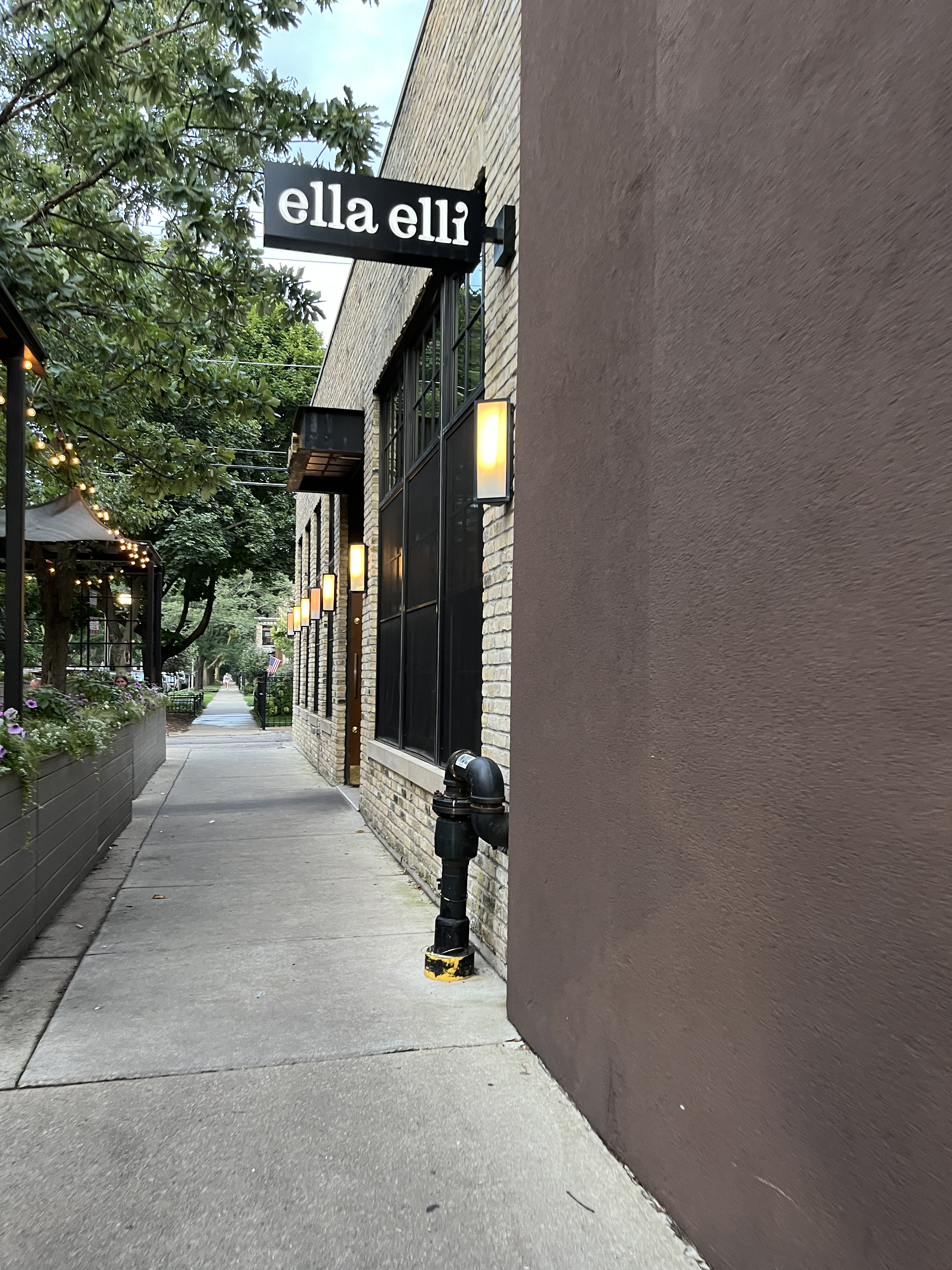
- The restaurant's exterior, 2023
- Interactive map of Ella Elli

Restaurant information
- Location: 1349 West Cornelia Avenue, Chicago, Illinois, 60657, United States
- Coordinates: 41°56′42.5″N 87°39′48.3″W
- Website: ellaellichicago.com

Ella Elli is a restaurant and bar in Chicago, Illinois. Matt Eversman, Dan Harris, and Nolan Narut have been chefs at the restaurant, which is one of others in the area owned by 4 Star Restaurant Group.

== Description ==
Ella Elli is a 2,200-square foot, 75-seat restaurant and bar in Lake View, Chicago. The restaurant serves Mediterranean-inspired cuisine with Californian influences. The small plates menu has included toasts, sliced carrots, pizza, Greek marinated chicken thighs, pastas, and burgers. The happy hour menu has included polenta fries and shrimp with n'duja. Ella Elli also serves brunch with cocktails. It has a lounge area with a fireplace.

== History ==
The restaurant opened in March 2017. Ella Elli was among other restaurants seeking financial support for workers impacted by the COVID-19 pandemic.

== Reception ==
Food & Wine deemed Ella Elli the most romantic restaurant in Illinois in 2022. Time Out Chicago has rated the restaurant four out of five stars.
