= Dolly Olive =

Restaurant in Portland, Oregon, U.S.

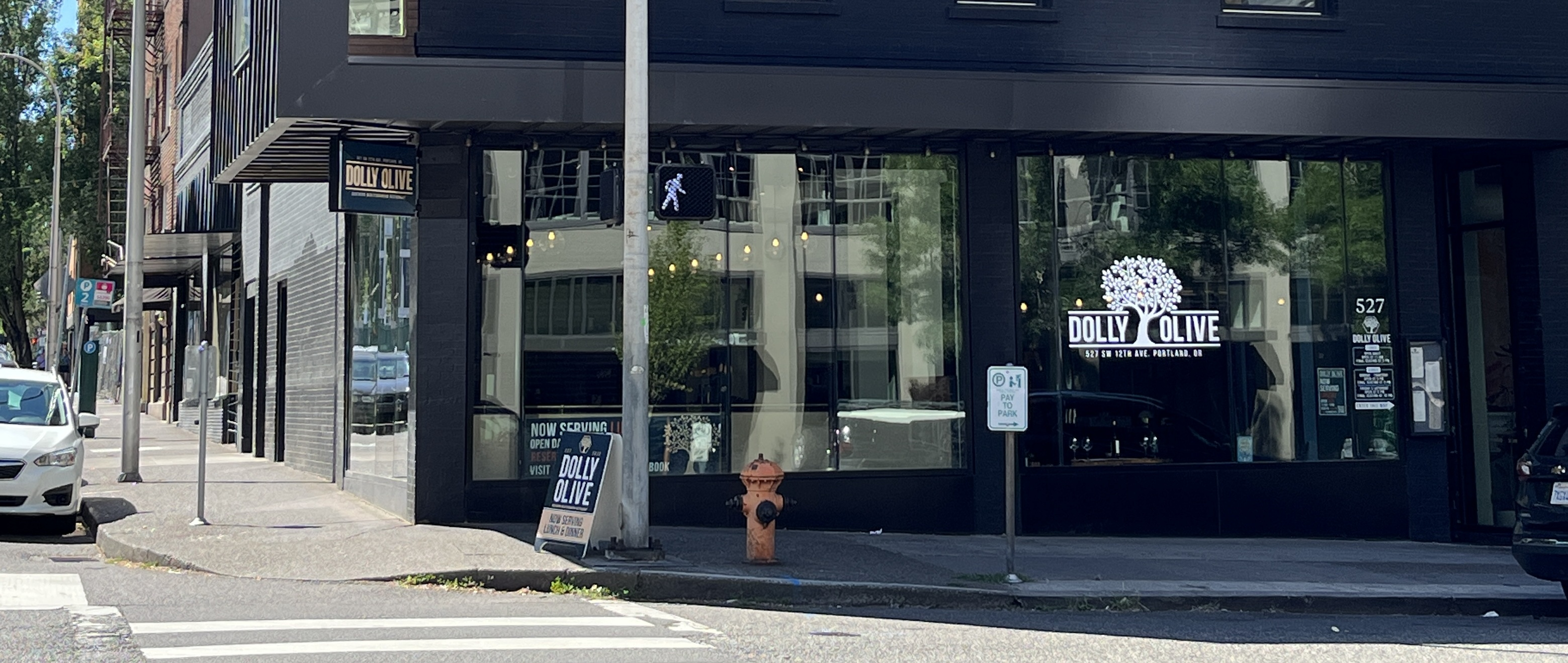
- The restaurant's exterior in July 2023
- Interactive map of Dolly Olive

Restaurant information
- Owner: Sesame Collective
- Food type: Italian; Mediterranean
- Location: 527 Southwest 12th Avenue, Portland, Multnomah, Oregon, 97205, United States
- Coordinates: 45.5214°N 122.6839°W
- Website: dollyolivepdx.com

Dolly Olive is an Italian and Mediterranean restaurant in Portland, Oregon, United States. The restaurant group Sesame Collective opened Dolly Olive in 2022.

== Description ==
The restaurant Dolly Olive operates at the intersection of 12th Avenue and Alder Street in downtown Portland. The Italian-focused Mediterranean menu has included Sicilian eggplant parmigiana, spaghetti with bolognese sauce, and Spanish octopus.

== History ==
The restaurant group Sesame Collective (Mediterranean Exploration Company, Shalom Y'all) opened Dolly Olive on June 22, 2022, in the space previously occupied by Grüner and later Bistro Agnes.

In 2023, Dolly Olive served alcohol-free drinks for Dry January. Lunch service launched in May and daily brunch service began in September 2023.

Sesame Collective opened the cocktail bar Icarus next door in October 2023. Willamette Week has called Dolly Olive and Icarus "sister" establishments.

== Reception ==
Michael Russell included Dolly Olive in The Oregonian's list of Portland's 25 best new restaurants for 2022. In 2025, Dolly Olive was included in Eater Portland's lists of the city's best brunch and Italian restaurants.

== See also ==
- List of Italian restaurants
