= Thomas Graham Building =

Historic building in Portland, Oregon, U.S.

- U.S. National Register of Historic Places
- Portland Historic Landmark
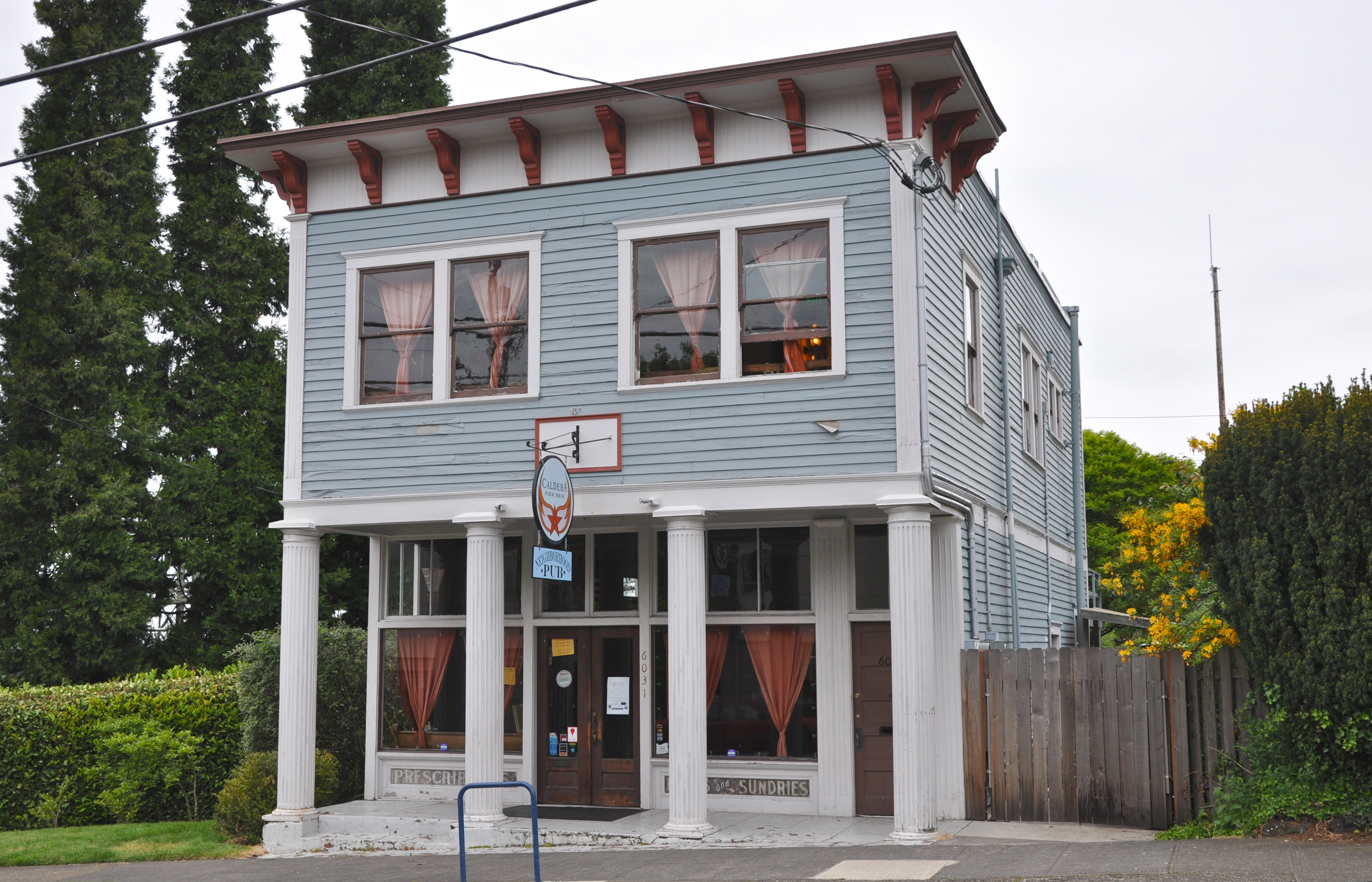
- Thomas Graham Building in 2011

- Location within Portland, Oregon Location within Oregon Location within the United States Location within Oregon
- Location: 6031 SE Stark Street; Portland, Oregon
- Coordinates: 45°31′10″N 122°36′06″W
- Built: 1910
- Architectural style: Vernacular commercial
- NRHP reference No.: 92000134
- Added to NRHP: March 5, 1992

The Thomas Graham Building, 6031 Southeast Stark Street, Portland, in the U.S. state of Oregon, is a two-story commercial building listed on the National Register of Historic Places. Built in 1910, it was added to the register in 1992.

The wood-frame structure, supported by a concrete foundation and including a full basement, houses a business on the first floor and a domestic apartment on the second floor. Architectural features include a recessed storefront facing a colonnade of fluted wood columns, a double-leaf front door, and plate-glass display windows. Constructed by George Foreman for druggist Thomas Graham, the building preserves a form of commercial architecture typical of the city's neighborhood business districts around 1900. The building was named a Portland Historic Landmark in 1981.

Graham, who operated a drugstore in the building for many years, was born in Ontario, Canada, and moved to Portland in 1891. At that time, the Mount Tabor neighborhood, where the building is located, was slowly changing from rural to residential. Minor commercial hubs in the vicinity generally featured small wooden buildings with recessed storefronts facing streetcar lines. The Graham Building is one of only four such buildings that remain intact in central southeast Portland. The building is currently occupied by Bellwether Bar, a neighborhood bar.

== See also ==
- National Register of Historic Places listings in Southeast Portland, Oregon
