= Mediterranean Exploration Company =

Restaurant in Portland, Oregon, U.S.

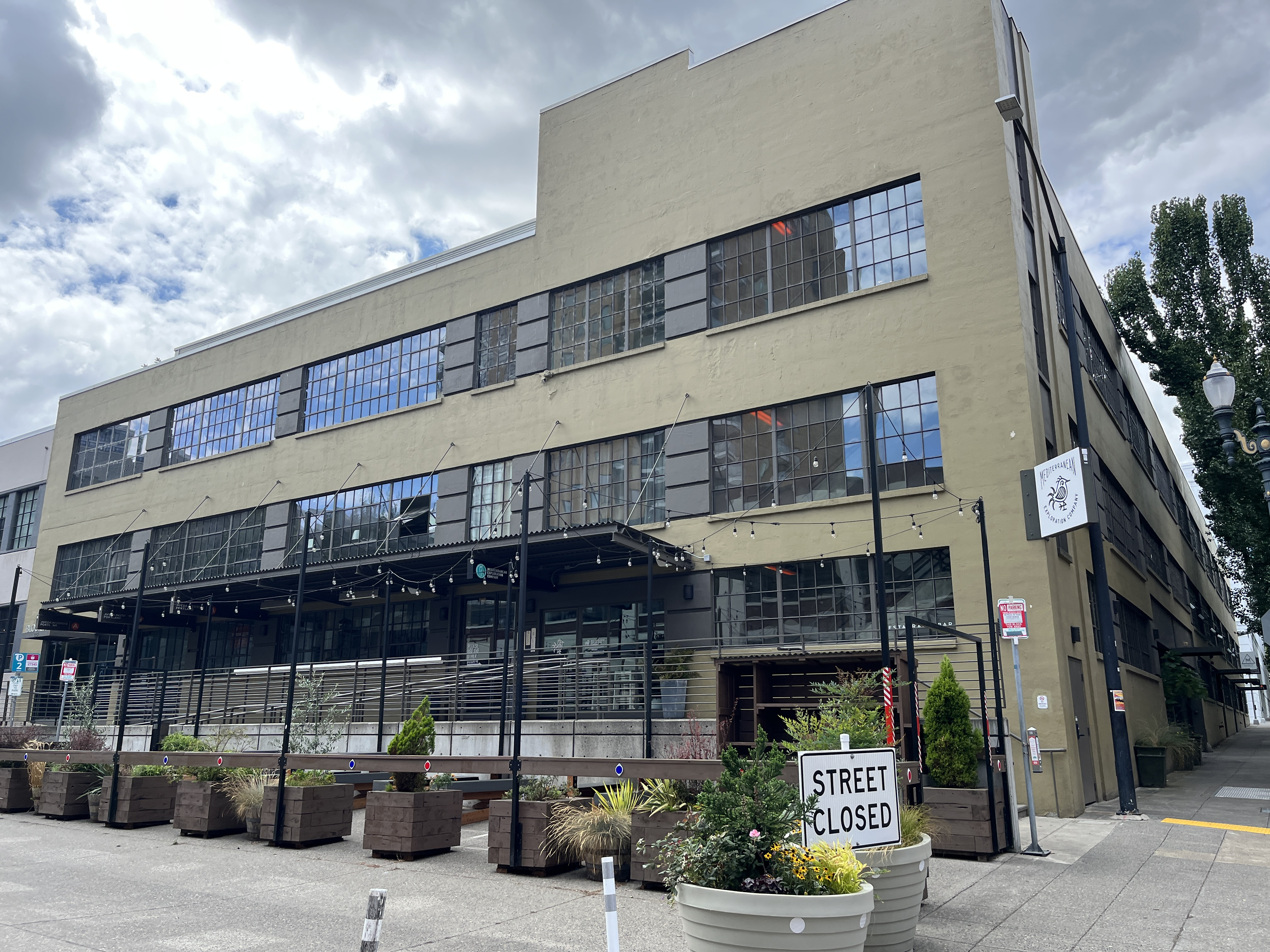
- The restaurants exterior, 2025
- Interactive map of Mediterranean Exploration Company

Restaurant information
- Established: 2014
- Food type: Mediterranean
- Location: Portland, Oregon, United States
- Coordinates: 45.52561°N 122.68451°W

Mediterranean Exploration Company, or MEC, is a Mediterranean restaurant in Portland, Oregon's Pearl District, in the United States.

== Description ==
The restaurant Mediterranean Exploration Company (or MEC) operates in northwest Portland's Pearl District. Food options include bacon-wrapped dates, falafel, mujaddara, and hummus with pita. The drink menu includes beer, cocktails, and wine, as well as tea and Turkish coffee.

== History ==
The restaurant opened in August 2014, in the space that previously housed Riffle NW.

== Reception ==
Kara Stokes and Maya MacEvoy included MEC in Eater Portland's 2022 overview of recommended restaurants in the Pearl District. The website included the business in a similar list in 2025.

MEC was a runner-up in the Best Mediterranean Restaurant category of Willamette Week's annual Best of Portland readers' poll in 2015. It ranked third in the same category in 2016 and 2017.
