= Rancho Gordo =

American food company

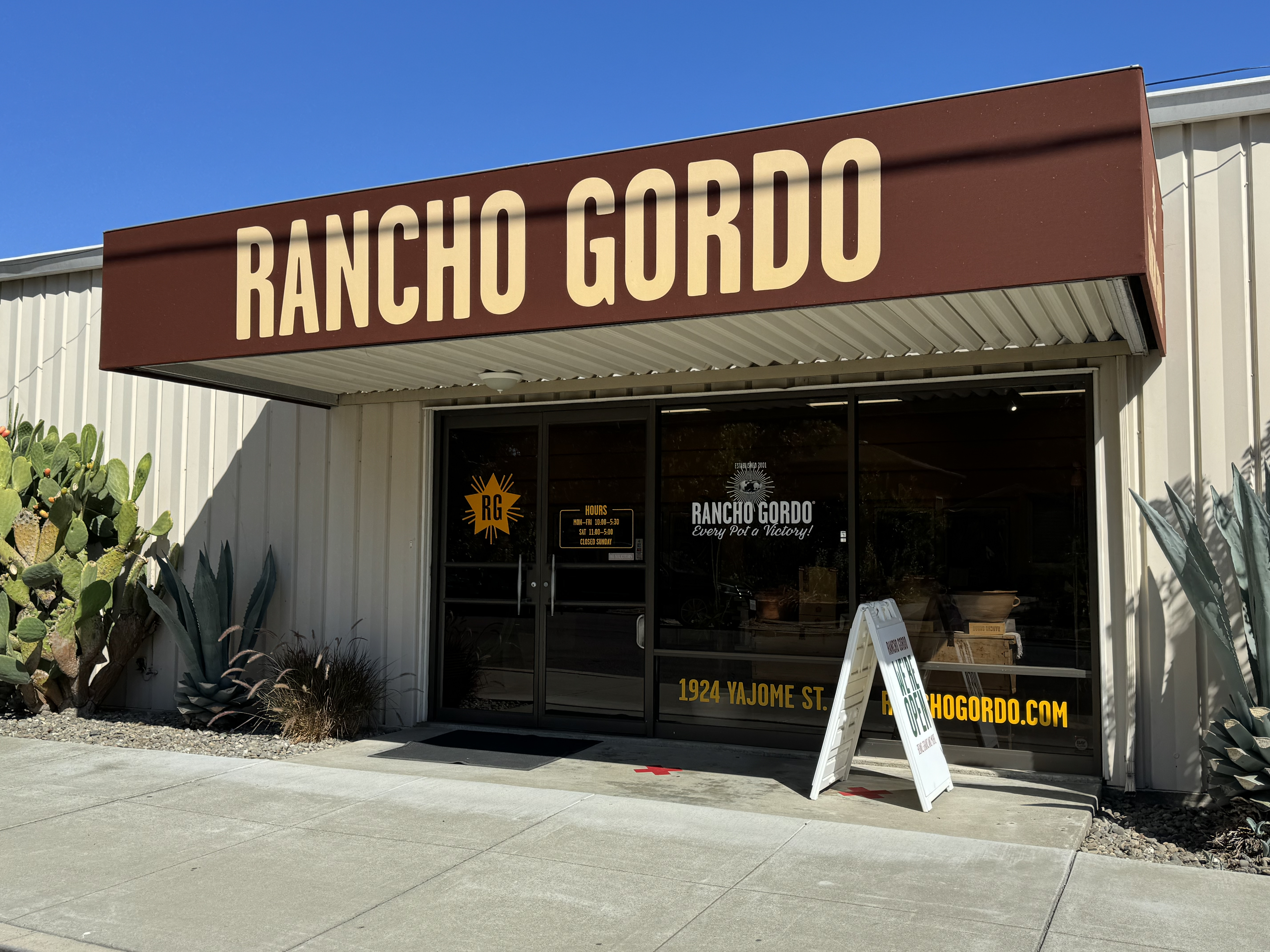
Rancho Gordo's retail store, offices and distribution warehouse in Napa, California.

Rancho Gordo ("the fat ranch" in Spanish) is an heirloom bean company based in Napa, California, known for its mission to preserve and promote traditional and rare bean varieties, particularly those with cultural and culinary significance in Mexico and the Americas, as well as supporting sustainable agriculture and small-scale farmers.

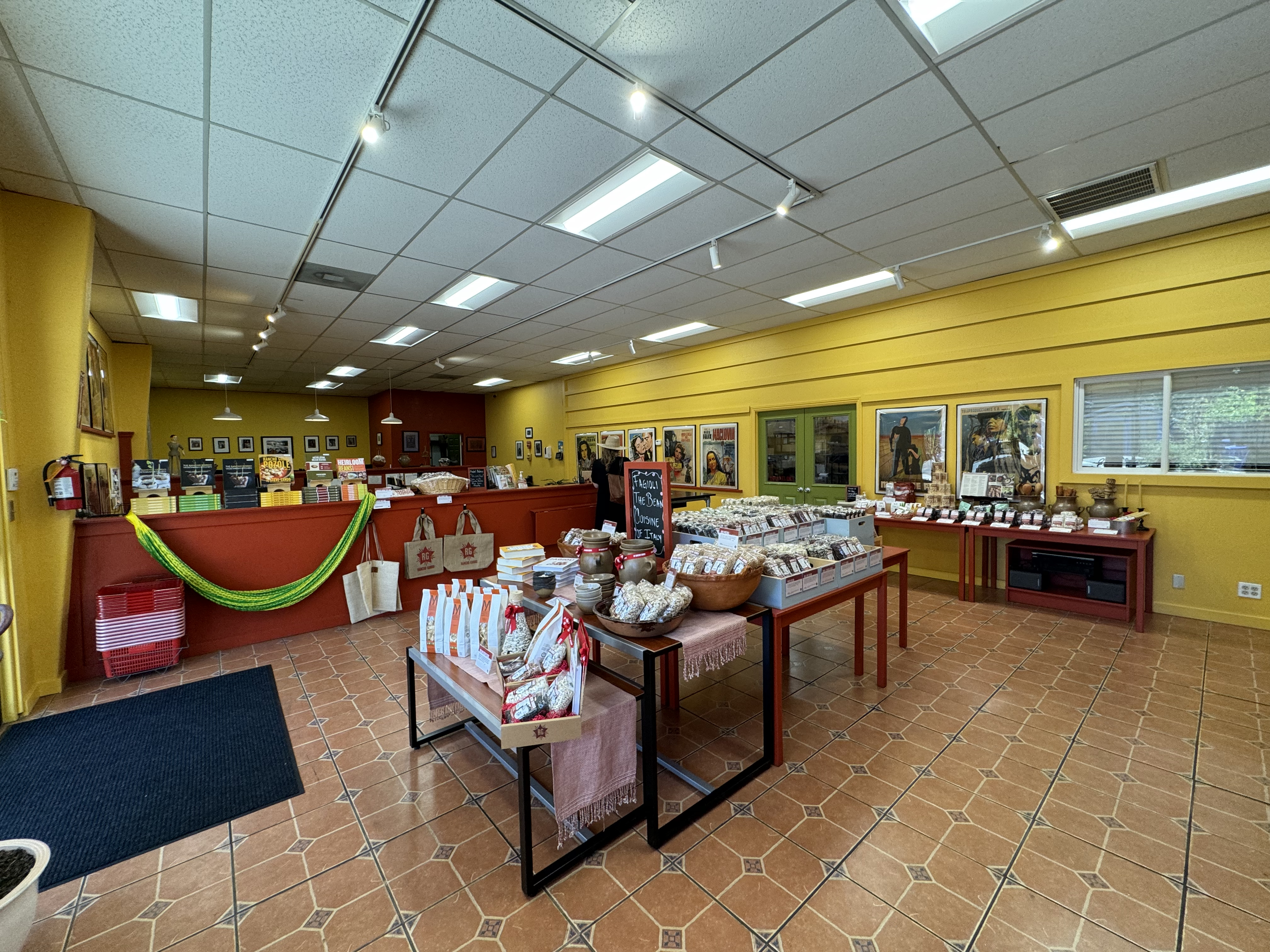
Rancho Gordo's retail space and offices in Napa, California.

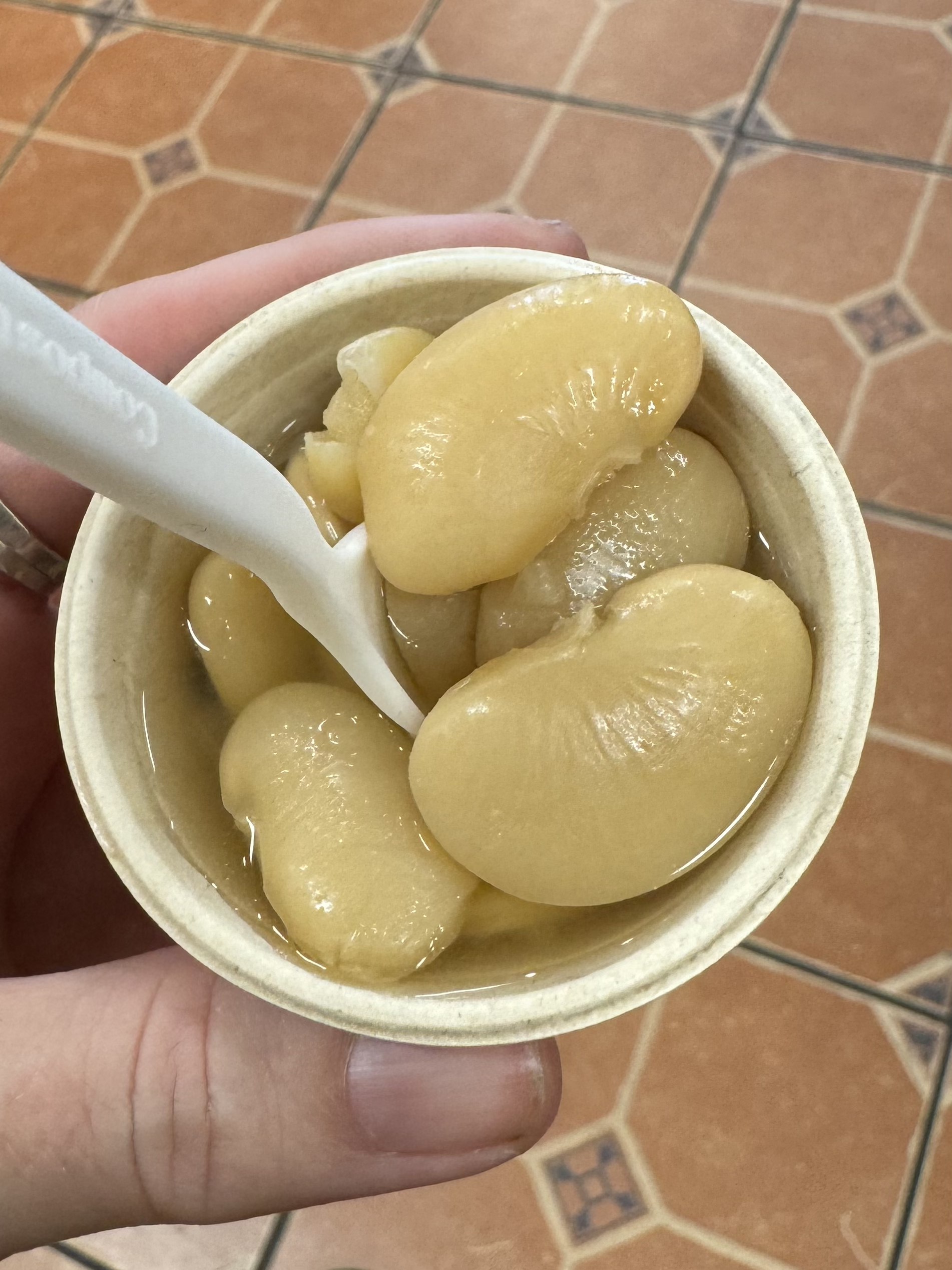
Rancho Gordo's large white Lima beans.

== History ==
Steve Sando was a former web designer, Jazz radio DJ, and wholesaler of Esprit clothing, when he burned out, moved to Napa, and decided to grow heirloom tomatoes despite having no experience in agriculture. During this time Sando was approached by a fellow farmer who sought his help in marketing heirloom beans. Thanks to this encounter, Sando realized their potential and started growing them alongside his tomatoes.

Sando founded Rancho Gordo in 2001, and started selling his beans at farmers markets in Yountville. Around this time, Sando gathered bean seeds from Seed Savers Exchange, incorporating varieties of beans from Oaxaca, Mexico. Sales were initially slow, which he attributed to the bad reputation beans held in the United States.

Sales picked up after Thomas Keller noticed Sando's stand at the Yountville farmers market in 2003. Within a month, Rancho Gordo beans became a staple at Keller's The French Laundry, a restaurant that in 2006 would go on to be awarded three stars in the Michelin Guide.

During this time, sales improved so much that the bottleneck for Rancho Gordo's growth shifted from demand to supply. Sando's space was limited and his yield inconsistent, so he approached several more experienced industrial growers who turned him down saying that the yields of heirloom beans were too low to justify growing them. In 2012 Sando hired James Schrupp, an agronomist, to handle crop management. In turn, Schrupp contracted growers in the San Joaquin and Sacramento Valleys, as well as Washington's Columbia Plateau. The company also started selling hot sauce, dried pozole corn, quinoa, and chili peppers.

=== The Bean Club ===
Started in 2013, the Rancho Gordo Bean Club is a subscription service that offers members quarterly shipments of a curated selection of seasonal heirloom beans, as well as priority access to limited edition beans, discounts on Rancho Gordo products, and bean recipes. The Bean Club proved extremely popular, and as of 2024 it had over 26,000 members with a waiting list of 12,000.

=== Today ===
Today, beans and other products are sourced from local growers in California's central valley, Oregon and Washington, as well as Mexico, Peru, Poland, Bolivia and Colombia. Most of the dried beans produced are sold in branded packages through Rancho Gordo's website or other web stores, at the company's store in Napa, via wholesalers, or directly at farmers' markets.

== Impact ==
=== Commercial success ===
Over its 20 years Rancho Gordo evolved from a farmer's market stand to a multi-million dollar business. Rancho Gordo's bean production rose from 300 pounds (140 kg) in 2001 to 150,000 pounds (68,000 kg) in 2007, to 250,000 pounds (110,000 kg) in 2008, and by 2018 the company was selling 500,000 pounds (230,000 kg) of beans per year.

Rancho Gordo supplies world-famous chefs like Thomas Keller, who uses their beans in his French Laundry and Per Se restaurants, as well as celebrated San Francisco restaurants like Nari, Kin Khao, Californios, State Bird Provisions, Luna Kitchen, and Plow.

=== Reviving heirloom beans ===
Steve Sando and Rancho Gordo have been credited for "almost singlehandedly re-popularizing beans in the US," helping Mexican farmers keep growing their indigenous crops, saving some heirloom beans from extinction, and fostering diversity while fighting off monocultures.

In 2015, Rancho Gordo introduced the Marcella bean, grown on the West Coast from Italian sorana seed, at the suggestion of cookbook author Marcella Hazan. The bean was harvested just as Hazan died, and Sando named the bean "Marcella" in tribute to her, with the blessings of her husband, Victor.

== Bibliography ==
Steve Sando has written seven books on beans:

- Heirloom Beans (2009, 2013), co-written with Vanessa Barrington
- The Rancho Gordo Heirloom Bean Growers Guide (2011, 2019)
- Supper at Rancho Gordo (2014)
- The Rancho Gordo Vegetarian Kitchen (2017) co-written with Julia Newberry
- French Beans (2018) co-written with Georgeanne Brennan
- The Rancho Gordo Pozole Book (2019)
- The Bean Book (2024) co-written with Julia Newberry.
