= Cassoulet =

Slow-cooked stew containing meat and white beans

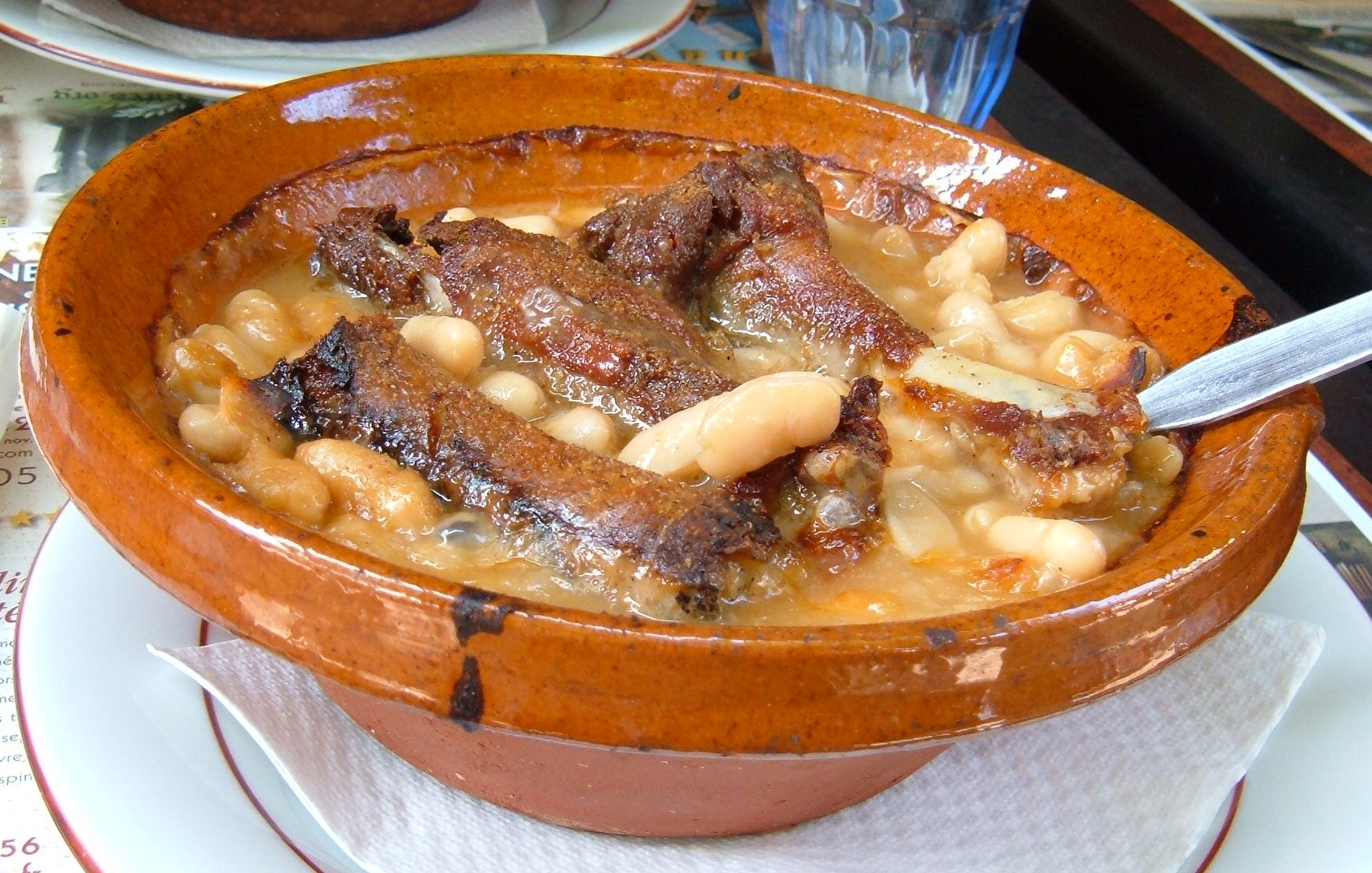
- Cassoulet served in Carcassonne, France, in a casserole sized for single serving
- Type: Stew/casserole
- Place of origin: France
- Main ingredients: Haricot beans with meat (typically pork, sausages, goose, duck, lamb or mutton)

Cassoulet (/ˌkæsəˈleɪ/, also UK: /ˈkæsʊleɪ/,US: /ˌkæsʊˈleɪ/; French: [kasulɛ]; Occitan: Cassolada) is a rich stew originating in southern France. The food writer Elizabeth David described it as "that sumptuous amalgamation of haricot beans, sausage, pork, mutton and preserved goose, aromatically spiced with garlic and herbs". It originated in the town of Castelnaudary in the Aude department in the Occitanie region. Variants of the dish are local to other towns and cities in the Aude.

== History and etymology ==
According to tradition, cassoulet was invented in 1355 in the town of Castelnaudary, under siege by the English during the Hundred Years' War. (Note: The legend goes that the inhabitants prepared themselves for battle by eating a stew of beans, duck, goose and sausage, and, thus fortified, repelled the English attackers. In historical fact there was no siege and the Black Prince sacked and burned the town and killed much of the populace.) In medieval times the dish was referred to as an estouffet. The Dictionnaire de l'Académie française dates the term cassoulet to no earlier than the 19th century. The current name is a diminutive of the Languedoc cassolo – a cooking pot – according to the Dictionnaire de l'Académie française; Elizabeth David states that it comes from "Cassol d'Issel", the original clay baking pot made in the small town of Issel, near Castelnaudary.

In cassoulets, the haricot bean is now the principal ingredient. In the medieval period, broad beans (favolles), fresh or dried, were used in stews of the cassoulet type. Sources differ on when haricots were first used instead of favolles: the Oxford Companion to Food states that haricots arrived in France via Spain from the New World in the 16th century; according to Larousse Gastronomique they were not used in France until the 19th century.

== Method ==
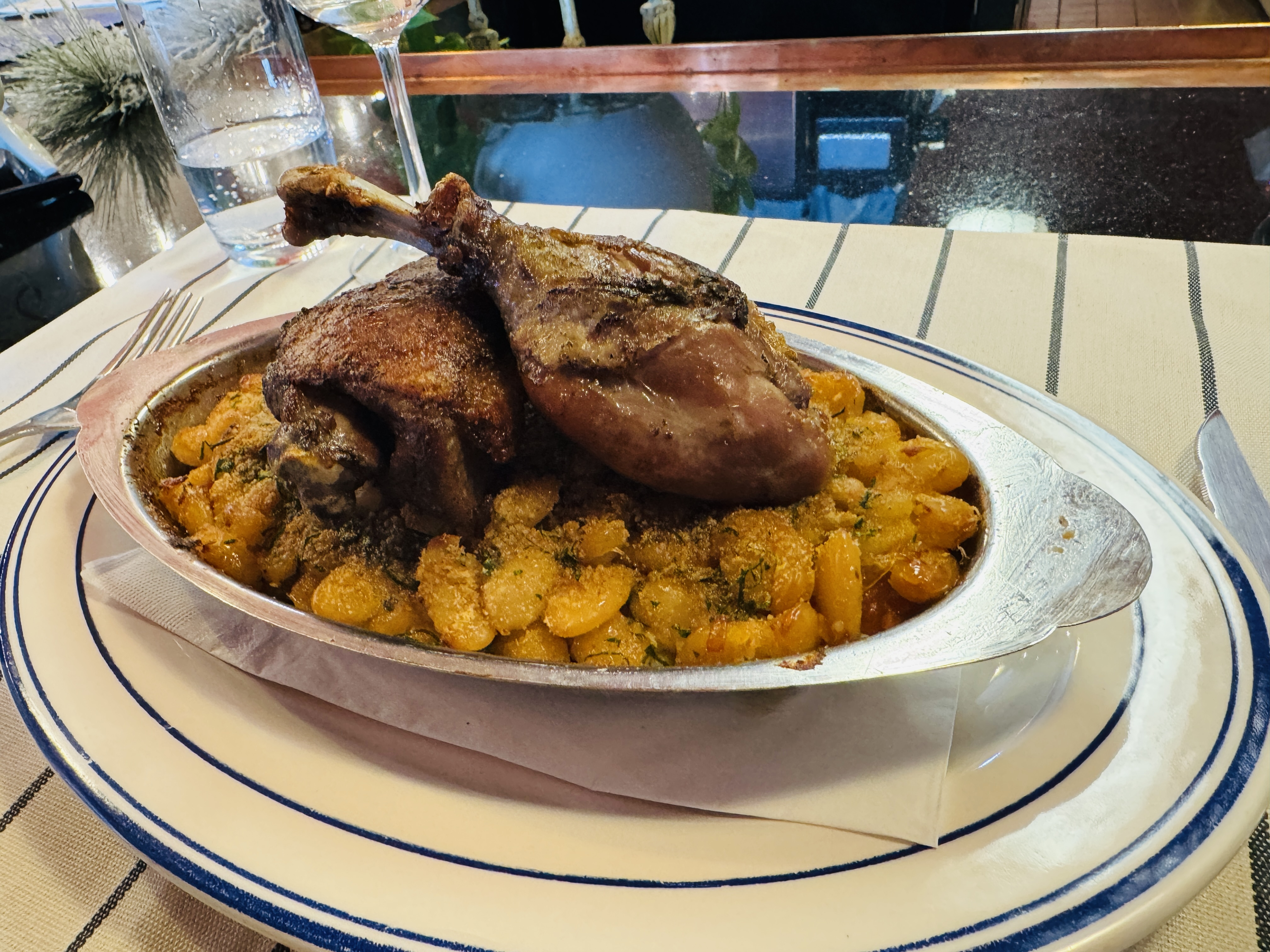
Cassoulet with duck and Rancho Gordo beans at Maison Porcella in Windsor, California

Traditionally, the dish is cooked in an earthenware pot, which Jane Grigson notes is correctly called a cassole or toupin; she adds that any earthenware or stoneware casserole will do, "provided it is deep and wide". The authors of Mastering the Art of French Cooking, Simone Beck, Louisette Bertholle and Julia Child, write, "The composition of a cassoulet is, in typical French fashion, the subject of infinite dispute ... arguments about what should go into this famous dish seem based on local traditions". Although haricot beans are common to all varieties, the meats vary considerably. The Michelin Guide comments that every town brings its own personal touch to the recipe, all claiming the title of the one and only stronghold of authentic cassoulet.

Beck, Bertholle and Child comment that regardless of local custom, an extremely good cassoulet can be made anywhere out of beans with "whatever traditional meats are available: goose, game, pork, sausages, lamb, mutton". To this list, David adds turkey legs or wings, and Grigson adds partridges. In 1996, the Etats généraux de la gastronomie traditionnelle française, a professional body dedicated to promoting regional products and traditional cuisine, specified the following proportions for cassoulet: at least 30 per cent pork (which can include sausage and Toulouse sausage), mutton or preserved goose; and up to 70 per cent haricot beans and stock, fresh pork rind, herbs and flavourings.

The editor of the original Larousse Gastronomique, Prosper Montagné, divided the main varieties of cassoulet into "the Trinity", according to the meats used, the "Father" being the cassoulet from Castelnaudary, the "Son" the cassoulet from Carcassonne and the "Holy Ghost" that from Toulouse. The Castelnaudary cassoulet contains pork (loin, ham, leg, sausages and fresh rind) and in some recipes preserved goose. The Carcassonne version uses leg of mutton and, when in season, partridge. The Toulouse cassoulet uses smaller quantities of the same meats used in Castelnaudary but adds Toulouse sausage and mutton and also duck or goose, according to Larousse, or partridge, according to Grigson.

Other variants include the Montaubon cassoulet, spiced with tomato purée; the food historian Maguelonne Toussaint-Samat observes that it "would be sacrilege to make cassoulet in Corbières without lightly salted pig's tail and ears"; and Larousse records a fish cassoulet, made with salt cod replacing the duck or goose. Common to most recipes for cassoulet is a sprinkling of breadcrumbs, to form a crust on the surface of the dish.

Although recipes have been published for haute cuisine versions of cassoulet in which roast meats are mixed with beans that have been simmered separately with aromatic vegetables, Beck, Bertholle and Child comment that cassoulet is not "a kind of rare ambrosia" but rather "nourishing country fare". David calls it a "sumptuous amalgamation of haricot beans, sausage, pork, mutton and preserved goose, aromatically spiced with garlic and herbs". In the process of preparing the dish, it is traditional to deglaze the pot from the previous cassoulet to give a base for the next one. This has led to stories, such as the one given by David, citing Anatole France, of a single original cassoulet being extended for years or even decades. (Note: "Le cassoulet de la mère Clémence cuit depuis vingt ans. Elle ajoute de temps en temp dans la marmite, de l'oie, ou du lard, parfois un morceau de saucisson ou quelques haricots, mais c'est toujours le même cassoulet." – Mother Clémence's cassoulet has been cooking for twenty years. From time to time she adds to the pot goose, or bacon, sometimes a piece of sausage or some beans, but it is always the same cassoulet.)

== La Grande confrérie ==
In 1970, La Grande confrérie du cassoulet de Castelnaudary – The Grand Brotherhood of the Cassoulet of Castelnaudary – was established to increase the prestige and spread and defend the traditions and quality of cassoulet. Together with the town council and other bodies, the confrérie set up the Fête du Cassoulet in 2000, a three-day annual festival celebrating cassoulet, offering tastings along with free concerts, a flower parade and other attractions.

== See also ==
- Cassolette
- Cassoeula
- Tavče gravče
- Guernsey bean jar
- Cozido
- Fabada asturiana
- Feijoada
- Cholent
- List of casserole dishes
- List of French dishes
- List of sausage dishes
- List of stews
- Occitan cuisine
- Perpetual stew
- Pork and beans

== Notes, references and sources ==
=== Sources ===
- Beck, Simone; Louisette Bertholle; Julia Child (2012) [1961]. Mastering the Art of French Cooking, Volume One. London: Particular. ISBN 978-0-241-95339-6.
- Beullac, Geneviève, ed. (2001). Larousse Gastronomique. London: Hamlyn. ISBN 978-0-60-060235-4.
- David, Elizabeth (1999) [1980]. Elizabeth David Classics. London: Grub Street. ISBN 978-1-902304-27-4.
- David, Elizabeth (2008) [1960]. French Provincial Cooking. London: Folio Society. OCLC 809349711.
- Grigson, Jane (2008). Charcuterie and French Pork Cookery. London: Grub Street. ISBN 978-1-90-811793-9.
- Rupp, Rebecca (2011). How Carrots Won the Trojan War. North Adams: Storey. ISBN 978-1-60-342968-9.
- Toussaint-Samat, Maguelonne (2009). A History of Food. London: Wiley. ISBN 978-1-44-430514-2.
- Bonnes petites tables du guide Michelin 2011. Paris: Le guide Michelin. 2010. ISBN 978-2-06-715392-9.
