= Saucisse de Toulouse =

French sausage

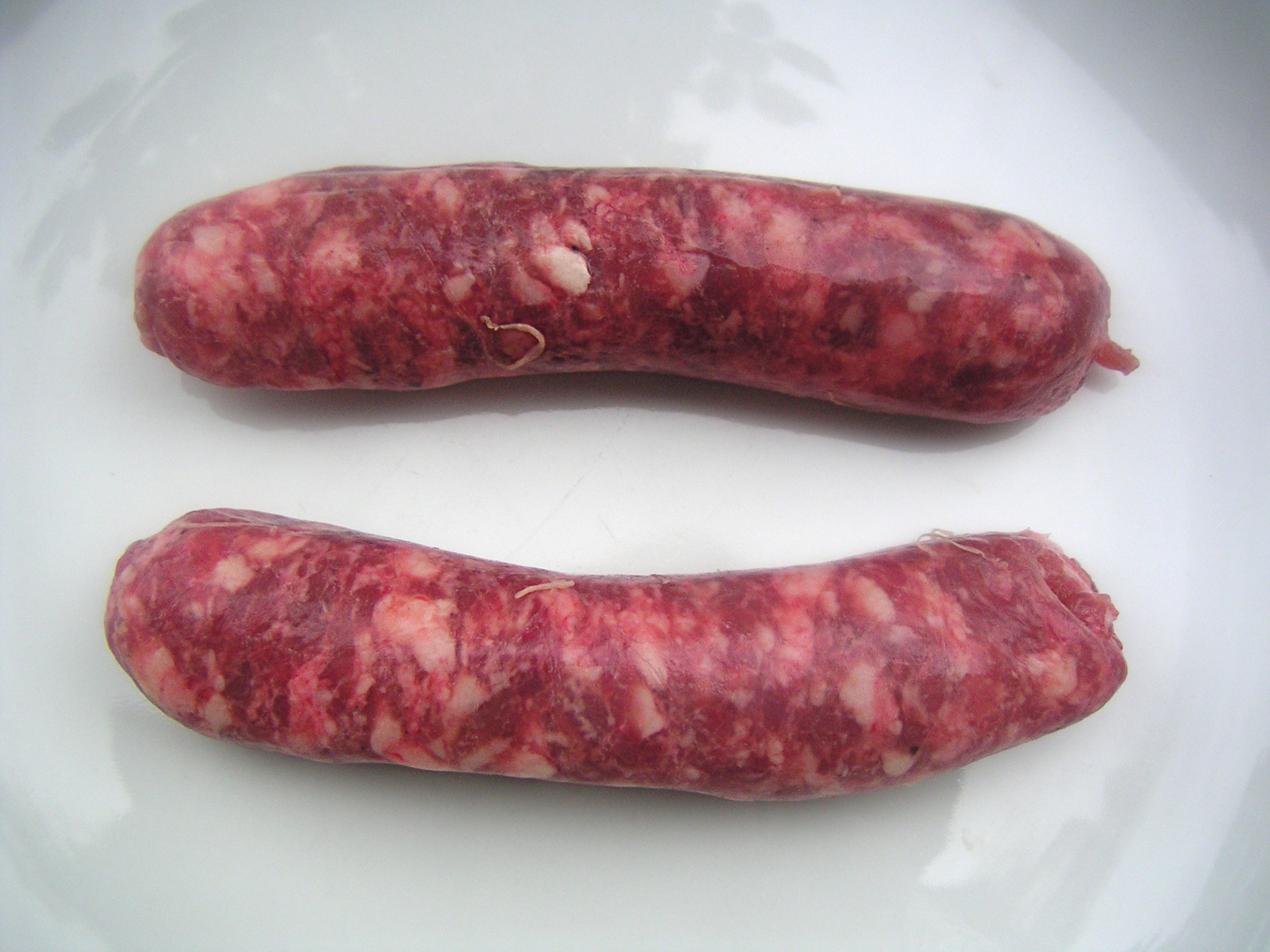
Raw saucisse de Toulouse

Saucisse de Toulouse (Toulouse sausage) is a fresh sausage originating from Toulouse in southwest France. It is made from pork (75% lean, 25% belly), salt and pepper, has a natural casing of about 3 cm (1.2 in) in diameter and is usually sold in a coil (like Cumberland sausage).

It is an ingredient of most cassoulet recipes and is also served grilled or confit.

Saucisse de Toulouse does not have a protected status so variations on the original recipe can be sold under the same name. Producers' organisations have proposed a Label Rouge designation for the product the recipe for which would adhere to certain criteria: raw pork meat and fat (no more than 80% lean), ham without shank, shoulder without shank, loin, brisket, and back fat; a natural casing of pork or mutton; salt at an amount between 1.5% and 1.8% of the total ingredients; water, ice; sugars at a maximum of 1% of the total ingredients (only sucrose, dextrose, glucose, or lactose); aromatics, spices and wines at a maximum of 0.7% in total, and trace amounts of one of: ascorbic acid (E300), sodium ascorbate (E301), erythorbic acid (E315), or sodium erythorbate (E316) as a preservative.

== See also ==
- List of sausages
- Botifarra
