= Grüner (restaurant) =

Defunct restaurant in Portland, Oregon, U.S.

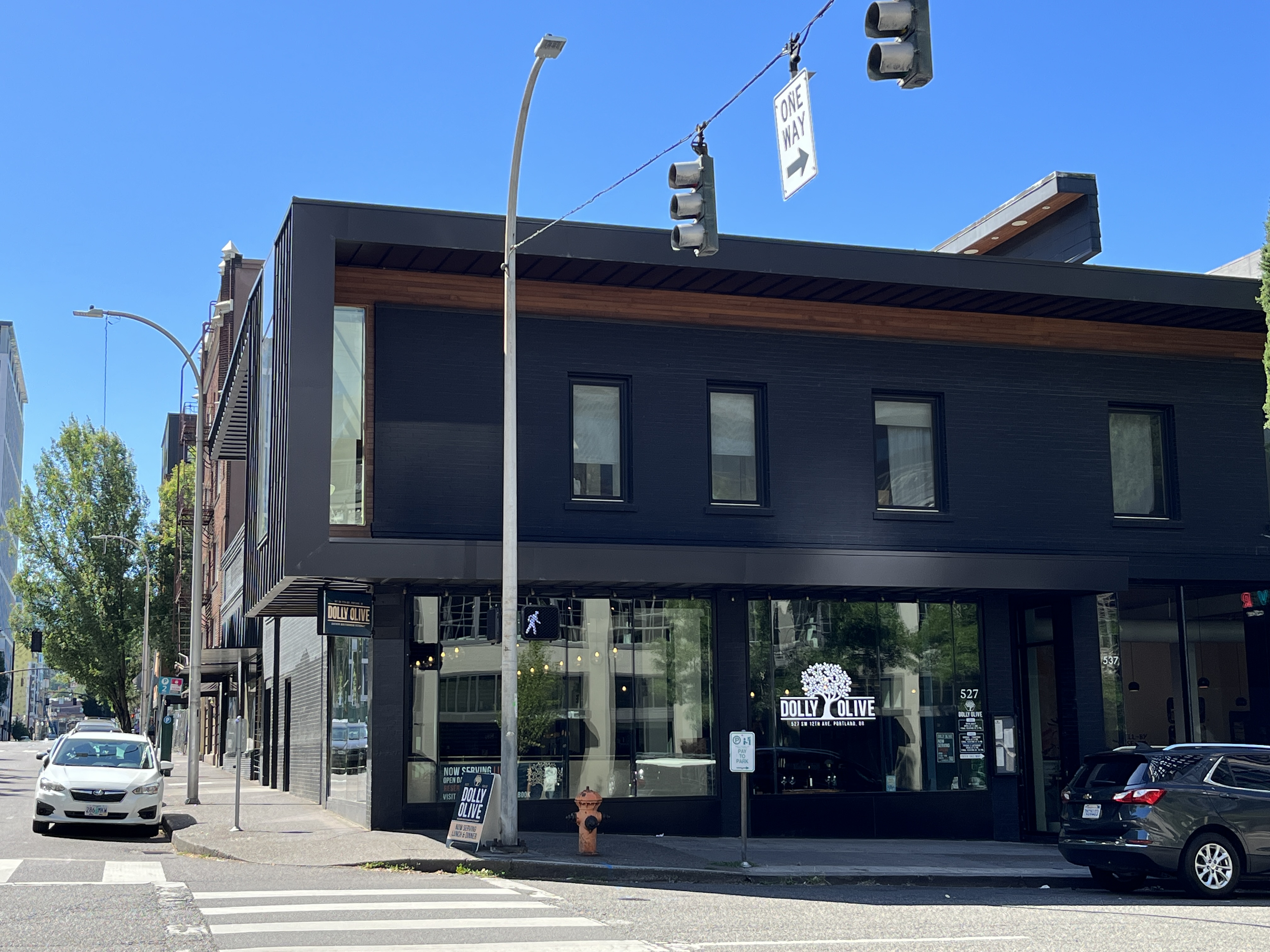
- 2023 photograph of Dolly Olive, which operates in the building that previously housed Grüner
- Interactive map of Grüner

Restaurant information
- Established: 2009
- Closed: December 31, 2015
- Chef: Chris Israel
- Food type: Alpine; German
- Location: 527 Southwest 12th Avenue, Portland, Oregon, Multnomah, Oregon, 97205, United States
- Coordinates: 45.52144°N 122.68393°W

Grüner was an "Alpine" restaurant in Portland, Oregon, United States.

== Description and history ==
The restaurant was opened by Chris Israel in late 2009, and closed after December 31, 2015. Grüner's mainstay burger, dubbed "The Hambürger", was thought by many to be Portland's best, and it was reintroduced at The Loyal Legion when the former Executive Chef of Grüner took over that venue's bar. The restaurant also served bratwurst, pretzel-wrapped weisswurst, saucisson sausage, sauerkraut, gold potatoes, and sweet-hot mustard. The drink menu included German-style beers.

== Kask ==
Grüner's attached bar, Kask, was named one of the top five cocktail bars in the city by the Drink Spirits magazine, and initially remained open following Grüner's closure. Kask was given a four star rating by Difford's Guide in 2014. It has since closed, and Icarus has moved into the space.

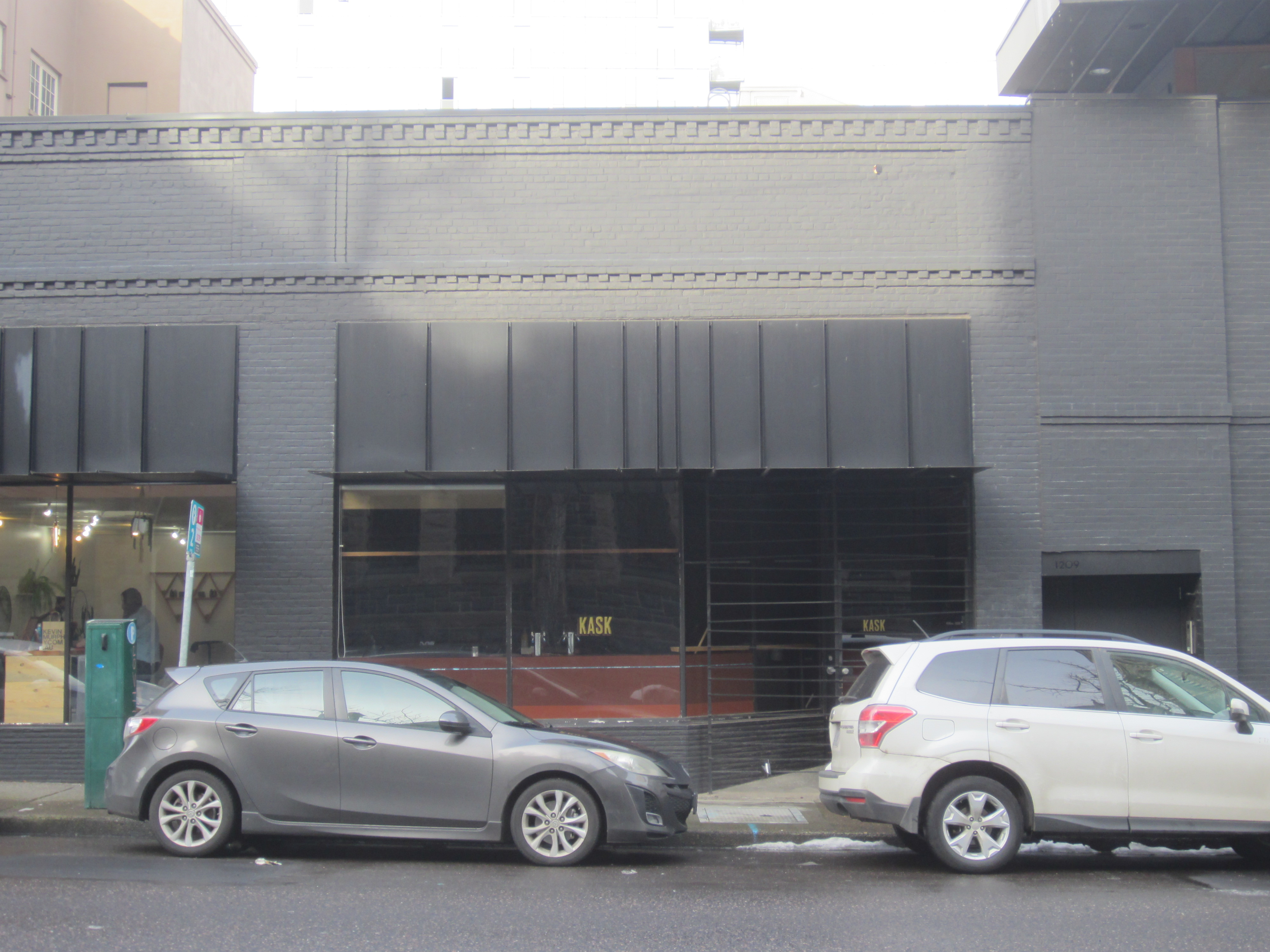
Exterior of Kask

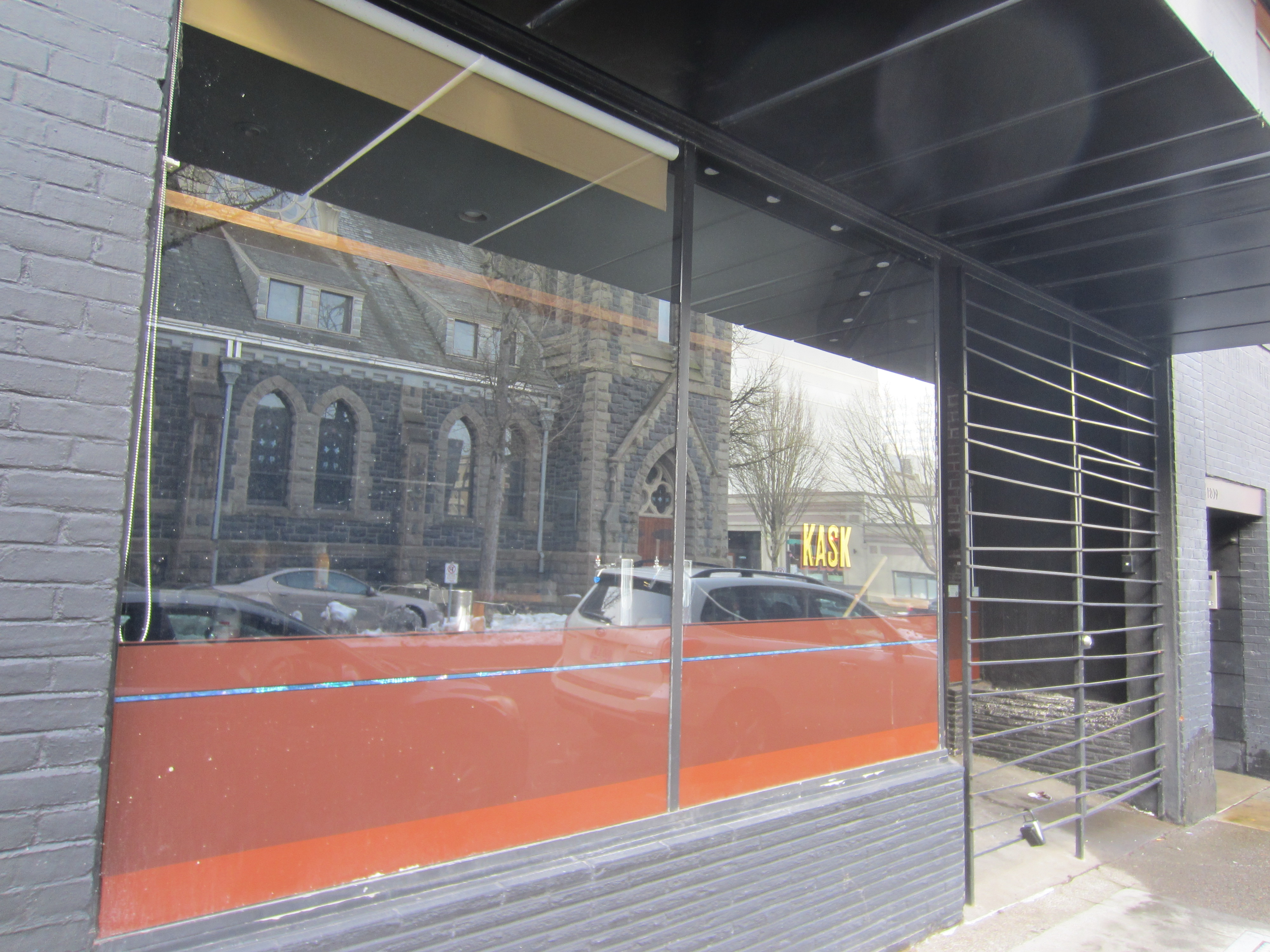
Exterior of Kask

== See also ==
- List of German restaurants
