= Small plates =

Manner of dining

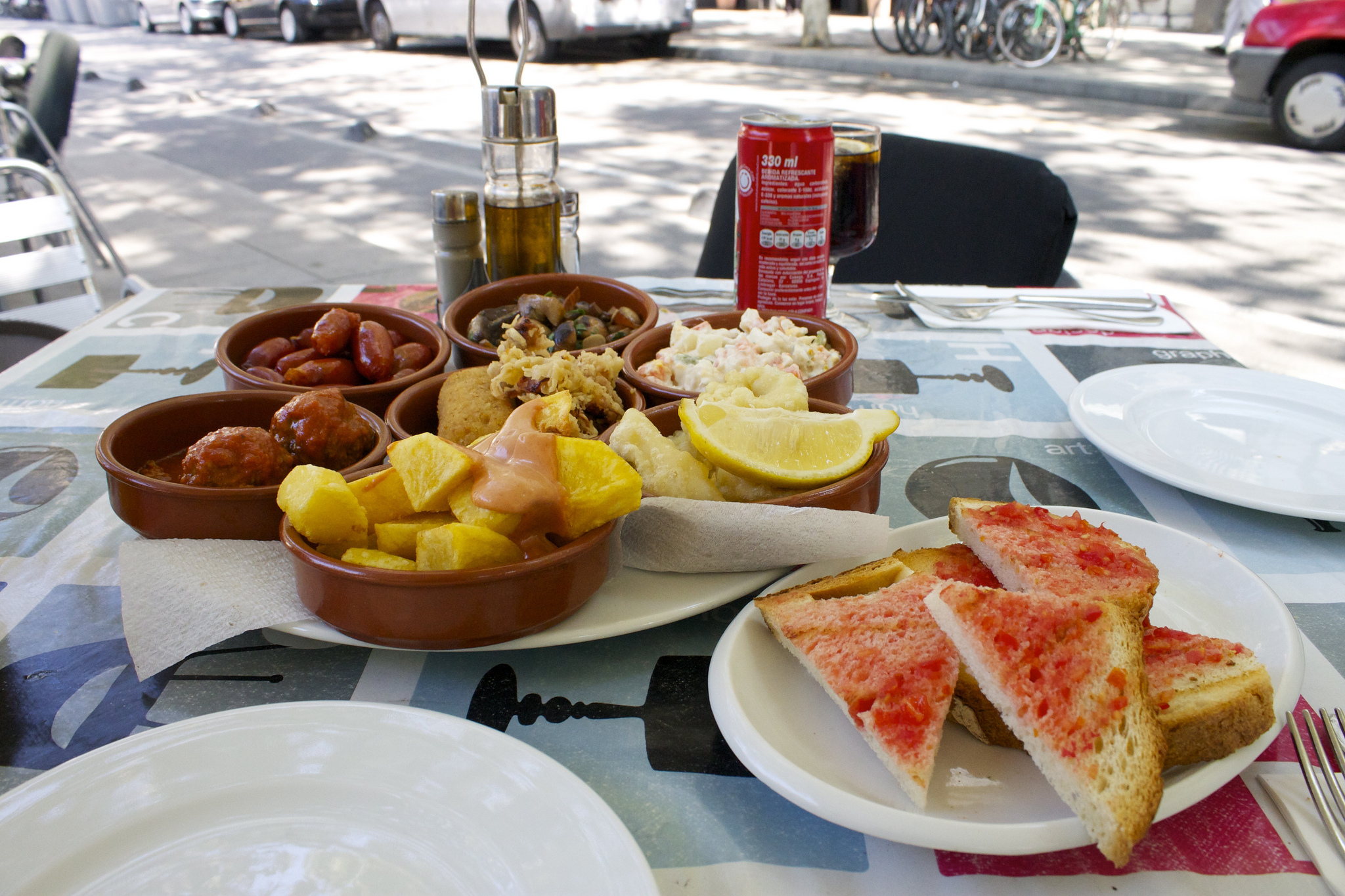
Tapas served in Barcelona, Spain

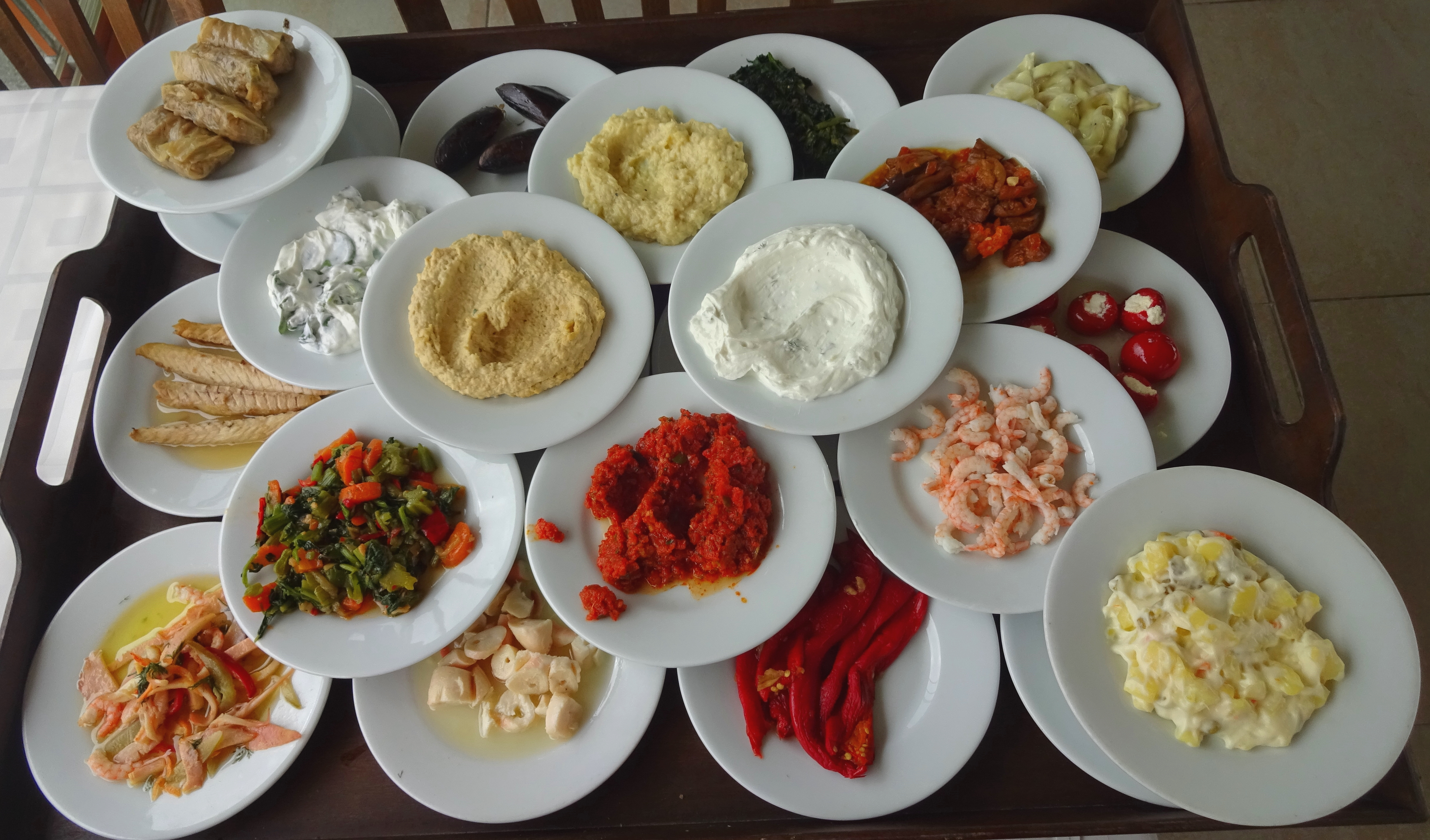
Meze on display in Adalar, Turkey

Small plates is a manner of dining that became popular in US food service after 2000. Small plates may refer either to small dishes resembling appetizers which are ordered à la carte and often shared, such as tapas, or to the small courses served as part of a more formal meal.

== Types ==
Some types of small plates which have influenced the modern US concept are:

- Tapas, a wide variety of appetizers in Spanish cuisine
- Mezze, a wide variety of appetizers in Turkish cuisine, and sometimes in Greek cuisine
- Antipasti and cicchetti in Italian cuisine
- Banchan, in Korean cuisine
- Sozai (Japanese: 惣菜), the small and usually shared dishes served at an izakaya, a Japanese pub
- The pu pu platter of Hawaiian cuisine
- Zakuski in Russian cuisine
- Side dish (Chinese: 小菜, which literally translates to "small dish") in Chinese cuisine
