= Seastar Bakery =

Defunct bakery in Portland, Oregon, US

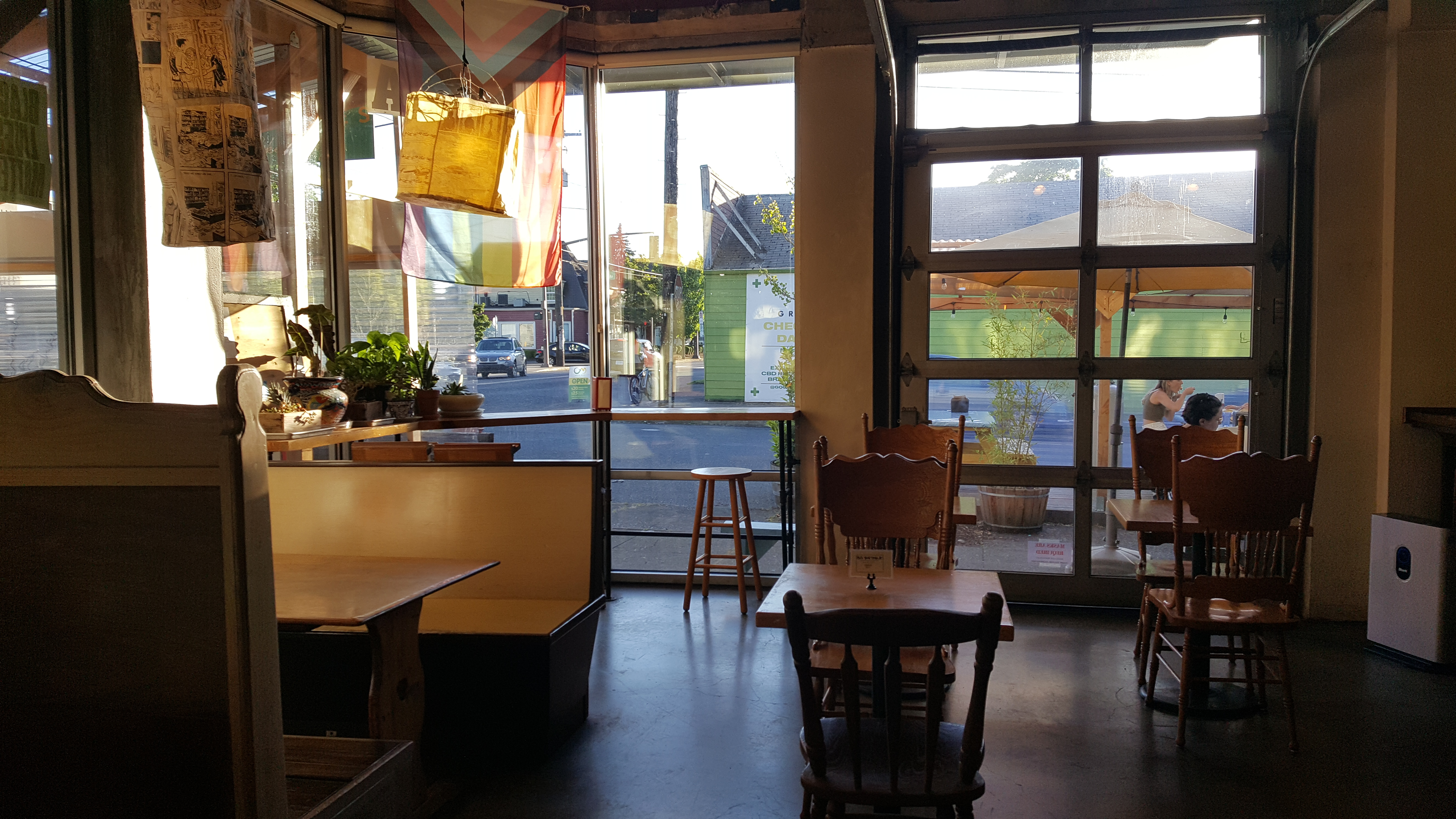
- The bakery's interior, 2022
- Interactive map of Seastar Bakery

Restaurant information
- Closed: August 14, 2022
- Owners: Katia Bezerra-Clark; Will Fain; Annie Moss
- Location: 1603 Northeast Killingsworth Street, Portland, Multnomah, Oregon, 97211, United States
- Coordinates: 45.5629°N 122.6489°W
- Website: seastarbakery.com/index.html

Seastar Bakery was a bakery in Portland, Oregon, United States. Annie Moss and Katia Bezerra-Clark owned and operated the business, which shared a space with Handsome Pizza in northeast Portland's Vernon neighborhood starting in 2015. Seastar served breads, cookies, pastries, and toast, among other baked goods. Despite garnering a positive reception and being deemed one of the city's best bakeries by Eater Portland and Portland Monthly, Seastar closed in August 2022.

== Description ==
Seastar Bakery shared a space with Handsome Pizza in the One Stop Building in northeast Portland's Vernon neighborhood. The businesses used a custom wood-fired oven built by Hot Rock Masonry of Eastsound, Washington.

Seastar's menu included breads (challah, rosemary cornbread, rye, sourdough), cookies, English muffins, pastries, buckwheat scones, and toast. Toast toppings included fruit, coconut-honey butter, and honey-nut butter, as well as coppa, pickles, and fried egg. In 2019, Willamette Week said, "Starting in the morning, Seastar Bakery makes pizza-dough-muffin breakfast sandwiches, plus obscure-grain pastries and fancy toasts so fancy they almost don't seem like toast anymore—using spelt and cornbread and rye and something called kamut-sesame, made with grain first discovered in the tombs of the Pharaohs."

According to Eater Portland, Seastar used "Pacific Northwestern flours and Oregon produce in its flavorful breads, chewy cookies, and ultra-flaky cinnamon rolls", as well as herbs and spices in its baked goods, such as sage in a glaze for the molasses cookie and turmeric for muffins. The bakery used Camas Country Mill flour for croissants. In 2021, Seastar served chai lattes on weekends. The drink menu also included coffee, hot chocolate, and tea.

== History ==
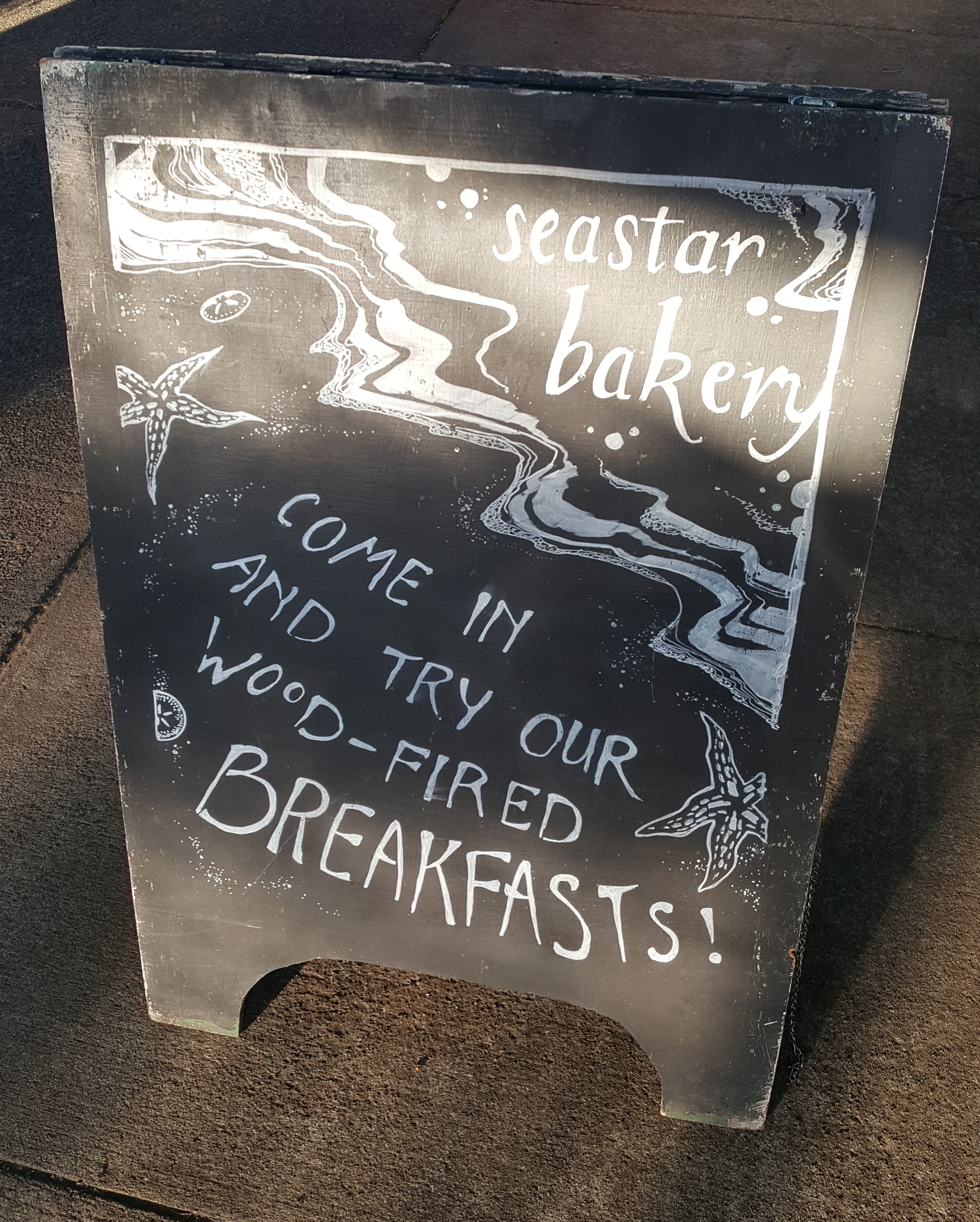
Exterior sign, 2022

Katia Bezerra-Clark and Annie Moss, who were friends and colleagues at Tabor Bread, owned and operated Seastar with Will Fain of Handsome Pizza starting in 2015. Fain had previously operated Handsome Pizza at the North Station food cart pod from 2011 to January 2015. Property development of the site caused him to relocate a few blocks east.

In January 2017, Seastar and twenty other female-owned businesses collaborated on cookie boxes, raising funds for Planned Parenthood ahead of Donald Trump's inauguration.

In 2020, during the COVID-19 pandemic, Seastar stocked baking ingredients such as eggs, flour, and yeast. The bakery reportedly sold 600 pounds of Camas Country Mill flour in two days in April 2020. Seastar was open for take-out and outdoor dining during the pandemic, but owners did not allow indoor dining until all staff were vaccinated. Face masks were still required, as of April 2022.

In 2022, owners announced plans to close on August 14. The pizzeria No Saint moved into the space which had housed both Seastar and Handsome Pizza.

== Reception ==
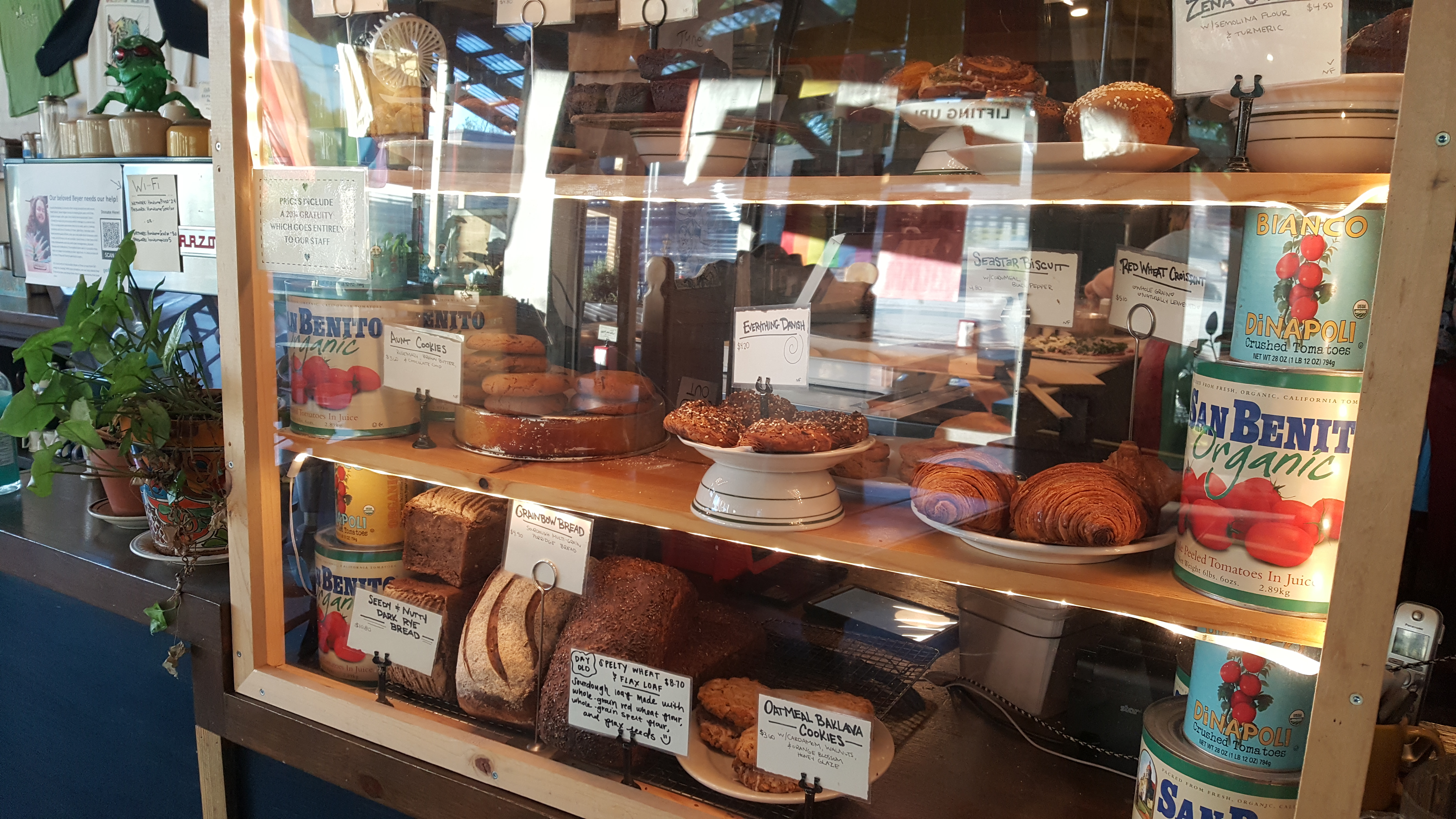
Interior display case, 2022

In 2017, Samantha Bakall included the fancy toast Little Beirut in The Oregonian's "cheap eats" list of "99 delicious dishes for $10 and under". Michelle Lopez included the Patsy's Biscuit in Eater Portland's 2018 list of fifteen biscuits in the city "that would make any Southerner proud". The website's Nick Townsend included the bakery in a 2021 list of eleven eateries for "charming" chai lattes in Portland. He described the chai latte as a "hidden gem on the menu" that is "distinctly peppery and restrained in its sweetness". Lopez and Brooke Jackson-Glidden included Seastar in a 2022 list of "outstanding" bakeries in the Portland metropolitan area.

Portland Monthly included Seastar in a 2022 "opinionated guide" to the city's best bakeries. Katherine Chew Hamilton wrote, "These grain-centric baked goods are part free-spirited Portland and part French finesse, united by a love for butter." She, Matthew Trueherz, and Karen Brooks also said, "Restaurant industry burnout is a real thing... We'll remember [Seastar Bakery and Handsome Pizza] for pastries including the turmeric Zena cakes, cinnamon rolls, and apricot-cardamom tarts, while pizza toppings ranged from ricotta to za’atar, plus pay-what-you-can cheese pies."

== See also ==
- List of bakeries
