= Mestizo (disambiguation) =

A mestizo is a person with mixed Spanish and Indigenous ancestry in the former Spanish Empire.

Mestizo may also refer to:

- Mestizo (rapper) (born 1981), American rapper
- Mestizo (restaurant), a restaurant in Portland, Oregon, United States
- Mestizo (Daniel Valdez album), 1973
- Mestizo (Joe Bataan album), 1980
- Mestizzo, a Mexican pop band
