= Javelina (restaurant) =

Restaurant in Portland, Oregon, U.S.

- Interactive map of Javelina

Restaurant information
- Established: November 12, 2023
- Owners: Alexa Numkena-Anderson; Nicholas Numkena-Anderson
- Chef: Alexa Numkena-Anderson
- Food type: Indigenous
- Location: Portland, Multnomah, Oregon, United States
- Coordinates: 45.5572°N 122.6204°W

Javelina is a restaurant in Portland, Oregon, United States. Chef Alexa Numkena-Anderson and her husband Nicholas Numkena-Anderson launched the business as a pop-up in November 2023, initially serving meals at Morchella in northeast Portland's Sabin neighborhood. It began operating at Lil' Dame in January 2025. It is the city's only Native American restaurant as of 2023.

== Description ==
The restaurant Javelina serves pre-colonial and post-colonial cuisine. Javelina's logo depicts a rainbow-colored javelina, a pig-like ungulate.

== History ==
Javelina was launched by chef Alexa Numkena-Anderson and her husband Nicholas Numkena-Anderson, who manages front-of-house operations. The restaurant's menu reflects her Indigenous and Mexican heritage. The restaurant's first meal was served at Morchella, in northeast Portland's Sabin neighborhood, on November 12, 2023. The business is among several Indigenous-owned and operated restaurants in the Pacific Northwest serving Native American cuisines in recent years, and has been described as Portland's only Native American restaurant.

Javelina has been a vendor at the Portland Indigenous Marketplace. In 2024, Javelina was featured on Oregon Public Broadcasting's food series Superabundant.

Javelina moved into a brick and mortar location at Lil' Dame on January 23, 2025. In March, owners announced plans to leave Lil' Dame early and relocate to Northeast 42nd Avenue in the Cully neighborhood in May.

== Reception ==
Oregon Public Broadcasting has said that Javelina "blends Indigenous comfort foods and non-colonial ingredients creating a uniquely Indigenous fine dining experience". Andrea Damewood included Javelina in the Portland Mercury's overview of the "best bites" from restaurants and pop-ups in Portland in 2023. Eater Portland's Zoe Baillargeon included Javelina in a 2025 list of the city's best new restaurants and food carts. Alex Frane included the business in Portland Monthly's 2025 list of restaurant opening that defined the city in 2025.
