= Handsome Pizza =

Defunct pizzeria in Portland, Oregon, US

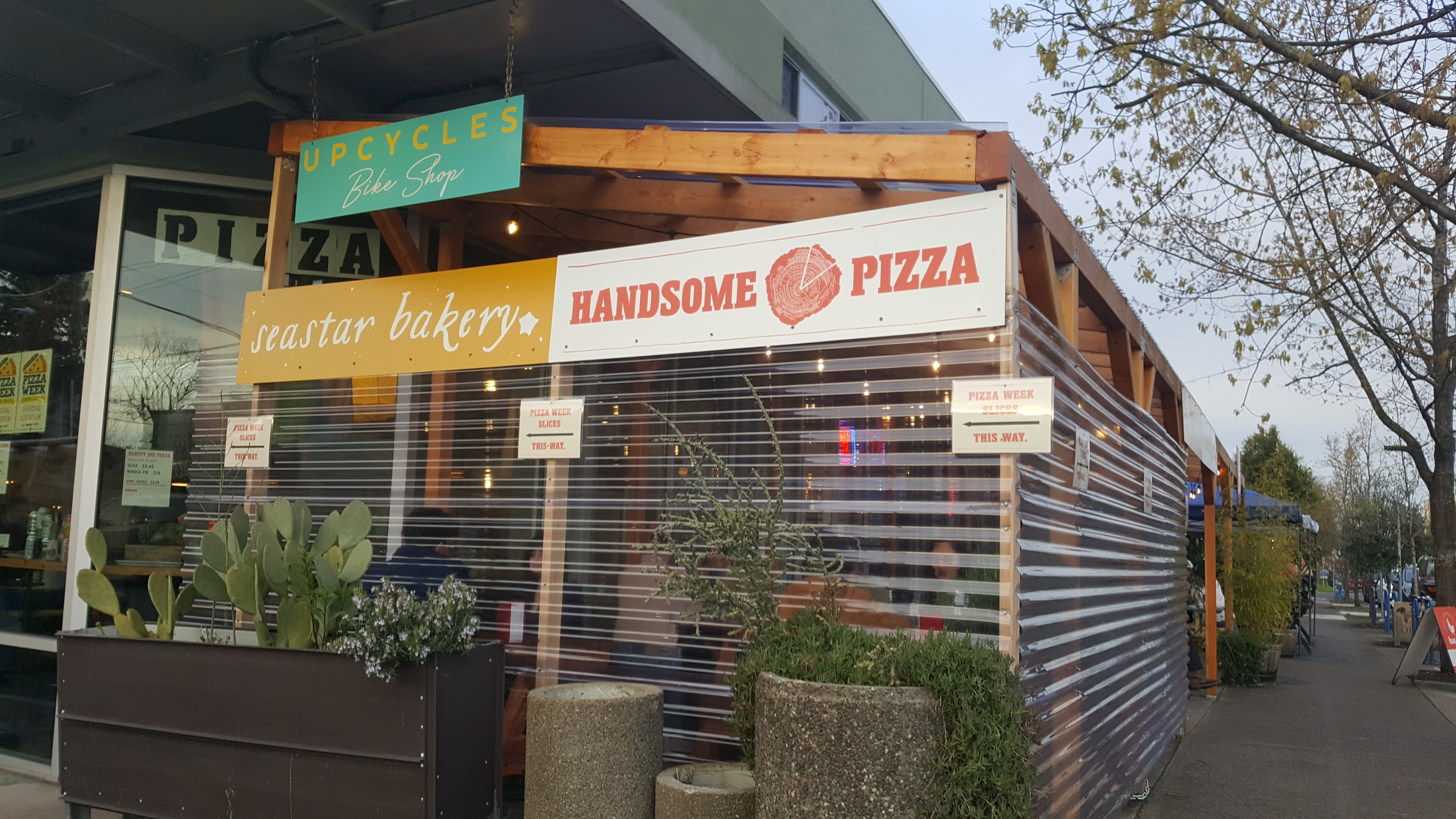
- Exterior and covered seating, 2022
- Interactive map of Handsome Pizza

Restaurant information
- Established: 2012
- Closed: August 14, 2022
- Food type: Pizza
- Location: 1603 Northeast Killingsworth Street, Portland, Multnomah, Oregon, 97211, United States
- Coordinates: 45.5628°N 122.6489°W
- Website: handsomeseastar.com

Handsome Pizza was a pizzeria in Portland, Oregon. Established in 2012, the business closed in August 2022.

== Description ==
The pizzeria was located on Killingsworth Street in northeast Portland's Vernon neighborhood and shared a space with Seastar Bakery. Handsome's pizzas were "New York-Neapolitan hybrids" and featured sourdough crusts, baked in a custom-built, wood-fired oven.

== History ==
Will Fain acquired the Pizza Depokos cart in 2011 and rebranded the business as Handsome Pizza in 2012. The restaurant operated from a garage in north Portland, until relocating to Killingsworth in August 2015. During a gap between the two locations, Handsome hosted a series of pop-ups at the bakery Tabor Bread. In 2020, fifteen employees were laid off because of the impact of the COVID-19 pandemic. In 2022, owners announced plans to close on August 14. The pizzeria No Saint moved into the space.

== Reception ==
Michael Russell included Handsome in The Oregonian's 2016 list of Portland's best new restaurants. The newspaper's Samantha Bakall included the pizzeria in a list of Portland's best wood-fired pizza. In 2018, Russell ranked Handsome number five in a list of Portland's top ten pizzerias, and number six in a list of the city's best pizza by the slice. In 2021, Brooke Jackson-Glidden included Handsome in Eater Portland's overview of eateries for "exceptional" pizzas in the city and said the "hyper-seasonal specials are often stunners".

== See also ==
- Pizza in Portland, Oregon
