= No Saint (restaurant) =

Pizzeria in Portland, Oregon, U.S.

- Interactive map of No Saint

Restaurant information
- Established: 2019
- Owners: Gabriella Casabianca; Anthony Siccardi
- Food type: Italian (pizza)
- Location: 1603 Northeast Killingsworth Street, Portland, Multnomah, Oregon, 97211, United States
- Coordinates: 45.5628°N 122.6489°W
- Website: nosaintpdx.com

No Saint is a pizzeria in Portland, Oregon, United States. Spouses Gabriella Casabianca and Anthony Siccardi launched the business as a pop-up in 2019, before moving into a brick and mortar space in 2022. The restaurant has garnered a positive reception.

== Description ==
No Saint is a pizzeria on Killingsworth Street in northeast Portland's Vernon neighborhood. The restaurant's interior has a wood-fired oven. The Pepperoni Supreme pizza has pepperoni, garlic, red onion, pepperoncini, mozzarella, ricotta, and honey. In addition to pizza, No Saint has served trenne à la vodka, calamari salad, Campari cake, spinach lasagnetta, and brassicas.

== History ==
Spouses Gabriella Casabianca and Anthony Siccardi are co-owners. The business started as a pop-up, offering small plates at Vivienne in 2019 and pizza at Dame Collective in April 2020. In 2022, No Saint moved into a brick and mortar space previously occupied by Handsome Pizza and Seastar Bakery.

No Saint began offering daytime service in March 2024.

== Reception ==
In 2023, The Oregonian ranked No Saint number seven in a list of Portland's best new restaurants, and included the business in a list of the city's five best new pizzerias. The newspaper's Michael Russell also included the rigatoncini a la vodka in an overview of the city's best new dishes of 2023. The Oregonian's Julie Evensen called the pizza "inventive" in a 2024 list of seven pizza "favorites to try" in Portland. The business ranked fourth in the best restaurant category of the newspaper's annual Readers Choice Awards in 2025.

In 2023, Waz Wu included No Saint in Eater Portland's overview of recommended vegan pizza eateries in the city, and Nathan Williams included the business in a list of seventeen "stellar" bars and restaurants on Northeast Killingsworth. The website's Brooke Jackson-Glidden wrote, "The produce is super seasonal, and the flavor combinations are always really interesting."

== See also ==
- List of Italian restaurants
- Pizza in Portland, Oregon
