= Pasture PDX =

Defunct butcher shop and delicatessen in Portland, Oregon, U.S.

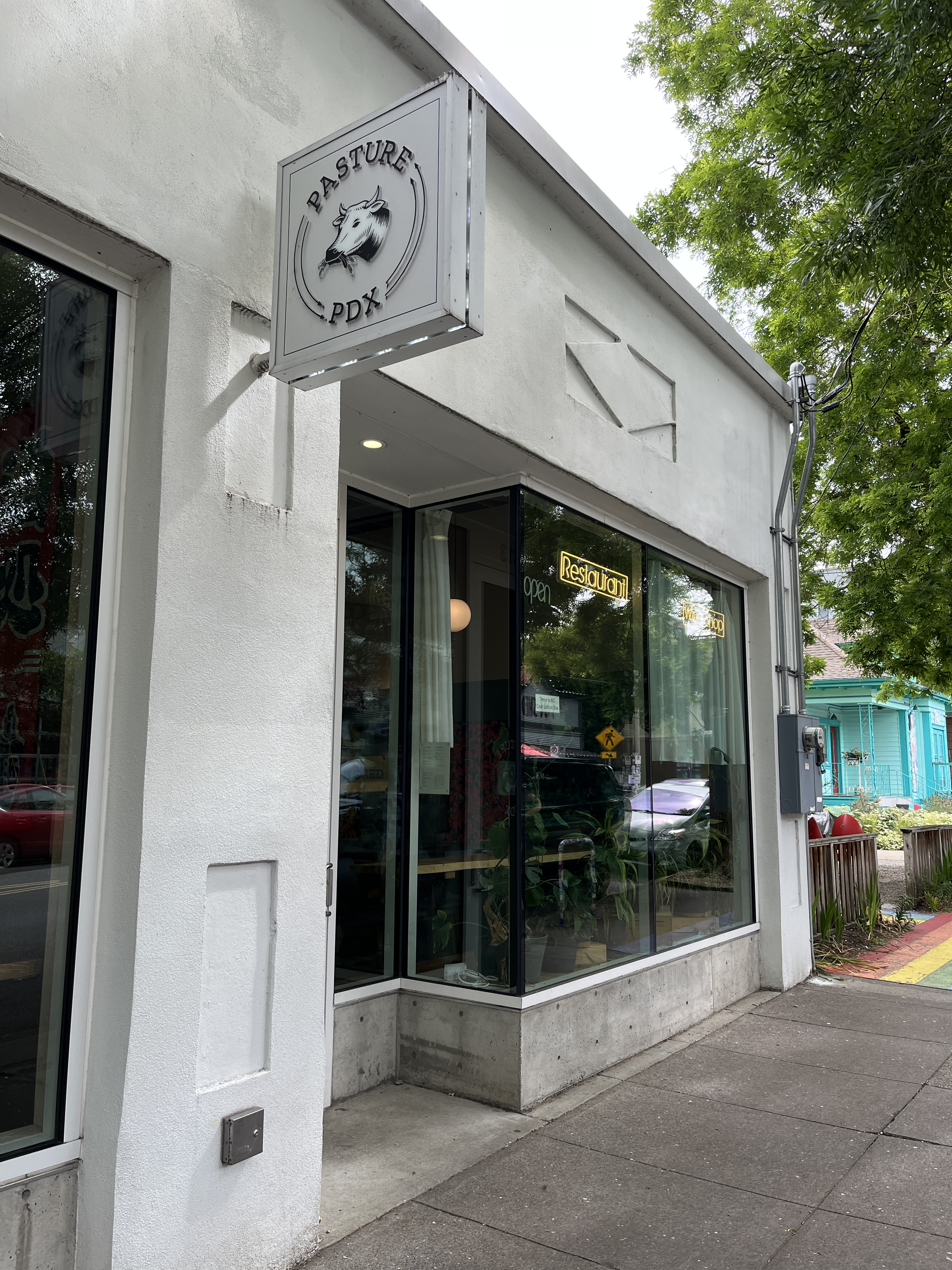
- The shop's exterior, 2025
- Interactive map of Pasture PDX

Restaurant information
- Owners: Kei Ohdera; HJ Schaible
- Location: Portland, Multnomah, Oregon, United States
- Coordinates: 45.5593°N 122.6515°W
- Website: pasturepdx.com

Pasture PDX, or simply Pasture, was a butcher shop and delicatessen in Portland, Oregon's Alberta Arts District, in the United States. Kei Ohdera and HJ Schaible were co-owners. Pasture garnered a positive reception and was named one of Portland's best new restaurants of 2022 by The Oregonian.

== Description ==
Pasture operated on Alberta Street in northeast Portland's King neighborhood. It was described as a whole animal butchery and restaurant. The menu varied depending on the season and weather, and had included roast beef sandwiches with cheddar, pastrami Reubens with carrot thousand island, and beef mortadella with pickled peppers. The shop sold curated boxes of goods. Foods were sourced from Oregon farmers and ranchers.

== History ==
The business was owned by Kei Ohdera and HJ Schaible. It initially operated as a pop-up restaurant, including stints at Dame Collective in 2019 and the now-defunct Tails & Trotters in 2021. Plans for Pasture to start operating from a brick and mortar location were announced in 2021.

== Reception ==
Pasture ranked seventh in The Oregonian's list of Portland's best new restaurants of 2022. The newspaper's Michael Russell said the business was the city's best new sandwich shop. Alex Frane and Janey Wong included Pasture in Eater Portland's 2023 list of nineteen "excellent" sandwich shops in the city.

== See also ==
- List of butcher shops
- List of defunct restaurants of the United States
- List of delicatessens
