= Dame Collective =

Restaurant collective in Portland, Oregon, U.S.

Logo

Dame Collective was a restaurant collective in Portland, Oregon, United States. It occupied multiple spaces.

== History ==
According to Willamette Week, "Dame, which opened in 2016 as a wine bar with a traditional restaurant, shifted its model in 2019 following the departure of opening chef Eli Dahlin. Owner Jane Smith and Paley's Place veteran Patrick McKee launched Estes + Dame as a popup, then launched Dame as a full-fledged restaurant." Dame Collective closed permanently on December 31, 2025.

Businesses at Dame included:

- Bialy Bird
- Chelo
- Ma Cher
- Matcha Freak
- No Saint
- Pasture PDX

Businesses at Lil' Dame included

- Bajala
- Chelo
- Clandestino
- Javelina
- Le Clown
- Matta
