= Mestizo (restaurant) =

Latin American restaurant in Portland, Oregon, U.S.

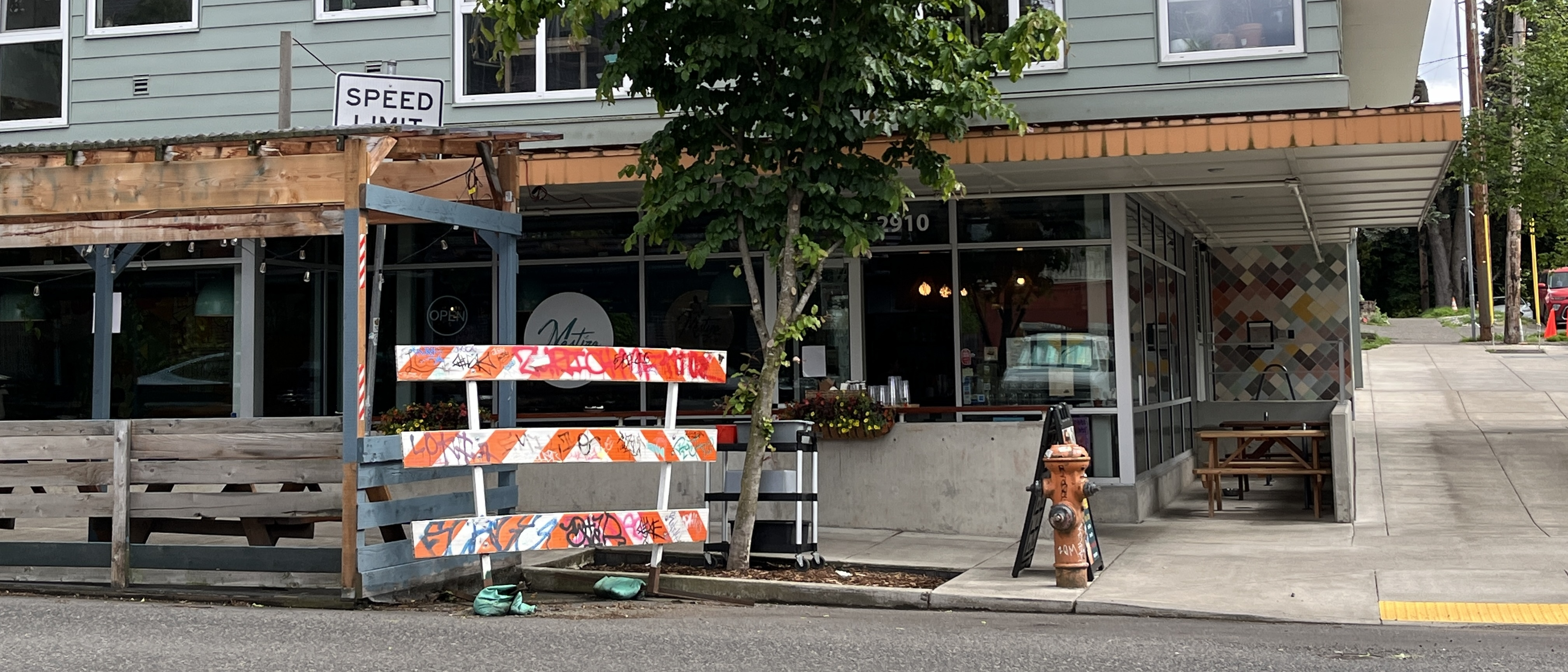
- The restaurant's exterior in 2025
- Interactive map of Mestizo

Restaurant information
- Established: 2019
- Owner: Ketsuda "Nan" Chaison
- Food type: Latin American
- Location: 2910 Southeast Division Street, Portland, Multnomah, Oregon, 97202, United States
- Coordinates: 45.5047°N 122.6355°W
- Website: mestizopdx.com

Mestizo is a Latin American restaurant in Portland, Oregon, United States. Originally a pop-up restaurant, the business has operated in a brick and mortar space in southeast Portland's Richmond neighborhood since 2019. The business has hosted various pop-ups, including Chelo and HeyDay.

== Description ==
The gluten-and-soy-free Latin American (or pan-Latin) restaurant Mestizo operates on Division Street in southeast Portland's Richmond neighborhood. Brooke Jackson-Glidden of Eater Portland wrote, "Inside, the space feels summery, with pops of oceanic blue tile, raw stone work throughout the space, and a large blue, grey, and orange mural incorporating design elements of Portland and Latin America." The website has also described Mestizo as a pescatarian and "red-meat-free" restaurant with a "cool, breezy" interior.

The menu has included banana flower tacos, empanadas with Beyond Meat, shrimp ceviche, and a mezcal-focused drink menu. Tacos have coleslaw, coconut crema, and orange habanero sauce. The restaurant has also served carne asada, chicken tinga, fried calamari and oysters, langostino, mushroom pozole, tuna tostones, and yuca fries with mojo aoili. Various rice and salad bowls are served with black beans, corn, Haitian pikliz, tomatoes, yams, and chipotle aioli. Drink options have included Brazilian caipirinhas, margaritas, palomas, and Peruvian pisco sours. The Sacsayhumán has habanero-infused vodka and passion fruit purée. Non-alcoholic drink have ingredients like leche de tigre and pineapple juice.

== History ==
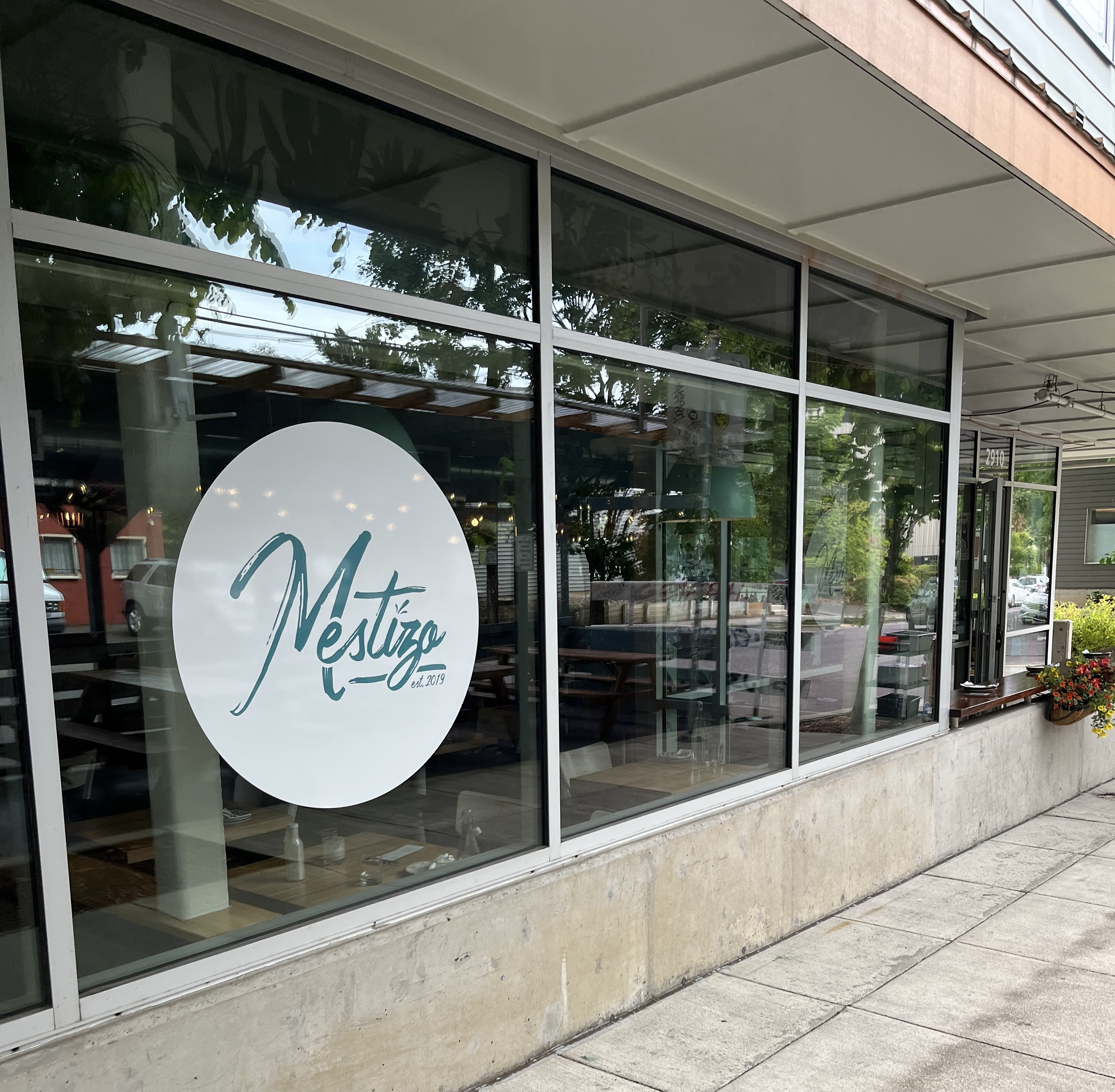
The restaurant's exterior, 2025

The business started as a pop-up restaurant. In September 2019, Jackson-Glidden described plans for Mestizo to open on November 15. The restaurant opened in November 30. Ketsuda "Nan" Chaison is a co-founder and an owner. Mestizo has hosted various pop-ups, including Chelo, HeyDay, Kumare, Mitate, Plant Based Papi, Tikim, and Tume.

Like many restaurants, the business faced challenges during the COVID-19 pandemic. In 2022, Mestizo was featured in Yelp's "Turn the Tables" campaign, which highlighted "businesses that pivoted to face the newfound challenges" of the pandemic, according to the Portland Business Journal.

Libre, Norah, and Phaya have been described as sibling establishments to Mestizo.

== Reception ==
Jenni Moore included Mestizo in Eater Portland's 2020 overview of thirteen "standout" vegetarian meals in the city. She also included the business in a 2022 overview of the metropolitan area's best fish tacos. Waz Wu included Mestizo in the website's 2023 list of the city's "primo special occasion" restaurants for vegetarians and vegans. Maya MacEvoy and Nathan Williams included the business in Eater Portland's 2023 overview of the city's best ceviche. The website's Zoe Baillargeon included Mestizo in a 2025 list of the best restaurants along Division Street. Sararosa Davies included the business in the website's 2025 overview of the city's best gluten-free bakeries and restaurants.

Mestizo placed second in the Best Gluten-Free Restaurant category of Willamette Week's annual 'Best of Portland' readers' poll in 2024. The restaurant was a finalist in the same category in 2025.

== See also ==
- Hispanics and Latinos in Portland, Oregon
