= Tabor Bread =

Bakery in Portland, Oregon, U.S.

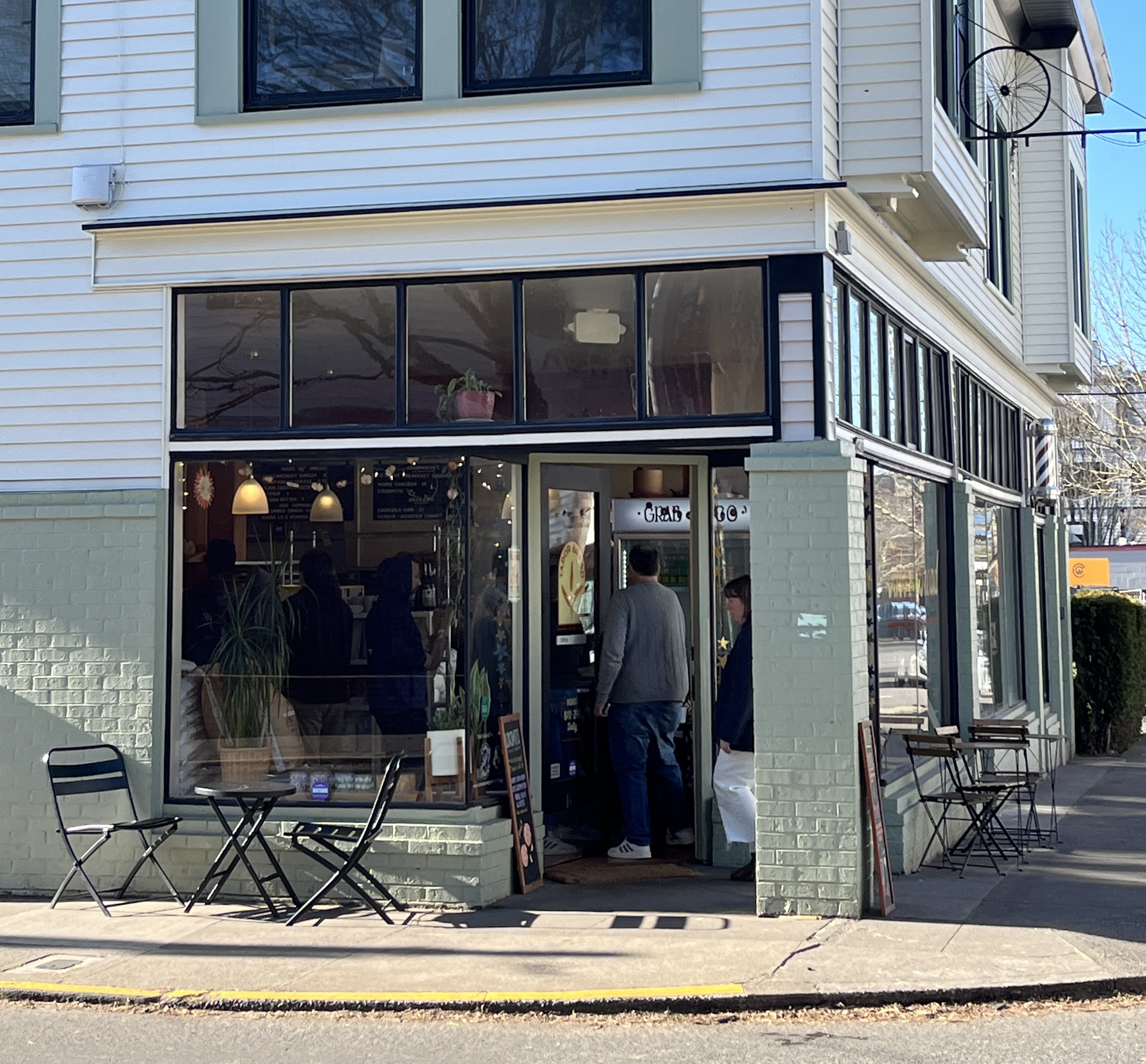
- The shop's exterior in 2025
- Interactive map of Tabor Bread

Restaurant information
- Established: 2012
- Owner: Rebecca Tosdevin
- Previous owner: Tissa Stein
- Chef: Rebecca Tosdevin
- Location: 4438 Southeast Belmont Street, Portland, Multnomah, Oregon, 97215, United States
- Coordinates: 45.5164°N 122.6162°W
- Website: taborbread.com

Tabor Bread is a bakery and restaurant in Portland, Oregon's Sunnyside neighborhood, in the United States. Tissa Stein began operating the business at the intersection of 50th and Hawthorne Boulevard in 2012, then relocated to Belmont Street in 2022. Rebecca Tosdevin has owned the bakery since 2022, following Stein's retirement. The bakery has garnered a positive reception.

== Description ==
Tabor Bread is a bakery and cafe on Belmont Street in southeast Portland's Sunnyside neighborhood. Originally, the business operated at the intersection of 50th and Hawthorne Boulevard. The bakery used a wood-fired oven in its original location on Hawthorne, and has hosted tango events. Tabor Bread serves breakfast, brunch, lunch, dinner, and snacks.

=== Menu ===
In addition to whole grain breads (including sourdough), the bakery serves pastries like muffins, scones, shortbread, and sticky buns, as well as bread pudding, granola, salads, sandwiches, soups, and coffee. A writer for The New York Times described one sandwich with European-style dark rye bread, sheep's milk feta, sprouts, and tomato-onion jam.

Special items have included a baklava croissant and a rhubarb-mascarpone danish. The dinner menu includes einkorn cavatelli with chanterelles, bangers and mash (cannellini beans) with bay shrimp, and chicken and mushroom pie. The bakery has also served beer. Tabor Bread makes some of its own butters, jams, marmalades, and relishes.

== History ==
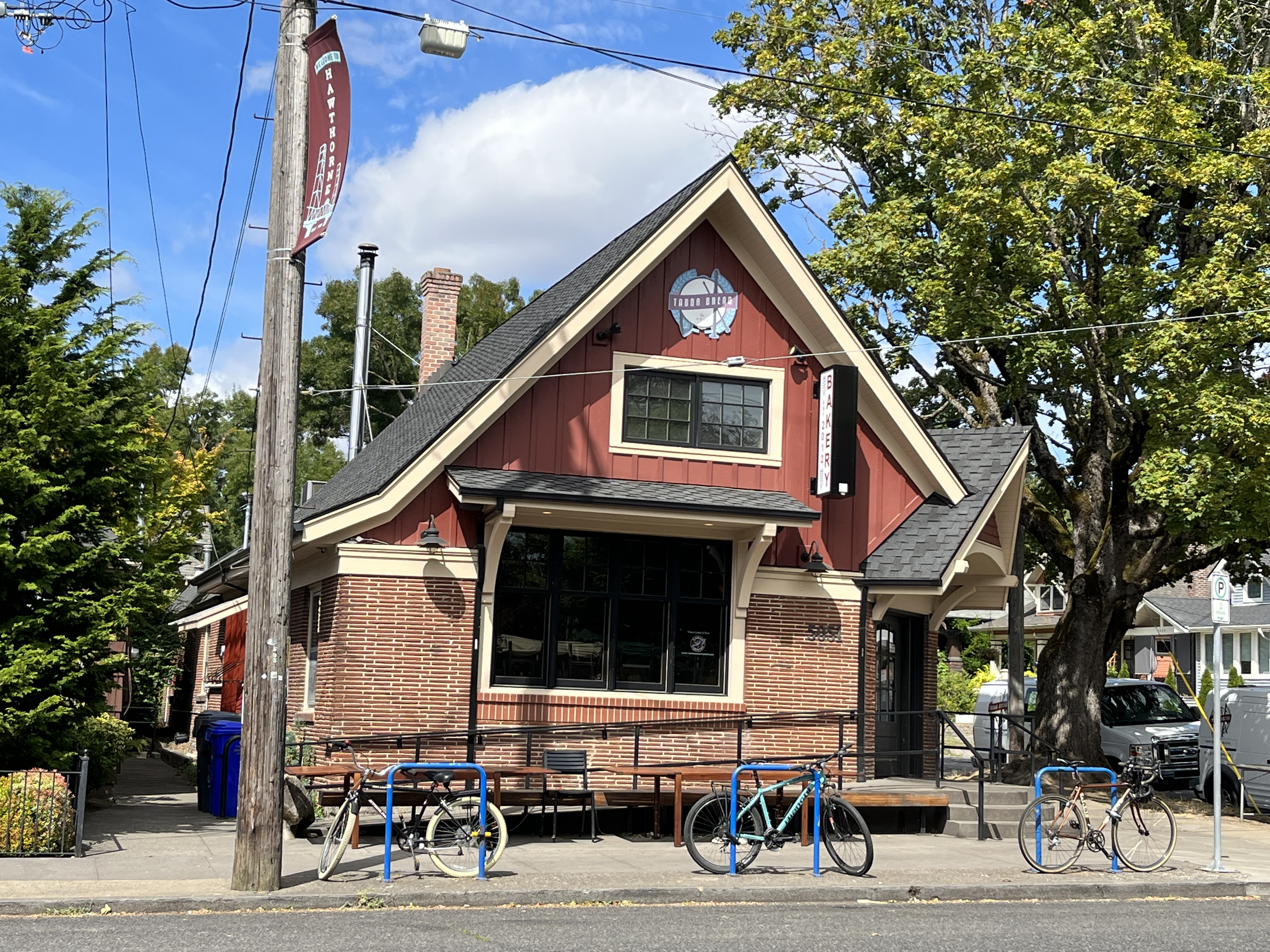
Exterior of the original location at the intersection of 50th and Hawthorne Boulevard in southeast Portland, 2022

Tissa Stein opened the bakery in November 2012, in a former medical office. According to Portland Monthly, Tabor Break was the city's first retail bakery to mill its own flour and bake breads using a wood-fired oven.

In 2015, Tabor Bread hosted a series of pop-ups by Handsome Pizza. After operating from a red brick house on Hawthorne Boulevard for approximately ten years, the business relocated to Belmont Street in 2022. Stein retired in 2023. Baker and manager Rebecca Tosdevin took over the business. Tabor Bread launched dinner service in mid October 2024, with José Sabas as chef.

== Reception ==
In a 2013 overview of Portland's bakeries, Alice Short of the Los Angeles Times recommended Tabor Bread's baguette, which she described as "just the right accompaniment for some butter and jam -- something warm and fuzzy to experience first thing in the morning". In The Oregonian's 2017 overview of ten "only-in-Portland dates that are both fun and cheap", Georgina Young-Ellis said Tabor Bread offered "the perfect relaxing day date". She said the bakery had a "cozy" atmosphere and the sourdough "will blow your mind". Michael Russell included the passion fruit cross laminated bun in the newspaper's list of Portland's ten best dishes of 2024.

Michelle Lopez included the business in Eater Portland's 2022 overview of recommended eateries in the city for croissants. Tabor Bread was a runner-up in the Best Bakery category of Willamette Week's annual 'Best of Portland' readers' poll in 2022. In Portland Monthly's 2024 "opinionated guide" to the city's best bakeries, Matthew Trueherz wrote: "The menu's guiding question is, Can you sourdough that? Most of the extensive bread and pastry list benefits from the funk, especially those with backbone, like the sweet tangy chocolate babka, and the rough-and-tumble Einkorn wheat loaf. If you appreciate a nice zing, the chocolate croissant is like no other, but not for the faint of heart. If sourdoughification isn't your jam, local grains take on the mantle, like rye in the brownies (totally works) and buckwheat in the chocolate chip cookies (not so much)."

== See also ==
- List of bakeries
