= Chelo (restaurant) =

Defunct Mexican restaurant in Portland, Oregon, U.S.

- Interactive map of Chelo

Restaurant information
- Established: 2016
- Owner: Luna Contreras
- Food type: Mexican
- Location: Portland, Multnomah, Oregon, United States
- Coordinates: 45°33′45.2″N 122°38′06.8″W
- Website: chelopdx.com

Chelo was a Mexican restaurant in Portland, Oregon, United States. It started as a pop-up restaurant in 2016 and closed in December 2025.

== Description ==
The Mexican restaurant and condiment business Chelo (sometimes Chelo PDX) operated in Portland, Oregon. The name was a tribute to the owner's grandmother, who operated a restaurant in Guadalajara and was nicknamed Chelo.

Chelo's menu included gorditas, tacos, tamales (including a version with confit duck and leek), tlayudas, tostadas, mole, and seasonal vegetables. The Mexican street corn salad had clams, cherry tomatoes, tajin seasoning, and crema. The squash tlayuda had peaches, shishitos, zucchini, manchego and black bean puree, and the almond tres leches cake was served with berry meringues and pandan cream.

The LGBTQ-owned restaurant sold hot sauces and other products such as azelnut salsa macha. The business' logo depicted a fox with a fluffy tail.

== History ==
Luna Contreras started Chelo as a pop-up in Renata's commissary kitchen in 2016. Chelo was on a hiatus, as of November 2020. In 2021, Contreras revived Chelo as a pop-up at the Filipino restaurant Magna Kusina. Chelo operated in Sibeiho on Northwest 23rd in 2022 and began operating from Dame Collective's Lil' Dame space in 2023. As of mid 2024, Chelo was increasing production of hot sauces for independent retailers in Portland and Seattle. Chelo began operating as a permanent restaurant on Killingsworth Street on January 3, 2025.

In 2024, Chelo's tlayudas were included in illustrator Rebecca Nguyen-Macalalad's "The Women of Portland Food" poster depicting dishes by female chefs in Portland. The wine shop Almacén Dámita began sharing a space with Chelo in 2025.

Chelo closed on December 19, 2025, ahead of Dame Collective's permanent closure on December 31.

== Reception ==
Shortly after Chelo opened at Dame Collective in 2023, Contreras was named Chef of the Year by Eater Portland. The website's Janey Wong wrote in part, "Even for folks who haven't had the chance to visit Chelo, Contreras is ubiquitous in the fabric of Portland's food scene — she's a staple at many of the city's biggest food events, her condiment line is stocked at fine food markets around town, and she's a vocal advocate for the trans community." In 2025, the website's Krista Garcia and Zoe Baillargeon included Chelo in overviews of Portland's best Mexican and best new restaurants and food carts, respectively.

Katherine Chew Hamilton of Portland Monthly included Chelo's chilaquiles rellenos in a list of the city's ten best dishes of 2023. The magazine's Karen Brooks called the menu "playful" and Victoria Leandra of HuffPost called the food "nostalgic, yet innovative".

== See also ==
- Hispanics and Latinos in Portland, Oregon
- LGBTQ culture in Portland, Oregon
- List of defunct restaurants of the United States
- List of Mexican restaurants
