= Morchella (restaurant) =

Restaurant in Portland, Oregon, U.S.

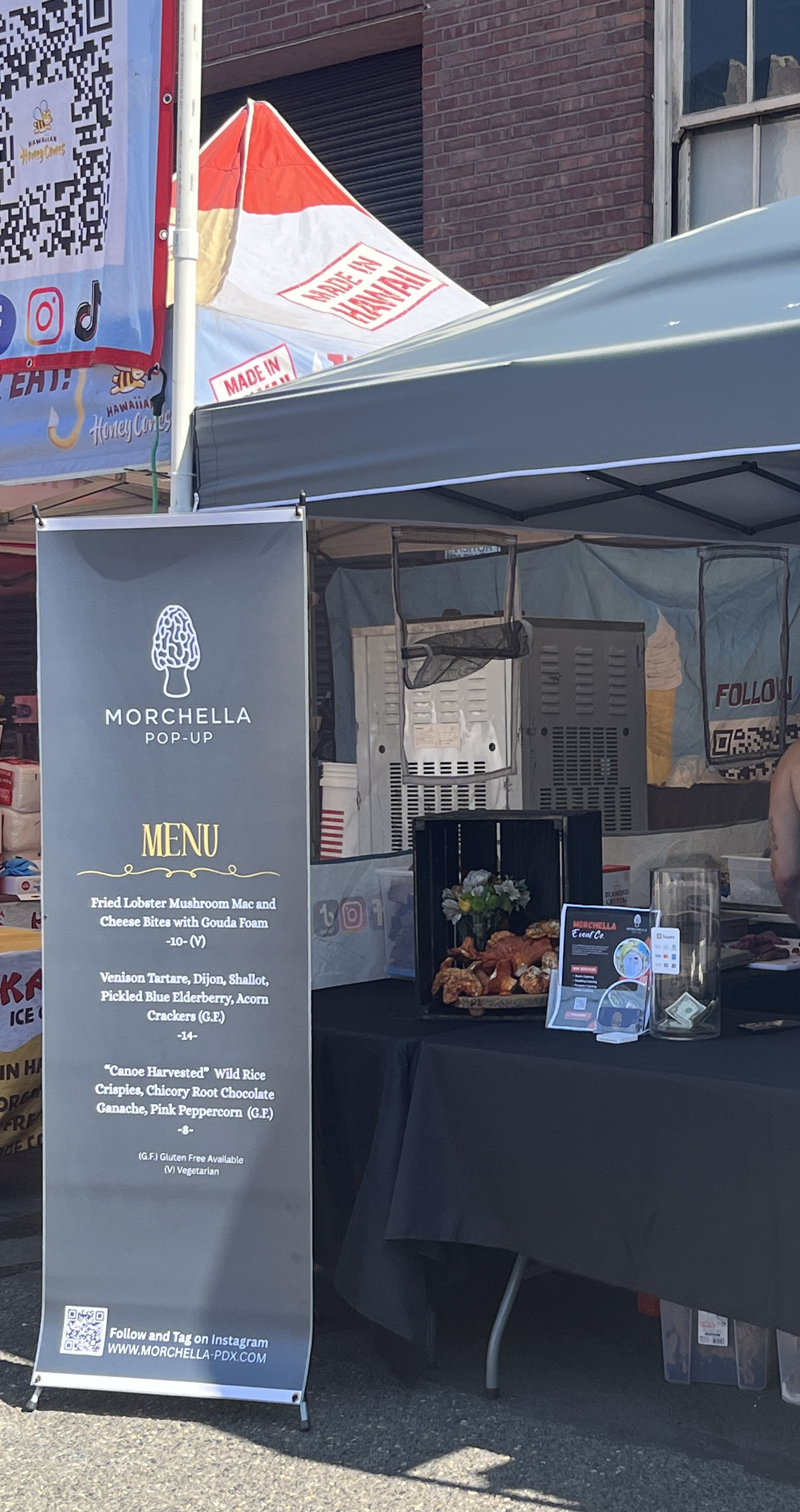
- Morchella's stand at Snack Fest, 2025
- Interactive map of Morchella

Restaurant information
- Established: 2021
- Chef: Cameron Dunlap
- Food type: New American
- Location: 1315 Northeast Fremont Street, Portland, Multnomah, Oregon, 97212, United States
- Coordinates: 45.5483°N 122.6524°W
- Website: morchella-pdx.com

Morchella is a restaurant in Portland, Oregon's Sabin neighborhood, in the United States. Chef Cameron Dunlap opened the fine dining establishment in 2021, serving forage-focused New American cuisine.

== Description ==
Named after the genus of fungi, Morchella is a fine dining restaurant in northeast Portland's Sabin neighborhood. The New American menu highlights mushrooms and includes pastas, soups, dandelion greens on venison steak, endives with walnuts and wild rice, and ice cream with wild berries. Proteins include fish, pheasant, quail, and venison. The restaurant also uses figs.

== History ==
Morchella opened in 2021, in the space that previously housed Verdigris. Cameron Dunlap is the chef, and Rain Grey is the chef de cuisine. In 2023, Dunlap and Morchella were featured in a dinner hosted by Tasting Collective, a members-only dining club. hosted a vegan "seaweed extravaganza" in collaboration with two other businesses. The event's five-course meal featured Pacific Ocean-grown seaweed in each course. Morchella has hosted Javelina as a pop-up restaurant.

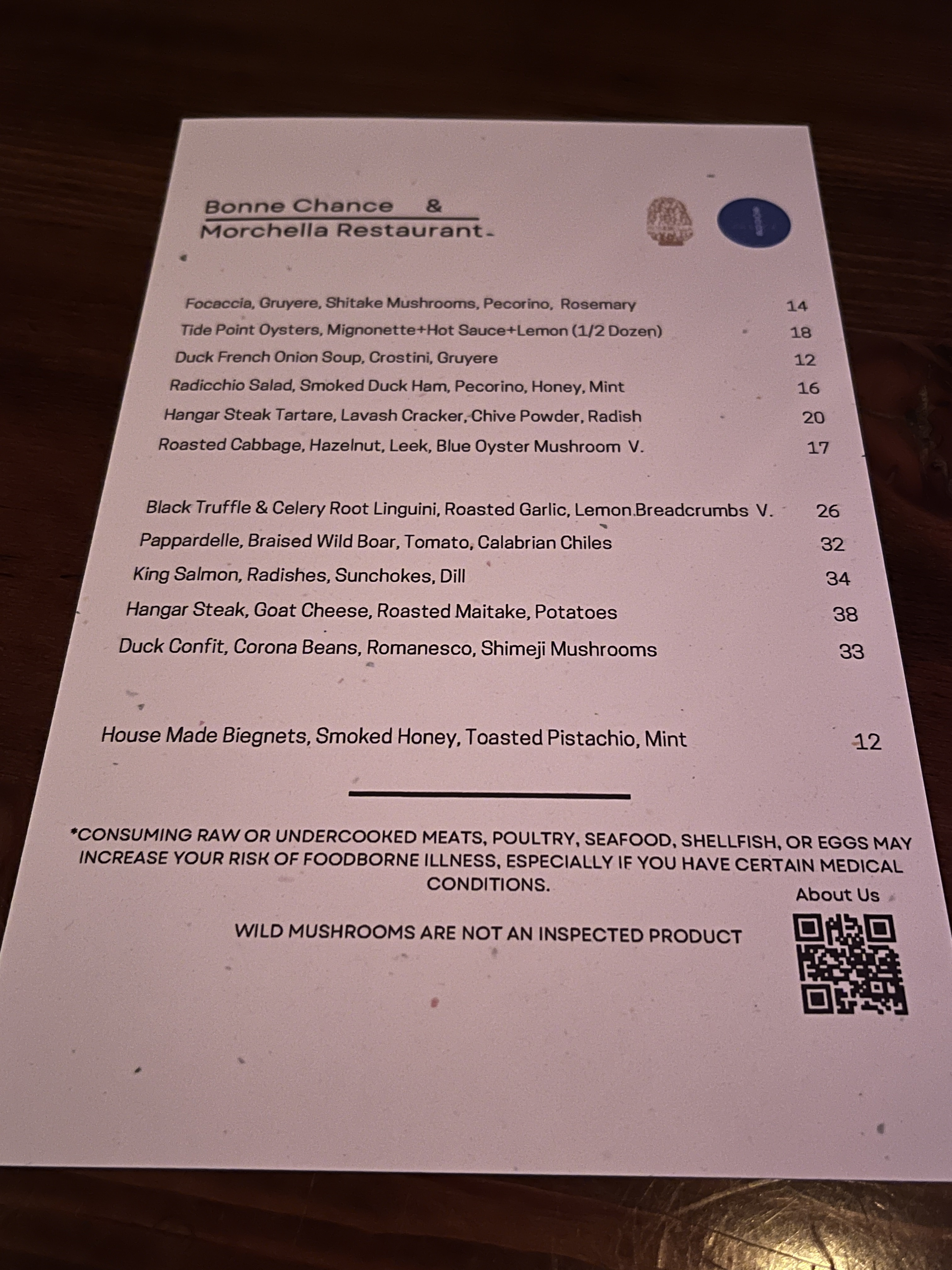
Menu for Morchella at Bonne Chance

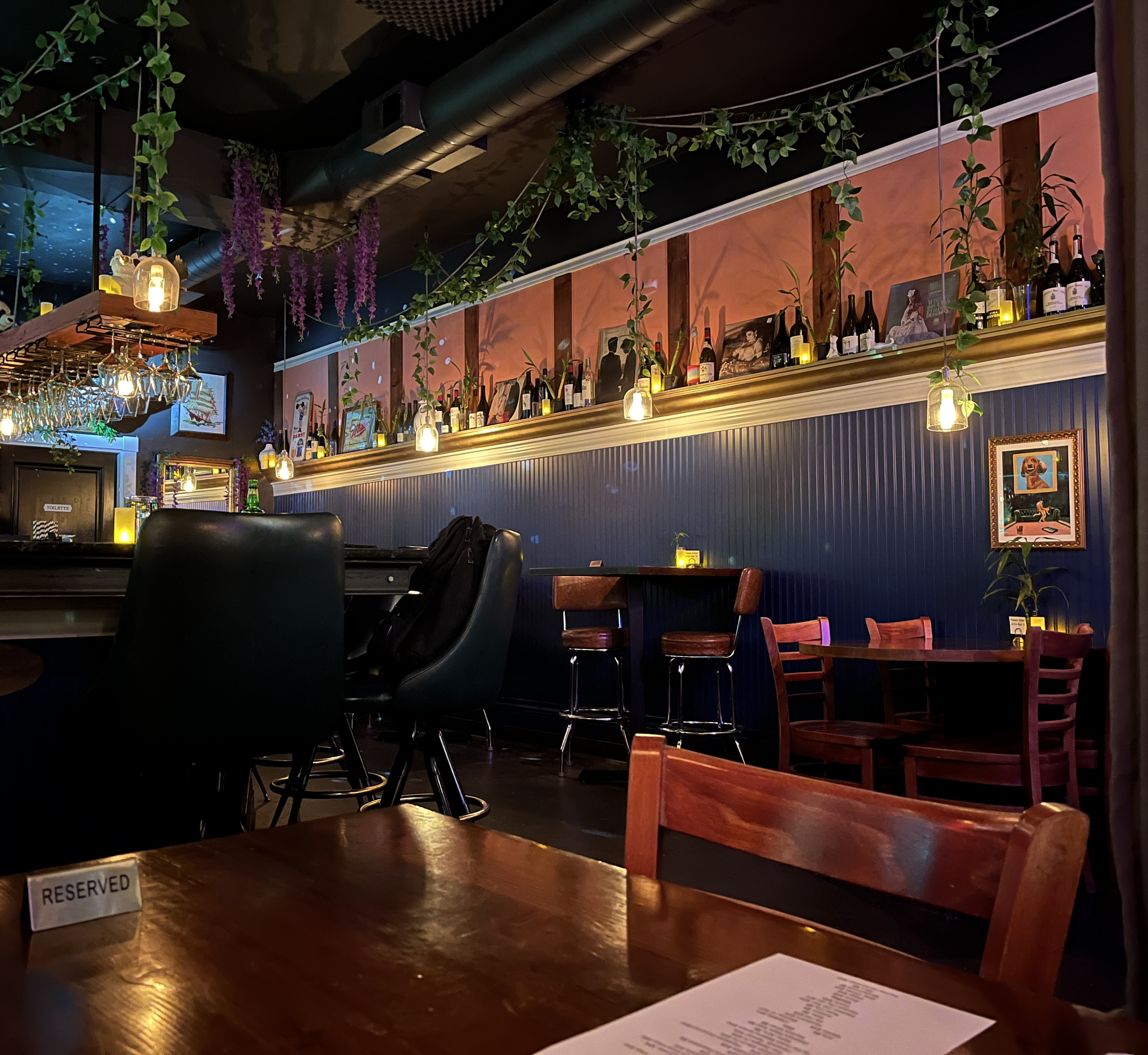
Interior of Bonne Chance

== Reception ==
Morchella was included in Bon Appétit's list of the 50 best new restaurants of 2022.

== See also ==
- List of New American restaurants
