= List of defunct restaurants in Portland, Oregon =

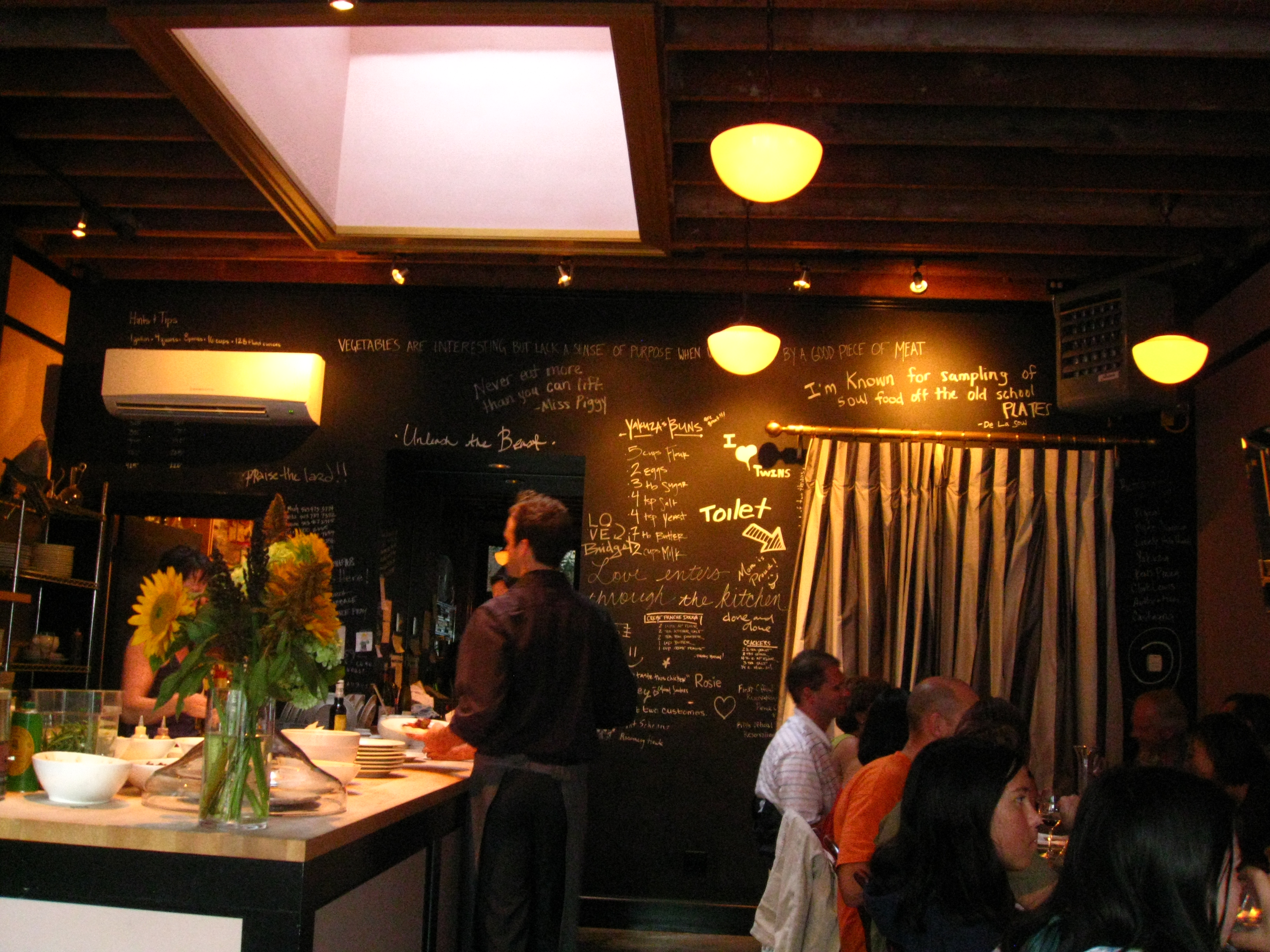
Interior of Beast

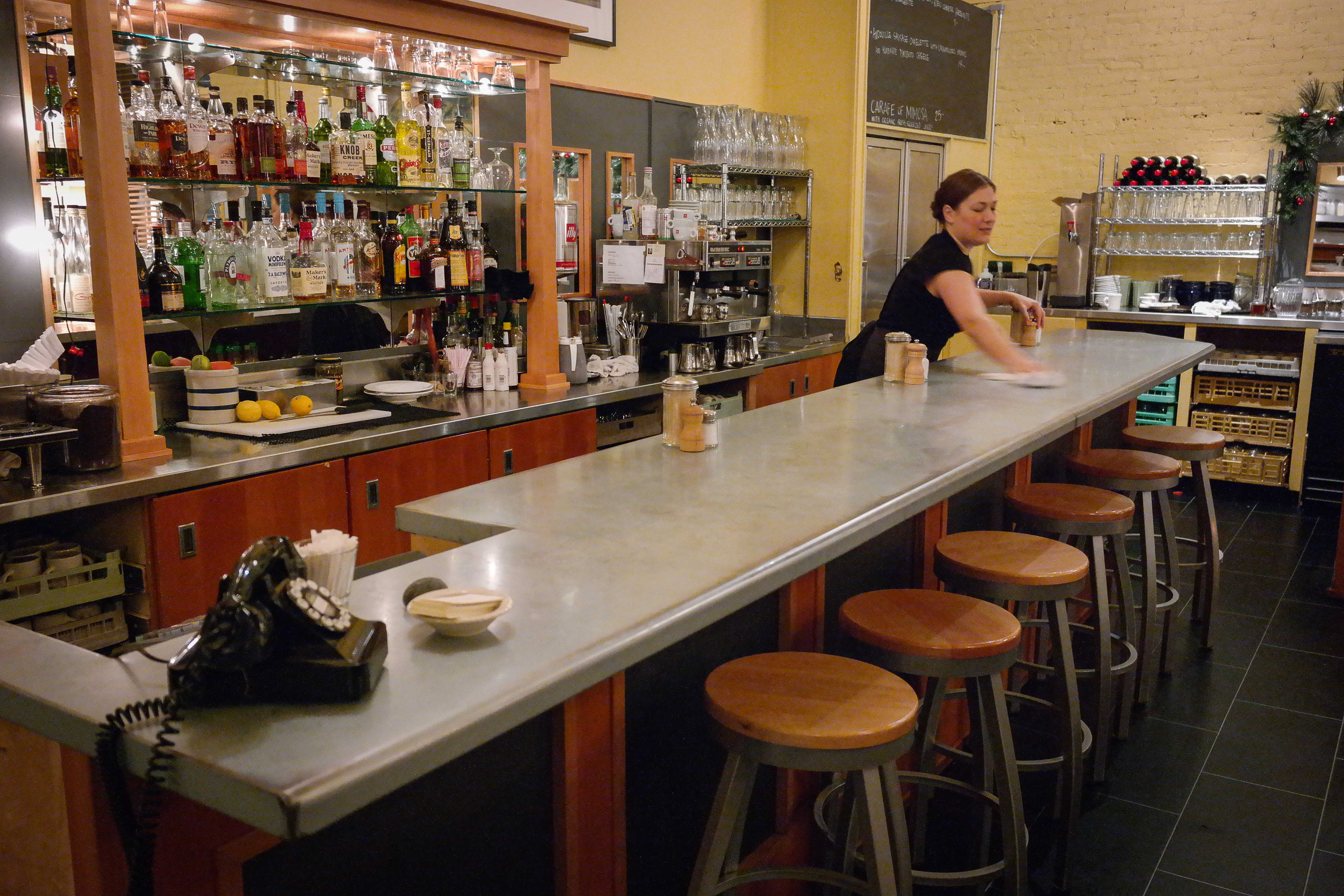
Bijou Cafe

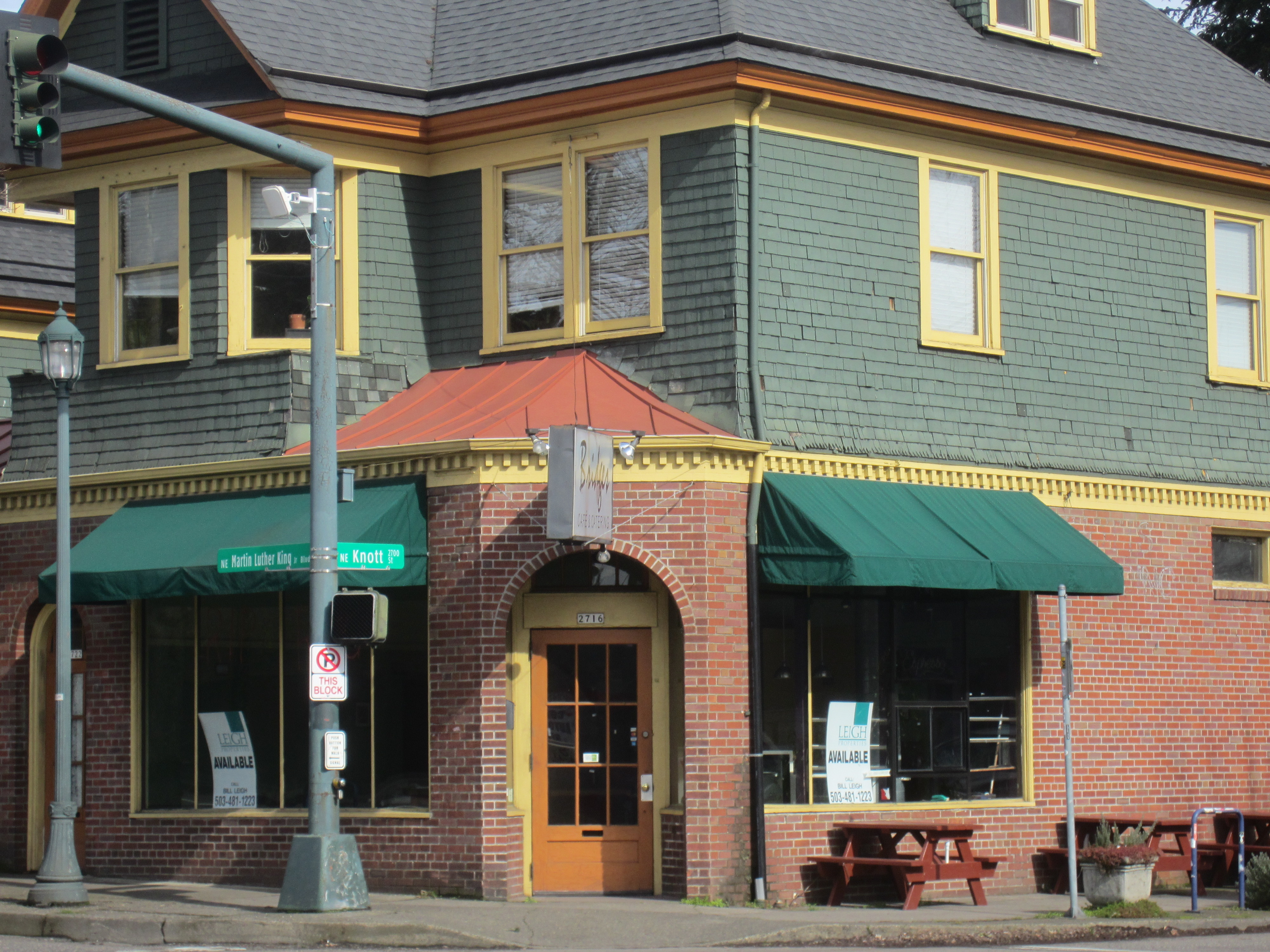
Bridges Cafe

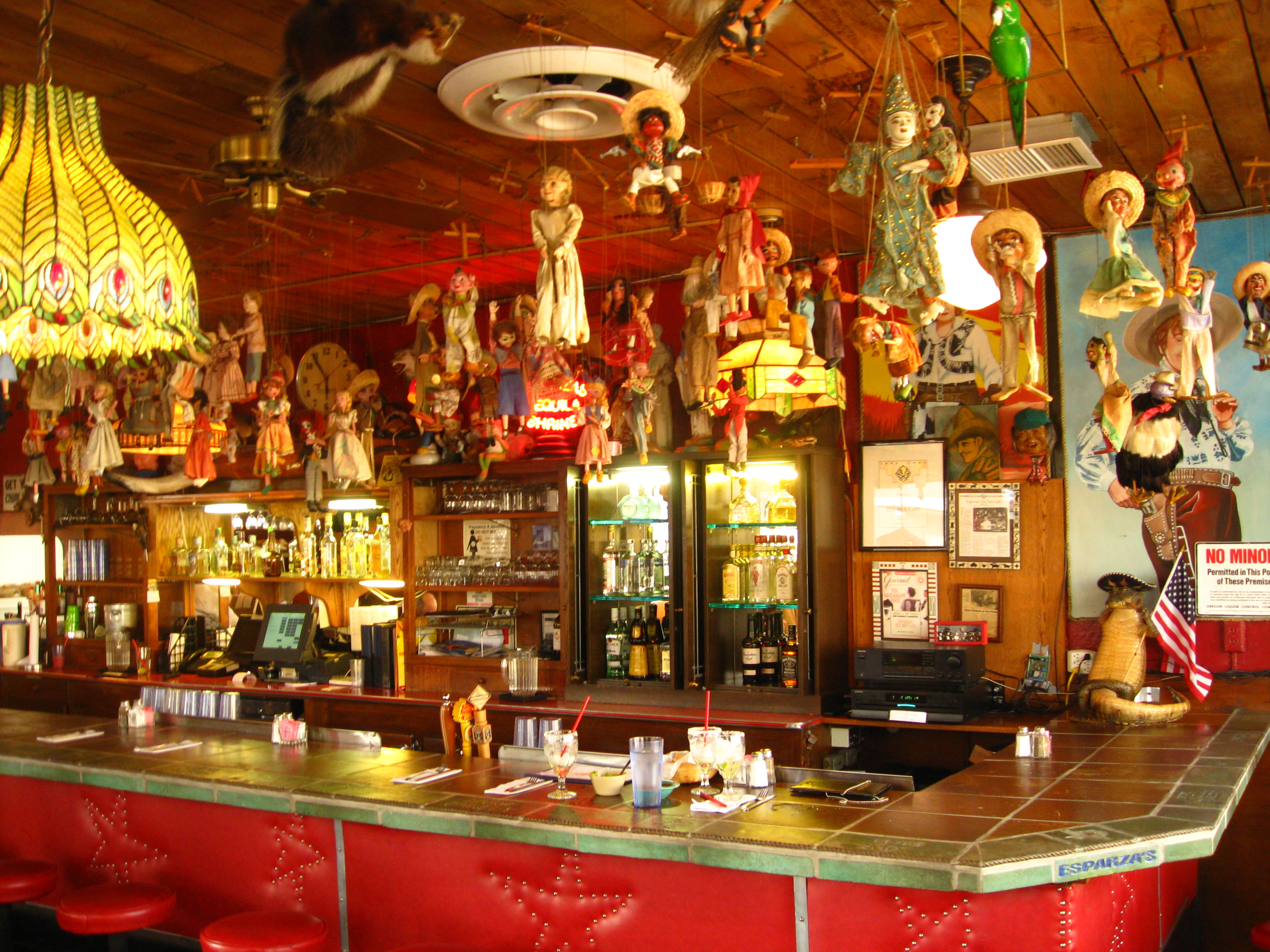
Esparza's, 2008

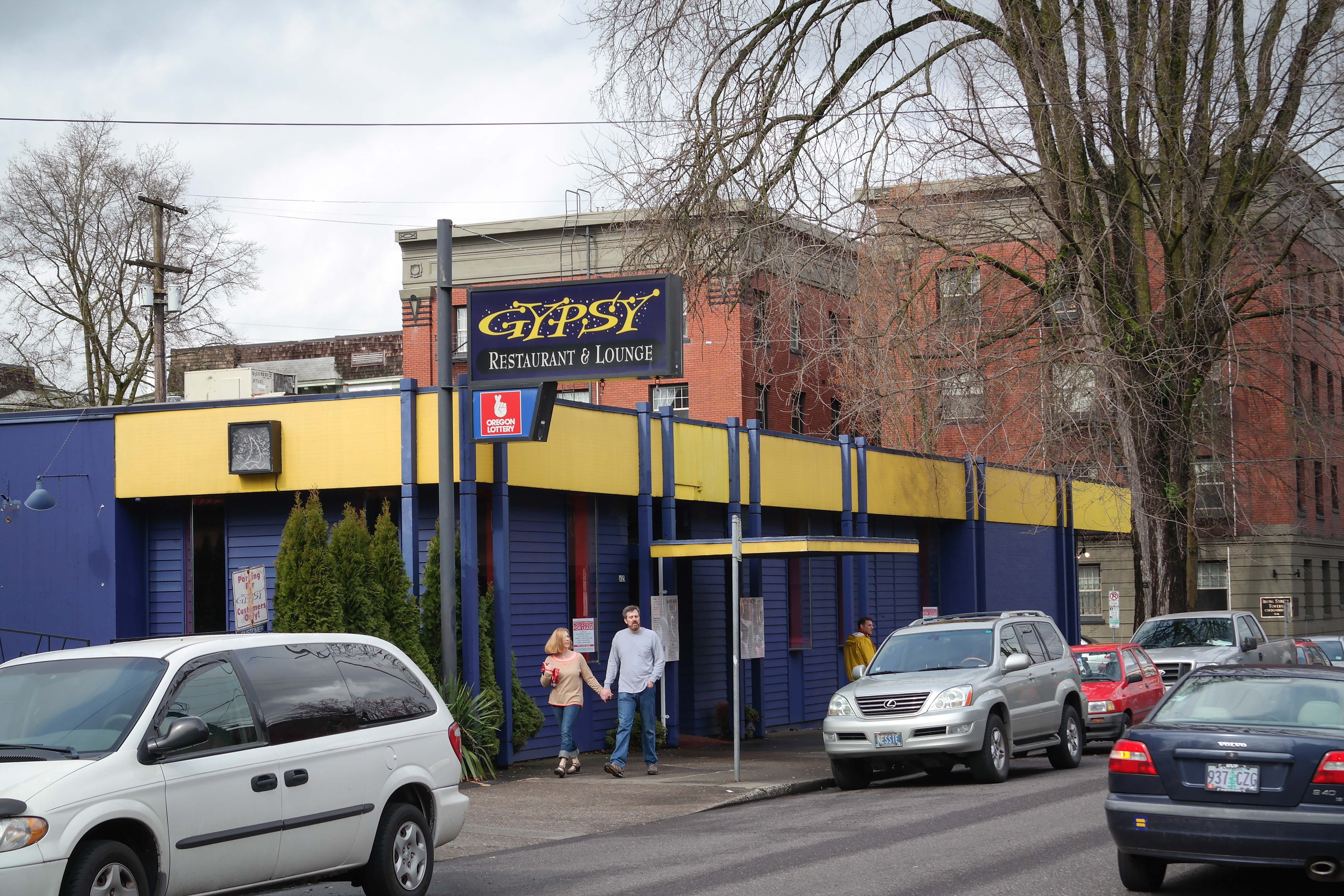
Gypsy Restaurant and Velvet Lounge

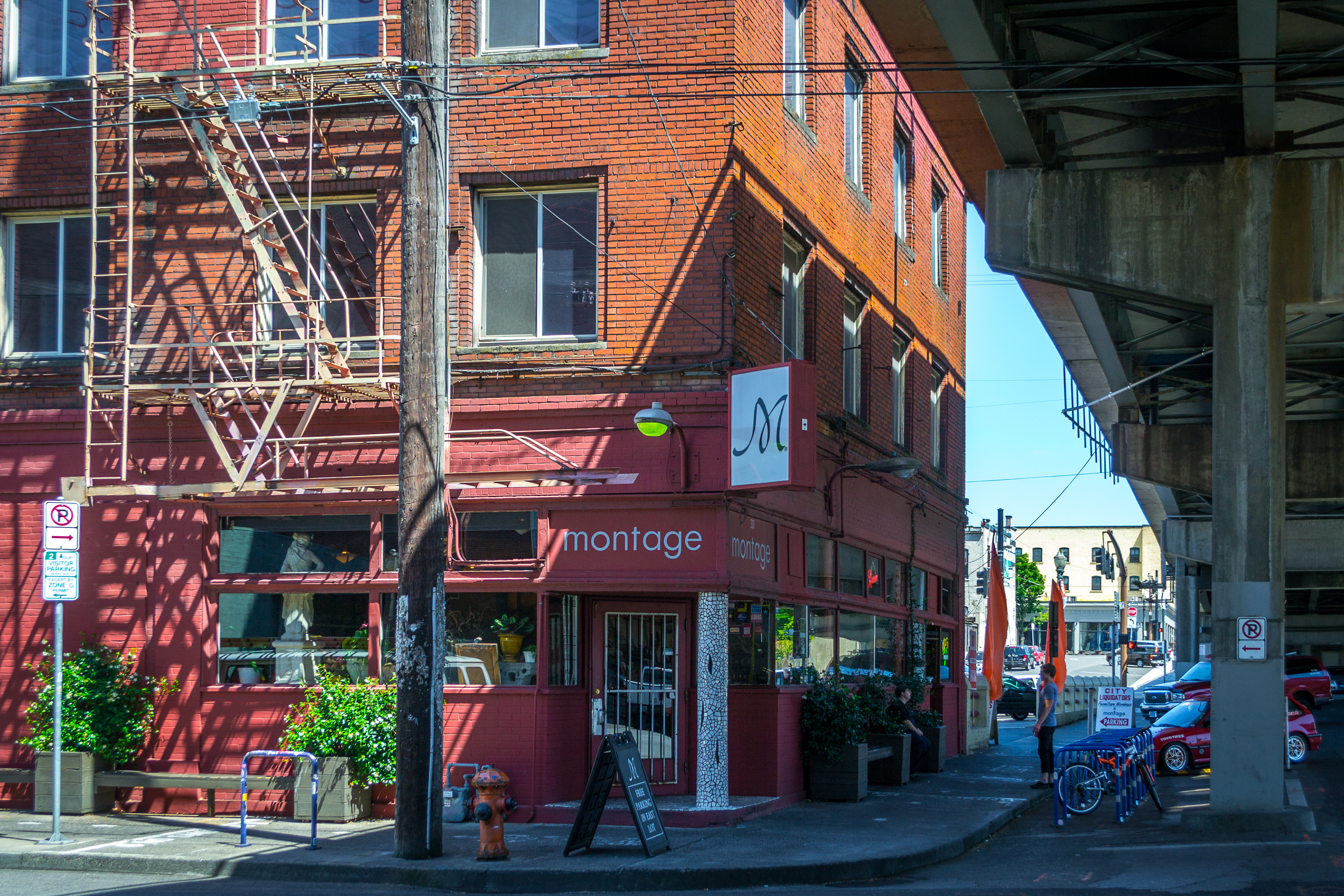
Le Bistro Montage, 2013

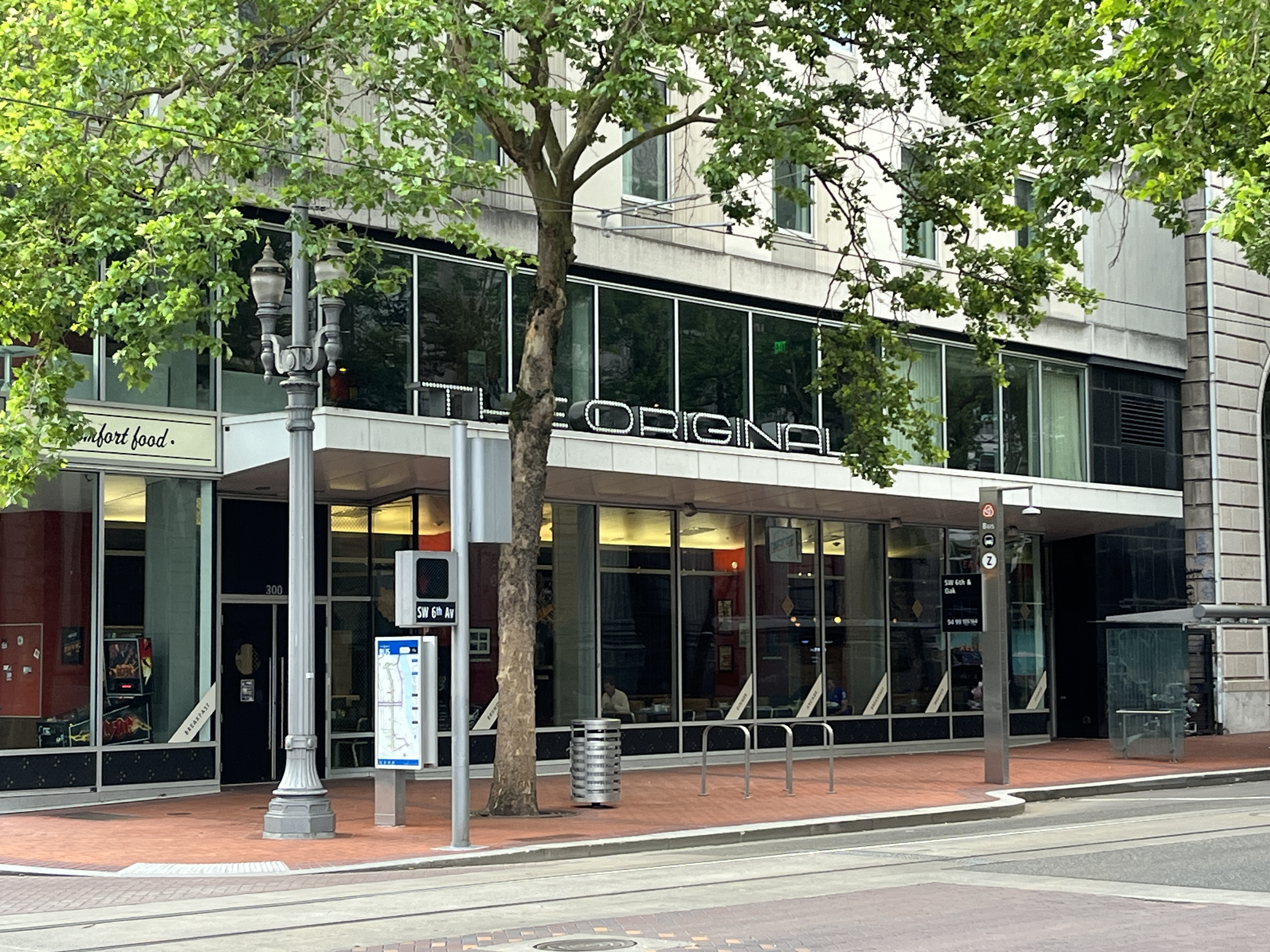
The Original Dinerant

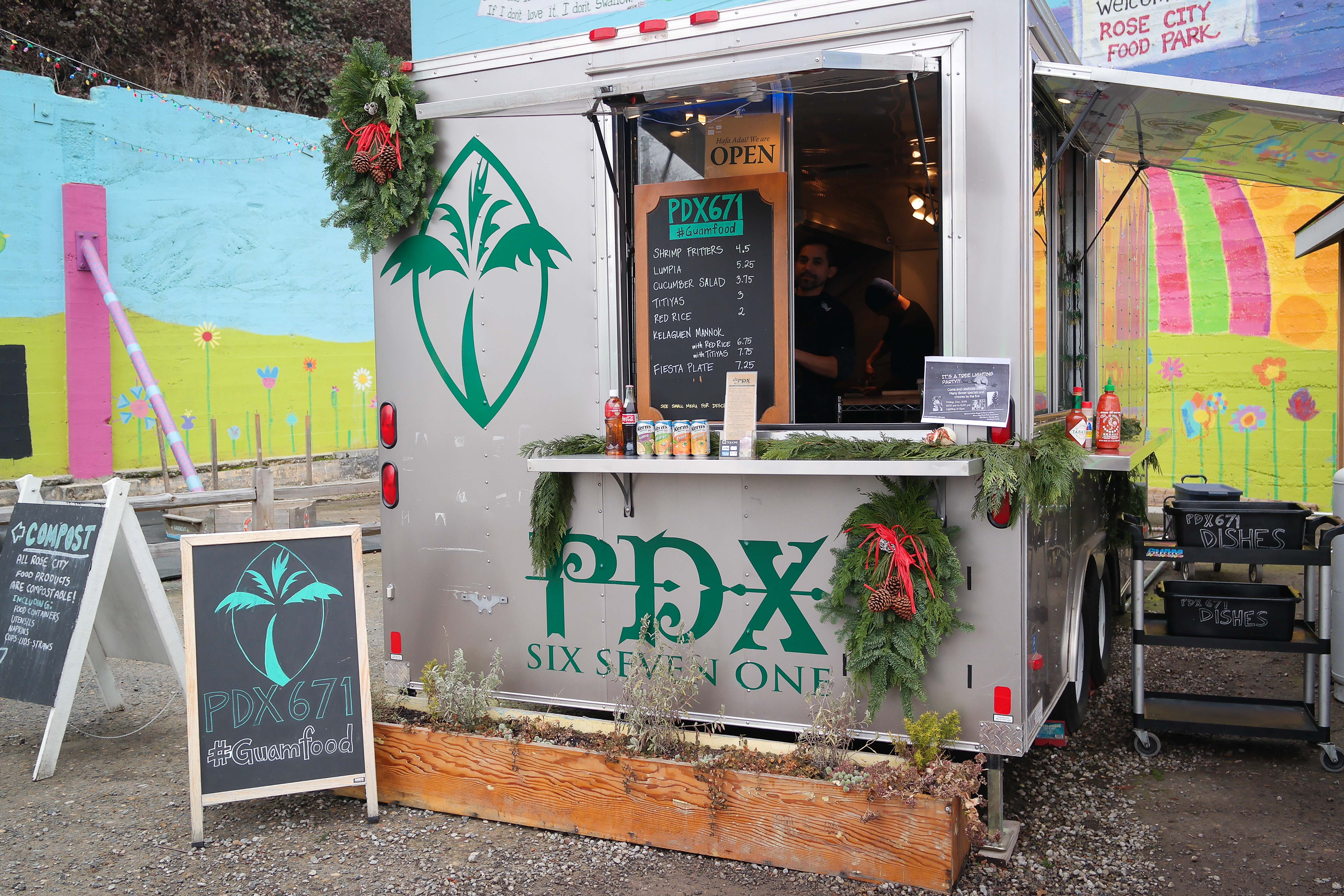
PDX671

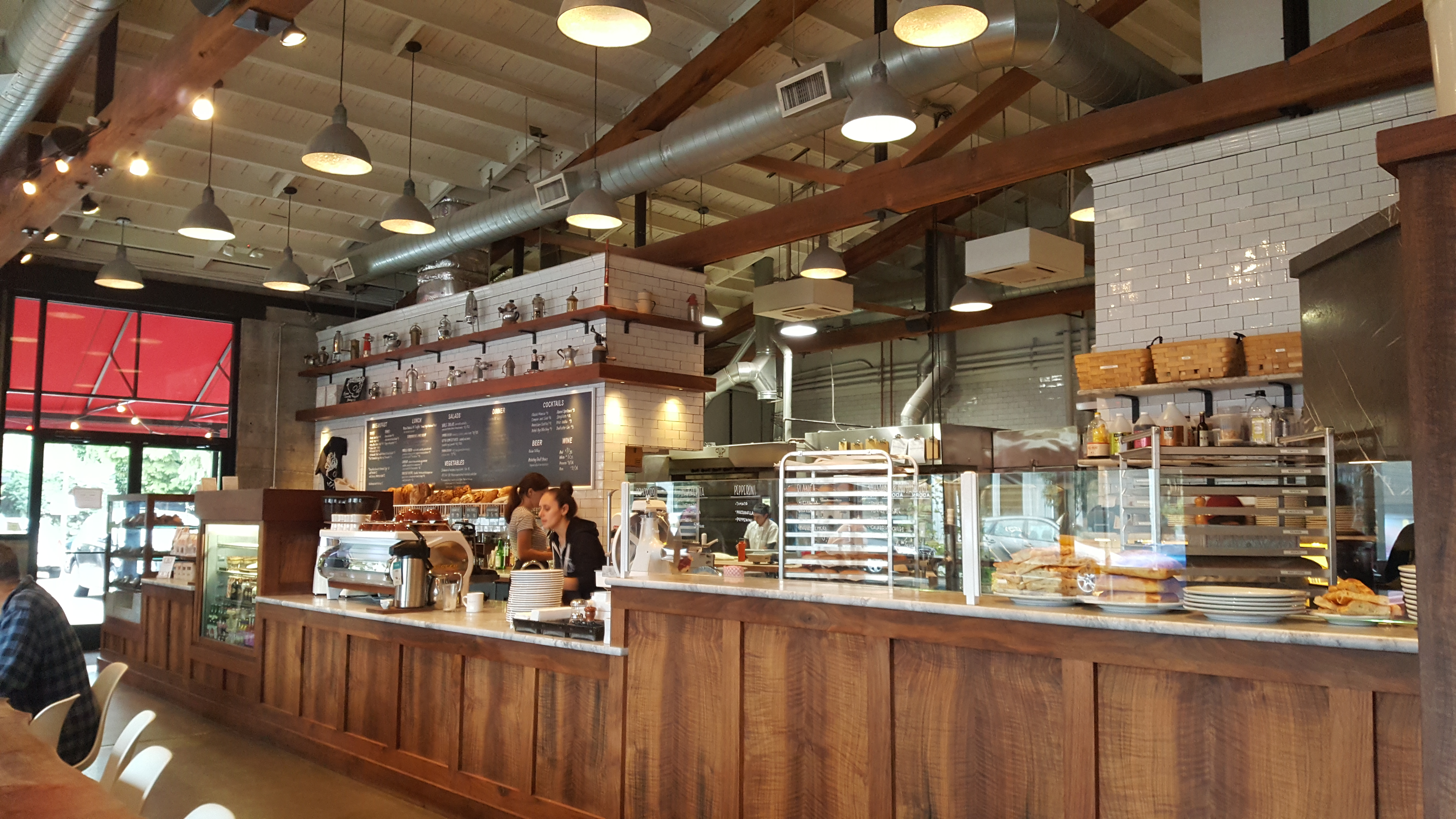
Roman Candle (2016)

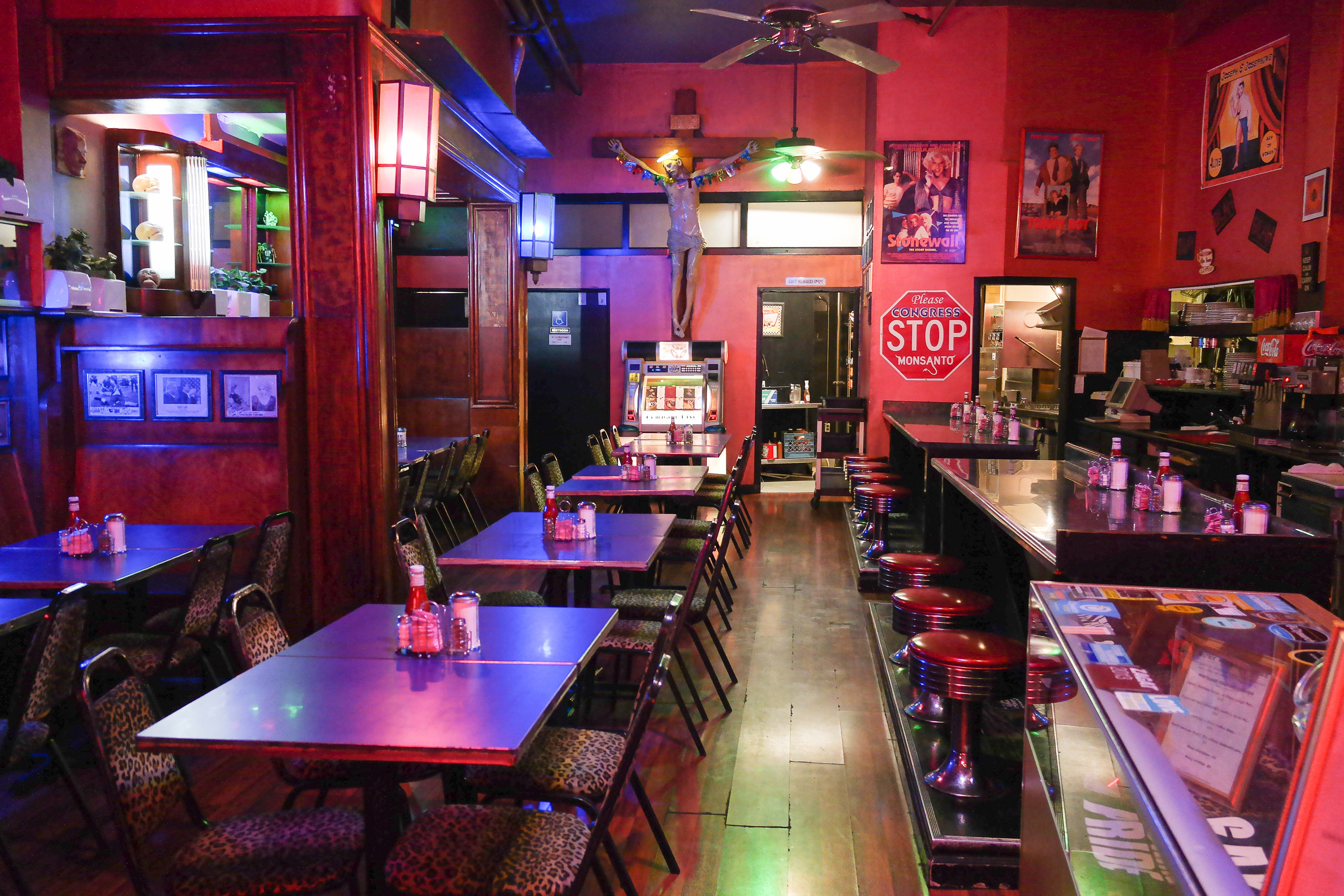
The Roxy

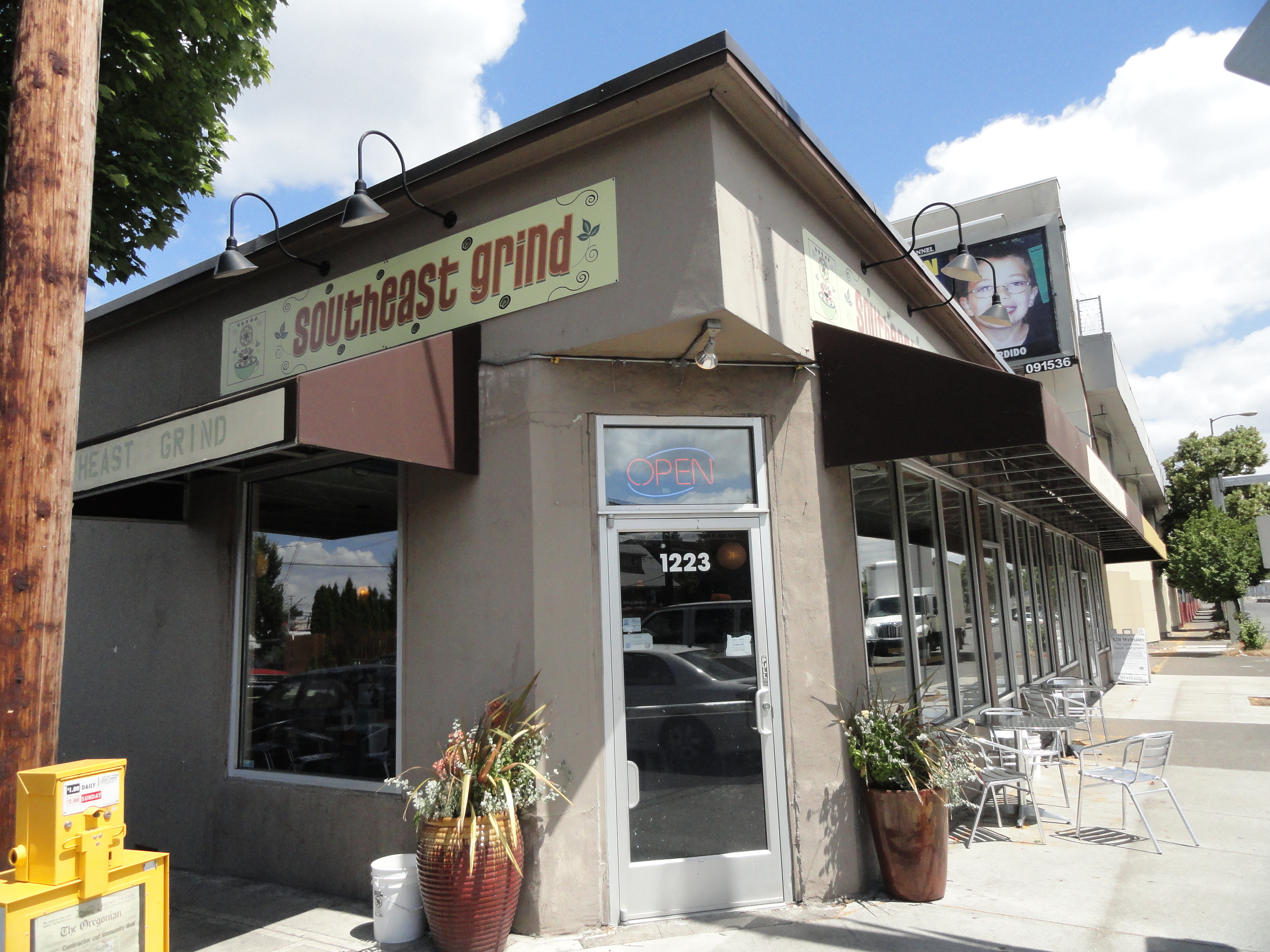
Southeast Grind

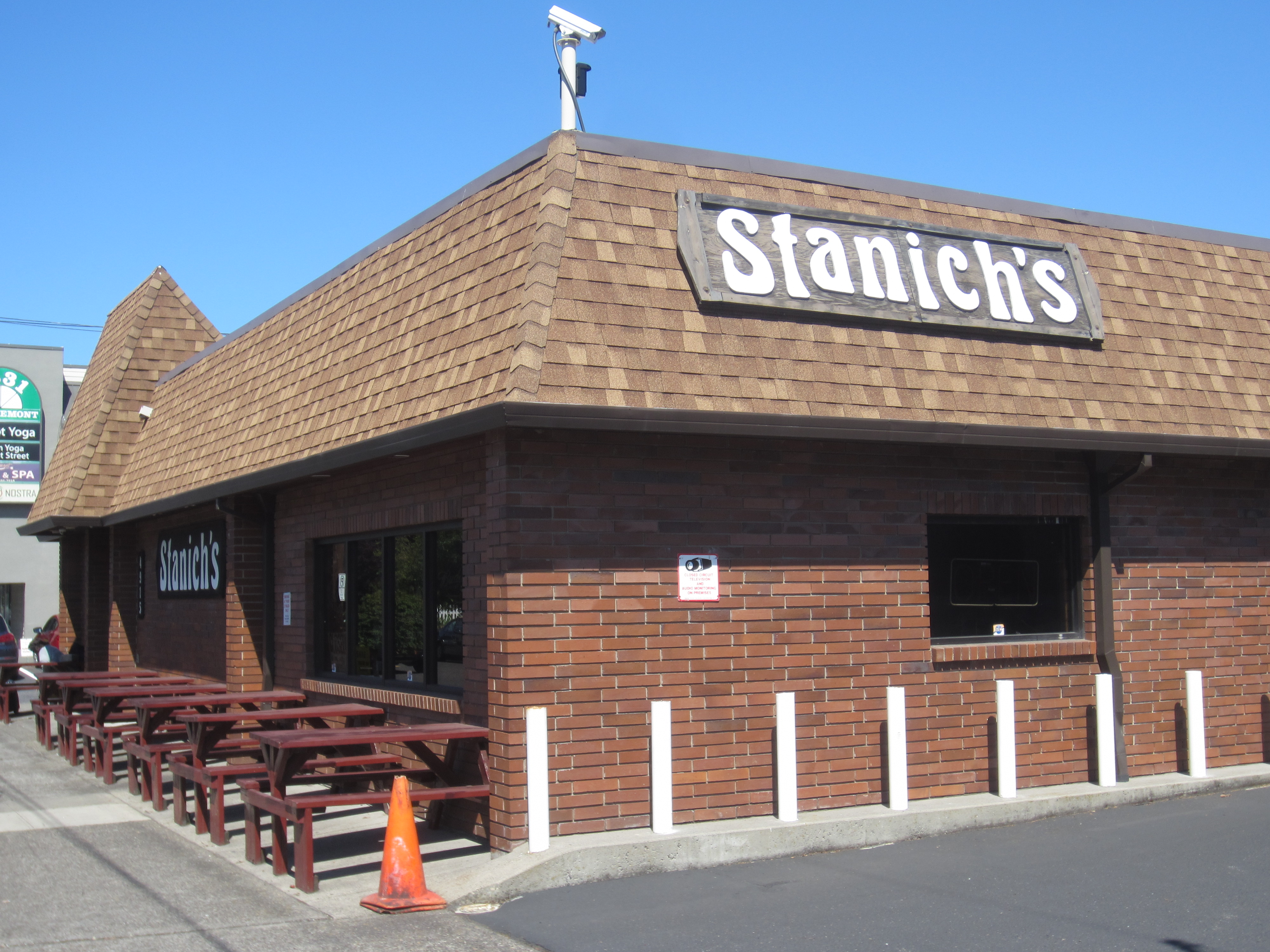
Stanich's

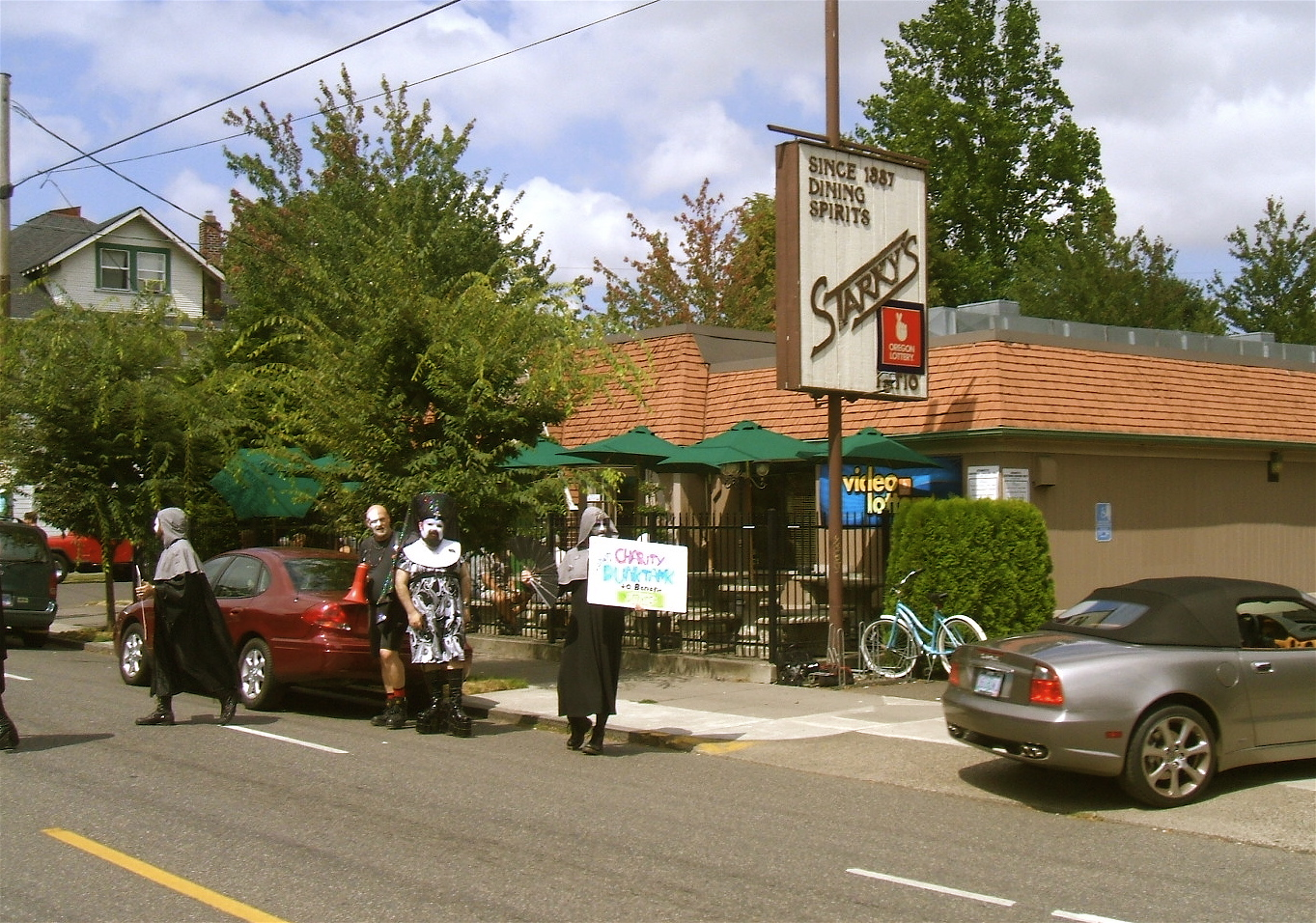
Starky's

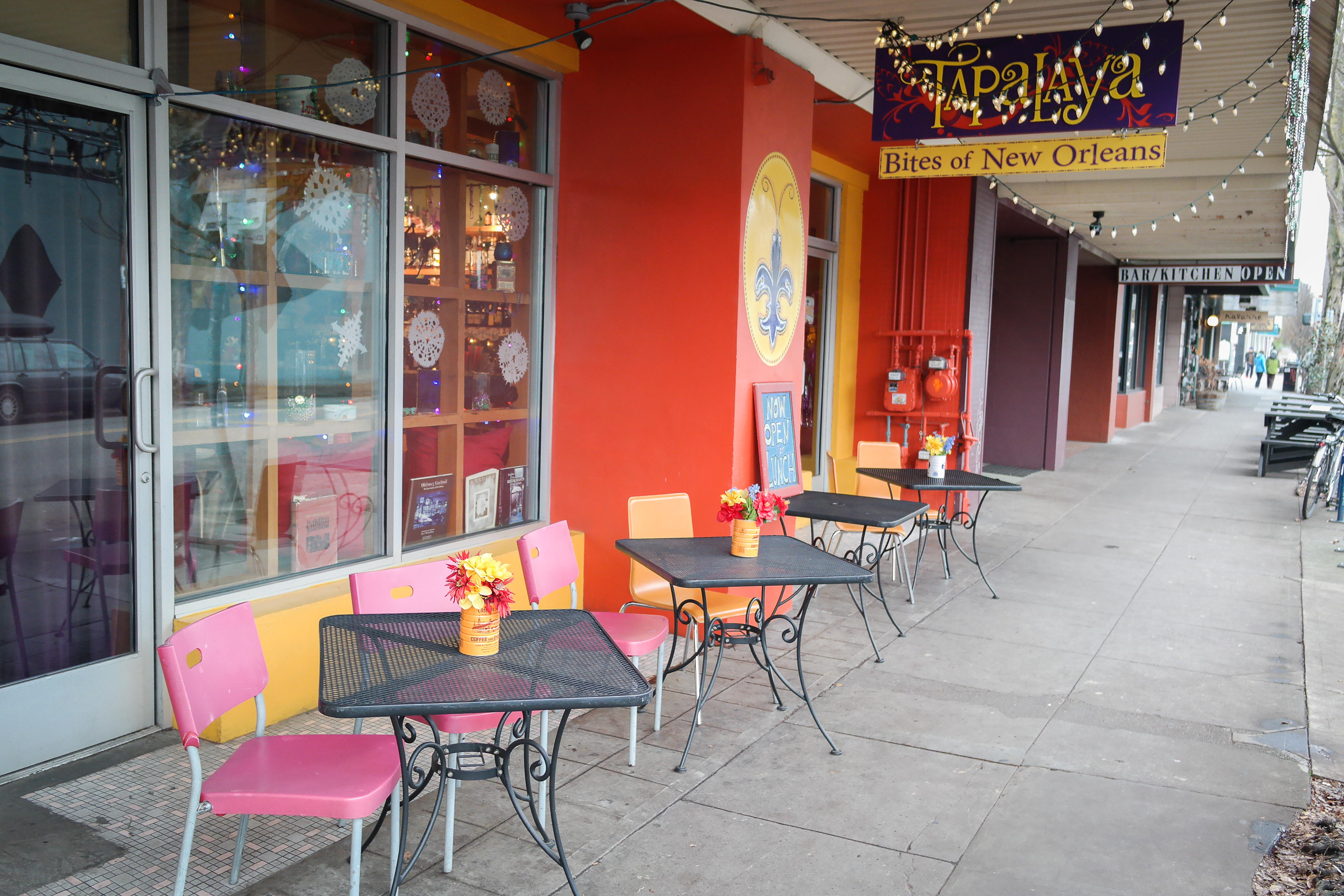
Tapalaya, 2013

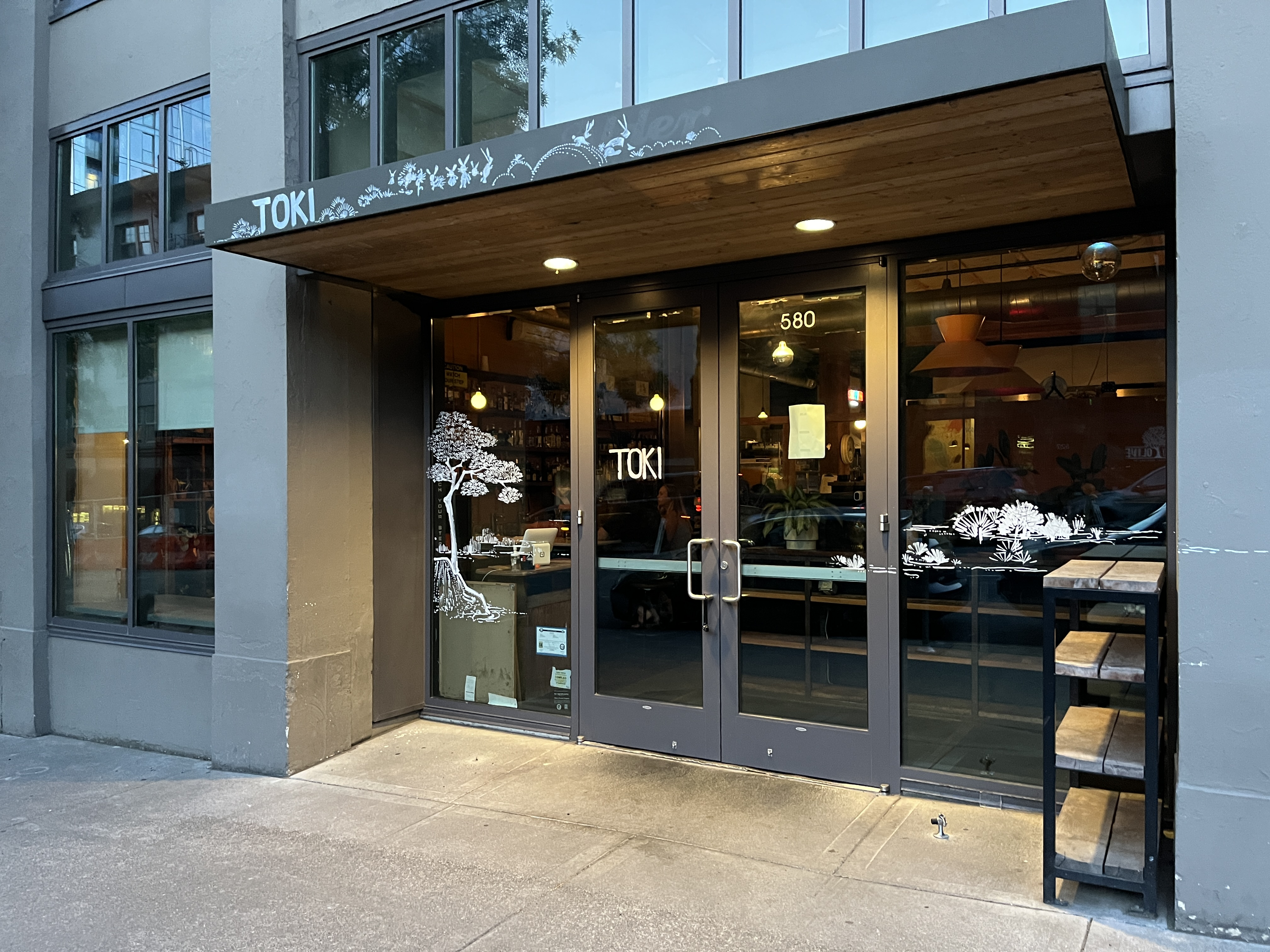
Toki

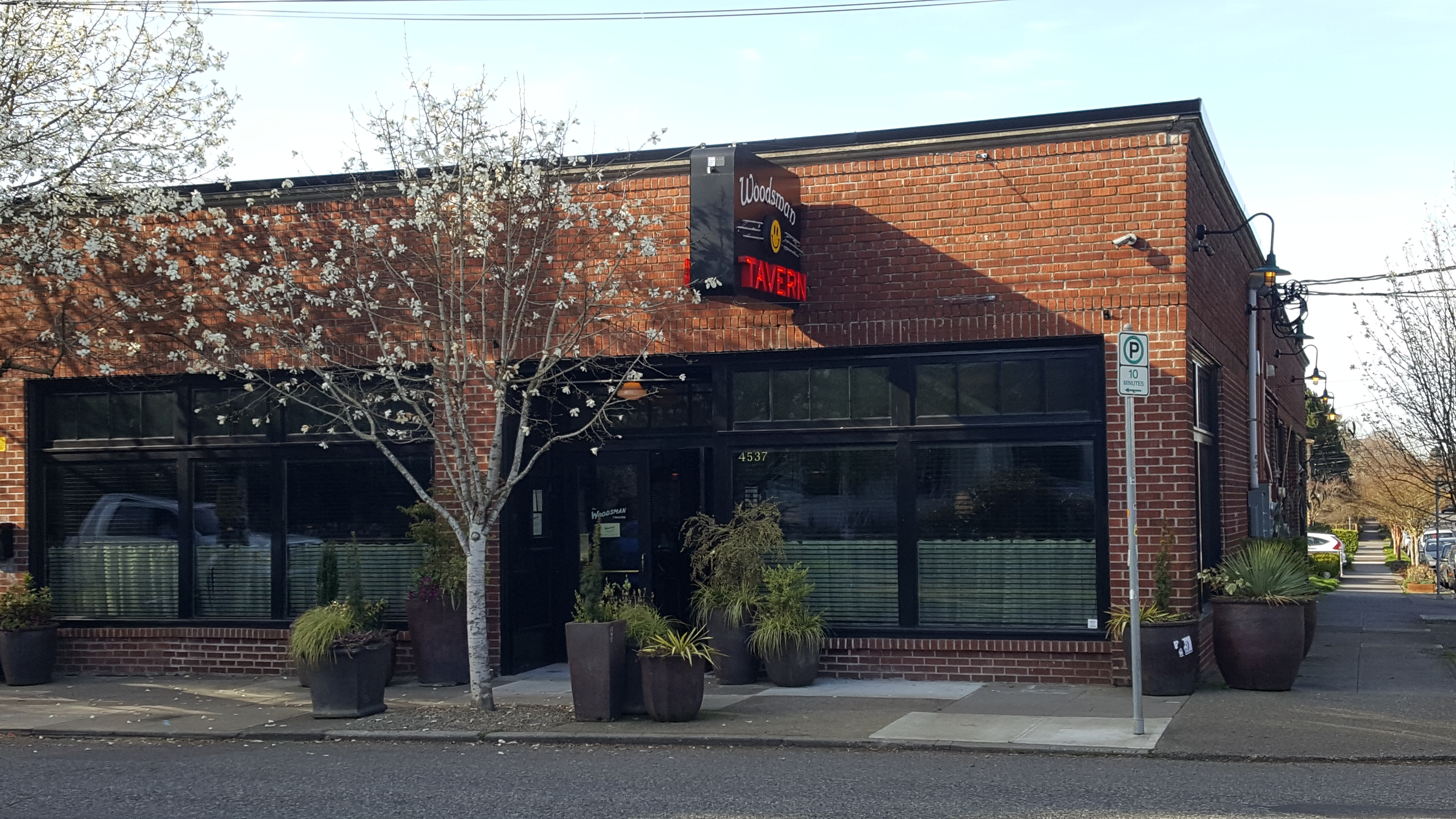
The Woodsman Tavern

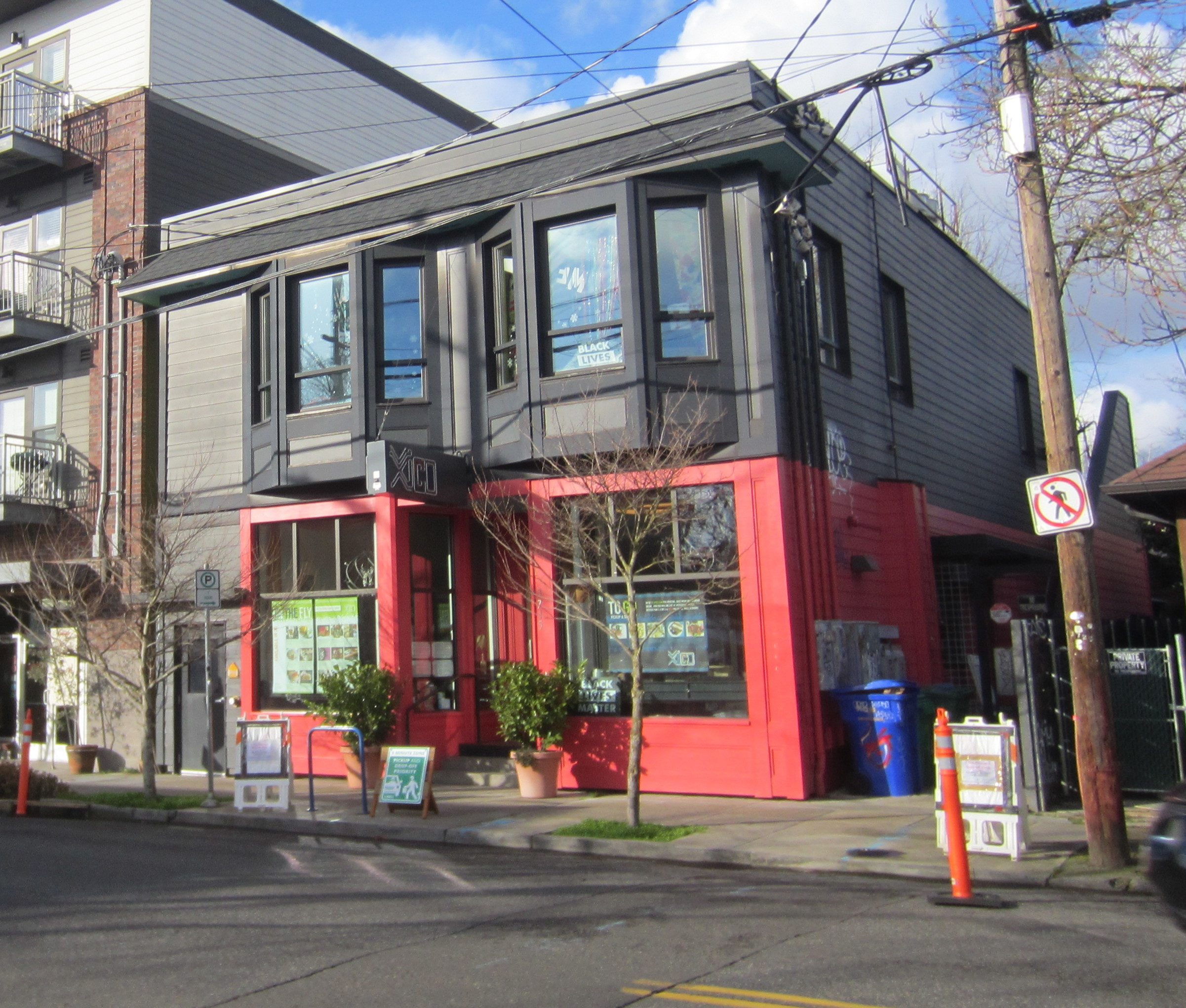
Xico

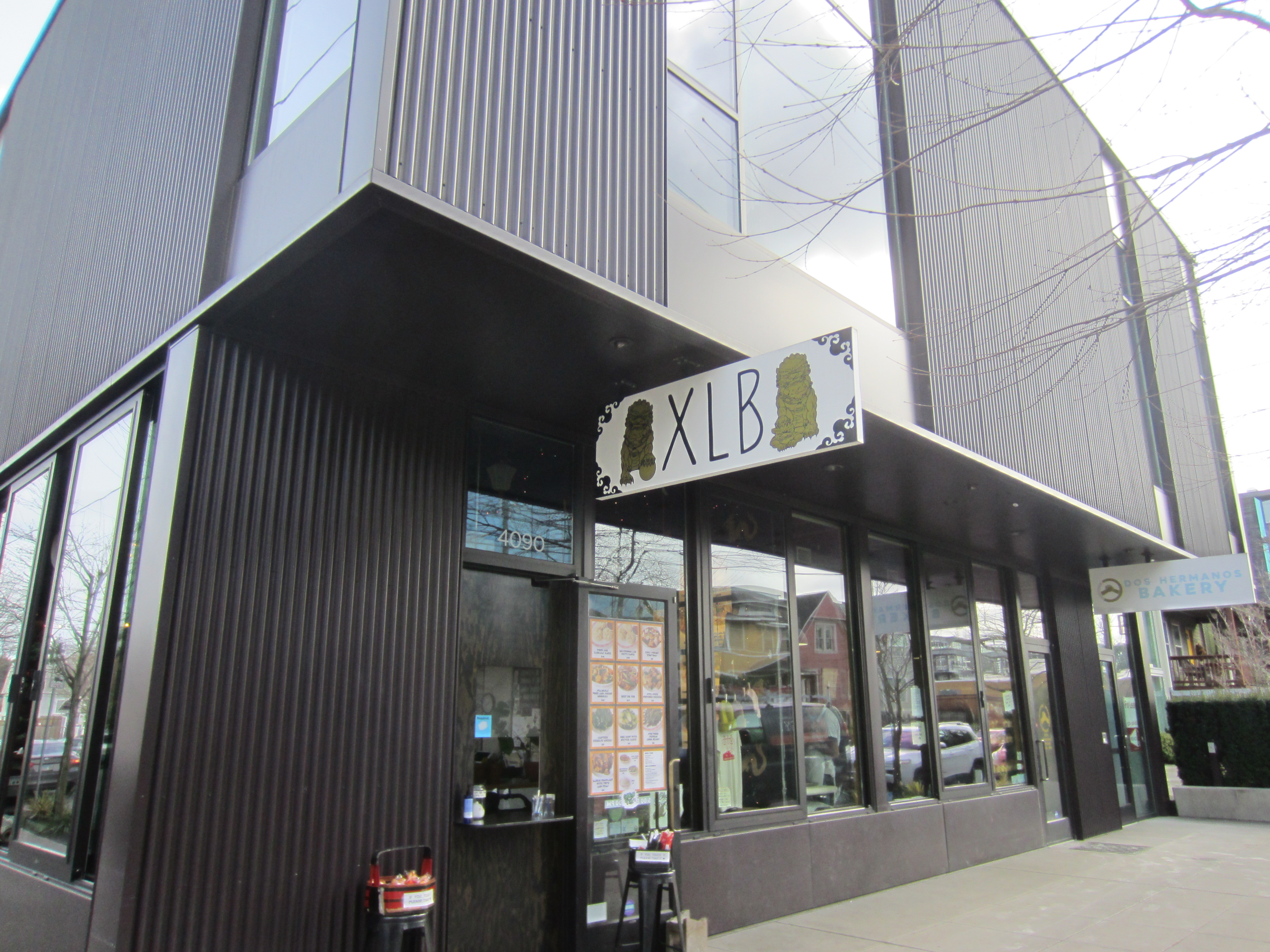
XLB

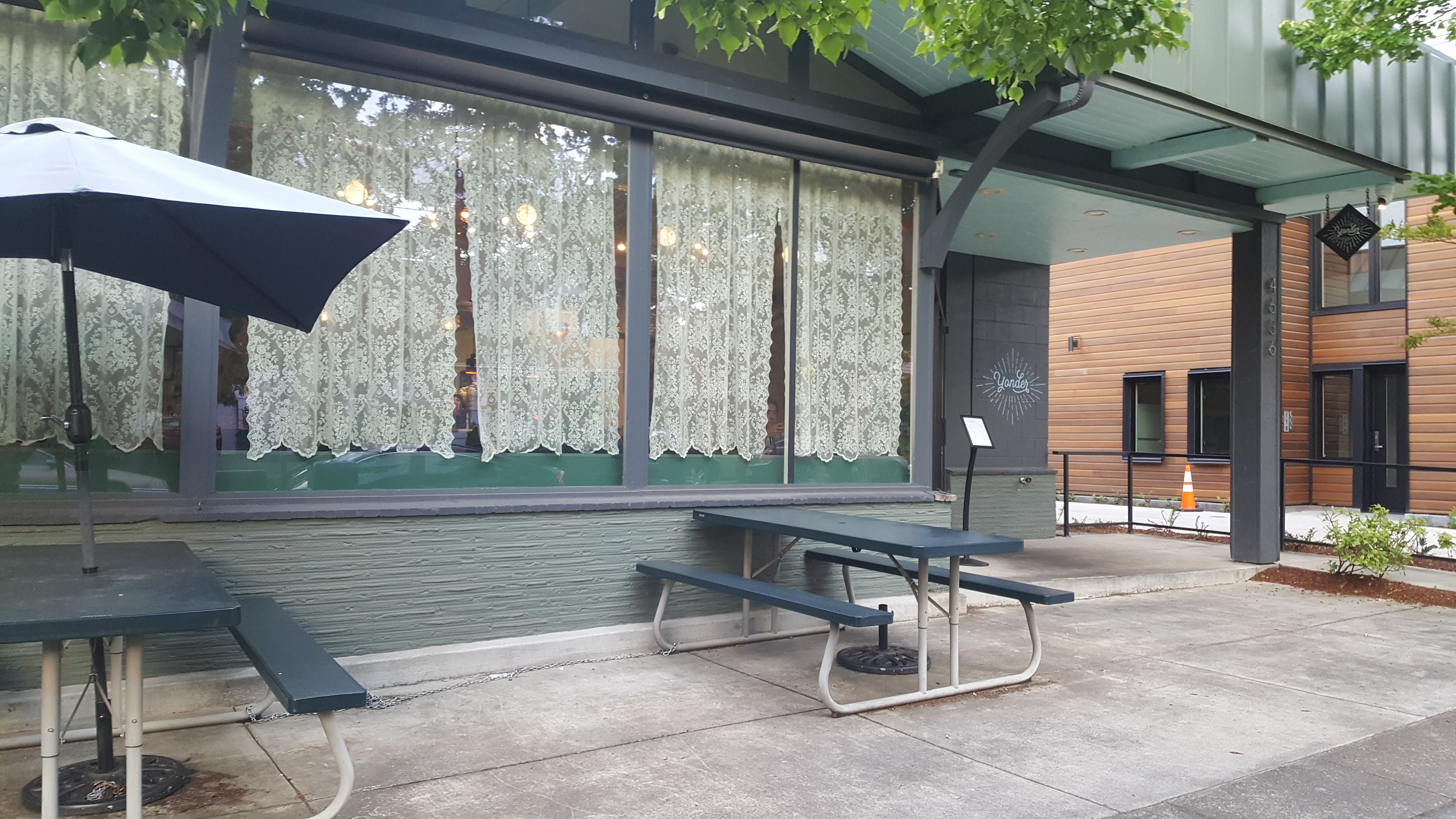
Yonder

Following is a list of notable defunct restaurants in Portland, Oregon:

- 180 Xurros
- 3 Doors Down Café and Lounge
- Abou Karim
- Acadia: A New Orleans Bistro
- Alexis Restaurant (1980–2016)
- Alpenrausch
- Altabira City Tavern (2015–2020)
- American Dream Pizza
- Analog Café and Theater
- Anna Bannanas Cafe (1994–2024)
- Arleta Library Bakery & Cafe (2005–2020)
- Assembly Brewing
- Ataula (2013–2021)
- Autentica
- Aviary (2011–2020)
- Aviv (2017–2021)
- Baby Blue Pizza (2019–2022)
- Back 2 Earth
- Backspace
- Bailey's Taproom (2007–2021)
- Baon Kainan
- Bar Casa Vale
- Bartini
- Batterfish
- Beaker & Flask
- Beast (2007–2020)
- Beastro
- Berbati's Pan
- Berlin Inn (1992–2013)
- Bijou Cafe
- Bistro Agnes (2018–2022)
- Bit House Saloon (2015–2021)
- Biwa (2007–2018)
- Bluehour (2000–2020)
- Blueplate Lunch Counter and Soda Fountain (2006–2016)
- Bombay Cricket Club
- Botanical Bakeshop
- Botanist House (2018–2021)
- Brasserie Montmartre (1978–2006; 2009–2011; 2012–2015)
- Bridge City Pizza
- Bridges Cafe (late 1990s – 2020)
- British Overseas Restaurant Corporation, formerly Saffron Colonial (2016–2019)
- Burger Stevens (2016–2024)
- Byways Cafe (1999–2019)
- Câche Câche
- Cafe Azul
- Caffe Mingo
- Candlelight Cafe & Bar (1984–2012)
- Canlis
- Canton Grill
- Carriage Room
- Castagna
- Century Bar (2016)
- Chelo
- Chez Machin (later Frog & Snail)
- Chinese Village
- Cicoria
- Circa 33 (2010–2021)
- Clyde Common (2007–2022)
- Country Bill's (1964–2012)
- Crush Bar (2001–2024)
- Cultured Caveman
- Cup & Saucer Cafe (1980s–2022)
- Cupcake Jones
- Davis Street Tavern (2008–2016)
- De Noche (2022–2025)
- Deadshot
- Der Rheinlander (1963–2017)
- Dick's Kitchen (2010)
- Dig a Pony (2011–2022)
- Dime Store (2014–2015)
- Doc Marie's
- Dóttir (2019–2022)
- EastBurn
- Egyptian Club
- El Gallo Taqueria (2009–2022)
- Esparza's (1990–2014)
- Everybody Eats PDX
- Evoe
- Expatriate
- Fair Weather
- Fat Head's Brewery
- Favela Brazilian Cafe
- Fenouil (2005–2011)
- Fermenter (2019–2024)
- Fish Grotto
- Fong Chong
- Genoa
- Georgian Room
- Gilt Club (2005–2014)
- Gladstone Street Pizza
- The Goose
- Gotham Tavern
- Gracie's Apizza (2018–2026)
- Greek Cusina
- Grüner (2009–2015)
- Gypsy Restaurant and Velvet Lounge (1947–2014)
- Handsome Pizza (2012–2022)
- Henry Ford's Restaurant
- Henry Thiele Restaurant (1932–1990s)
- Hobo's
- Holler
- Holy Trinity Barbecue (2019–2021)
- House of Louie
- Houston Blacklight
- Hunan Restaurant (1979–2014)
- Hung Far Low (1928–2015)
- HunnyMilk
- Industrial Cafe and Saloon
- Interurban
- Irving Street Kitchen (2010–2020)
- Isabel Pearl
- JaCiva's Bakery and Chocolatier (1986–2024)
- Jackknife Bar (2014–2020)
- Jazz de Opus (1972–2003)
- Kenny & Zuke's Delicatessen
- Kornblatt's Delicatessen (1991–2023)
- La Calaca Comelona
- La Carreta Mexican Restaurant (1990–2020s)
- La Moule
- Lazy Susan (2020–2023)
- Le Bistro Montage
- Le Happy
- Leaky Roof Gastropub
- Legin
- Lincoln Restaurant (2008–2017)
- The Liquor Store (2015–2020)
- Little Bird Bistro (2010–2019)
- Local Lounge (2010–2021)
- Lollipop Shoppe
- Lonesome's Pizza (2010–2017)
- Lovely Hula Hands (2003–2009)
- Lucier (2008)
- Malka (2020–2023)
- Mama Bird
- Mama Đút (2020–2023)
- Marukin Ramen
- Masala Lab PDX
- Masia
- The Matador (1971–2014)
- Meals 4 Heels
- Metrovino
- Mi Mero Mole (2011–2020)
- Misfits Bar and Lounge (2022–2025)
- Miss Delta
- Monte Carlo
- Natural Selection
- Ned Ludd
- Nel Centro (2009–2020)
- New Cathay
- New Copper Penny
- No Vacancy Lounge
- NOLA Doughnuts
- Ocean City Seafood Restaurant (2009–2020s)
- Olympia Provisions Public House
- Organ Grinder Restaurant
- The Original Dinerant
- Original Taco House (1960–2017)
- Oui Presse
- Overlook Restaurant (1974–2018)
- The Pagoda (1940–2008)
- Paley's Place (1995–2021)
- Paradox Cafe
- Paragon
- The Parish (2012–2016)
- Pastificio d'Oro
- Pasture PDX
- Pazzo Ristorante
- PDX671
- Pearl Tavern (2016–2018)
- Phở Gabo
- Pied Cow Coffeehouse
- Ping (2009–2012; 2020–2021)
- Pink Feather (1957–2017)
- Pink Rabbit
- Pok Pok (2005–2020)
- Portland Penny Diner (2012–2017)
- Portobello Vegan Trattoria (2008–2016)
- Public Domain Coffee
- Purrington's Cat Lounge
- Quaintrelle
- The Queen's Head (2021–2022)
- Ración
- Radar (2012–2022)
- Rams Head Pub
- Raven & Rose
- Red and Black Cafe (2000–2015)
- Reeva
- Revelry (2016–2020)
- The Richmond Bar
- RingSide Fish House (2011–2018)
- Ripe Cooperative
- Robo Taco
- Roman Candle (2013–2018)
- Roost
- The Roxy (1994–2022)
- Santa Fe Taqueria (1990–2024)
- Santé Bar
- Satyricon
- Saucebox (1995–2020)
- Seastar Bakery
- Sen Yai
- Shift Drinks (2015–2020)
- Shine Distillery and Grill (2019–2023)
- Shizuku by Chef Naoko
- Shoofly Vegan Bakery
- Shut Up and Eat
- Sissy Bar (2022–2024)
- Slide Inn
- Southeast Grind (2009–2019)
- Stacked Sandwich Shop (2017–2021; 2023)
- Stanich's
- Starky's (1984–2015)
- The Sudra
- Sunshine Noodles (2019–2022)
- Sunshine Tavern (2011–2017)
- SuperBite
- Sweet Hereafter (2011–2024)
- Sweet Lorraine's (2021–2024)
- Tails & Trotters
- Tanuki
- Tapalaya (2008–2019)
- Tasty n Alder (2013–2020)
- Tasty n Daughters (2019–2020)
- Tasty n Sons (–2019)
- Teote
- Tercet
- There Be Monsters
- Three Sisters Tavern (1964–2004)
- Tilt (2012)
- Toki
- Toro Bravo (2007–2020)
- Touché Restaurant & Bar (1995–2017)
- The Uncanny
- Unicorn Bake Shop
- Vault Cocktail Lounge
- Veritable Quandary (1971–2016)
- Via Tribunali
- Victory Bar (c. 2006–2019)
- Whiskey Soda Lounge
- Wildwood (1994–2014)
- Wong's King (2004–2020)
- The Woodsman Tavern (2011–2018; 2021–2023)
- Xico (2012–2023)
- XLB
- Yaw's Top Notch
- Yonder (2019–2022)
- Zefiro (1990–2000)

== Restaurant chains ==
- Boxer Ramen (2013–2024)
- Shari's Cafe & Pies

== Food cart pods ==
Notable defunct food cart pods include:

- Alder Street food cart pod (1990s–2019)
- Carts on Foster (2010–2023)

== See also ==
- Culture of Portland, Oregon
- Dame Collective
- List of defunct restaurants of the United States
- Pacific Northwest cuisine
