= Rum Club =

Bar in Portland, Oregon, U.S.

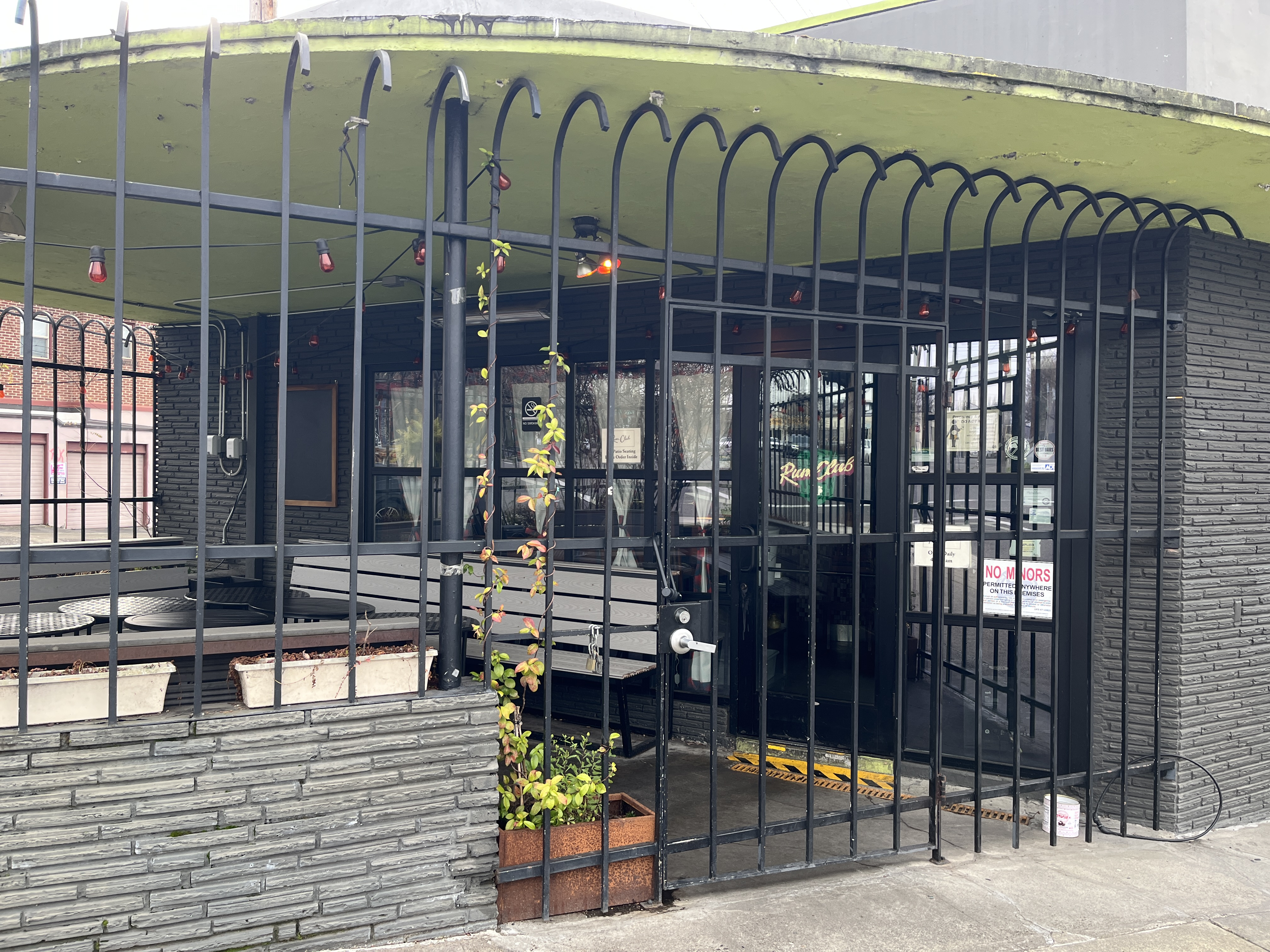
- The bar's exterior, 2026
- Interactive map of Rum Club

Restaurant information
- Established: July 2011
- Location: 720 Southeast Sandy Boulevard, Portland, Multnomah, Oregon, 97214, United States
- Coordinates: 45.5190°N 122.6579°W

Rum Club is a bar in Portland, Oregon, United States. It is owned by Kevin Ludwig and Mike Shea, who also co-owned nearby Beaker & Flask.

== Description ==
The bar Rum Club operates on Sandy Boulevard in Southeast Portland's Buckman neighborhood. The interior has a wooden horseshoe-shaped bar and wallpaper with a hummingbird print. Alexander Frane of Condé Nast Traveler described the food as "Southeast Asia with a touch of South America". Among drinks on the menu is the Celeste Swizzle, which has four kinds of Jamaican rum as well as absinthe. The signature Rum Club Daiquiri has Bacardi 8, lime, Demerara syrup, maraschino liqueur, absinthe, and bitters. The Quarterdeck Cocktail has Black Seal Rum, sherry, Scotch whisky, and orange bitters.

== History ==
The bar opened in July 2011.

== Reception ==
Rum Club was a runner-up in the Best Bar and Best Cocktail Lounge categories of Willamette Week's annual readers' poll in 2015. In Condé Nast Traveler's 2018 list of Portland's thirteen best bars, Alexander Frane called the menu "a bit scattered, but it all goes remarkably well with what you're drinking". In 2019, 1859 Oregon's Magazine called Rum Club "crowded, loud and a little wild", as well as "a haven for cocktail enthusiasts" with an ambience that "presents a delicious cacophony of sounds and styles". Alex Frane included the business in Portland Monthly's 2025 list of the city's best bars.
