= Stanich's =

Defunct restaurant in Portland, Oregon, U.S.

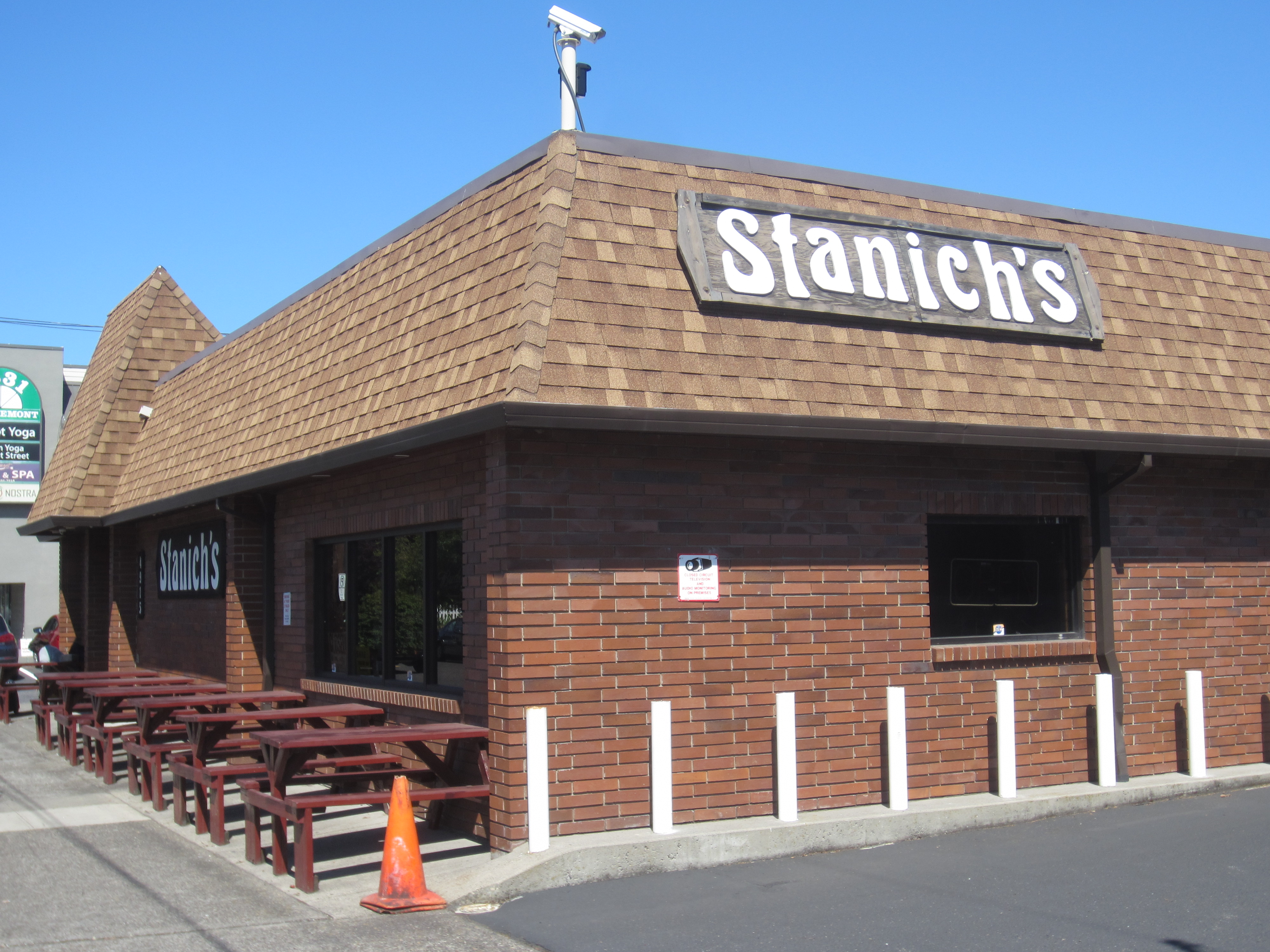
- The restaurant's exterior, 2019
- Interactive map of Stanich's

Restaurant information
- Established: 1949
- Location: 4915 Northeast Fremont Street, Portland, Multnomah, Oregon, 97213, United States
- Coordinates: 45.5483°N 122.6124°W

Stanich's was a restaurant in Portland, Oregon's Cully neighborhood, established in 1949.

== History ==
The restaurant was founded by Gladys and George Stanich in 1949. Their son, Steve Stanich, became the current owner.

In 2017, the restaurant's cheeseburger with grilled onions received the "best burger in America" award from Thrillist. Stanich's closed temporarily in January 2018, and as of August, planned to reopen. The restaurant's future was unclear, as of November 2018. Local media outlets suggested Stanich's would re-open in January or February 2019. Stanich's reopened in March 2019, but had closed again by March 2020. Stanich's is permanently closed due to owner Steven Stanich's illegal activity, including strangling his wife and reckless driving.

Stanich's was replaced by The Mule in February 2024.

== See also ==
- List of hamburger restaurants
