= There Be Monsters =

Defunct bar and restaurant in Portland, Oregon, U.S.

- Interactive map of There Be Monsters

Restaurant information
- Established: July 2014
- Closed: 2024
- Food type: British
- Location: 1308 Southeast Morrison Street, Portland, Multnomah, Oregon, 97214, United States
- Coordinates: 45.5171°N 122.6524°W
- Website: tbmpdx.com

There Be Monsters was a British-themed bar and restaurant in Portland, Oregon, United States. Operating in southeast Portland's Buckman neighborhood from 2014 to 2024, the bar served British cuisine and had games such as shuffleboard.

== Description ==
Ben Waterhouse of The Oregonian described There Be Monsters as a "laid-back, loosely British-themed bar" on Morrison Street in southeast Portland's Buckman neighborhood. Waterhouse wrote, "The bar is a cool, dim space, decorated with maps, tapestries, antique knicknacks and an oversized mustache outlined in lightbulbs. The music is chill, the seating is comfortable, and the enormous shuffleboard -- a holdover from previous tenants Havana West and Hal's -- offers plenty of entertainment." There Be Monsters had distressed walls, shuffleboard, sidewalk seating, and a covered patio.

The menu included sausage rolls, steak-and-Stilton pasties, and ale-battered fish and chips, chicken tikka masala, salmagundi, curried cauliflower, and yogurt raita. The happy hour menu included the Hal's Happy Beef Burger. The drink menu included beer and cocktails. The signature drink was the Hemingway daiquiri, which was made with Maraschino.

== History ==
The bar opened in July 2014, in the space that previously housed Hal's Tavern. There Be Monsters closed on May 4, 2024. An announcement on social media said, "Almost ten years ago we opened the doors to There Be Monsters —we really had no idea how it would go. It turns out that for the longest time it went great. We had (and still have) the best damn crew, a great product, and the best customers any establishment could ever ask for. We had it all and It felt great to be a part of the community we served. But, all parties must eventually come to an end and so, with sadness, we must announce that There Be Monsters is closing forever."

== Reception ==
The Oregonian included There Be Monsters in a 2014 list of Portland's ten best bars for games. Waterhouse wrote, "Both of Hal's successors chose to keep the old joint's shuffleboard table, and thank goodness for that: this beauty dates to the late 1940s, and though it's been stripped of its electric scoreboard -- a concession to aesthetics -- it's still given pride of place, with gorgeous spot lighting. There Be Monsters is likely your best bet for an informal tournament. If you get tired of playing, grab a cocktail and head for the covered patio out back." He also described the clientele as "a Gen X-er in a snap front plaid shirt with the outline of Oregon tatooed on his forearm".

In 2017, Willamette Week said, "The former Hal's Tavern has better beer now, and better food, and better liquor, and a sort of deco-pirate decor—but the shuffleboard table is forever." The newspaper's Heather Arndt Anderson included There Be Monsters in a 2017 overview of "where to eat and drink like a pirate in Portland". She wrote: "Why yes, Portland does want a British pub with an obliquely cartographic vibe. The haddock fish sandwich gives a Filet O' Fish a run for its money, or skip the bread and do the fish and chips, between these map-decorated walls."
