= Favela Brazilian Cafe =

Defunct Brazilian restaurant in Portland, Oregon, U.S.

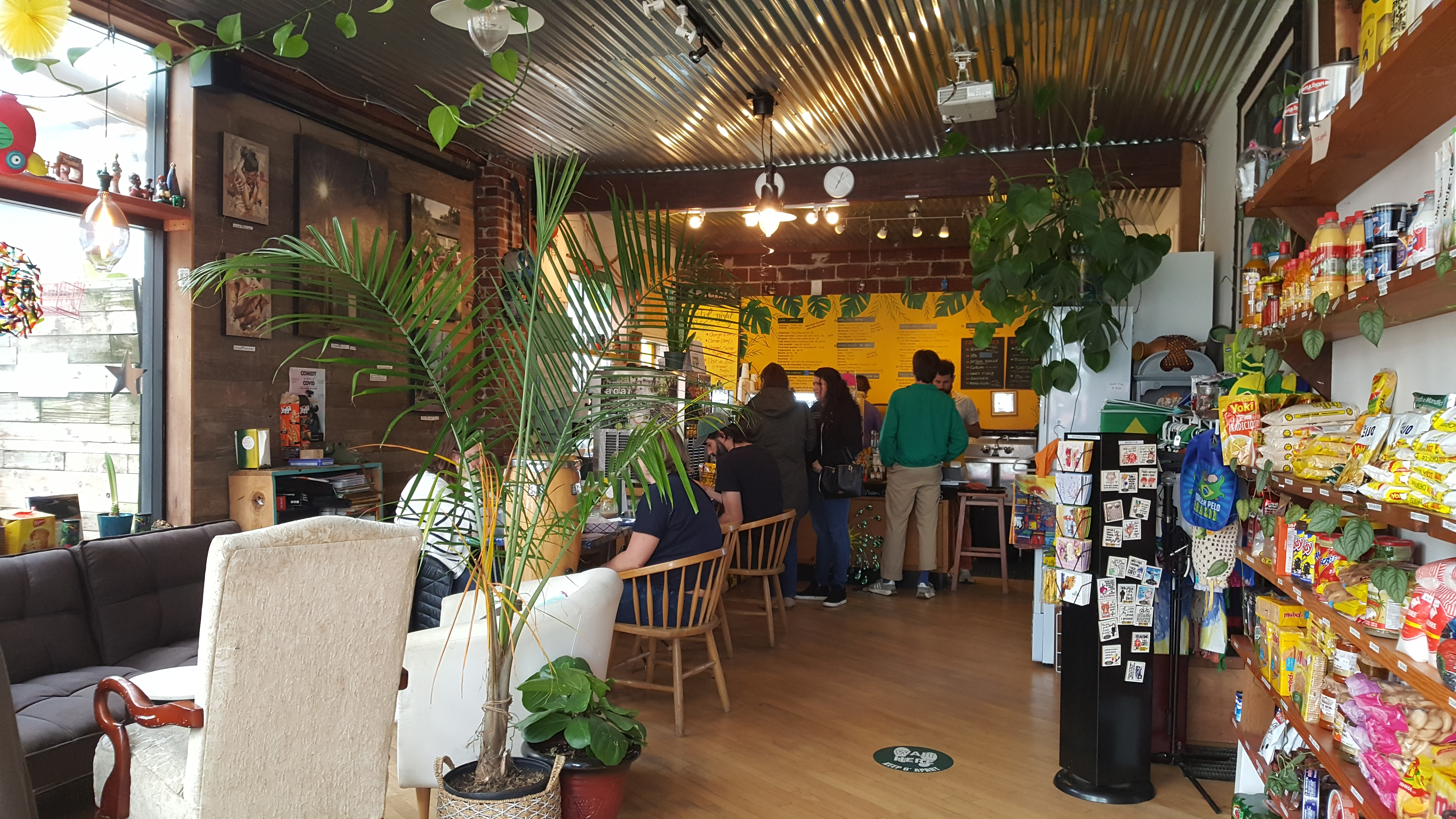
- The cafe's interior in 2022
- Interactive map of Favela Brazilian Cafe

Restaurant information
- Owners: Rodrigo Baena; Dunya De Souza
- Food type: Brazilian
- Location: 5300 Southeast Foster Road, Portland, Multnomah, Oregon, 97206, United States
- Coordinates: 45.4948°N 122.6080°W
- Website: favelabraziliancafe.com

Favela Brazilian Cafe was a Brazilian restaurant in Portland, Oregon, United States.

== Description ==
Favela Brazilian Cafe was a restaurant in southeast Portland's Creston-Kenilworth neighborhood at the border of Foster-Powell. Brooke Jackson-Glidden of Eater Portland described the business as "somewhere between a cafe, a Brazilian market, and a community center, with imported art and products to take home". She also called Favela "a meeting ground for Brazilian expats and those who want to learn more about the culture".

The cafe served Brazilian cuisine including pastries, sandwiches, fruits, desserts, coffee (including cafe doce de leite, or butter caramel coffee), juices, and smoothies. The menu also included pão de queijo (Brazilian cheese bread). The cafe hosted live music and events such as film screenings and Portuguese-language workshops.

== History ==
Owners Rodrigo Baena and Dunya De Souza opened the restaurant in 2019. Jackson-Glidden said Baena "wanted to create a space for the Brazilian immigrants and aficionados to meet and celebrate the country's culture". The business had a presence at Portland's Come Thru market in 2021.

Favela closed permanently and was replaced by Kainos Coffee in October 2024.

== Reception ==
Nathan Williams included Favela in Eater Portland's 2021 overview of "Where to Eat and Drink in Foster-Powell". The website's Zoe Baillargeon included the pão de queijo in a 2021 overview of "Where to Find the Cheesiest Dishes in Portland and Beyond", writing: "Toasty, freshly-baked balls almost always arrive warm and dotted with color, with a springy, soft, cheesy center. Those looking to double-down on dairy can add one of the cafe’s many cheesy sandwiches, whether it’s the melty queijo quente with tomato and oregano or the melty ham-and-cheese misto quente."

== See also ==
- List of defunct restaurants of the United States
