= Paragon (restaurant) =

Restaurant in San Francisco and Portland, Oregon, U.S.

Paragon Restaurant & Bar

Restaurant information
- Owner: Moana Restaurant Group
- Location: Portland, Oregon (2012–2018); San Francisco (1991–2017), United States

Paragon Restaurant & Bar, or simply Paragon, was a restaurant with two locations in the United States. The San Francisco restaurant closed in 2017, while the Portland, Oregon, location closed in 2018. The restaurants were owned by Moana Restaurant Group.

== San Francisco ==
The San Francisco restaurant operated from 1991 to 2017.

== Portland, Oregon ==
The restaurant in northwest Portland's Pearl District began serving brunch in 2012. Chef Lawrence "Rocky" Smith was nominated in Eater Portland's Hottest Chef competition in 2013. Bob Brunner was the restaurant's beverage director as of 2013.

In 2014, Thrillist's Drew Tyson described the restaurant as a "casually industrial eat/drink spot". The interior featured a fireplace, and the menu included a grilled cheese sandwich and tomato soup.

The Star, a pizza restaurant chain, moved into the Portland space after Paragon closed in 2018.
