= Henry Ford's Restaurant =

Defunct restaurant in Portland, Oregon, US

- Interactive map of Henry Ford's Restaurant

Restaurant information
- Established: 1970s
- Closed: 2003
- Location: Portland, Multnomah, Oregon, United States
- Coordinates: 45.45571°N 122.71512°W

Henry Ford's Restaurant was a restaurant in Portland, Oregon.

== History ==
The business operated from the 1970s to 2003.

== Reception ==
Erin DeJesus included Henry Ford's in Eater Portland's 2013 list of Portland's 19 most missed restaurants. She said the piano bar "is missed for its old-school steakhouse vibe". Dillon Pilorget included the restaurant in The Oregonian's 2016 list of "Lost landmarks: 30 Portland places you won't see again", writing: "The decidedly lounge-like restaurant employed a level of classy kitsch perfect for prom dates or an evening out with friends. The condos that went up after the restaurant closed in 2003 don't quite give the same vibe that the restaurant's bubble fountain and other quirky trimmings did for decades." The newspaper's Grant Butler included Henry Ford's in a 2016 list of "97 long-gone Portland restaurants we wish were still around". He wrote:

For 47 years, this Southwest Barbur Boulevard restaurant was a Portland favorite. Owner Henry Ford greeted diners when they came in, and worked the dining room with know-the-regulars charm. A meal here was like stepping into a time machine, with red-flocked wallpaper, crystal chandeliers, and a piano lounge with a 1950s vibe. The menu was a throwback, too, with dishes like Chicken Oscar that you could imagine Don Draper digging into with a second or third martini.
