= Overlook Restaurant =

Defunct restaurant in Portland, Oregon, U.S.

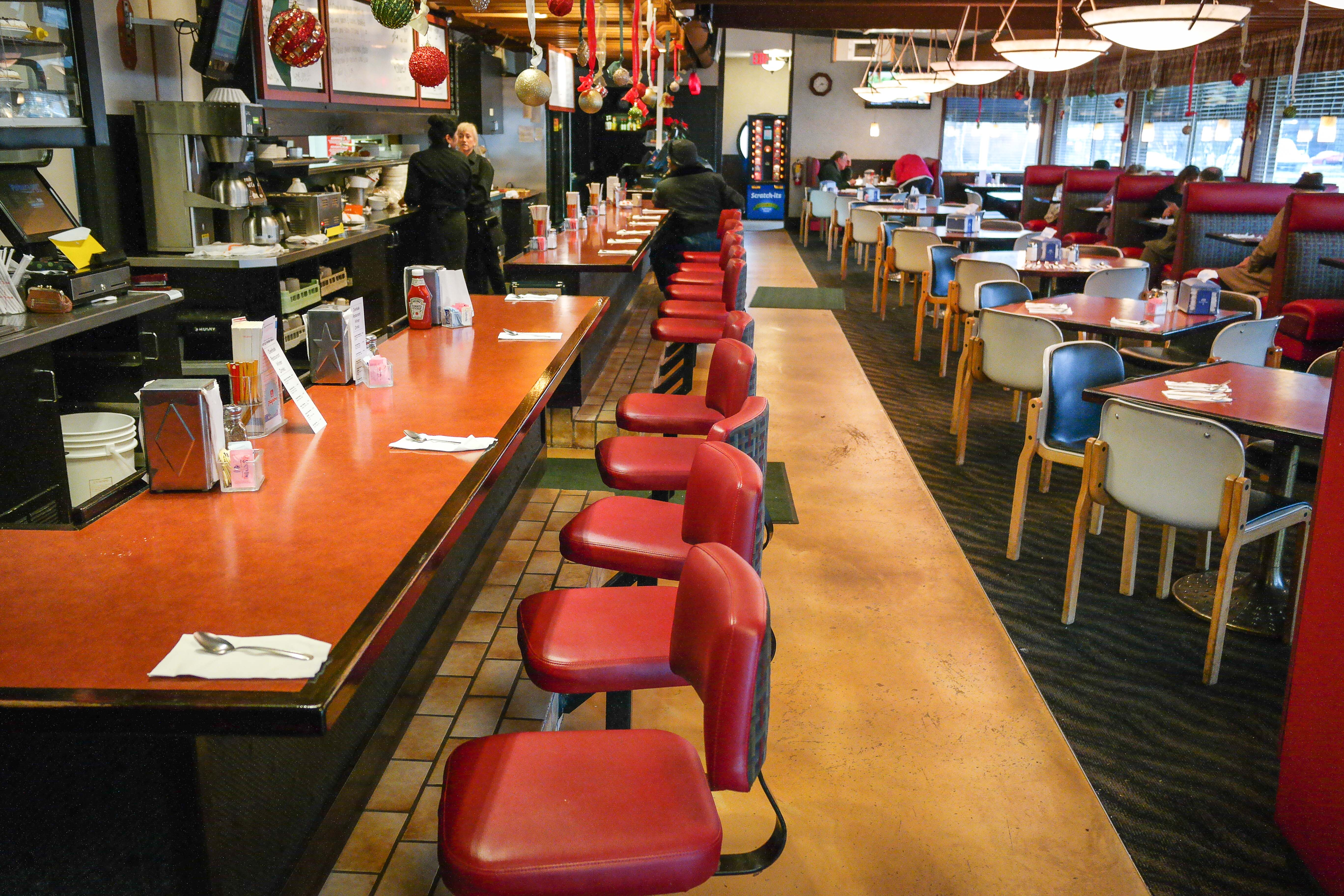
- The restaurant's interior in 2013
- Interactive map of Overlook Restaurant

Restaurant information
- Established: 1974
- Owners: Jim and Jane Sassalos
- Location: 1332 North Skidmore, Portland, Multnomah, Oregon, 97217, United States
- Coordinates: 45.55447°N 122.68057°W

Overlook Restaurant was a restaurant in Portland, Oregon, United States, operated by Jim and Jane Sassalos since 1974. The restaurant closed in January 2018.

== Description and history ==
Overlook Restaurant was located at 1332 North Skidmore, near the intersection of North Skidmore and Interstate, in Portland's Overlook neighborhood. It had been operated by Jim and Jane Sassalos since 1974.

In 2016, rumors began circulating that the restaurant would be closing. The Sassaloses initially denied immediate plans to close, but conceded, "Our business, per se, is not up for sale, but do they think we can just go on forever? At some point we have to have an end game. Wouldn't you if you were 80?" In March, documents filed with the Bureau of Development Services showed signs of the restaurant being replaced by an apartment complex.
