= Saucebox =

Defunct restaurant in Portland, Oregon, U.S.

- Interactive map of Saucebox

Restaurant information
- Food type: Asian fusion
- Location: 214 Southwest Broadway, Portland, Multnomah, Oregon, 97205, United States
- Coordinates: 45.5224°N 122.6777°W

Saucebox was an Asian fusion restaurant and bar in Portland, Oregon. Restaurateur Bruce Carey and chef Chris Israel opened Saucebox in 1995. The restaurant closed permanently in 2020, during the COVID-19 pandemic.

== See also ==
- Impact of the COVID-19 pandemic on the restaurant industry in the United States
