= Vault Cocktail Lounge =

Defunct cocktail bar in Portland, Oregon, U.S.

- Interactive map of Vault Cocktail Lounge

Restaurant information
- Location: 226 Northwest 12th Avenue, Portland, Multnomah, Oregon, 97209, United States
- Coordinates: 45.5248°N 122.6830°W
- Website: vaultpdx.com

Vault Cocktail Lounge, previously Vault Martini Bar, was a cocktail bar in Portland, Oregon's Pearl District, in the United States.

== Description ==
In 2016, Matthew Korfhage of Willamette Week described Vault Martini Bar as "a lounge-y refuge serving up umpteen versions of the classic martini, vodkatini or chocolatini". Later operating as Vault Cocktail Lounge, the bar had a Rick and Morty-themed drink menu and hosted disc jockeys.

== History ==
Vault Martini Bar was originally owned by Casey Hopkin. In March 2018, the owners of Vintage Cocktail Lounge purchased Vault Martini Bar. The bar began operating as Vault Cocktail Lounge, starting on June 1, with an updated interior and drink menu.

Vault closed by 2022. Collin Nicholas opened the bar Fools and Horses in the space.

== Reception ==
In his 2014 list of "30 fireplace-equipped PDX drinking spots", Thrillist's Drew Tyson wrote, "One of the premier and priciest cocktail lounges in The Pearl, Vault makes it worth the cost". The Portland Mercury's 2019 overview of "100 Portland Happy Hours" said:

Vault Cocktail Lounge’s selection of booze is as good as it gets, the staff brings their A-game, and the house cocktails are superlative concoctions... Plus, the happy hour nibbles... are far tastier than your usual happy hours.

In a 2019 overview of the most LGBT-friendly U.S. cities, Robert Deutsch of USA Today called Vault one of the "best LGBTQ hangouts" in Portland.
