= Victory Bar =

Defunct bar and restaurant in Portland, Oregon, U.S.

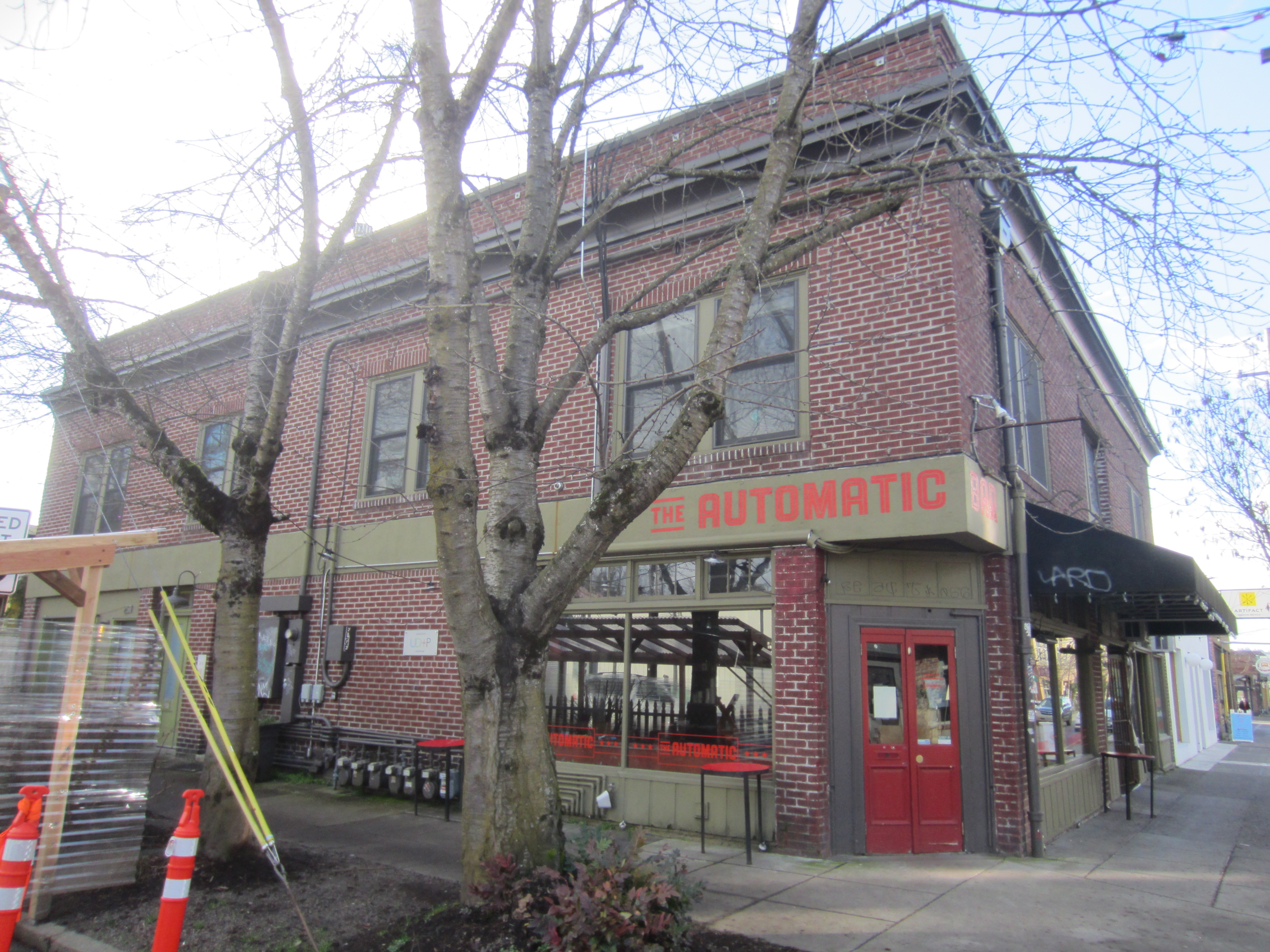
- 2021 photograph of the exterior of the building which housed Victory Bar prior to closing in 2019
- Interactive map of Victory Bar

Restaurant information
- Closed: June 14, 2019
- Location: 3652 SE Division Street, Portland, Multnomah, Oregon, 97202, United States
- Coordinates: 45°30′16.8″N 122°37′31.5″W

Victory Bar was a bar and restaurant in Portland, Oregon, United States. Victory closed in 2019.

== Description ==
Victory Bar was an Orwellian-themed bar and gastropub located at the intersection of Southeast 37th Street and Southeast Division Street in Portland's Richmond neighborhood. The bar had dated television screens broadcasting a collection of curated live music videos. The collection, called Victory Vision, featured performances by David Bowie, The Kinks, and The Who. The interior was decorated with propaganda posters reminiscent of George Orwell's dystopian novel Nineteen Eighty-Four (1949) and stripe-painted rifles. Initially, the bar served small plates for wine pairings, and later focused on Belgian beers. According to Willamette Week's Andi Prewitt, Victory offered "solid, affordable cocktails alongside warm and filling dishes like the perennial favorite spaetzle".

== History ==
Yoni Laos and Amalie Roberts opened Victory Bar in late 2006 or January 2007. Victory was named Willamette Week's inaugural Bar of the Year in 2013. The newspaper's Matthew Korfhage said at the time, the bar "isn't shiny or new or even particularly fashionable. It's just a goddamn winner."

Eric Moore was an owner, as of 2012. Laos was the sole owner, as of 2014.

On June 13, 2019, management unexpectedly confirmed plans to close of Facebook, posting: "It's the last nights of Victory my friends. Come say goodbye tonight or tomorrow." Victory Bar's last day of operations was June 14. Laos, who decided to move on to "new and more creative adventures", said of the closure:

When I was about five years old, growing up in a small town in Arizona, an old Obi-Wan Kenobi-type sage stopped me on my tricycle and he told me this: 'Son, if you want to make it big in this world... think about serving absinthe milkshakes to people while playing Dr. Hook music videos in the background.' I guess the moral of the story is this: Don't listen to strange old men wandering the sidewalks in their bathrobes... Portland sucks and is awesome at the same time. Geeze... I spent 13 years in this building. Can't a guy move on to new adventures?

Victory was replaced by a cocktail bar called The Automatic. Owner Andrew Finkelman said, "Victory Bar was open for 13 years and it was a classic bar, so I’m keeping the bones. I think people who liked Victory Bar will like The Automatic."

== Reception ==
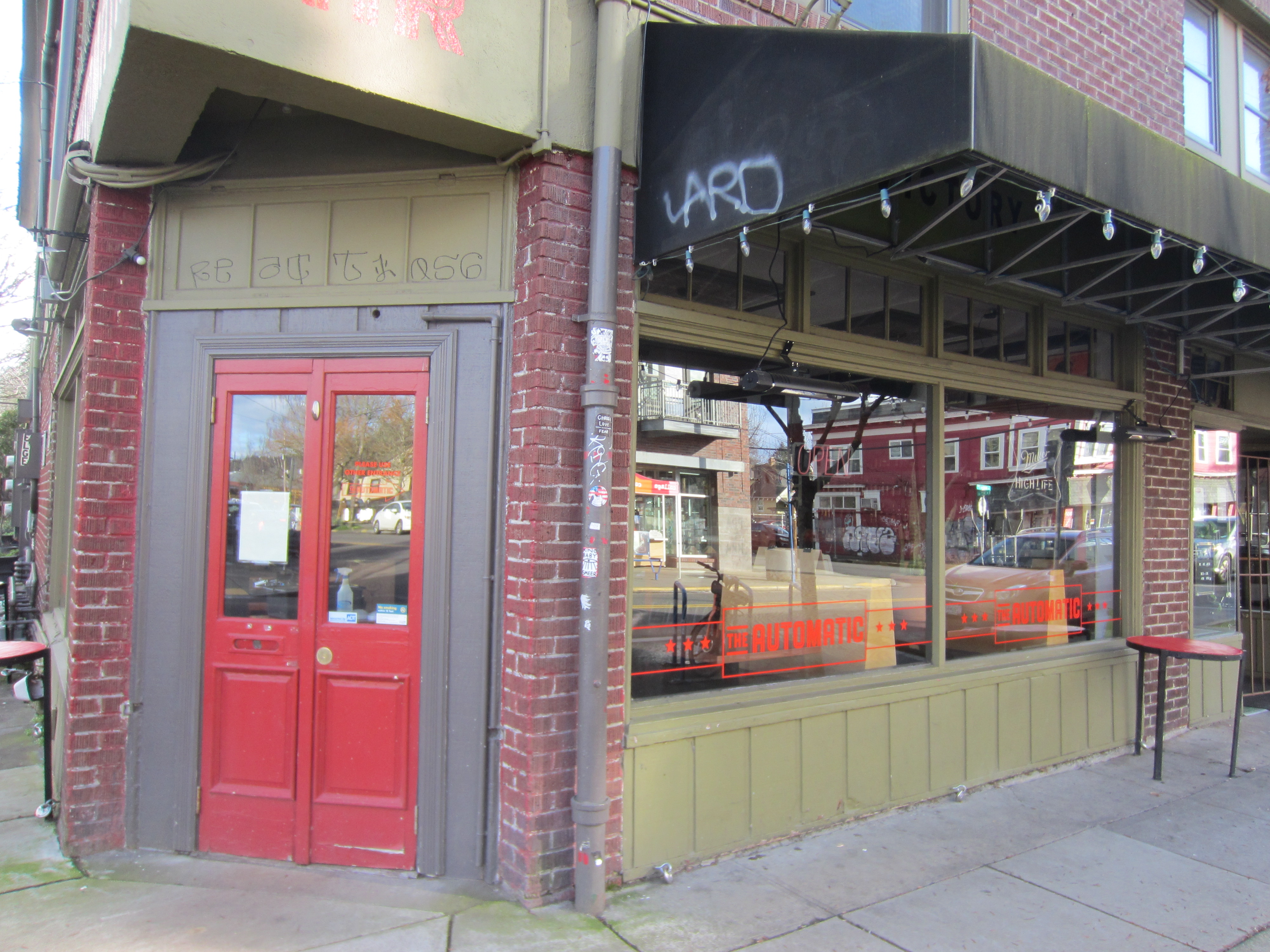
Front entrance of the building which previously housed Victory Bar, in 2021

The bar has been described as "beloved". Laurie Wolf included Victory in her 2012 list of recommended restaurants near Reed College for Serious Eats. Liz Crain included Victory in the list of "go to cheese service spots" in her Food Lover's Guide to Portland (2014), and Christian DeBenedetti included the bar in the Oregon portion of his 2016 book The Great American Ale Trail: The Craft Beer Lover's Guide to the Best Watering Holes in the Nation.

Samantha Bakall of The Oregonian included Victory in her 2015 list of "the 10 best places to get great beer and food in Portland", writing, "There's a charm you just can't put your finger on after a visit to Victory Bar." The newspaper's Michael Russell included Victory in his 2017 "guided tour of 12 great Portland theme bars", and rated the bar's commitment to the Orwellian theme 7 out of 10. In 2017, Willamette Week's Shannon Armour said Victory Bar is "like the unchanged bulwark of new Division Street" and wrote, "You really can't beat Victory’s lineup of comfort food, cocktails and awesome beers."
