= Bijou Cafe =

Restaurant in Portland, Oregon, US

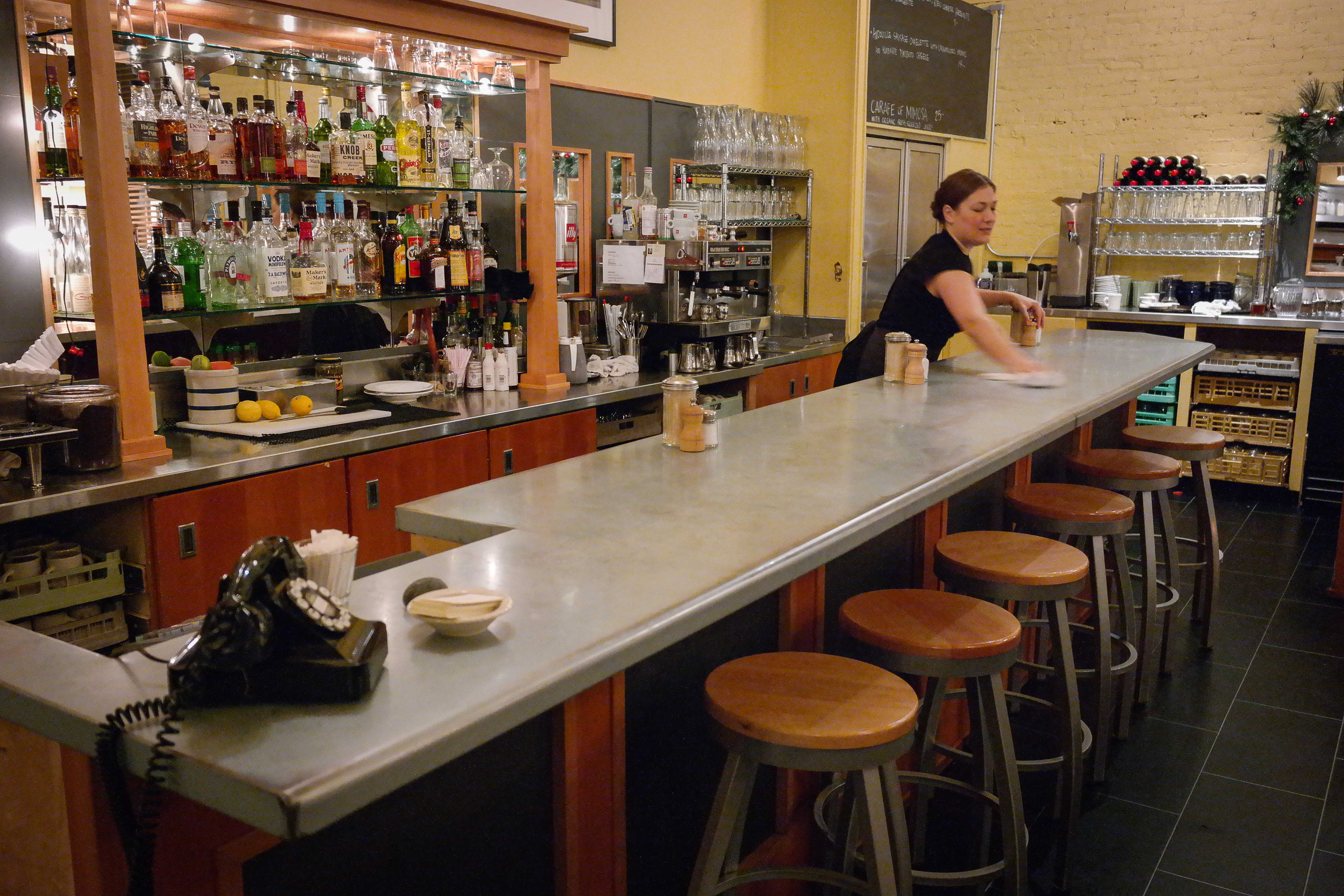
- The lunch counter at Bijou Cafe in 2014
- Interactive map of Bijou Cafe

Restaurant information
- Location: Portland, Oregon, United States
- Coordinates: 45.5217°N 122.6735°W

Bijou Cafe was a restaurant in Portland, Oregon's Old Town Chinatown, in the United States. The restaurant closed in 2020.

== Description ==
Bijou Cafe was a French-inspired restaurant serving American cuisine in downtown Portland's Old Town Chinatown. Fodor's described the cafe as a "spacious, sunny" space with high ceilings and live music.

== History ==
Bijou began serving dinner in January 2017.

The restaurant closed in 2020.

== Reception ==
Kristi Turnquist and Michael Russell of The Oregonian included Bijou in a 2019 "ultimate guide to Portland's 40 best brunches". Donald Olson of Frommer's rated the cafe 1 out of 3 stars and wrote, "It's a good spot for breakfast and lunch (dinner is only served Fridays, but then its accompanied by live jazz). This downtown fixture has remained in business because of its fresh organic food, and because it offers some specialties that you won't find elsewhere else in Portland... It's a nice, non-scenester Portland place to know about." Thrillist has called the lunch and dinner menus "great" but said "the real highlight is the brunch specials".

== See also ==
- Impact of the COVID-19 pandemic on the restaurant industry in the United States
