= New Copper Penny =

Defunct nightclub in Portland, Oregon, U.S.

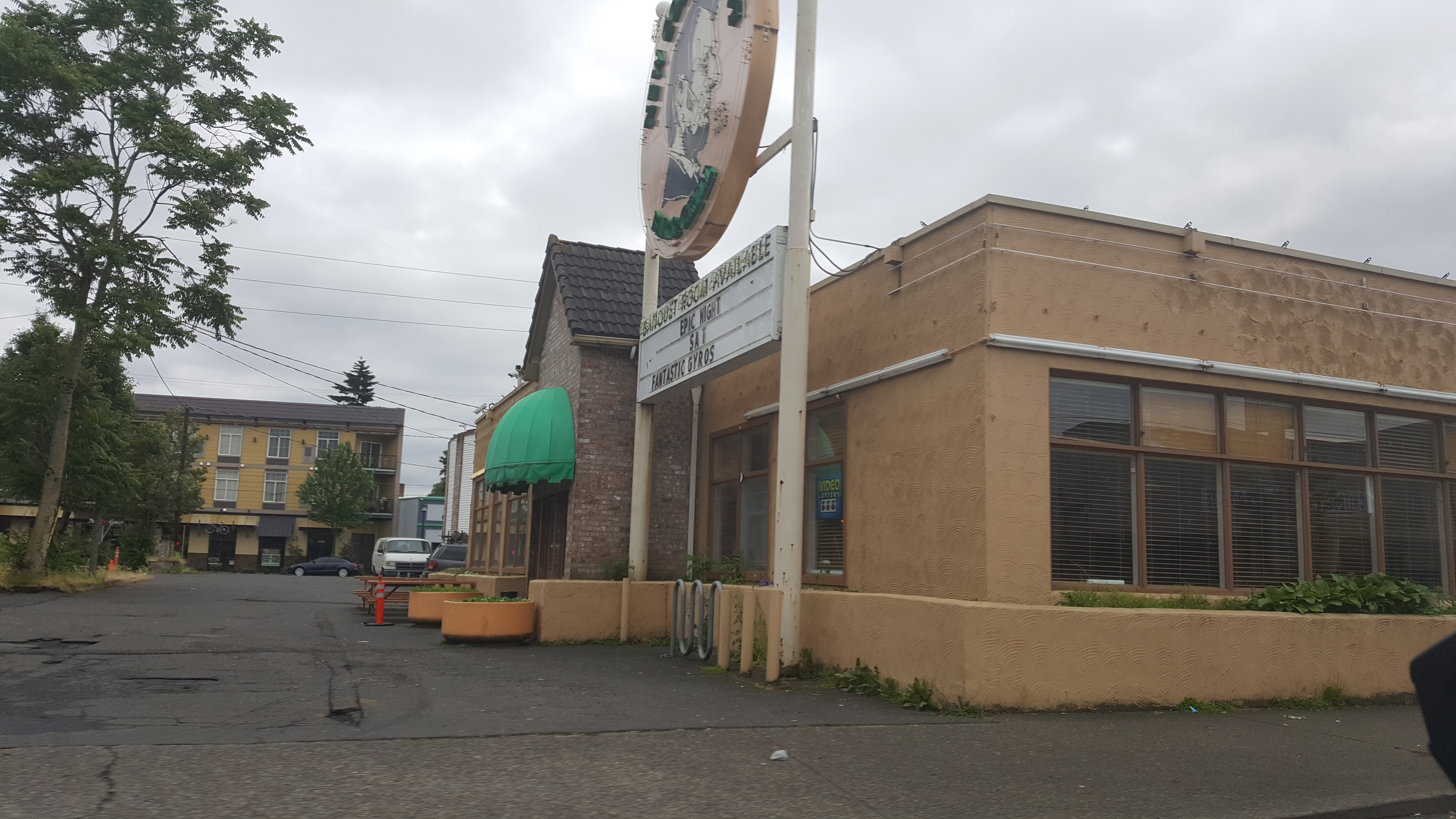
- The nightclub's exterior, 2016

- Location in Portland, Oregon
- Address: 5932 Southeast 92nd Avenue
- Location: Portland, Oregon, U.S.
- Coordinates: 45.47992°N 122.56846°W
- Owner: Saki Tzantarmas

New Copper Penny was a nightclub located at the intersection of Southeast 92nd Avenue and Foster Road in Portland's Lents neighborhood, in the U.S. state of Oregon.

As of December 2016, the building has now been demolished to make way for re-development into apartments.

== Description ==
New Copper Penny was a bar and nightclub in Portland's Lents neighborhood. The business had a 10-foot tall neon sign of a Lincoln cent.

== History ==
Owner Saki Tzantarmas started New Copper Penny after purchasing a bar in 1972. He died in 2017.

In 2014, Molly Young of The Oregonian described New Copper Penny as "a frequent trouble spot, according to neighborhood leaders, who say state regulators should step in to ensure against more incidents".

New Copper Penny was sold to a real estate developer in 2016. Owners applied to operate a business across the street.

== See also ==
- Culture of Portland, Oregon
