= Yaw's Top Notch =

Defunct restaurant in Portland, Oregon, U.S.

Restaurant information
- Location: Portland, Oregon, United States

Yaw's Top Notch was a restaurant in Portland, Oregon.

The original restaurant operated from 1926 to 1985. The business once employed 180 people. It was best known for its burgers.

The restaurant was revived by owner Stephen Yaw in 2012, but closed eight months later.
