= Portobello Vegan Trattoria =

Defunct Italian restaurant in Portland, Oregon, U.S.

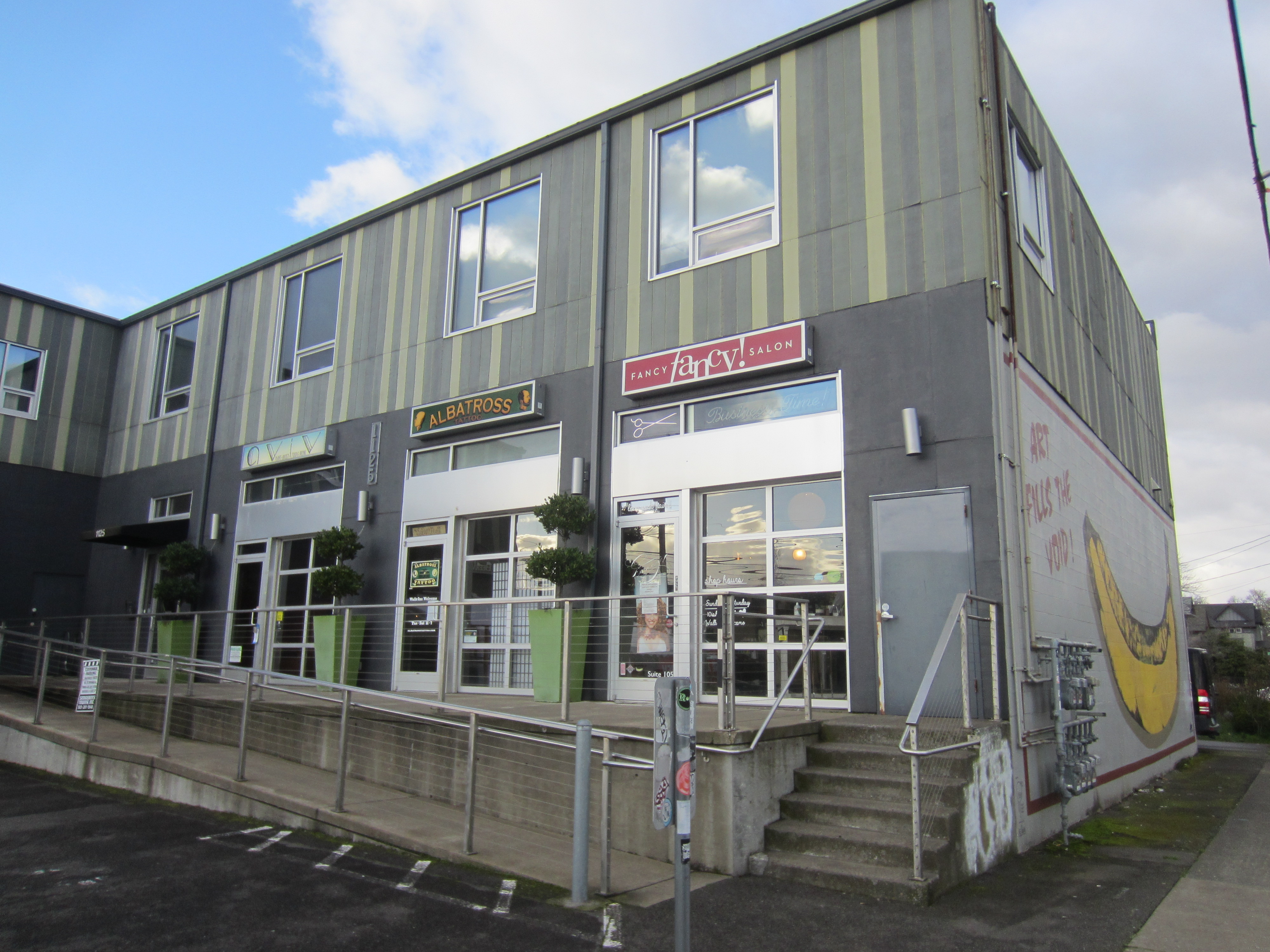
- Portobello Vegan Trattoria was housed in the Banana Building (pictured in 2021), in the space later occupied by Aviv
- Interactive map of Portobello Vegan Trattoria

Restaurant information
- Established: December 2008
- Closed: December 31, 2016
- Food type: Italian
- Location: 1125 Southeast Division St., Portland, Oregon, United States
- Coordinates: 45°30′18.8″N 122°39′14.9″W

Portobello Vegan Trattoria was an Italian restaurant specializing in plant-based cuisine in Portland, Oregon's Hosford-Abernethy neighborhood, in the United States.

== Description ==
Portobello Vegan Trattoria was an Italian restaurant in southeast Portland's Hosford-Abernethy neighborhood, housed in the Banana Building on Division Street. The menu included beet tartare, a beet burger, gnocchi, and ravioli. According to People for the Ethical Treatment of Animals (PETA), Portobello also served lobster mushroom potato cakes, tiramisu, and coconut ice cream. The restaurant offered a four-course tasting menu.

== History ==
The restaurant was co-founded by Dinae Horne and Aaron Adams in December 2008 or January 2009. In 2010, chef Adams represented Portobello in the first Vegan Iron Chef, presented by Try Vegan PDX.

Adams sold his part of the company in 2014.

Portobello closed on December 31, 2016, after hosting a New Year's Eve party. The restaurant was replaced by Heart Bar and later Aviv. In 2017, Portland Monthly said Portobello had "served as Portland's only all-vegan pizza spot for several years".

== Reception ==
In 2009, Patrick Alan Coleman of the Portland Mercury wrote, "Portobello is already making a mark in Portland and is set to be a favorite of vegans and omnivores alike. Sharing a space with Cellar Door Coffee, it's cozy while remaining refined and open relatively late. Swooning is permitted, as are passionate displays of ingestion."

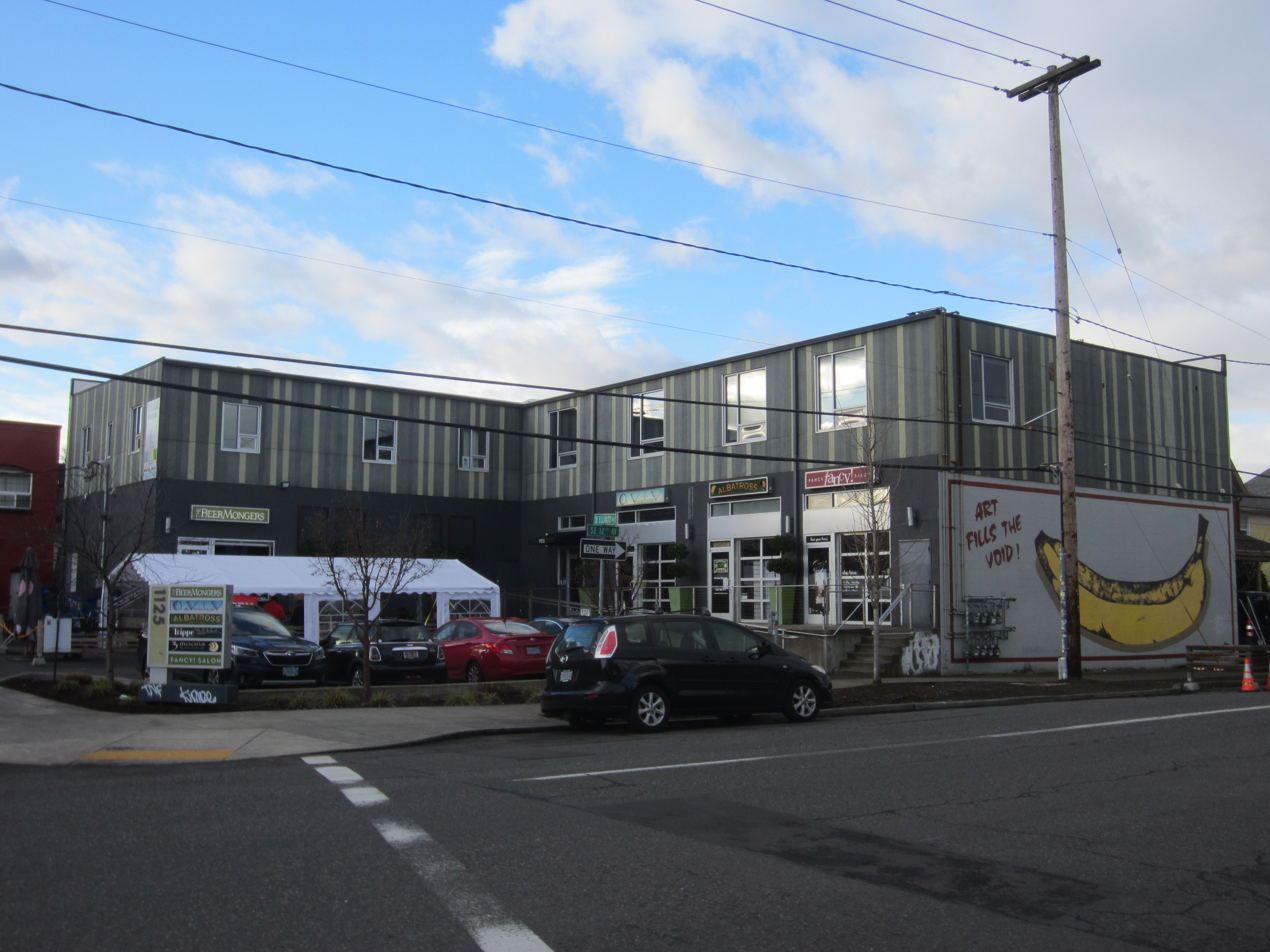
The Banana Building, which previously housed Portobello Vegan Trattoria, in 2021

In 2012, Grant Butler included the beet tartare in The Oregonian's list of Portland's 10 best vegan dishes and wrote, "Chef Aaron Adams is one of Portland's most creative vegan chefs, and his Southeast Division trattoria is one of the city's best Italian kitchens, producing dishes that strike the right balance between inventiveness and comfort. Adams insists on using the best ingredients, sourced for both their ethical and organic qualities, and he's fascinated with modernist cooking techniques."

In his 2013 review of Portobello, Butler said, "This Italian American restaurant strikes the right balance between approachable vegan fare such as pizza and homemade veggie burgers and inventive culinary whimsy from ... Adams, who currently is experimenting with how principles of molecular gastronomy can play out in plant-based fare. It's a daring approach that pays off, giving diners the choice between comfort and shazam." He said the four-course tasing menu "is one of the best deals around" and wrote, "Still not impressed by faux cheese? Portobello's plate of artisan nut- and tofu-cheeses could make you a believer."

Following the restaurant's closure, Eater Portland's Mattie John Bamman called Portobello a "pioneer in Portland's vegan cooking".

== See also ==
- List of Italian restaurants
