= Houston Blacklight =

Defunct bar and restaurant in Portland, Oregon, U.S.

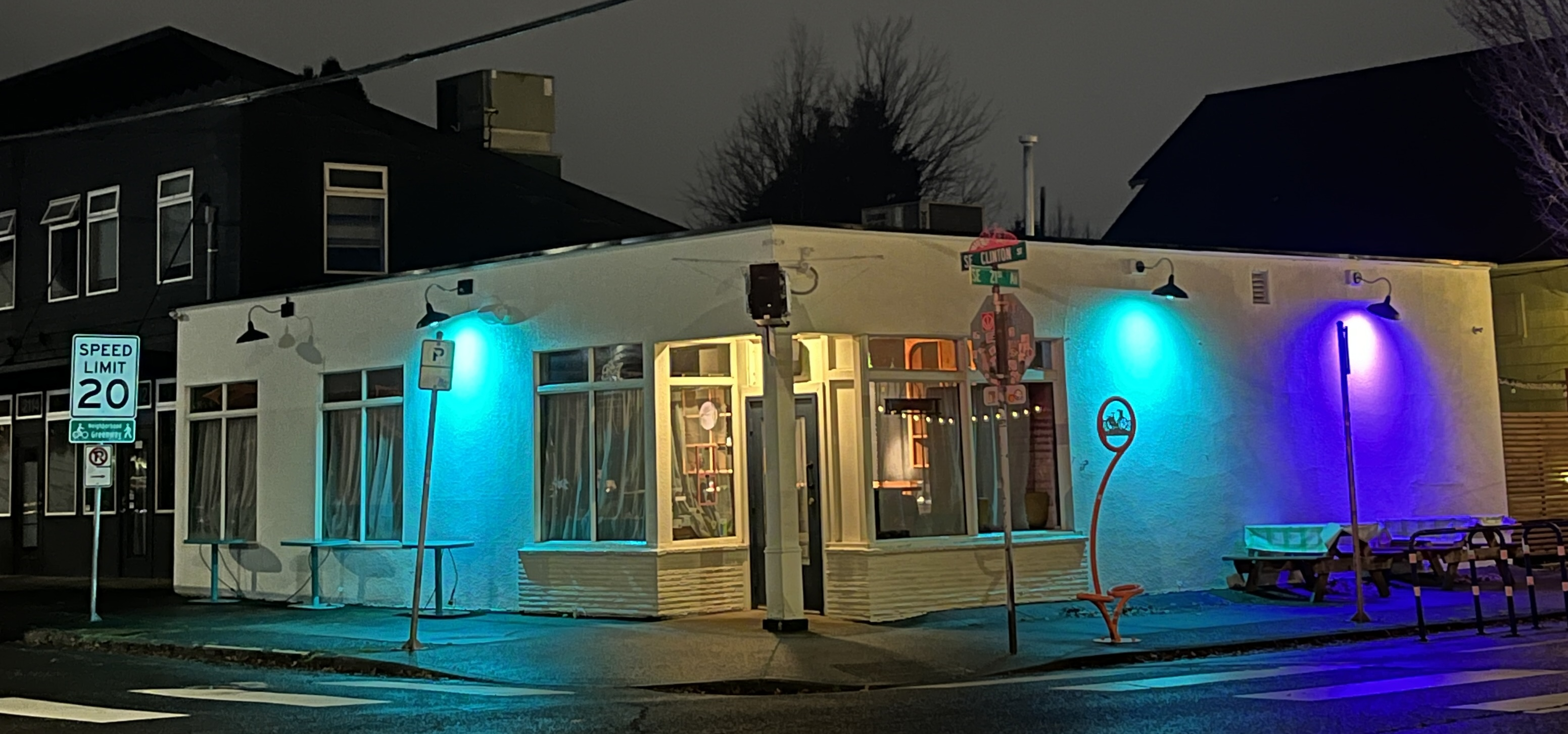
- Exterior of the bar at night
- Interactive map of Houston Blacklight

Restaurant information
- Established: July 2023
- Closed: November 2, 2024
- Owners: Thomas and Mariah Pisha-Duffly
- Location: 2100 Southeast Clinton Street, Portland, Multnomah, Oregon, 97202, United States
- Coordinates: 45.5032°N 122.6445°W
- Website: thehoustonblacklight.com

The Houston Blacklight was a bar in Portland, Oregon, United States. Established in 2023, Houston Blacklight was named one of the best new bars in the nation by Bon Appétit in 2024. It closed in November 2024.

== Description ==
The bar Houston Blacklight operated on Clinton Street in Southeast Portland's Hosford-Abernethy neighborhood. According to Eater Portland, the bar was "informed by Montreal's culinary scene, with things like cocktails in martini glasses with jell-O shrimp garnishes, French onion soup ramen, and Rhode Island-style salt-and-pepper squid".

== History ==
Thomas and Mariah Pisha-Duffly (Gado Gado, Oma's Hideaway) opened the bar in July 2023, in the space that previously housed Night Light Lounge. The bar hosted a seafood residency.

On October 28, 2024, the owners announced plans to close permanently on November 2. An online post read in part, "The truth is, we love the neighborhood, we love the bar, the team is incredible, but it has never been financially sustainable and we don't have the resources to give it another go".

The bar and restaurant Rhinestone began operating in the space in 2025.

== Reception ==
Bon Appétit included Houston Blacklight in a 2024 list of the best new bars in the United States. Michael Russell included Houston Blacklight in The Oregonian's list of the 21 "most painful" restaurant and bar closures of 2024.
