= Tapalaya =

Defunct restaurant in Portland, Oregon, U.S.

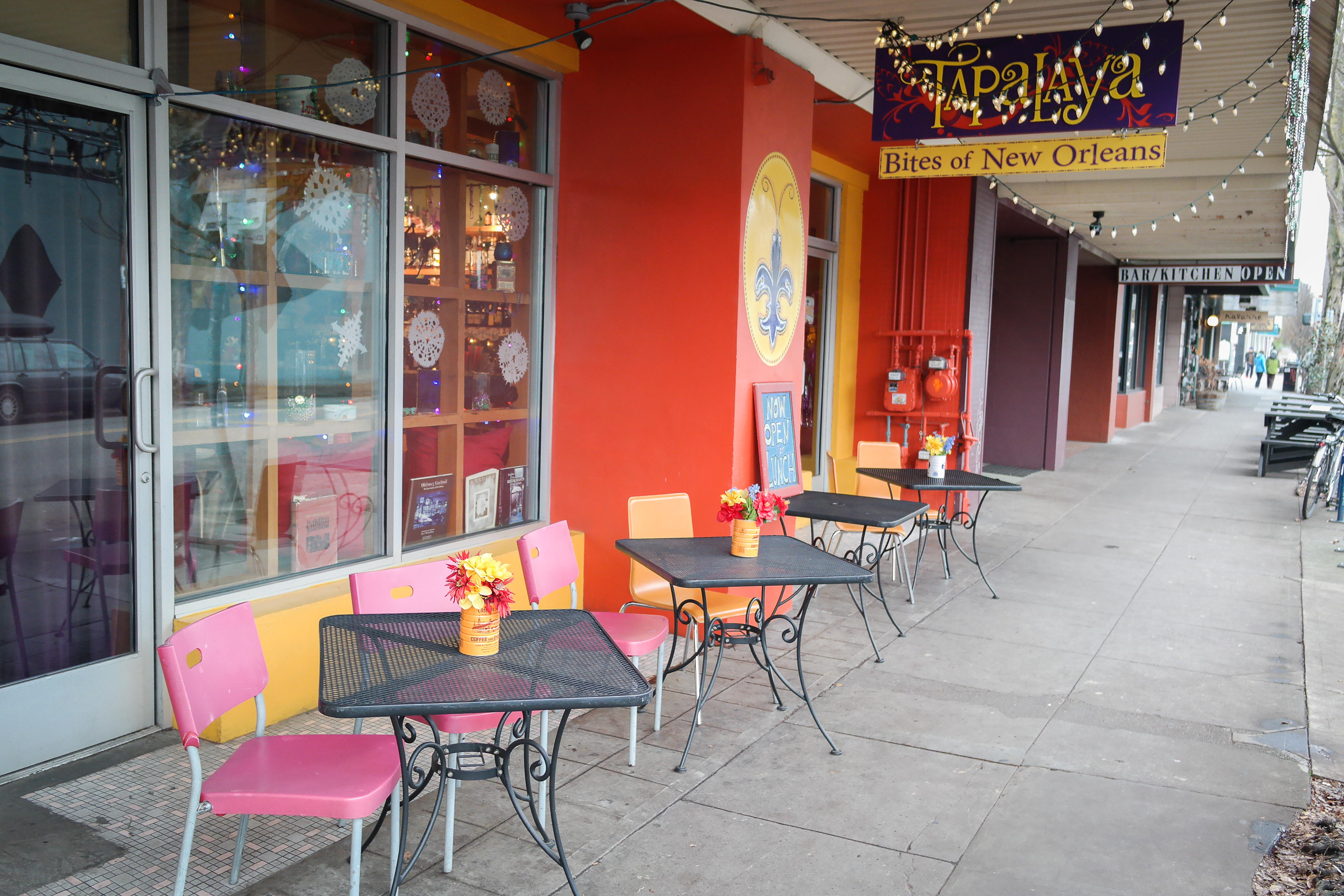
- The restaurant's exterior in 2013
- Interactive map of Tapalaya

Restaurant information
- Established: 2008
- Closed: 2019
- Food type: Cajun; Vietnamese
- Location: Portland, Multnomah, Oregon, United States
- Coordinates: 45.5234°N 122.6370°W

Tapalaya was a Vietnamese-Cajun restaurant owned by chef Anh Luu in the Kerns neighborhood of Portland, Oregon, United States. The restaurant closed in 2019, and was replaced by a vegan restaurant called The Sudra.

== History ==
Tapalaya opened in northeast Portland in 2008. In her role as head chef, Luu "rebooted" the restaurant's menu in 2014, then purchased Tapalaya in 2017. She competed on Chopped in 2015, and her "Chicken, Shrimp, and Andouille Sausage Gumbo" recipe was included in Portland Cooks, Recipes from the City’s Best Restaurants & Bars (2017).

The restaurant was burgled in February 2019, and participated in Portland Dining Month. It was included in the Portland Mercury's "100 Portland Happy Hours: Northeast" list in 2019.

Tapalaya closed in 2019 when Luu relocated to New Orleans. The Oregonian's Michael Russell included Tapalaya is his list of "Portland's most painful restaurant closures of 2019".

== Reception ==
In 2018, The Oregonian ranked Tapalaya one of North and Northeast Portland's 40 best restaurants.

== See also ==
- List of Cajun restaurants
- List of Vietnamese restaurants
