= Beaker & Flask =

Defunct bar and restaurant in Portland, Oregon, U.S.

- Interactive map of Beaker & Flask

Restaurant information
- Established: June 2009
- Closed: June 2013
- Owner: Kevin Ludwig
- Chef: Benjamin Bettinger (2009–2012); Anthony Walton (2012–2013)
- Location: 727 Southeast Washington Street, Portland, Multnomah, Oregon, 97214, United States
- Coordinates: 45.5188°N 122.6579°W

Beaker & Flask was a bar and restaurant in Portland, Oregon.

== Description ==
The bar and restaurant Beaker & Flask operated near the intersection of Sandy Boulevard and Washington Street in southeast Portland's Buckman neighborhood. Food & Wine called Beaker & Flask a "cocktail-driven restaurant", and Fodor's said the "chic" bar served "sophisticated" drinks. It had a green interior and a horseshoe-shaped bar.

== History ==
Beaker & Flask opened in June 2009. Kevin Ludwig was the owner. Benjamin Bettinger was an executive chef at Beaker & Flas, until 2012. He was succeeded by Anthony Walton, who left in 2013. Brandon Wise and Dave Shenaut also worked at the establishment.

Beaker & Flask launched an outdoor summer barbecue series in 2011. The restaurant closed permanently in June 2013. Taqueria Nueve later operated in the space previously occupied by Beaker & Flask.

== Reception ==
Beaker & Flask was Willamette Week's Restaurant of the Year in 2009. In 2009, Mike Thelin of Portland Monthly said the bar "is confident and comfortable enough to already feel like a Portland classic".
