= Auditorium and Music Hall =

Historic building in Portland, Oregon, U.S.

- U.S. National Register of Historic Places
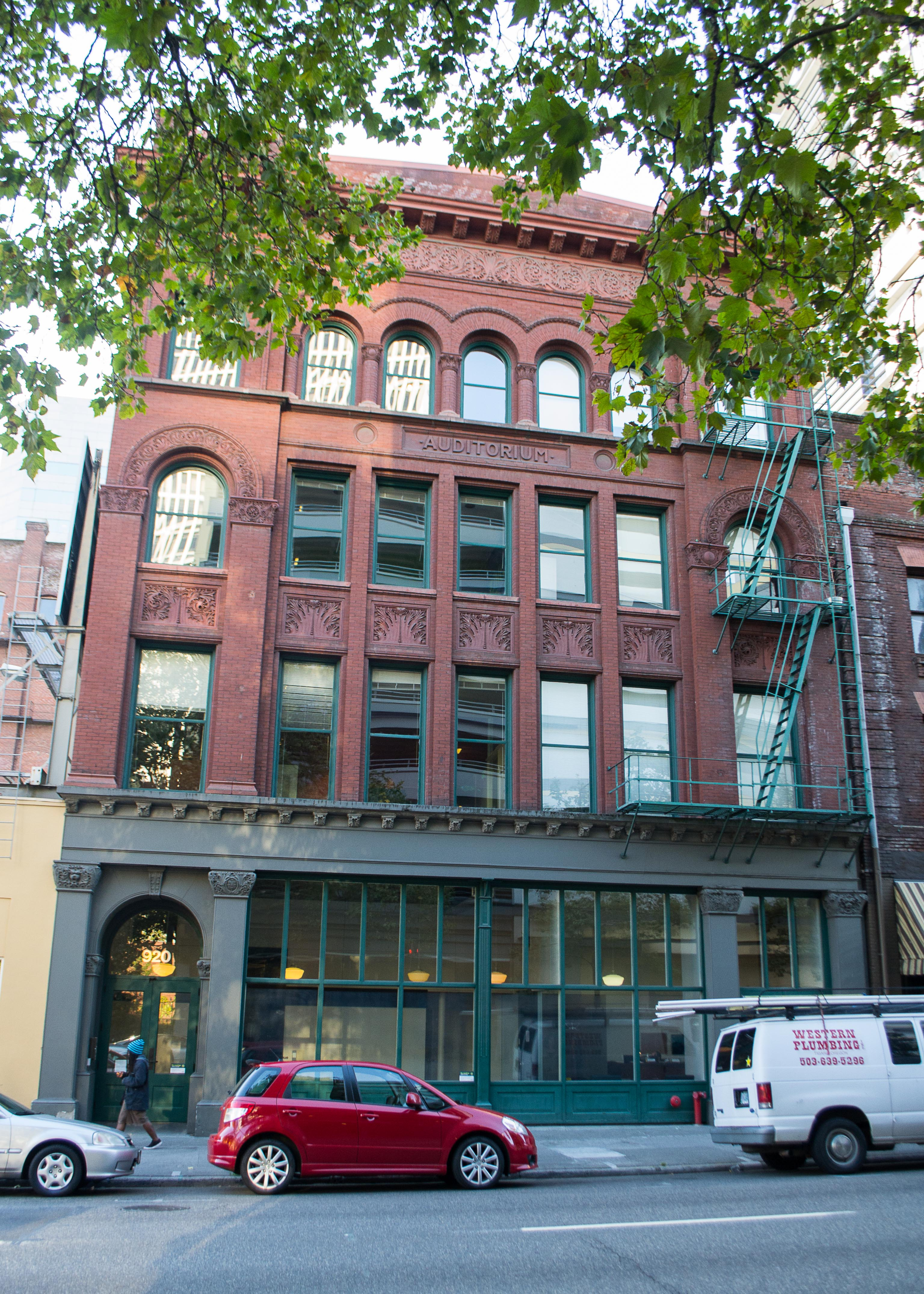
- The building's exterior in 2013

- Location within Portland, Oregon
- Location: Portland, Oregon, USA
- Coordinates: 45°30′59″N 122°40′34″W
- Built: 1895
- Architect: Frederick Manson White
- NRHP reference No.: 80003357
- Added to NRHP: 22 February 1980

The Auditorium and Music Hall is a historic building in Portland, Oregon, in the United States, designed by English architect Frederick Manson White. It was built by Emil C. Jorgensen and was completed in 1895. The building is listed on the National Register of Historic Places (NRHP).

== History ==
The Auditorium and Music Hall building has served several purposes throughout its lifetime since it was built for Emil C. Jorgenson in 1895. Originally, the first floor was occupied by a liquor wholesale business, the second floor was used for a dance hall, and the third floor was a mini concert hall. The next owner renovated the third-floor space into apartments, and the dance hall became a boxing gymnasium. It remained this way until 1960. Around the 1980s, the architectural firm Boutwell, Gordon, Beard, Grimes, invested $2 million to update and renovate the building. They renovated the first floor to resemble the building's original design, created offices on the second and third floors for their own personal use, and leased the top floor to other professionals.

== Description ==
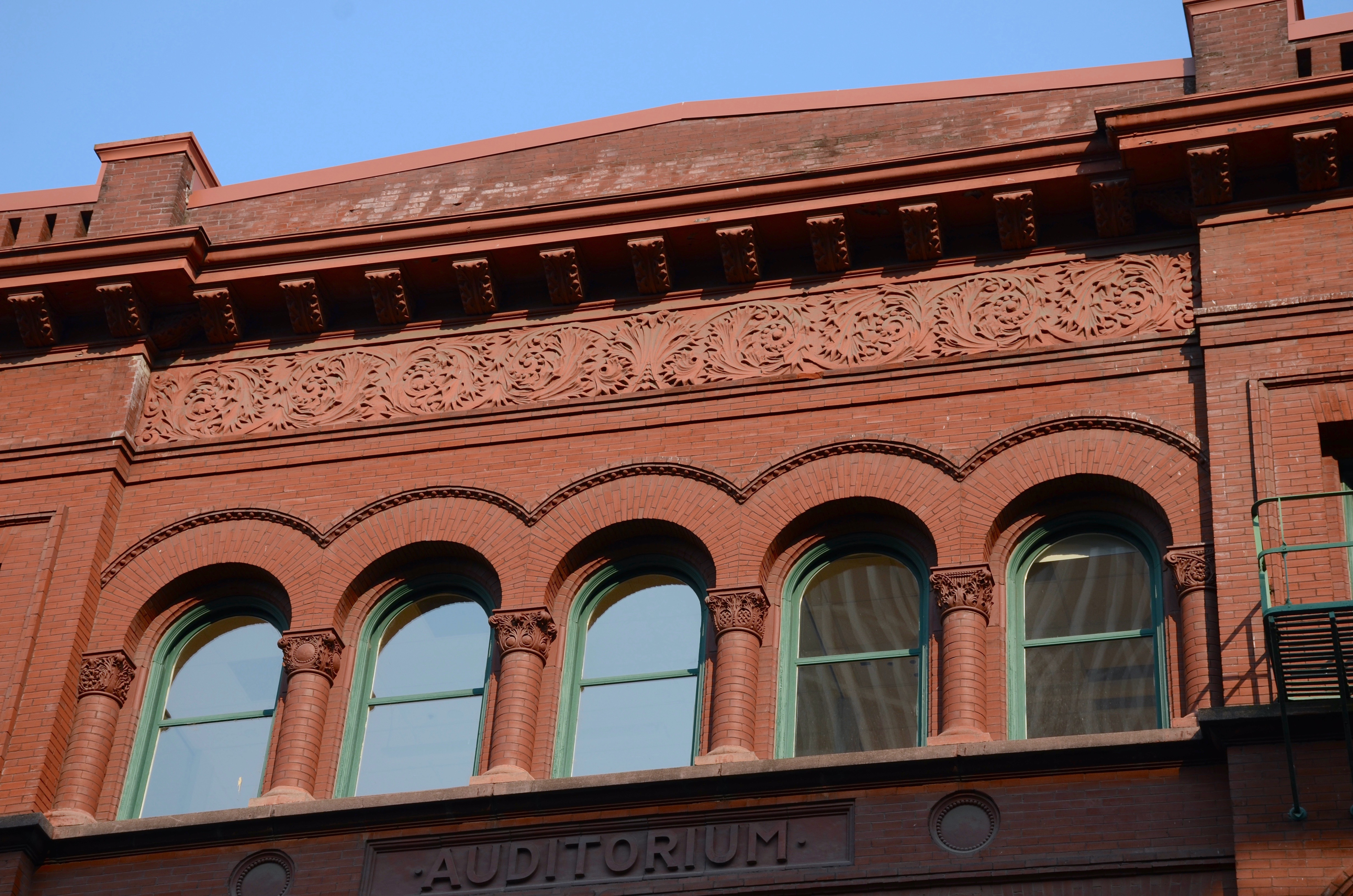
Detail of the building's front exterior, top floor, in 2017

Located in downtown Portland, near the waterfront area on lot 6, block 23, the Auditorium and Music Hall building is on the east side of SW Third Avenue, in the middle of the block between Salmon and Taylor Streets.

The foundation of the four-story building is composed of pilings, concrete footings, and brick piers. Walls and arches support the first floor of timber, while iron columns support the second floor of concrete and wood. The roofing is reinforced with timber trusses that cover the width of the building, creating space for the concert room's high ceilings, which feature a cove ceiling over a "space 27ft high, 42ft wide, and 72ft long."

The building incorporates the Romanesque Revival style, evidenced in the design of its façade, influenced by works produced by Louis Sullivan, Frank Lloyd Wright, and Henry Hobson Richardson. The terra cotta detailing on the façade is notable on the side arch capitals on the third floor. The plant motifs, seen directly on the stone capitals at the first level, are "organized in geometric patterns [and] display the strong influence of Louis Sullivan; a significant aspect of these decorative elements is their variety." This influenced White's design of the Auditorium building, which has elements of the Richardsonian Romanesque Revival style. Described as "interspersed with other coloured stones to accentuate doorways and windows. Rectangular blocks with little ornaments other than the play of voids and solids across the surface project enormous power and a sense of timelessness." This is seen in the design of the auditorium building's façade.

== Historical significance ==
Social life in Portland greatly influenced the design Frederick White incorporated into the Auditorium Building. During the 1840s and continuing into the 1880s, the population of Portland increased. As the city grew, the population developed a taste for various refined social and cultural activities. Starting in the 1850s, these activities included: music, theater, "parties, candy pulls, church socials, [and] dances." The population increased and the enjoyment of these activities easily expanded throughout the city. The arrival of the first transcontinental railway to Portland in 1883 made travel easier for performers, drawing more of them to the Portland area to satisfy demand.

Throughout the city of Portland several different types of theaters were developed to best fit the varieties of plays and operas that were traveling to perform in the city. By the year 1890, "Portland had six good-sized theaters with a total seating capacity of about 6,200. It also had a number of smaller places featuring various types of popular entertainment." The Auditorium, being one of these smaller buildings, catered to smaller performances. White's intentional inclusion of an auditorium and dance hall into the design was done directly to accommodate the social desires and attractions fitting to the era in which it was built.

== The architect ==
The architect of the Auditorium building was Frederick Manson White, born in Derby, England on March 18, 1863. He studied architecture in Paris, France at the École des Beaux-Arts where he adopted French, English, and Spanish styles of architecture. White was called to Portland, Oregon where he established a name for himself in the field of architecture. He is most famously known for buildings throughout the Portland area such as: the Portland Armory, First Presbyterian Church, the Dekum Building, and the Imperial Hotel. The Auditorium Building was his first independently commissioned project, and his design of the auditorium building stands as a testament to his skill and imagination as an architect. White was known for his work in the Richardsonian Romanesque style.

== National Register of Historic Places ==
In February 1970, the Auditorium building was nominated by the Portland Historical Landmark Committee, and placed on the National Register of Historic Places (NRHP) list to protect it from future renewal. It became a part of the NRHP because of the building's representation and connection to the Romanesque revival style, the significance of its design, and because the physical location of the Auditorium and Music Hall in downtown Portland is historically relevant.

== See also ==
- National Register of Historic Places listings in Southwest Portland, Oregon
