= Timothy Wastell =

American chef and James Beard Award winner

- Born: Michigan, U.S.
- Occupation: Chef
- Known for: Pacific Northwest cuisine
- Culinary career
- Current restaurant
- Old Pal (2026-present)
- Previous restaurants
- Antica Terra (c. 2016–2026); Sweedeedee; Old Salt Marketplace (2013–2014); Firehouse; DOC; Paley's Place (2008-2009); Tru (2007); La Tour; Game Creek Club (2003)
- Awardss
- James Beard Foundation Award for Best Chef: Northwest and Pacific (2025)

Timothy Wastell is an American chef based in Oregon. He received the 2025 James Beard Foundation Award for Best Chef: Northwest and Pacific for his work at Antica Terra in Amity, Oregon.

Wastell's work is associated with Pacific Northwest cuisine and an emphasis on seasonal ingredients and regional sourcing.

== Early life ==
Wastell is from Port Huron, Michigan. He later lived in Colorado before relocating to Oregon, where he continued his culinary career.

== Career ==
=== Early culinary career (2000s-2015) ===
In 2003, Wastell moved to Vail, Colorado, where he began working at Game Creek Club, a fine-dining restaurant located on Vail Mountain. He later worked as sous-chef at the French restaurant La Tour.

He completed a stage in 2007 at the now-closed Michelin-starred Chicago restaurant Tru.

Wastell later worked in several Portland-area restaurants, including Paley's Place, DOC, Firehouse, and Sweedeedee.

In early 2013, he was named opening chef at Old Salt Marketplace, a butcher-focused restaurant and food hall in Northeast Portland. He left Old Salt Marketplace in 2014.

=== Antica Terra (2016-2025) ===
Wastell joined Antica Terra in 2016, a winery in the Willamette Valley known for its tasting experiences. Food service at Antica Terra began with small pairings and event dining, and later expanded into multi-course lunches built around seasonal Oregon ingredients. Coverage described the program as part of winery dining trends in Oregon focused on local sourcing. By 2024–2025, Antica Terra was described in regional coverage as a destination dining experience in the Willamette Valley.

Wastell was a finalist in the James Beard Awards and received the award for Best Chef: Northwest and Pacific in 2025.

=== Post-James Beard Award (2026-present) ===
In 2026, Wastell left Antica Terra, citing a desire to reduce commuting and focus on work closer to his local community. He later joined Old Pal, a restaurant in Southeast Portland.

=== Agricultural and culinary collaborations ===
Wastell was a member of the board of directors for Portland Farmers Market from at least 2016 to 2020.

He has participated in events associated with the Culinary Breeding Network, an Oregon-based initiative that connects chefs, farmers, and plant breeders around crop development and regional food systems He has served as the organization's chef-in-residence.

He collaborated with the Oregon State University Extension Service on winter squash research projects, evaluating varieties over multiple storage seasons and providing culinary feedback on their use, including applications such as raw preparations in salads and recipe development.

His involvement in farm-to-table dining has included participation in events such as Outstanding in the Field. He has also worked with producers at Portland-area farmers markets, including Groundwork Organics at the Shemanski Park Farmers Market in downtown Portland.

== Culinary style ==
Wastell's cooking is associated with Pacific Northwest cuisine, with emphasis on seasonal ingredients and regional sourcing. His work has been described in coverage as part of Oregon's farm-to-table dining culture.

== Awards and honors ==
- James Beard Foundation Award for Best Chef: Northwest and Pacific (2025)
