= Dime Store (Portland, Oregon) =

Defunct restaurant in Portland, Oregon, U.S.

The Dime Store

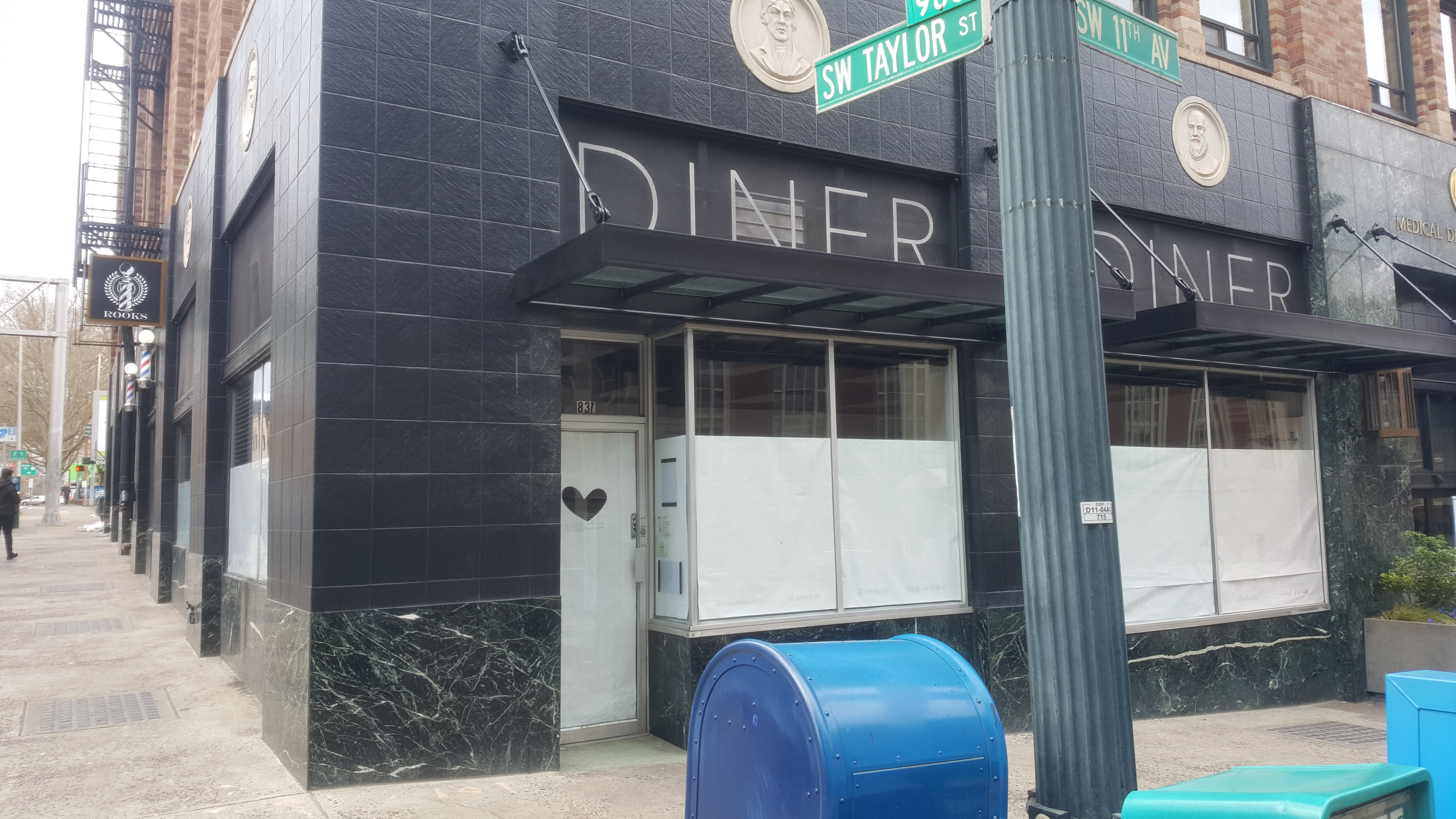
- The restaurant's exterior in March 2016, after closing in November 2015
- Interactive map of The Dime Store

Restaurant information
- Established: 2014
- Closed: November 2015
- Previous owner: Dayna McErlean
- Food type: American
- Dress code: Casual
- Location: 837 Southwest 11th Avenue, Portland, Multnomah, Oregon, 97205, United States
- Coordinates: 45.51909°N 122.68400°W
- Reservations: No
- Website: dimestorepdx.com

The Dime Store was a short-lived restaurant in Portland, Oregon, in the United States. It was established by Dayna McErlean, with additional conceptual development from Jeremy Larter. The restaurant opened in 2014, replacing Leo's Non-Smoking Coffee Shop, a diner which had operated for thirty years. The Dime Store's menu included diner classics such as burgers and milkshakes, along with all-day breakfast and weekend brunch specials. Despite garnering a positive reception, the restaurant closed in November 2015.

== Description ==
The Dime Store was a restaurant housed in the first floor corner of the Medical Dental Building (837 Southwest 11th Avenue) in downtown Portland. Its menu was created by Claire Miller and included American diner classics such as burgers, ice cream floats, milkshakes, sundaes, and other desserts, as well as upscale diner food and healthy food options with a farmers' market influence.

The all-day breakfast menu included buttermilk biscuits and gravy, Water Avenue coffee, fried egg sandwiches, pancakes, and scrambled egg specials. The lunch menu included sandwiches (BLT, club, falafel, grilled cheese, meatloaf), salads, and soups. The Dime Store's weekend brunch menu featured Eggs Benedict, French-style omelettes, and the "Boss-Lady's Breakfast", which included braised greens, fried egg, and sausage. Brunch cocktails included Bloody Marys, mimosas, and Salty Dogs. Its beer, cocktail, and wine selection was curated by Nick Ramsdell. One milkshake special featured Salt & Straw, a Portland-based artisanal ice cream company.

The restaurant featured a horseshoe-shaped kiosk-style counter displaying coffee, pastries, sandwiches, and a variety of 25 periodicals supplied by The City Reader, a Modern Newsstand on Southeast Division. It was described as a "shinier" version of the coffee shop which had occupied the same space for thirty years prior, with grey and red linoleum flooring and teal pleather or vinyl seating.

== History ==
The restaurant replaced Leo's Non-Smoking Coffee Shop, which was owned by Peter and Jane Chan for thirty years. When Leo's closed in February 2014, rumors had already circulated about restaurateur and developer Dayna McErlean's plans to open a more upscale diner.

The Dime Store's concept was created by McErlean and Jeremy Larter, and was inspired by the soda shops they both experienced growing up on the East Coast. Prior to the restaurant's opening, plans were to serve breakfast and lunch during mid-week hours, with the potential to later add happy hour and family-friendly dinner options, as well as outdoor seating. The Dime Store opened in the early summer of 2014 (June–July), with a grand opening on June 16. It began operating with a limited menu during the hours of 7 am to 3 pm; hours were later extended to 6 pm. The restaurant's weekend brunch launched in July, offering a larger menu from 9 am to 3 pm.

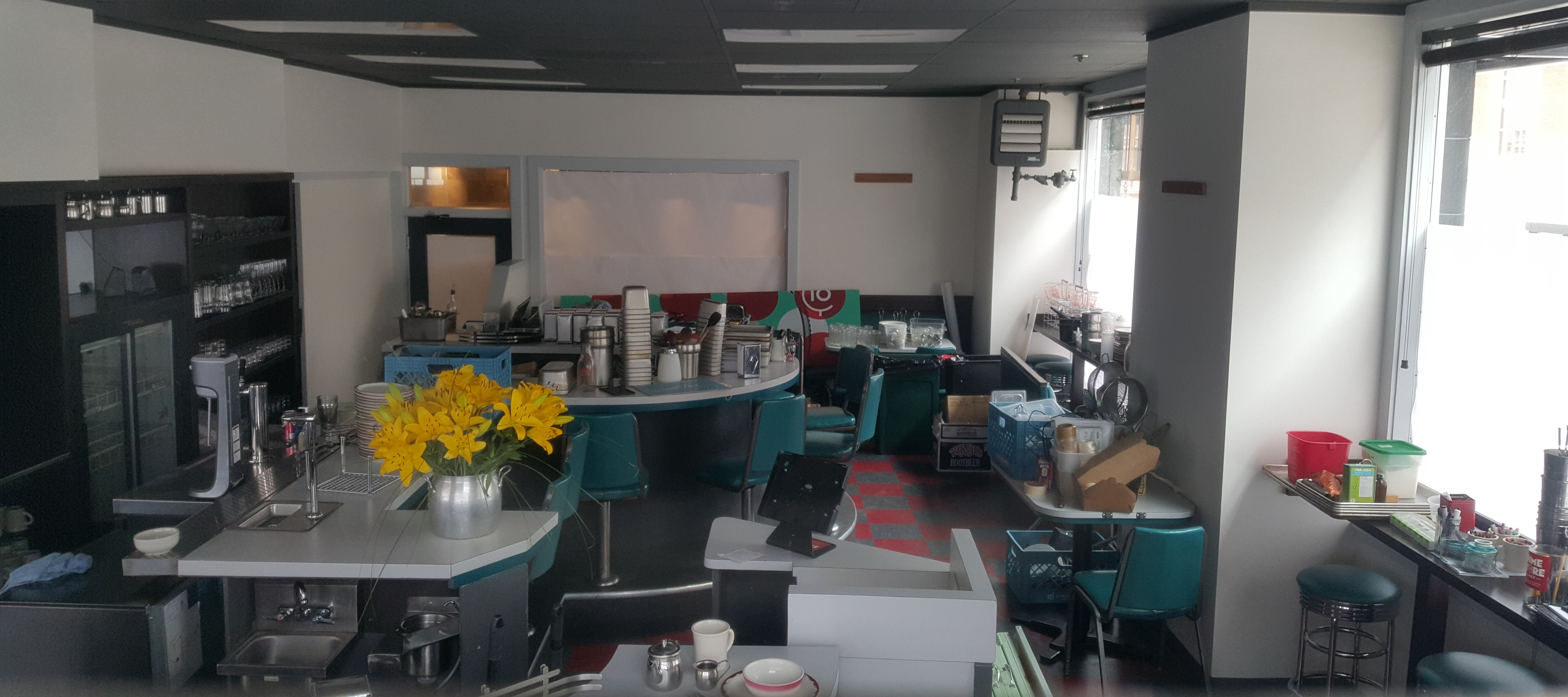
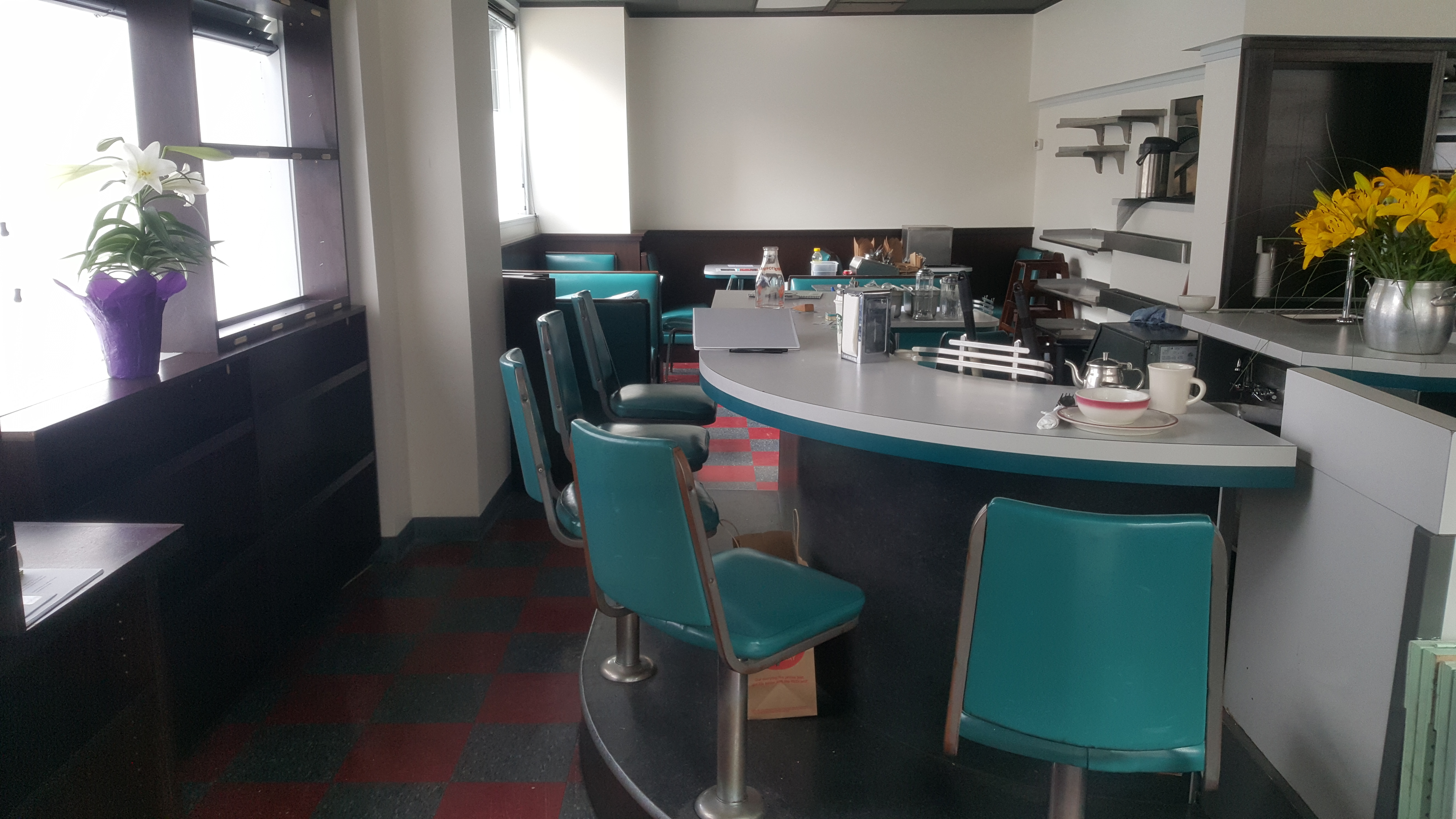
The diner's interior in March 2016

The restaurant closed in November 2015. The owners posted online, "It was a hard decision but sadly we have decided to close our doors. Thanks to everyone that's supported us and have dined with us. We will miss you all and happy holidays!" Willamette Week's Martin Cizmar attributed the diner's closure to its location and lack of nearby foot traffic. Oregon Liquor Control Commission documentation from March 2016 shows an application for a tradename update to The Daily Feast.

== Reception ==
Fodor's called The Dime Store "bright and hip", offering "office workers and hotel guests a much-appreciated source of seasonally driven, well-prepared comfort fare". Cizmar wrote a positive review of the restaurant in August 2014, in which he paid tribute to Leo's and described his two $1 extras (an egg on his BLT and maple syrup for his pancakes) as "the best two dollars [he] spent all week". That same month, Thrillist contributor Drew Tyson included the diner in his list of Portland's eleven best new restaurants, writing:

Billing itself as a "finer diner", this old-school space feels a bit like the diner in Twin Peaks. There's a magazine and candy counter in one corner that no one seems to touch; just quick enough service that once you start questioning whether or not you'll get another cup of coffee, one arrives; plus a menu full of classics. All-in-all it's one of the only places you can go in Downtown and feel like you're transported somewhere else entirely.

The Portland Mercury's Andrea Damewood wrote:

Dime Store is its own thing, a great place to grab lemony eggs benedict and a Water Avenue coffee on a Sunday without a massive line. Sure, there's vintage milk bottles as water pitchers, "Hound Dog" blasting from the speakers, and a big-old 1950s vibe going on—but you're not going to feel like some asshat in a retro-themed chain here ... There's no life-changing or avant-garde cooking happening at Dime Store. You won't see coffee mayo and duck bologna like Vitaly Paley's crew puts out at Penny Diner. You won't find the greasy hash browns available at the actual old-school diners. But that's kind of the point. Dime Store is a sweet slice of nostalgia with just the right nod to current dining realities.

In 2015, The Oregonian included the diner's "Dime Burger" as one of five "burger classics" in its list of the city's 100 best "cheap eats". The newspaper later included The Dime Store in its list of the "top 10 Portland restaurant closings of 2015".

== See also ==
- List of diners
