= Medical Dental Building =

Medical Dental Building may refer to:

- Medical Dental Building (Dallas, Texas), listed on the National Register of Historic Places (NRHP)
- Medical Dental Building (Portland, Oregon)
- Medical Dental Building (Seattle, Washington), NRHP-listed
