= Frederick Manson White =

F. Manson White
- Born: November 20, 1854; Derby, England
- Died: April 23, 1952 (aged 89); Portland, Oregon, U.S.
- Occupation: Architect

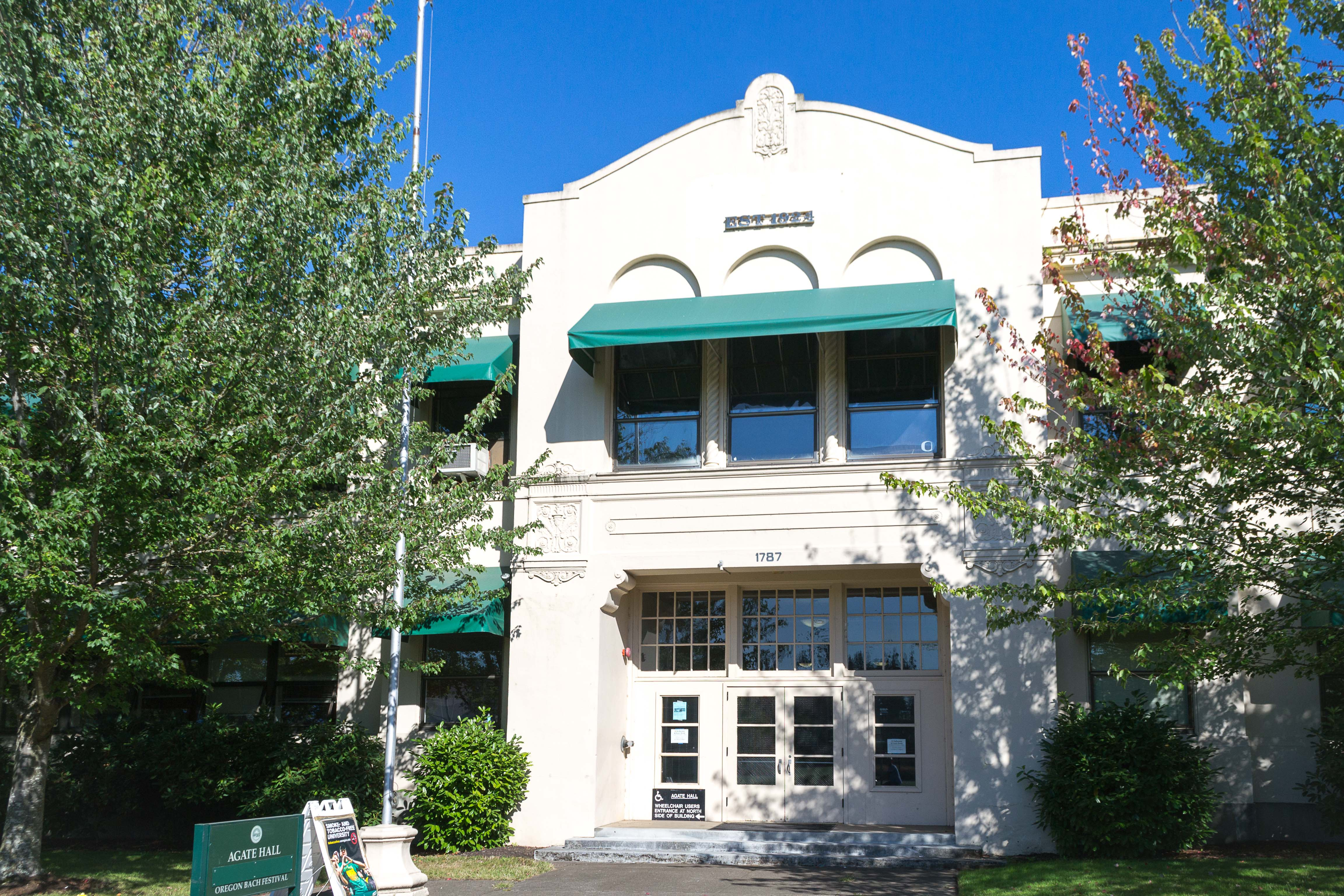
Agate Hall at the University of Oregon

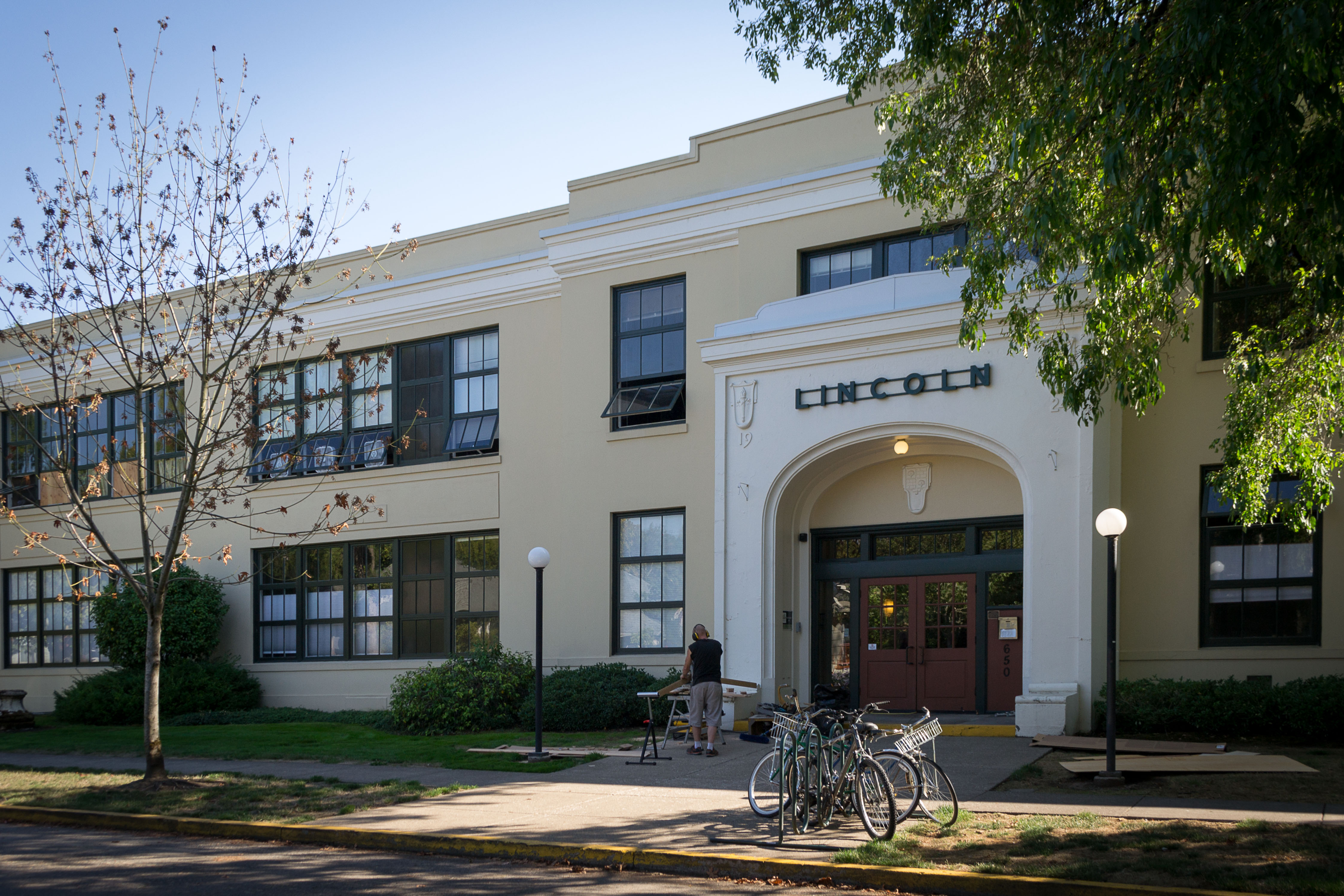
Lincoln School Condominiums in Eugene

Frederick Manson White (March 18, 1863 – April 23, 1952), commonly known as F. Manson White, was an American architect based in Portland, Oregon. White was known for his work in the Richardsonian Romanesque style. Among the buildings he helped design, as part of the firm McCaw, Martin and White, or designed as a sole practitioner, are several that are on the National Register of Historic Places. These include the Imperial Hotel (now the Hotel Vintage Portland), Waldschmidt Hall at the University of Portland, the Dekum Building, the Auditorium and Music Hall, the Sherlock Building, the Flatiron Building (now Ringler's Annex), Woodrow Wilson Junior High School (now Lincoln School Condominiums) and the John G. Shedd Institute for the Arts in Eugene, the First Presbyterian Church in Medford (part of the Medford Downtown Historic District), and the Corvallis Hotel in Corvallis. White also designed Agate Hall (originally Roosevelt Junior High School and later Condon School) on the campus of the University of Oregon, and the Central Presbyterian Church (aka Old Laurelhurst, or The Bible Church) in Portland.

Some sources have reported that White was the nephew of the prominent New York architect Stanford White, although this reported relationship has been seriously questioned.
