= Antica Terra =

Winery in Amity, Oregon, U.S.

- Location: Amity, Oregon, United States
- Coordinates: 45°7′11″N 123°10′59″W
- Appellation: Eola-Amity Hills AVA
- Founded: 2005
- First vines planted: 1989
- First vintage: 2006
- Key people: John Mavredakis, Scott Adelson, Michael Kramer, Maggie Harrison
- Area cultivated: 11
- Cases/yr: 2000
- Varietals: Pinot noir, Chardonnay
- Distribution: Wine club, mailing list, some regional distribution
- Tasting: Open to public
- Website: anticaterra.com

Antica Terra is a winery and restaurant in Amity, Oregon, United States. Timothy Wastell won in the Best Chef: Northwest and Pacific category of the James Beard Foundation Awards in 2025.
