= Frank Dekum =

American merchant and banker

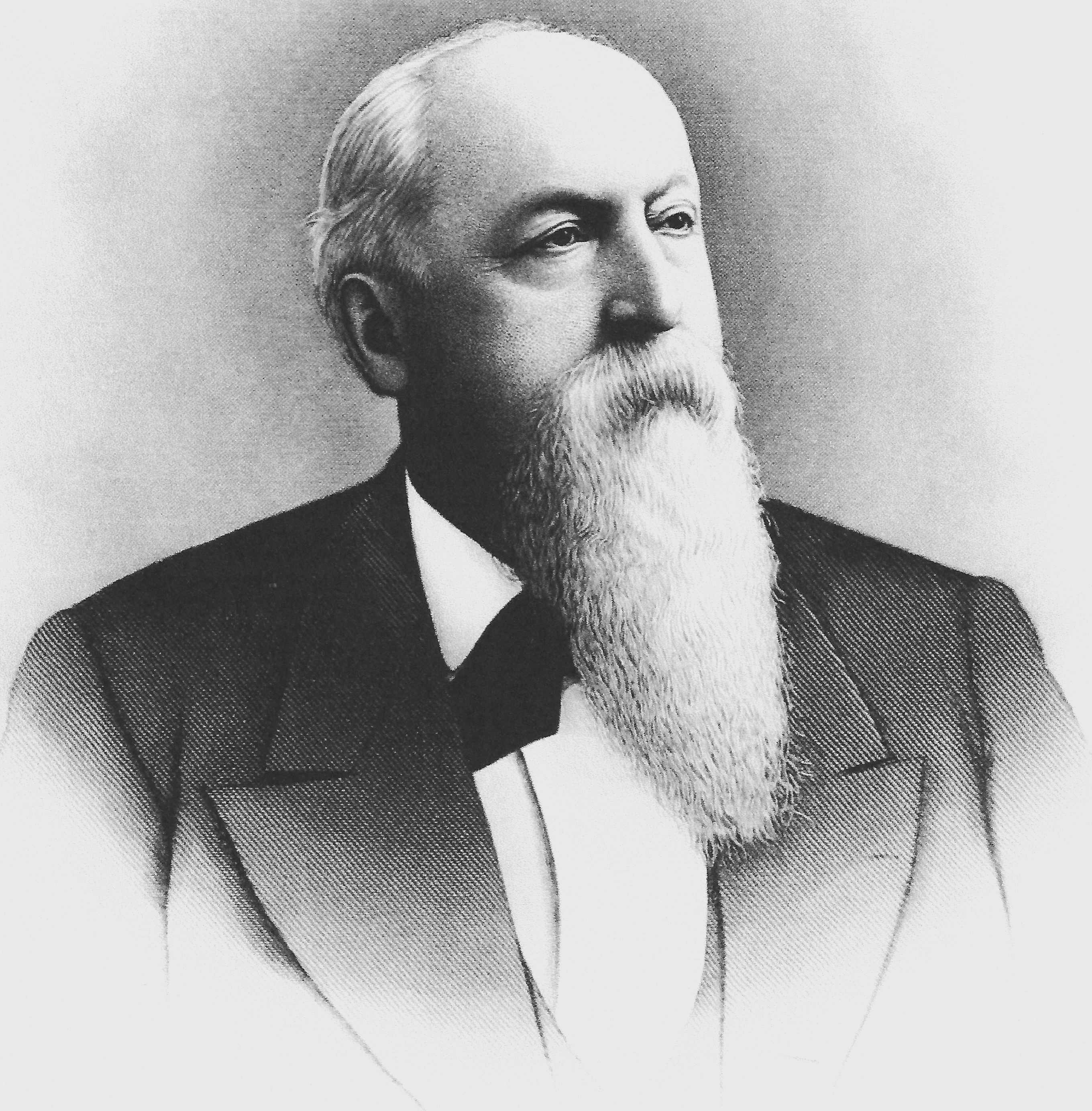
- Born: November 5, 1829; Deiderfeld, Rheinfalz, Germany
- Died: October 19, 1894 (aged 64); Portland, Oregon, United States
- Resting place: Lone Fir Cemetery; 45°31′05″N 122°38′31″W
- Education: "one winter in a log schoolhouse"
- Occupations: Merchant, investor, builder, and banker
- Spouse(s): Fanny Reinig, Phoebe M. Humason
- Children: 8 - Edward (b1860), Lizzie (b1861), Otto (b1863), Adolph (b1866), George (b1867), Rosina (b1870), Clara (b1872), Frank (b1877)

Frank Dekum (November 5, 1829 – October 19, 1894) was a prominent 19th century fruit merchant, banker, and real-estate investor in Portland, Oregon. Born in Germany, Dekum emigrated to the north-central U.S. with his family and as a young man went west in search of gold before starting a successful fresh-fruit business in Portland. Prospering as a merchant, Dekum invested in real-estate, banking, and an early railroad, was a president or board member of many of the city's companies, and was one of 15 men named to Portland's first municipal water committee.

Dekum involved himself in many building projects in downtown Portland. One of his structures, the Dekum Building, which served as headquarters for the city's government in the 1890s, was listed on the National Register of Historic Places in 1980. The Portland and Vancouver Railway, financed partly by Dekum, ran along the east side of the Willamette River from East Portland to the Columbia River. Dekum Street in northeast Portland is named after him. Dekum was the president of the German Song Bird Society, which imported to Oregon many German songbirds. After suffering great financial loss during the Panic of 1893, he died in 1894.

== Early life ==
Dekum was born in Deiderfeld, Rheinfalz, Germany, on November 5, 1829. He and his brother and four sisters emigrated to the United States to settle on a farm near Belleville, Illinois. The family later moved to St. Louis, Missouri, where both parents died. After serving as an apprentice confectioner in St. Louis, Dekum and a friend, Frederick Bickel, went gold prospecting in California and Idaho before settling in Portland.

== From fruit to real estate ==
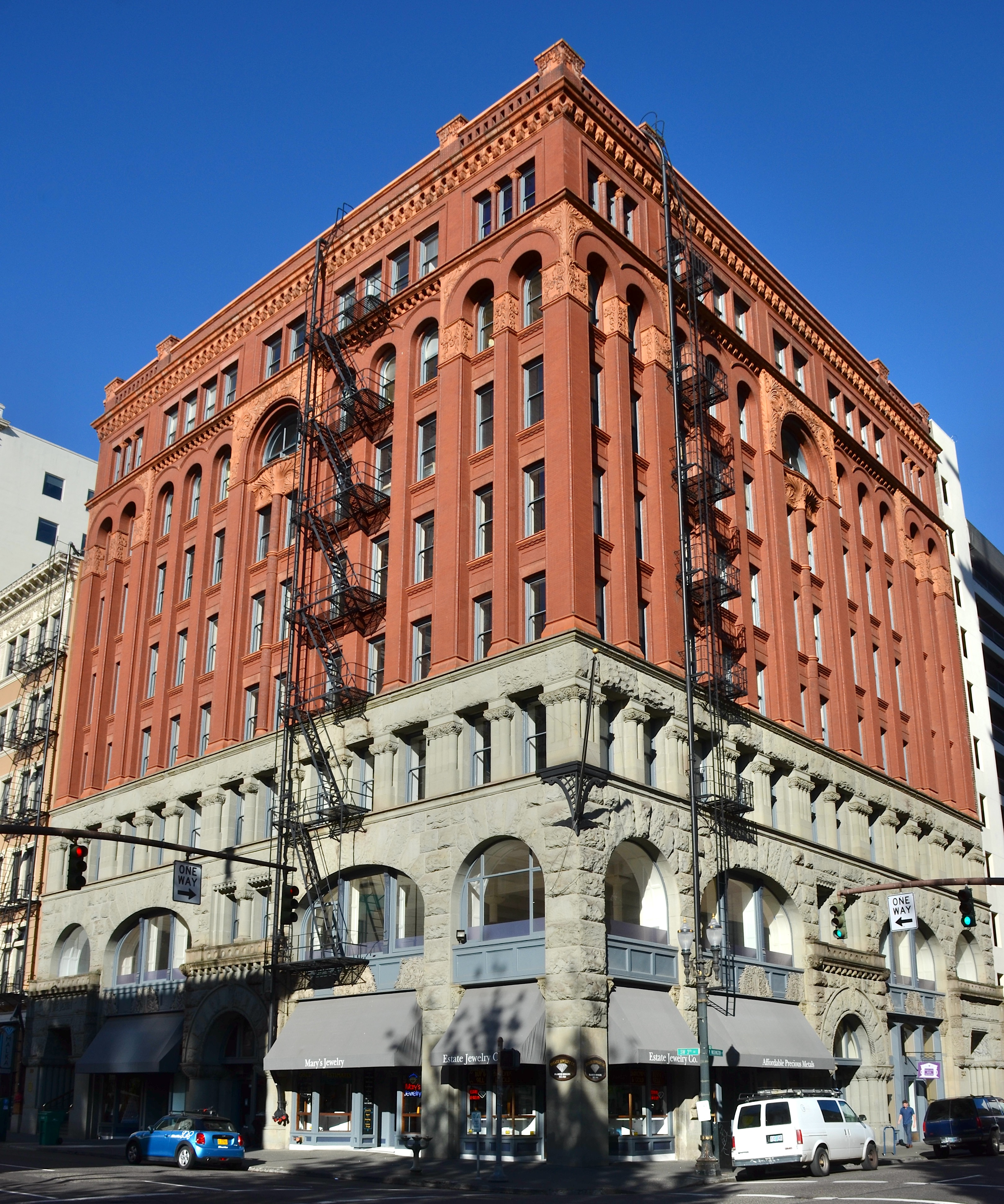
Dekum Building in 2019

In 1853, the two men established a fruit and confectionery store, Dekum & Bickel, which prospered for the next quarter-century in downtown Portland. Amassing wealth from the "largest wholesale fresh-fruit business in the Northwest", Dekum joined "the frenzied real-estate speculations of the early 1860s", and his large holdings included several buildings that bore his name. In 1875, he and Simeon Reed financed the city's most expensive building of the time; it was known as the Dekum and Reed Block.

Portland historian Joseph Gaston wrote, "It is an interesting and noteworthy fact that he was connected with the construction of every building in whole or in part between First and Third on Washington street... ". These projects included the first large brick building on Front Street, the Gadsby and Commercial blocks, the Waldo Building, and in 1892 the Dekum Building.

The latter, at the southwest corner of Southwest Third Avenue and Washington Street, is eight stories high, was built entirely of Oregon materials, and cost $300,000 in 1892 dollars. The first three stories of the Romanesque structure are of rough-cut sandstone; the top five floors are of red brick and unglazed terracotta with floral designs. Decorative machicolations (openings of the sort used in earlier eras for pouring pitch and dropping rocks on attackers) appear in the parapet at the top of the building. For eight years starting in 1893 Portland's government was headquartered in this structure, temporarily dubbed the Council Building. The exterior was renovated in 1987, and the interior opened to the nearby Hamilton Building in the 1990s. The Dekum Building was added to the National Register of Historic Places in 1980 and is part of the Skidmore/Old Town Historic District.

== Banks, companies ==
In 1880 Dekum helped establish the Portland Savings Bank, of which he was named president in 1886, succeeding David P. Thompson. He helped organize the Commercial National Bank of Portland and served as its president. (The two banks occupied the same building and had overlapping directors, including John McCraken, George H. Williams, and Cyrus A. Dolph, as well as Dekum and Thompson.) He was at various times president of Columbia Investment Company, Oregon Land and Investment Company, Columbia Fire and Marine Insurance Company, Portland and Vancouver Railway Company, Trinidad Asphalt & Paving Company, and the Portland Exposition Company. In 1885, Dekum was one of 15 men named to the Portland Water Committee, empowered by the Oregon Legislative Assembly to acquire and operate a municipal water system for the city.

== Portland and Vancouver Railway ==
In 1888 Dekum, Richard L. Durham, and John B. David built a narrow gauge railway, the Portland and Vancouver Railway, that began in what was then the separate city of East Portland and went north through the then-separate city of Albina on the way to the Columbia River. The south end of the steam railway was at the east end of the Stark Street ferry between Portland and East Portland on the Willamette River. The north end of the line was at a landing on the Columbia that served ferries traveling between Oregon and Vancouver, Washington.

Dekum and Durham, through their Oregon Land and Development Company, invested in developing the Woodlawn District, which was near the railroad in Albina. Most of the railway route ran initially through "virgin timber and scattered clearings", especially north of Albina, where "the country was quite primitive until the broad bottomlands of the Columbia were reached." Because the land near the river was subject to annual flooding, the northernmost 8,000 feet (2,400 m) of the line was elevated on trestles. In 1892 the line was sold to the Portland Consolidated Street Railway Company, which switched to a bigger gauge to match its other tracks and began to electrify the railway for trolleys.

== Family, other interests ==
Dekum was married in 1859 to Fanny Reinig of St. Louis, with whom he had eight children. In Portland, they lived in a three-story house, built in about 1864, on a tract later defined by Northwest 13th and 14th avenues and Morrison and Yamhill streets, that was at the time well outside the city. (Note: Central Portland lies on the west side of a bend in the north-flowing Willamette River. With few exceptions, its north–south streets (called avenues in the 21st century) are numbered in ascending order beginning west of Front Street (later named Naito Parkway), which runs along the river. The Dekum residence was roughly 14 blocks west of the river.) The house featured staggered quoins at its corners, a three-bay entrance porch, segmental arched windows, and a conservatory (sun room) on the south. Fanny died in 1877. In 1881, Dekum married Phoebe M. Humason (1840–1920). Phoebe was the widow of Orlando Humason.

President of the German Song Bird Society, Dekum contributed money to import German song birds, including thrushes, starlings, and nightingales, to Oregon. According to one report, the society brought a total of about 500 German birds to Oregon at various times and released many of them into the wild, mainly in Portland parks. Although birds from these early importations survived for years by some accounts, they all eventually disappeared. Dekum was also president of the German Aid Society of Portland.

== Death and legacy ==
During the Panic of 1893, when many banks failed, Dekum's Portland Savings Bank barely survived. Portland historian E. Kimbark MacColl writes that among Portland bankers

the banker who suffered the heaviest loss was Frank Dekum, who died in 1894, partially from the strain of the depression. With David P. Thompson's help, he had managed to salvage enough out of the wreckage of the Portland Savings Bank to leave an estate of over $1 million, largely in downtown real estate; his railway holdings had collapsed. Thompson, who had been president of the savings bank from 1880 to 1886, had sold all his bank stocks before his appointment in 1891 as American Minister to Turkey. Upon his return in 1893, he was appointed receiver for the bank. (Note: In 1910, long after Dekum's death, Oregon Governor Jay Bowerman charged Thompson, Dekum and Jonathan Bourne, Jr., with fraud, claiming that the Portland Savings Bank had been looted and hundreds made destitute. The bank, he said, had inflated its assets and made risky commercial loans with savings deposits. The bank had reopened in May 1894 but closed in October. According to MacColl, "Bowerman accused Thompson of reopening the bank just long enough for Thompson to bail out his favored creditors... ".)

Wells Fargo bought Dekum's other bank, Commercial National Bank of Portland, in January 1894. Dekum died on October 19 that year and was buried in Lone Fir Cemetery in southeast Portland.

Northeast Dekum Street in Portland is named after him.

== Sources ==
- Gaston, Joseph (1911). Portland, Oregon, its history and builders: in connection with the Antecedent Explorations, Discoveries, and Movements of the Pioneers That Selected the Site for the Great City of the Pacific. Vol. 2. Chicago: S.J. Clarke Publishing Company. OCLC 1183569.
- Hawkins, William J. III; Willingham, William F. (1999). Classic Houses of Portland, Oregon: 1850–1950. Portland, Oregon: Timber Press. ISBN 0-88192-433-4.
- King, Bart (2007). An Architectural Guidebook to Portland (2nd ed.). Corvallis: Oregon State University Press. ISBN 978-0-87071-191-6.
- Labbe, John T. (1982). Fares, Please! Those Portland Trolley Years. Caldwell, Idaho: The Caxton Printers, Ltd. ISBN 0-87004-278-5.
- Lansing, Jewel (2005) [2003]. Portland: People, Politics, and Power, 1851–2001. Corvallis: Oregon State University Press. ISBN 0-87071-559-3.
- MacColl, E. Kimbark; Stein, Harry H. (1988). Merchants, Money, and Power: The Portland Establishment 1843–1913. Portland, Oregon: The Georgian Press. ISBN 0-9603408-4-X.
- MacColl, E. Kimbark (1976). The Shaping of a City: Business and Politics in Portland, Oregon, 1885 to 1915. Portland, Oregon: The Georgian Press. OCLC 2645815.
- Portland Bureau of Planning (1993). "Portland's Adopted Woodlawn Neighborhood Plan" (PDF). City of Portland – via University of Oregon.
- Scott, Harvey Whitefield (1890). History of Portland, with Illustrations and Biographical Sketches of Prominent Citizens and Pioneers. Syracuse, New York: D. Mason and Co. OCLC 4342776 – via Internet Archive.
