= East India Co. Grill and Bar =

Indian restaurant in Portland, Oregon, U.S.

- Interactive map of East India Co. Grill and Bar

Restaurant information
- Established: December 2007
- Food type: Indian
- Location: 821 Southwest 11th Avenue, Portland, Multnomah, Oregon, 97205, United States
- Coordinates: 45.5193°N 122.6839°W
- Website: eicpdx.com

East India Co. Grill and Bar is an Indian restaurant in Portland, Oregon.

== Description ==
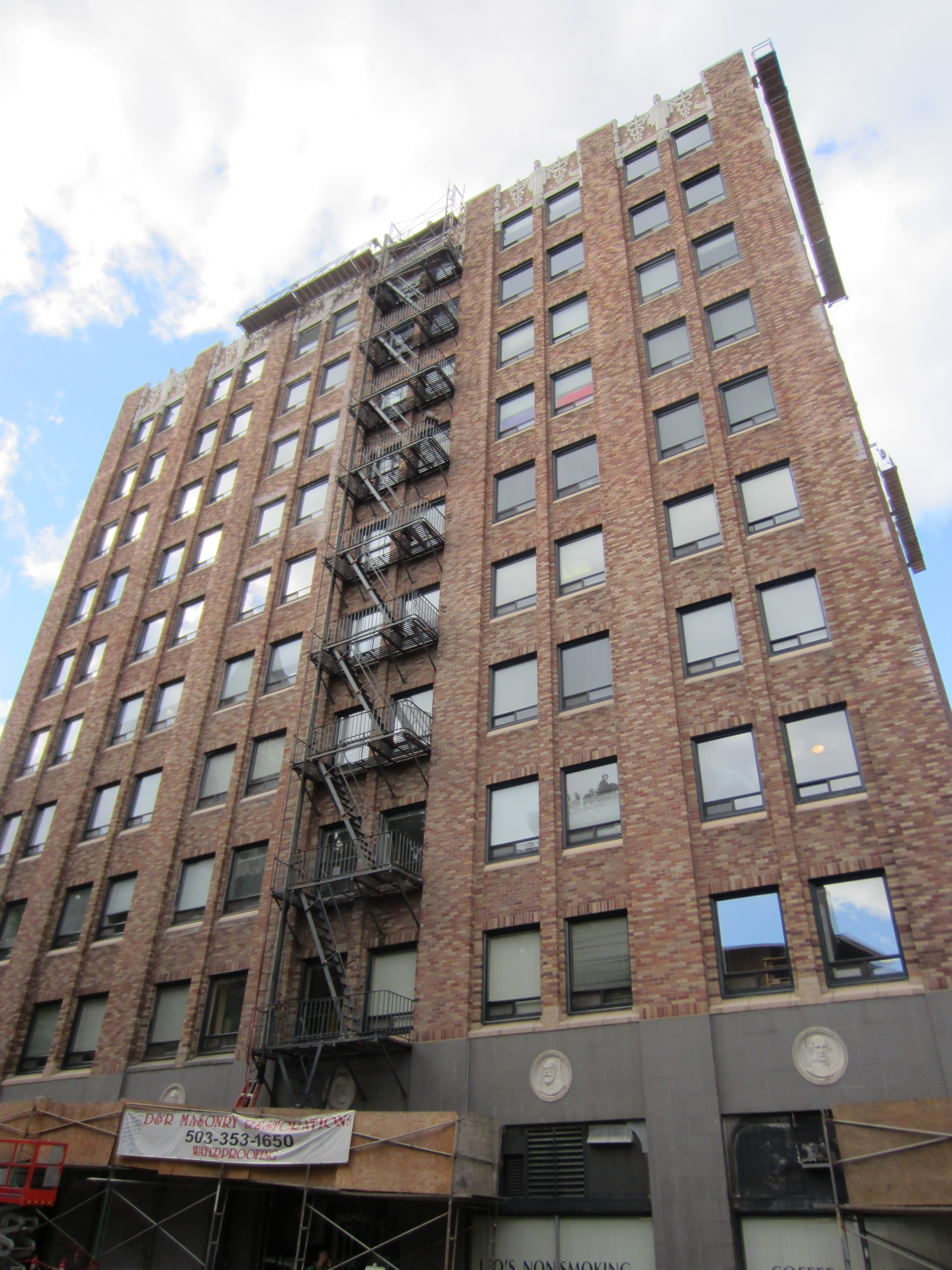
The restaurant is housed in the Medical Dental Building (pictured in 2012)

The restaurant is housed in downtown Portland's Medical Dental Building. The menu includes gosht vindaloo, murg makhani, navratan korma, and saag paneer.

== History ==
Owners and spouses Anita and Prakash Reddy opened the restaurant in 2007. Pradeep Chandrana was the restaurant's chef and culinary director, as of 2011.

== Reception ==
In 2008, Douglas Perry of The Oregonian gave the restaurant a 'B' rating. Ron Scott and Janey Wong included the restaurant in Eater Portland's 2022 overview of "exceptional" Indian food in the city. Rebecca Roland included East India in Eater Portland's 2025 overview of Portland's best Indian food.

== See also ==
- List of Indian restaurants
