= Sherlock Building =

Historic building in Portland, Oregon, U.S.

- U.S. National Register of Historic Places
- Portland Historic Landmark
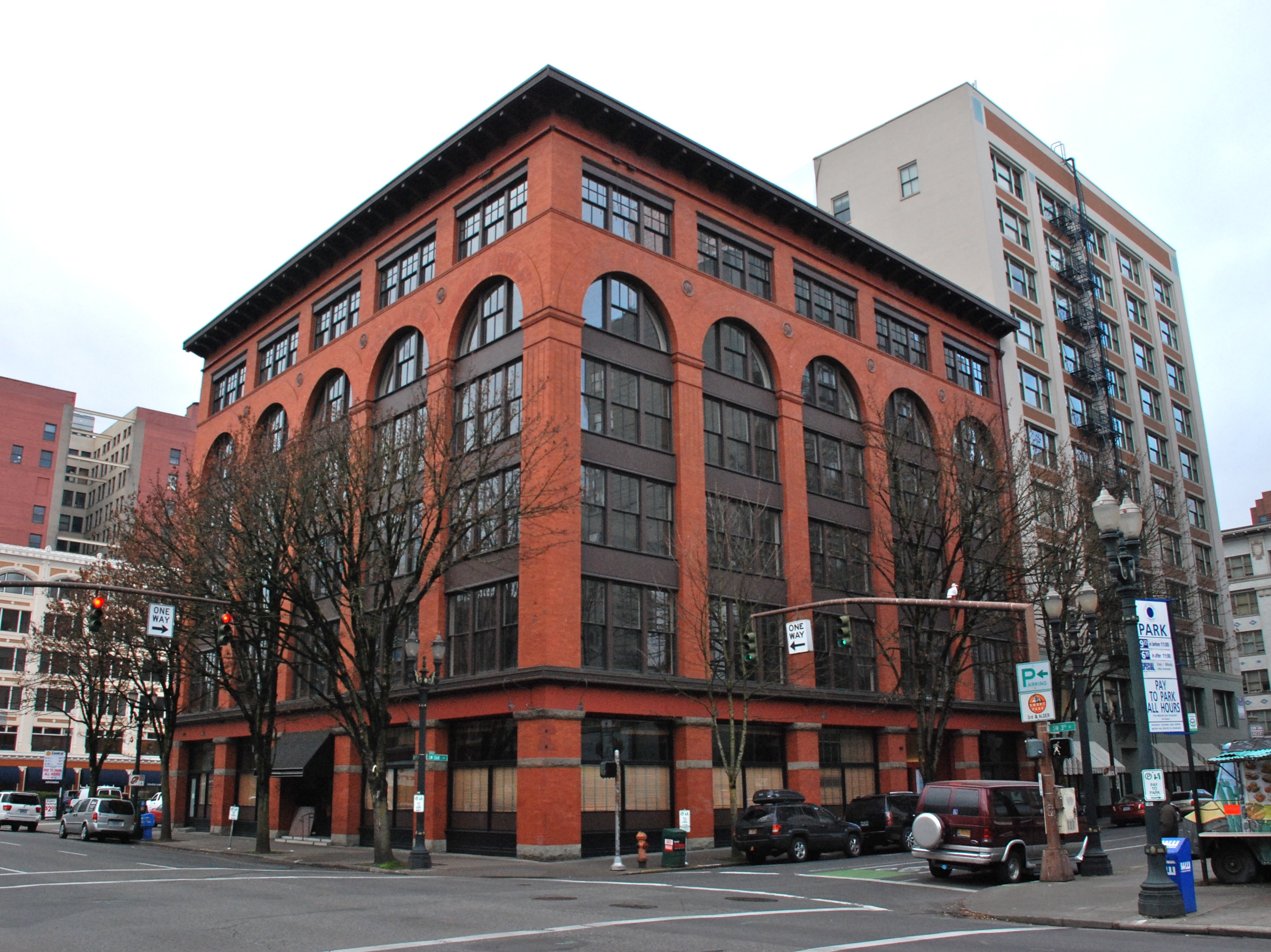
- The Sherlock Building in 2011

- Location within Portland, Oregon Location within Oregon Location within the United States
- Location: 309 SW 3rd Avenue; Portland, Oregon
- Coordinates: 45°31′15″N 122°40′28″W
- Area: 0.2 acres (0.081 ha)
- Built: 1893
- Architect: Isaac Hodgson, Jr., Frederick Manson White
- Architectural style: Late 19th and Early 20th Century American Movements
- NRHP reference No.: 77001111
- Added to NRHP: October 20, 1977

The Sherlock Building, also previously known as the Forbes and Breeden Building, is a building located in downtown Portland, Oregon, listed on the National Register of Historic Places.

In 2010, the Sherlock Building was purchased for $6.8 million by the Church of Scientology, with plans to turn it into the headquarters for its Portland chapter. The Church had previously purchased the nearby Stevens Building, but had decided that it would not be suitable without costly renovations.

== Tenants ==
At the time of the building's purchase in 2010, Ruth's Chris Steak House was a tenant.

== See also ==
- National Register of Historic Places listings in Southwest Portland, Oregon
