= Pazzo Ristorante =

Defunct Italian restaurant in Portland, Oregon, U.S.

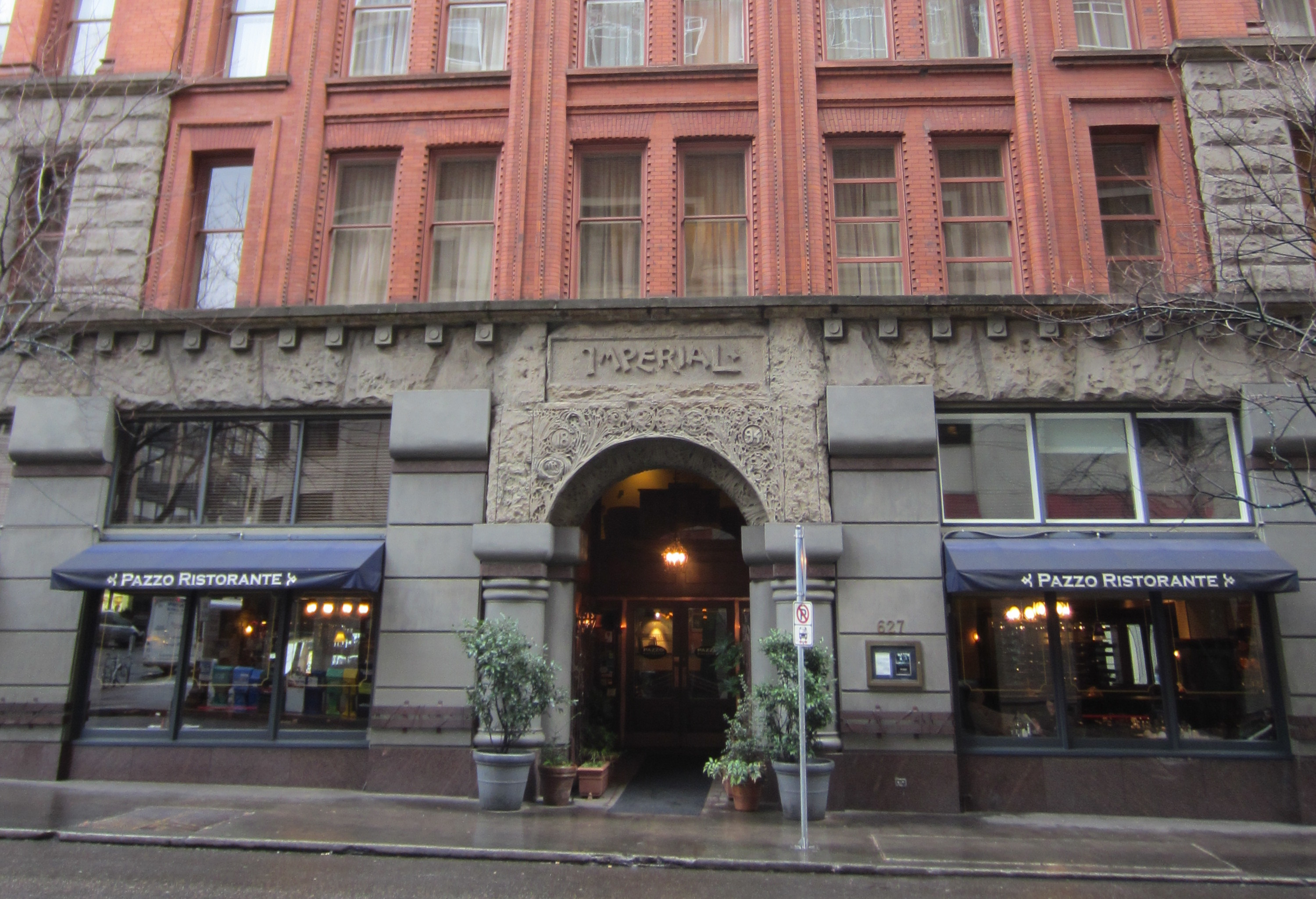
- Exterior of the restaurant in the Hotel Vintage Portland, in 2012
- Interactive map of Pazzo Ristorante

Restaurant information
- Closed: January 1, 2018
- Food type: Italian
- Location: 627 SW Washington Street, Portland, Multnomah, Oregon, 97205, United States
- Coordinates: 45°31′14.6″N 122°40′42.7″W

Pazzo Ristorante, or simply Pazzo, was an Italian restaurant in Portland, Oregon, in the United States.

== Description ==
Pazzo was an Italian restaurant housed in the Kimpton Hotel Vintage Portland in downtown Portland. Elizabeth Dye of Willamette Week said the restaurant had "high-backed" booths, a "gleaming copper-fitted" kitchen, and starched tablecloths, with "expertly prepared Italian classics--generous sprawling salads, toothsome pasta plates, and rich beef and veal entrees".

== History ==
Chef and restaurateur David Machado opened Pazzo. Chefs at the restaurant included Oswaldo Bibiano, Scott Dolich, Kenny Giambalvo, and Vitaly Paley. In 2015, John Eisenhart left to become chef of Nel Centro, after serving as Pazzo's chef for eleven years.

Pazzo was later owned by Heathman Group, along with the Hotel Vintage Plaza.

The restaurant closed after brunch on January 1, 2018, with plans to be replaced by a restaurant with a New York–style Italian menu after a months-long renovation. Following the $3 million renovation, the restaurant was replaced by Il Solito in May 2018.

== Reception ==
Portland Monthly described the food as "refreshingly sharp". Julie Lee included Pazzo in 1859's 2016 overview of the city's best Italian restaurants, in which she described Pazzo as "a time-honored anchor in the epicenter of downtown Portland, serving the lunchtime business community and romantics seeking an elegant evening out for the past two decades". She wrote, "Everything spun out of the open kitchen is wicked delicious; some favorites include the Strozzapreti, with Dungeness crab and Calabrian peppers, and the mushroom and black truffle pizza with an organic egg topping."

== See also ==
- List of Italian restaurants
