= Woodrow Wilson Junior High School (Eugene, Oregon) =

- U.S. National Register of Historic Places
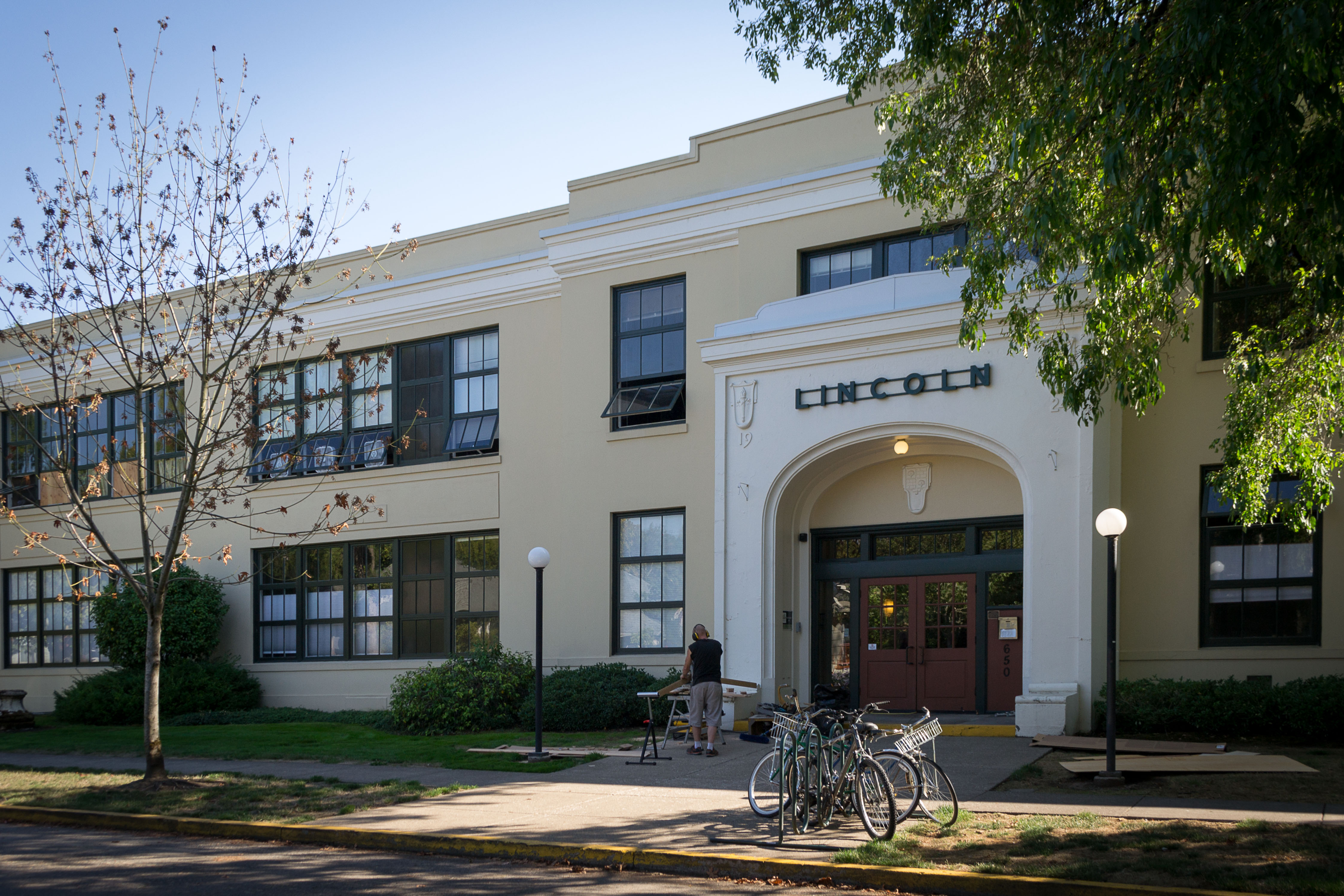
- Lincoln School Condominiums

- Location within Oregon Location within the United States
- Location: 650 W 12th Ave, Eugene, Oregon
- Coordinates: 44°2′47″N 123°6′4″W
- Area: 1.7 acres (0.69 ha)
- Built: 1924
- Architect: White, F. Mason
- Architectural style: Classical Revival
- NRHP reference No.: 90001602
- Added to NRHP: October 25, 1990

Woodrow Wilson Junior High School, located in Eugene, Oregon, United States, is listed on the National Register of Historic Places. The school was constructed in 1924 on four acres at 650 West 12th Avenue near Jefferson Street for the Eugene Public School System.

== History ==
Architect Frederick Manson White of Portland designed the 57,120 square-foot building to accommodate 840 students. White also designed the other school built that year in Eugene, Roosevelt Junior High (now Agate Hall, part of the University of Oregon) on Agate Street. After it opened in September 1925, Wilson became a central part of middle school education in western Eugene. In 1953, the Wilson school was converted to an elementary school and renamed Lincoln Elementary School. Aspects of the building were altered to accommodate smaller students, such as lowered blackboards and bathroom fixtures. The original twenty classrooms were reduced to fourteen, creating larger interior spaces that included administrative offices. The library was made smaller, and a storeroom and kitchen were added. After the school was closed and vacated by the school district in 1987, the building was repurposed as the Lincoln School Condominiums.

== See also ==
- National Register of Historic Places listings in Lane County, Oregon
