= Blueplate Lunch Counter and Soda Fountain =

Defunct restaurant in Portland, Oregon, U.S.

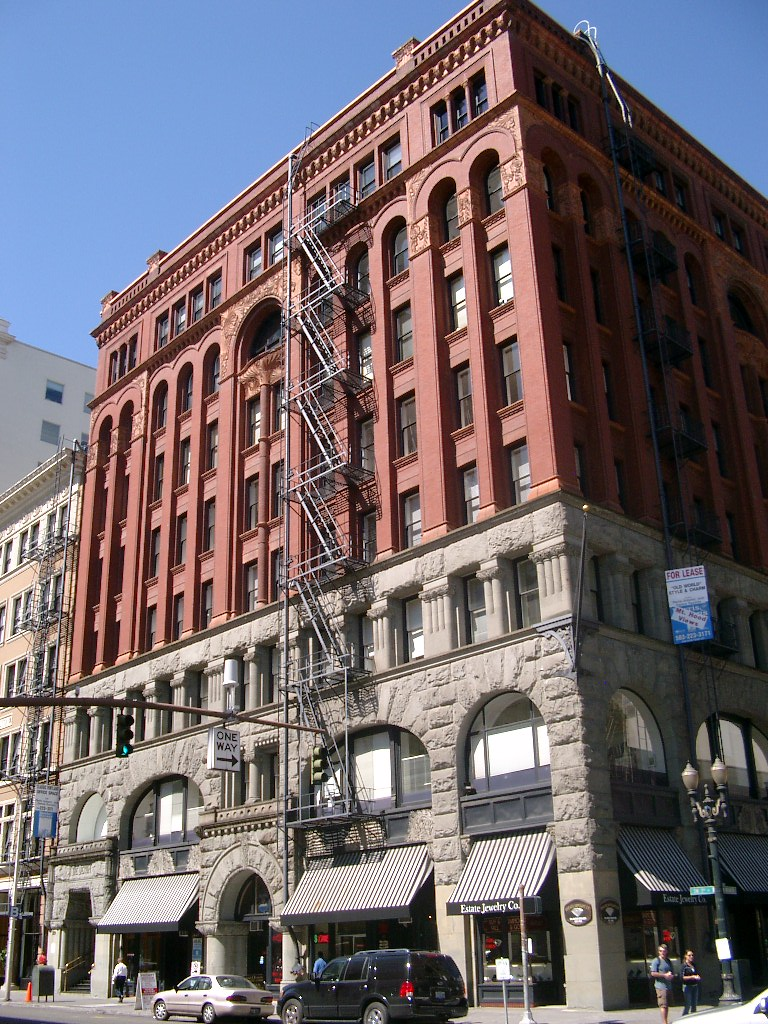
- The restaurant was housed in downtown Portland's Dekum Building (pictured in 2007)
- Interactive map of Blueplate Lunch Counter and Soda Fountain

Restaurant information
- Established: 2006
- Closed: 2016
- Owner: Jeff Reiter
- Chef: Jeff Reiter
- Food type: American
- Location: 308 Southwest Washington Street, Portland, Multnomah, Oregon, 97204, United States
- Coordinates: 45.5200°N 122.6753°W

Blueplate Lunch Counter and Soda Fountain was a restaurant in Portland, Oregon, United States. Located in downtown's Dekum Building, the diner and lunch counter was established by chef–owner Jeff Reiter in 2006. The menu had American-style comfort food such as chicken and dumplings, French toast, meatloaf, and hot dogs, as well as banana splits, egg creams, milkshakes, and sundaes.

Blueplate was one of the city's only in-house soda fountains, offering classic and original varieties. Guy Fieri visited for a 2012 episode of the Food Network's Diners, Drive-Ins and Dives. The restaurant garnered a positive reception, especially for its sodas, burger sliders, macaroni and cheese, and grilled cheese and tomato soup combination, which Fieri said was among the nation's best. Blueplate closed in 2016, after operating for nine years.

== Description ==
Blueplate was a lunch counter and soda fountain at the intersection of Third Avenue and Washington Street, in downtown Portland's Dekum Building. Karen Brooks of The Oregonian called the restaurant a "tiny, adorable outpost of apothecary chic", and described an "old-fashioned" counter with swivel stools and shelves stocking powders, "potions" and other "mysterious" liquids. Similarly, the newspaper's Roger Porter said Blueplate looked "like a combination old-timey lunch counter, soda fountain and apothecary from the '40s", with lollipops placed on each of the six tables, a row of green stools, a tall wooden cabinet with decorative flagons and "fluorescent-colored" liquids, and a counter with jars of chewing gum and hard candy.

Willamette Week's Mike Thelin called the restaurant an "old-school" diner. The newspaper also said, "Blueplate forgoes the typical cheesy retro-diner decor (there isn't enough room inside to pull it off, anyway), allowing the nostalgia to originate in the taste buds." The interior had a gold-molded archway, decorative columns, wood furnishings and wainscot panelling, walls with earth tones, and penny candy by the register. Julia Moskin of The New York Times called Blueplate "a soda fountain updated for the modern century". Leah Rendon of USA Today said Blueplate was "child-friendly".

=== Menu ===
The menu had American-style comfort food such as burger sliders, French toast, hot dogs, macaroni and cheese with bacon and mushroom, and pulled pork sandwiches, as well as ice cream floats with house-made sodas. The restaurant also served brisket pot roast, roasted chicken with mushrooms and buttered noodles, meatloaf, Caesar salad, and chicken and dumplings. The meatloaf sandwich was served with mashed potatoes. When dinner service was added, evening specials included chicken pot pie and chicken-fried steak.

Blueplate was among the city's only in-house soda fountains. The house-made syrups had cane sugar, natural flavors, and "offbeat" ingredients such as lemongrass and kaffir lime. Blueplate had "classics" like chocolate Coke as well as original drinks. The Chai Bomb had cardamom, cloves, ginger, anise, and black pepper, and the Hawaiian Sunset had strawberry soda with pineapple and coconut. The Eastern Connection had orange, ginger, and lemongrass, and the P.R. Nelson had anise, hibiscus, pepper, and cinnamon syrup with huckleberry ice cream. The Painted Desert had honey, pomegranate, and saffron, and the absinthe-inspired Toulouse Lautrec had anise, coriander, and mint.

The diner also sold banana splits, egg creams, milkshakes, sundaes, a peach melba with marshmallow whipped cream, and coffee. Milkshakes were served in "traditional" ribbed glasses and used ice cream from Eugene-based Cascade Glacier; varieties included Chunky Strawberry, Frosted Orange (reminiscent of a creamsicle), and Arctic Chai, which had green tea ice cream and chai syrup. Brooks described the chocolate-filbert milkshake as "deep, thick and pebbled with nutty micro-bits". Blueplate also had seasonal options, including pumpkin pie and candy cane milkshakes.

== History ==
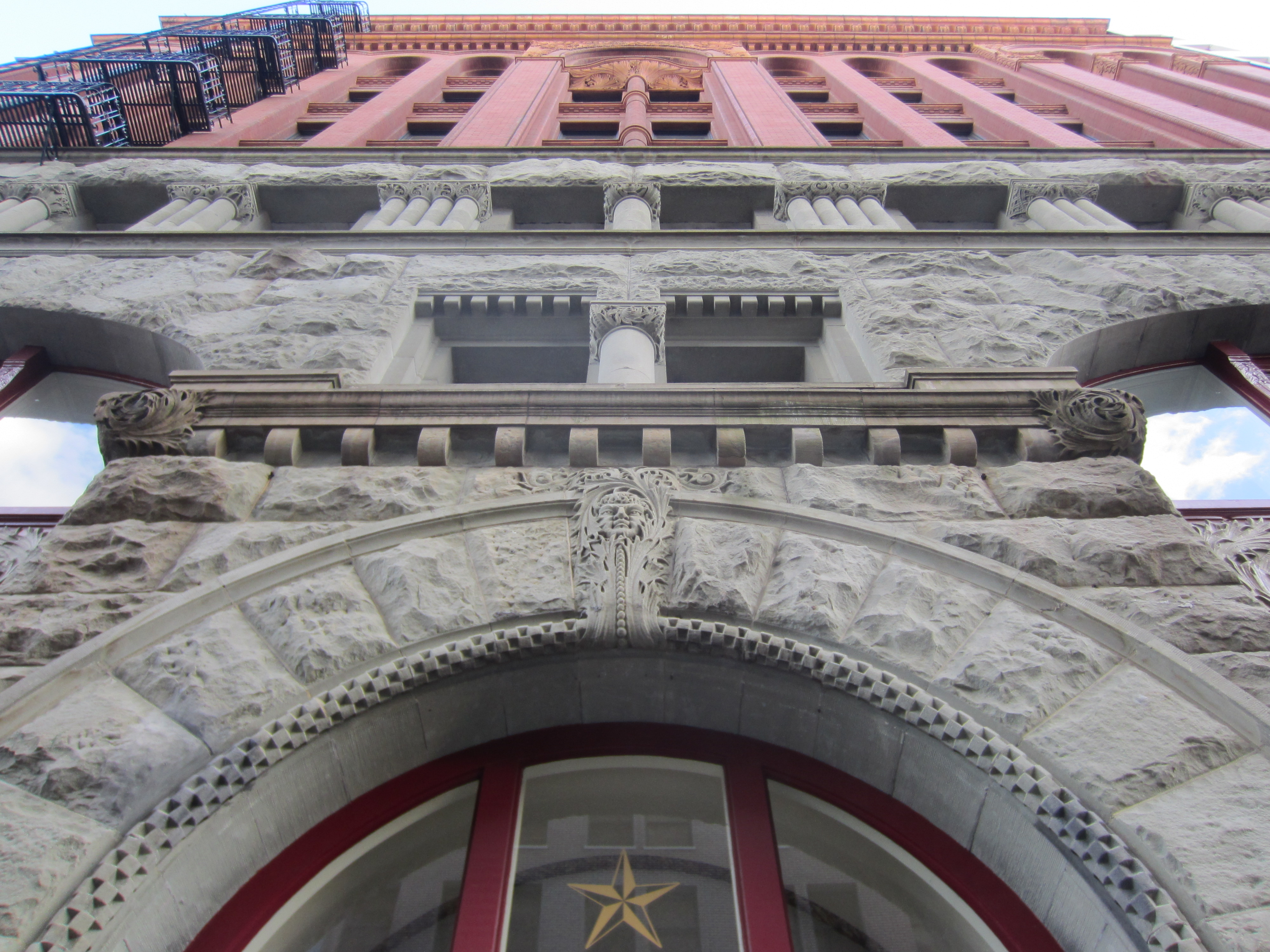
A Southwest Washington Street entrance to the Dekum Building, with Blueplate's star logo on a window, 2012

Jeff Reiter was the chef and owner. In August 2006, Karen Brooks reported on Blueplate's planned opening in September and some of Reiter's menu considerations, including "what must be the world's first honeydew soda served with a strip of bacon". The restaurant was operating by October, initially serving lunch and early dinner (11 am to 5pm) on weekdays. Brooks wrote, "The service is still in shakedown mode, and the big challenge right now seems to be getting food to the table hot from a kitchen that has little more than a couple of hot plates and a holding oven." Supper service was added in 2007.

NPR described how Reiter encouraged political discourse. In 2008, he displayed a sign supporting Barack Obama's presidential campaign. After a customer left a message that read, "You have the greatest food but you support one of the worst presidents ever", Reiter displayed the note on the front window by the menu. He told NPR he did not believe he lost many customers as a result of the display; he stated: "We encourage political discussions. I think we should be talking about these things, and this is a good place to talk about them."

Guy Fieri visited the restaurant for an episode of the Food Network series Diners, Drive-Ins and Dives, which originally aired in 2009. In a 2014 article about drinking straws, Catherine Hollander of Bon Appétit said, "Reiter has considered upgrading from the basic eight-inch, cherry-red food-service fat straw to the more retro-looking—and more expensive—striped waxed-paper straws, but says in an email that keeping the cost of drinks down is the priority for now." Hollander said Blueplate used an average of 100 straws per day at the time. After operating for nine years, Blueplate closed in 2016.

== Reception ==
In 2007, Roger Porter of The Oregonian called Blueplate "the most inspired lunch spot downtown" and wrote: "This ... hole-in-the-wall elicits so much nostalgia that any inhibitions you have about yakking about your youth will disappear faster than you can slurp a strawberry milkshake. If your therapist thinks you've repressed scenes from your early days, just bring the shrink to Blueplate for lunch and your tied tongue will happily wag." He complimented the grilled cheese and tomato soup as well as the macaroni and cheese with Cajun chicken, but said the "less wonderful" meatloaf was served with "lumpy and over-salted" mashed potatoes. Porter opined, "It's a pleasant shock to step from bustling Southwest Washington Street into this realm of retro bliss... The food is as brilliantly unfashionable as the decor, and cooked to perfection."

In 2008, the newspaper complimented the "impressive" results Reiter created in a "modest" kitchen and said the "fabulous" soda fountain options were "the real draw". Cookbook author and restaurant critic Michael Zusman, who reviewed Blueplate for The Oregonian in 2007, considered the restaurant's closure among the "saddest" in Portland in 2016. In 2007, Mike Thelin of Willamette Week said, "Blueplate brings it back, dishing up a slice of yesteryear" in a landmark building." Guy Fieri said Blueplate's grilled cheese and tomato soup was among the best in the U.S. He also complimented the macaroni and cheese and the burger sliders with basil mayonnaise. Writers for Portland Monthly included the sliders as a runner-up in the magazine's 2009 overview of the city's best burgers.

In 2011, Julia Moskin of The New York Times wrote, "Places like Blueplate ... are leading a revival that is bringing up-to-date culinary values — seasonal, house-made, ripe, local — to ice cream sodas, sundaes and egg creams. In the process, they have unearthed forgotten, delicious and possibly risky flavors like sassafras, phosphoric acid and teaberry, and have brought back taste combinations worthy of the most avant-garde chefs." Jess Novak included Blueplate in The Daily Meal's 2014 list of twelve "amazing retro" soda fountains in the United States. In the guide book Moon Portland (2016), Hollyanna McCollom said the peanut butter shake is "so decadent, it's like reliving your childhood in a glass".

== See also ==
- List of diners
- List of Diners, Drive-Ins and Dives episodes
