= Hotel Lucia =

Historic building in Portland, Oregon, U.S.

- New Imperial Hotel
- U.S. National Register of Historic Places
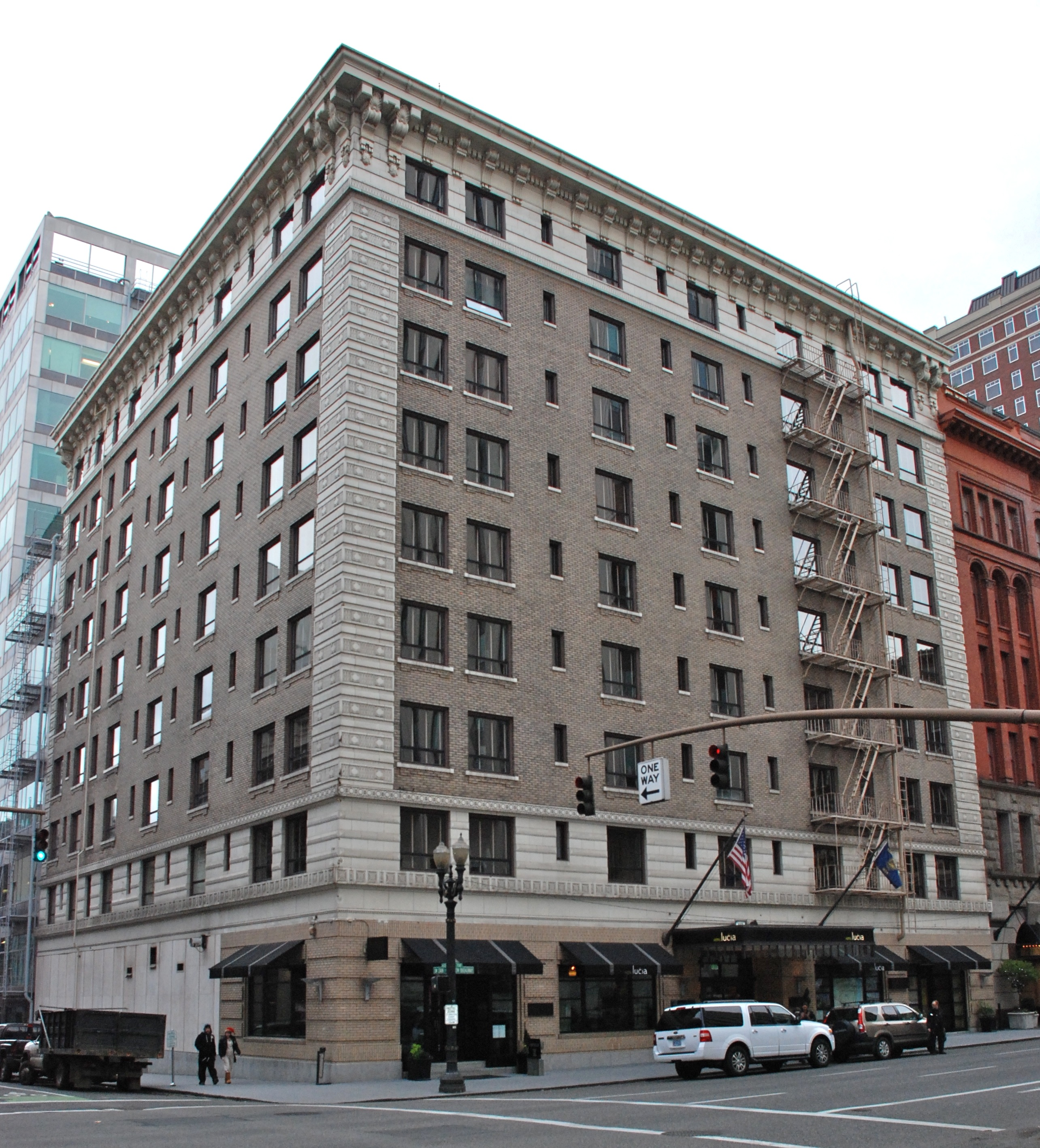
- The Hotel Lucia, former Imperial Hotel, in 2011

- Location within Portland, Oregon
- Location: 400 SW Broadway; Portland, Oregon
- Coordinates: 45°31′16″N 122°40′42″W
- Area: 0.2 acres (0.081 ha)
- Built: 1909
- Architect: Whidden & Lewis
- Architectural style: 20th Century Commercial; Early Commercial
- NRHP reference No.: 03001068
- Added to NRHP: October 24, 2003

The Hotel Lucia, formerly the Imperial Hotel, is a historic hotel building in downtown Portland, Oregon, United States. It was built in 1909 as an extension of the adjacent, original Imperial Hotel. The original Imperial building was made into a separate hotel in 1949, renamed the Plaza Hotel, and after a period of non-hotel use in the 1980s it today operates as the Kimpton Hotel Vintage Portland.

The 1909 building retained its original name until 2002, when the Aspen Hotel Group purchased it, remodeled it as a boutique hotel, and renamed it Hotel Lucia. Between 2012 and 2017, the hotel building housed the Portland Penny Diner.

The building was added to the National Register of Historic Places in 2003, listed as New Imperial Hotel and described as having Early Commercial architecture.

The hotel is operated by Pyramid Global Hospitality .

In June 2025, the hotel became a member of the Small Luxury Hotels of the World (SLH) and with that also joined the Hilton Honors loyalty program as an independent SLH property.

== See also ==
- National Register of Historic Places listings in Southwest Portland, Oregon
