= Flatiron Building (Portland, Oregon) =

Historic building in Portland, Oregon, U.S.

- U.S. National Register of Historic Places
- Portland Historic Landmark
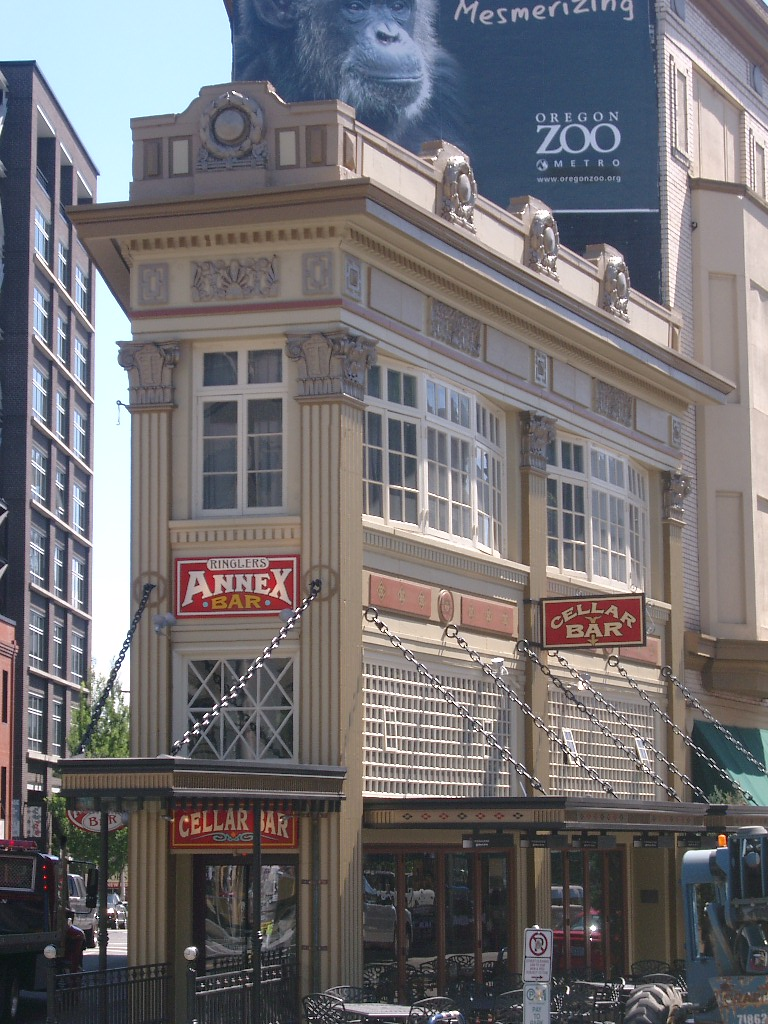
- Viewed from the west in 2007

- Location within Portland, Oregon Location within Oregon Location within the United States
- Location: 1223-1225 SW Stark Street; Portland, Oregon
- Coordinates: 45°31′22″N 122°41′01″W
- Area: less than one acre
- Built: 1916
- Architect: F. Manson White
- Architectural style: Chicago
- NRHP reference No.: 89000200
- Added to NRHP: March 16, 1989

The Flatiron Building, also known as Ringlers Annex and Espresso Bar, is a historic two-story building in downtown Portland, Oregon. Since 1989, it has been listed on the National Register of Historic Places. Previously, it had been designated a Portland Landmark by the city's Historic Landmarks Commission in 1988. This small building has a triangular footprint, as it sits at the end of a triangular lot bounded by West Burnside, SW Stark, and 12th Streets.

From its inception, the building's size has played part in how it has been promoted. When opened, it was said to be the "smallest commercial building on the West Coast". Over its lifespan, the building hosted a catering kitchen and a talk radio station. The current occupant, a McMenamins pub, calls it "a tiny window on the world of bustling West Burnside, complete with a fishbowl-like main floor and a mezzanine tailor-made to observe the city in motion".

== See also ==
- List of buildings named Flatiron Building
- National Register of Historic Places listings in Southwest Portland, Oregon
