= Sweedeedee =

Restaurant in Portland, Oregon, U.S.

- Interactive map of Sweedeedee

Restaurant information
- Established: 2012
- Food type: American
- Location: 5202 North Albina Avenue, Portland, Oregon, 97217, United States
- Coordinates: 45°33′38″N 122°40′29.5″W
- Website: sweedeedee.com

Sweedeedee is a restaurant in Portland, Oregon, United States.

The name of the restaurant refers to the song of the same name, which has been covered by Cat Power.

== Description ==
Sweedeedee is located in north Portland, in the Humboldt neighborhood.

== History ==
The restaurant opened in 2012. Known primarily for brunch, the Sweedeedee began serving dinner in July 2021.

== Reception ==
In 2021, The Oregonian's Michael Russell gave the restaurant a 'B+' rating. He included Sweedeedee in the newspaper's "ultimate guide to Portland's 40 best brunches" in 2019. In 2020, Willamette Week readers named the restaurant a runner-up in the Best Brunch Spot category of the newspaper's annual 'Best of Portland' readers' poll. Portland Monthly included the French toast in a 2022 list of the city's twelve best breakfasts. Writers for Portland Monthly included the corn cakes in a 2025 list of the city's "most iconic" dishes. Sweedeedee was included in Eater Portland's 2025 list of the city's best restaurants for mid-week lunches. Paolo Bicchieri included the business in Eater Portland's 2025 overview of the city's best restaurants for lunch. Sweedeedee was included in Time Out Portland's 2025 list of the city's eighteen best restaurants.
