= Medical Dental Building (Portland, Oregon) =

Building in Portland, Oregon, U.S.

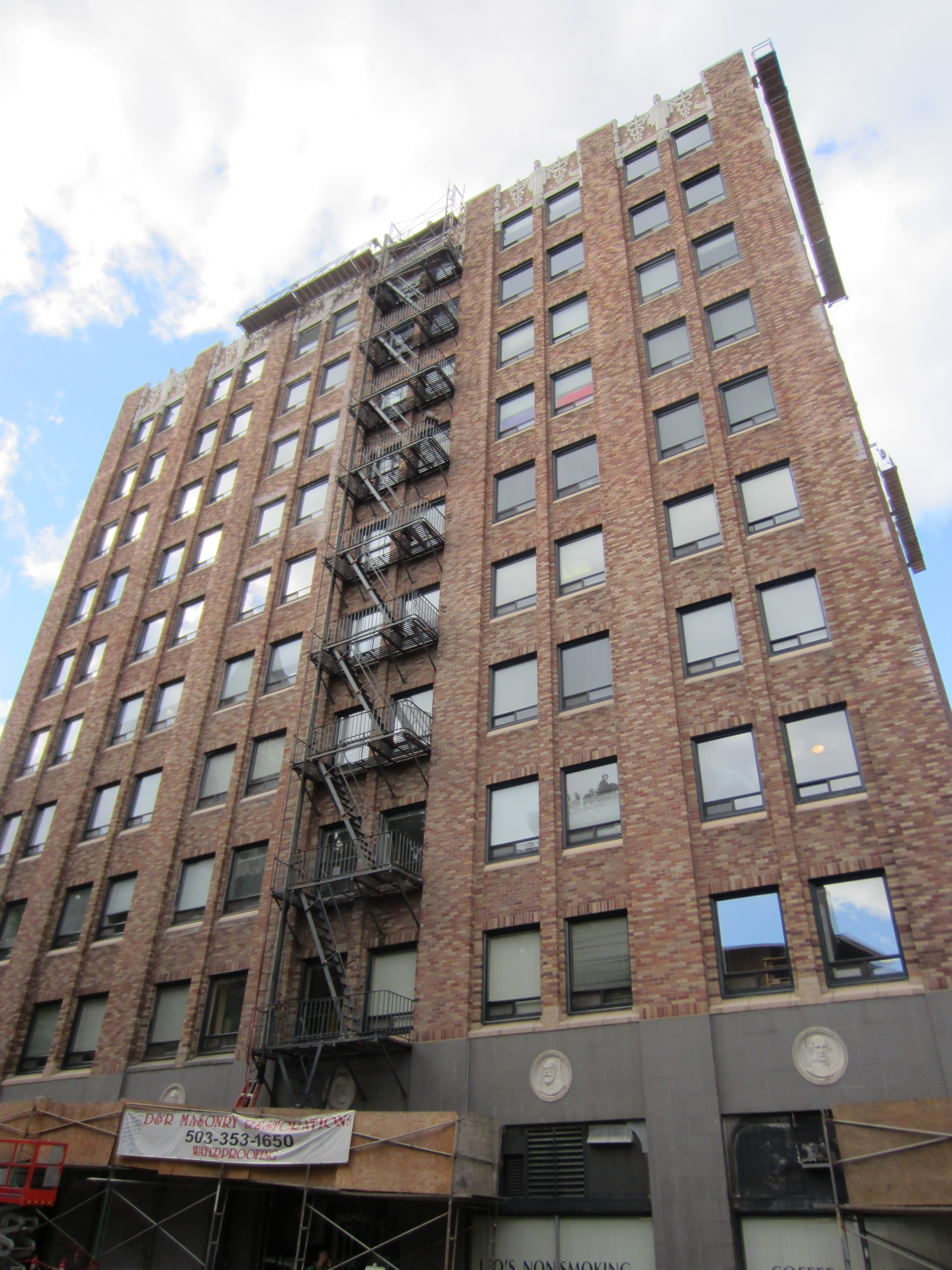
- The building in 2012

- Location within Portland, Oregon

General information
- Location: Portland, Oregon, United States
- Coordinates: 45.51917°N 122.68388°W

The Medical Dental Building is located at 837 Southwest 11th Avenue, in Portland, Oregon, United States. It was designed by Luther Lee Dougan of Houghtaling & Dougan, and completed in 1928.

The building underwent exterior renovations in 2012.

== Tenants ==
The building has housed the restaurants Dime Store and East India Co. Grill and Bar.
