= Dekum Building =

Historic building in Portland, Oregon, U.S.

- The Dekum
- U.S. National Register of Historic Places
- Portland Historic Landmark
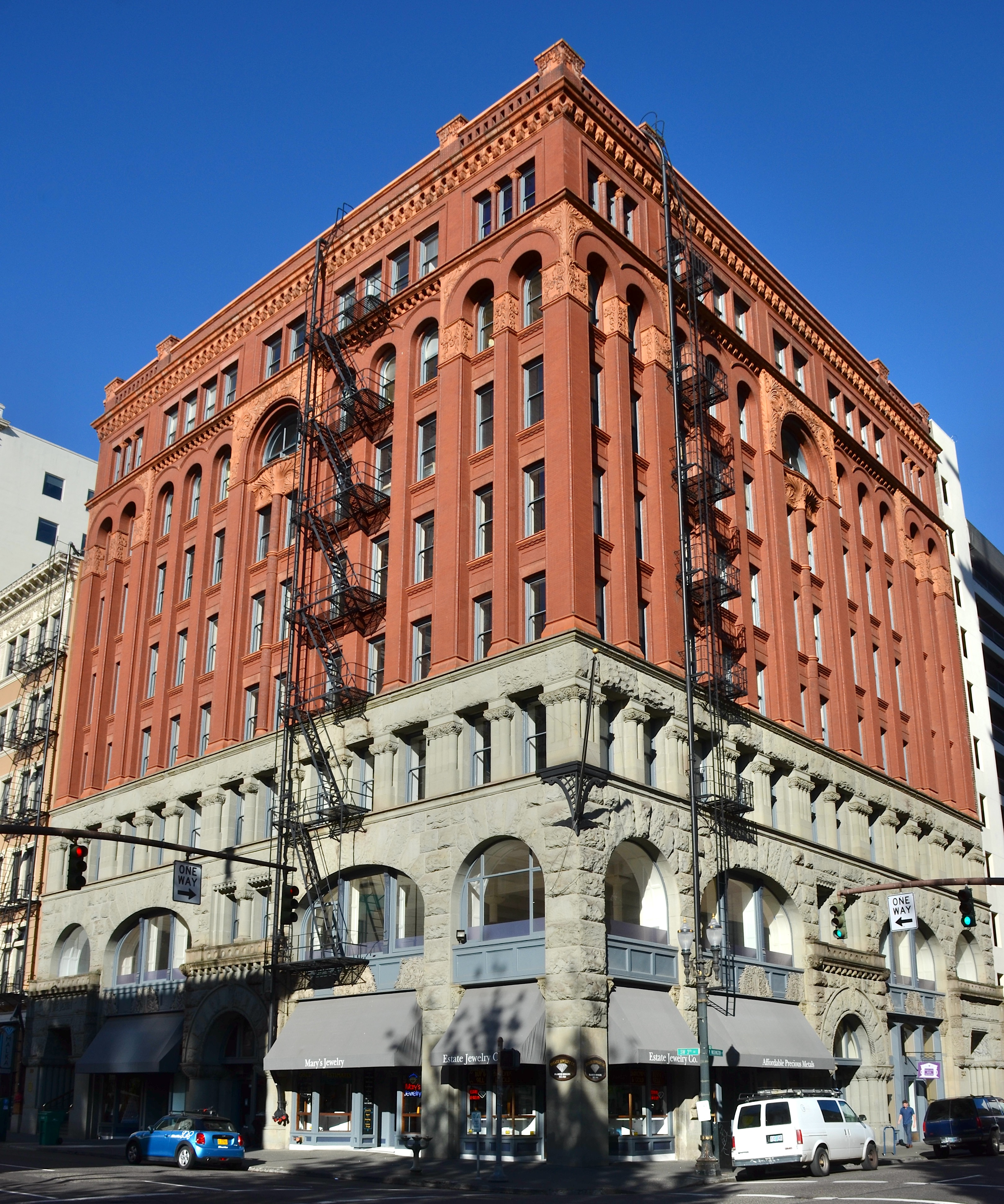
- Viewed from the northeast in 2019

- Location within Portland, Oregon Location within Oregon Location within the United States
- Location: 505–519 SW 3rd Avenue; Portland, Oregon
- Coordinates: 45°31′10″N 122°40′31″W
- Built: 1891–92
- Architect: McCaw, Martin and White
- Architectural style: Romanesque
- NRHP reference No.: 80003363
- Added to NRHP: October 10, 1980

The Dekum or the Dekum Building is a historic office building in downtown Portland, Oregon, United States. It was listed on the National Register of Historic Places in 1980.

With its rusticated sandstone base, over-scaled arches at street level, and stone carvings, the eight-story building is a strong example of Romanesque Revival architecture. It was made completely from materials found in Oregon. Completed in 1892, it is named after Frank Dekum, a German immigrant who opened Portland's first candy shop. Construction cost US$300,000 in 1892, equivalent to $9,300,000 in 2024. During construction, masons reportedly drank beer instead of the usual coffee.

== Notable tenants ==
Former

- Blueplate Lunch Counter and Soda Fountain (2006–2016)
- Wieden+Kennedy

== See also ==
- Architecture of Portland, Oregon
- National Register of Historic Places listings in Southwest Portland, Oregon
- Frederick Manson White of McCaw, Martin and White
