= Portland Penny Diner =

Defunct restaurant in Portland, Oregon, U.S.

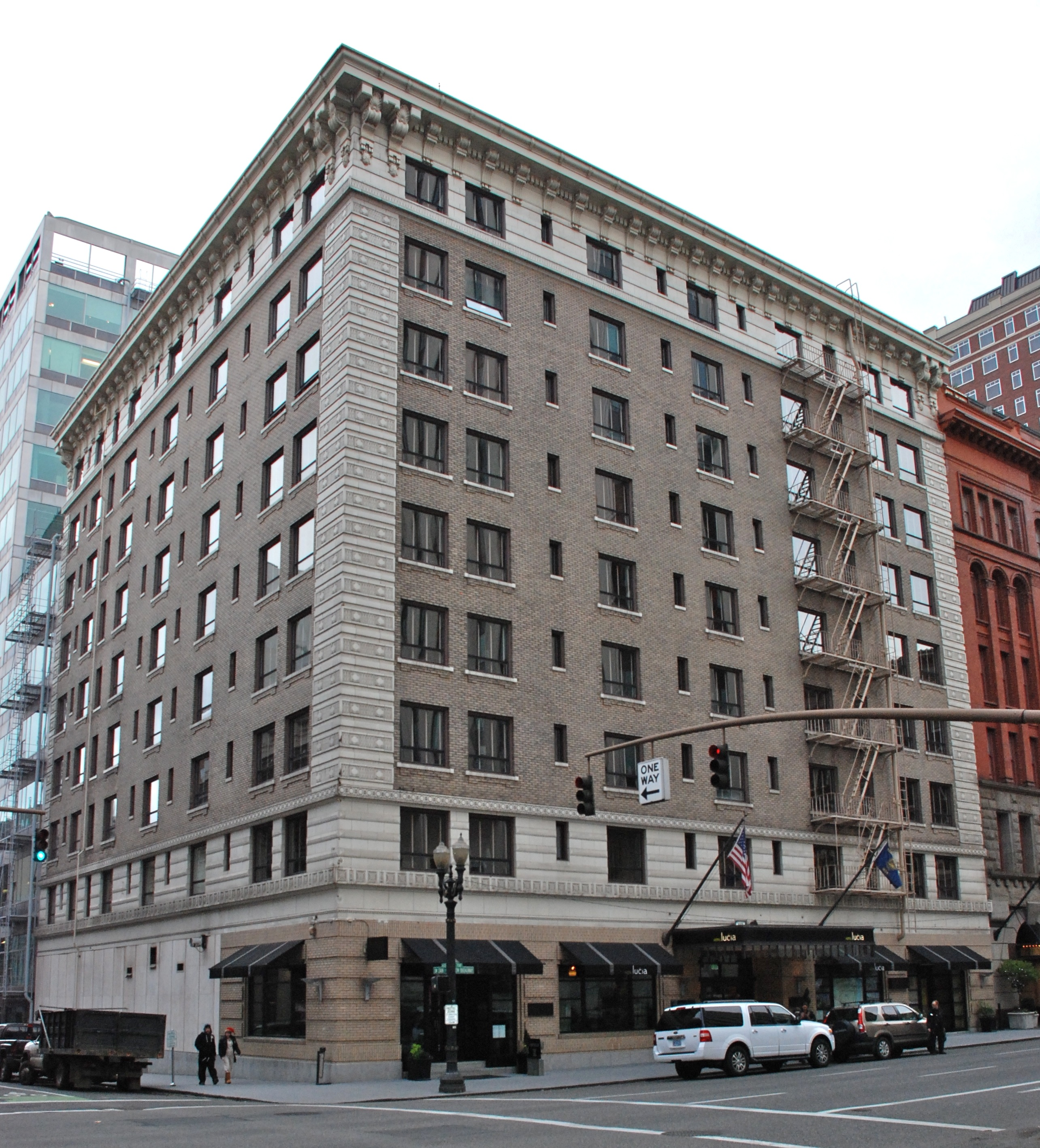
- The diner was housed within Hotel Lucia (pictured in 2011)
- Interactive map of Portland Penny Diner

Restaurant information
- Food type: American
- Location: Portland, Multnomah, Oregon, United States
- Coordinates: 45°31′16.3″N 122°40′42.3″W

Portland Penny Diner was a restaurant in Portland, Oregon's Hotel Lucia, in the United States.

== Description ==
Portland Penny Diner was a counter-service diner at the intersection of Southwest Broadway and Stark Street (since renamed Harvey Milk Street) in downtown Portland, owned by restaurateur Vitaly Paley. Housed within the Hotel Lucia, the exterior had a sign with a spinning penny. In 2016, Willamette Week's Enid Spitz described the restaurant as a "modern, subway-tiled diner" with "pared-down breakfasts for prices cheaper than many food carts". The menu has also been described as "trendy Northwest flavors with a Native American twist". The restaurant has served sandwiches and soups. Fodor's has described the restaurant as "hip and casual".

== History ==
The restaurant opened in November 2012.

The diner closed in May 2017, replaced by Paley's pizza bar and restaurant called The Crown at Imperial.

== Reception ==
Fodor's called the restaurant "excellent".

== See also ==
- List of diners
