= Vitaly Paley =

Chef and restaurateur

- Culinary career
- Previous restaurant
- Paley's Place (1995–2021)

Vitaly Paley is a chef and restaurateur in Portland, Oregon. He won the James Beard Foundation Award for Best Chef: Northwest/Hawaii in 2005, for his work at Paley's Place.

== Early life ==
Paley was born in Russia and raised in New York City.

== Career ==
Vitaly and Kimberly Paley opened Paley's Place in 1995. He won the ninth season of Iron Chef America in 2011, and was later a guest judge on an episode of Top Chef: Portland.

== See also ==
- Heathman Hotel
- James Beard Foundation Award: 2000s
- List of Iron Chef America episodes
- Pazzo Ristorante
- Portland Penny Diner
