= Imperial Hotel (Portland, Oregon) =

Historic building in Portland, Oregon, U.S.

- U.S. National Register of Historic Places
- Portland Historic Landmark
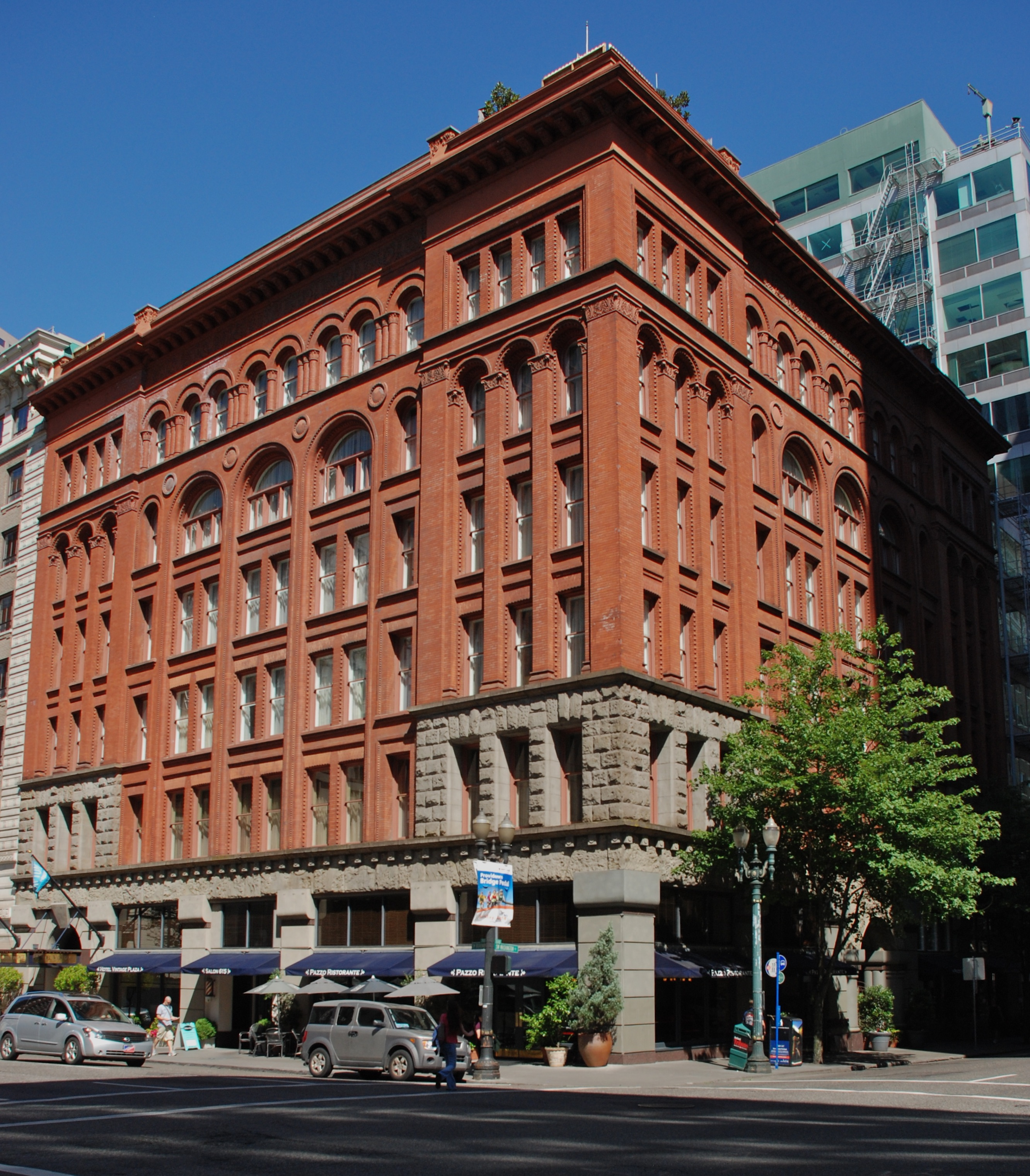
- The Hotel Vintage Portland, on SW Broadway at Washington Street

- Location within Portland, Oregon
- Location: 422–426 SW Broadway; Portland, Oregon
- Coordinates: 45°31′15″N 122°40′42″W
- Area: less than one acre
- Built: 1894
- Architect: Frederick Manson White
- Architectural style: Richardsonian Romanesque
- NRHP reference No.: 85003037
- Added to NRHP: December 2, 1985

The Kimpton Hotel Vintage Portland, historically known as the Imperial Hotel and also as The Plaza Hotel, is a historic hotel building in downtown Portland, Oregon, United States. It was completed in 1894 and was listed on the National Register of Historic Places in 1985 as "Imperial Hotel". Since 2015, the building has been in use as the Kimpton Hotel Vintage Portland, and prior to then it had been known as the Hotel Vintage Plaza since 1991.

== History ==
Construction began in 1892, and the Imperial Hotel opened in March 1894. The building is in the Richardsonian Romanesque architectural style. It has also been known as the Wells Building, after one of its builders, George F. Wells.

In the 1910s, the Imperial's bathrooms were named as popular gay cruising site as the Portland vice scandal hit.

The Pacific Coast Conference was founded at the hotel on December 2, 1915, during the annual meeting of the Northwest Conference schools.

A major expansion was built in 1909 in the form of a separate building, adjacent, known as the New Imperial Hotel. At the end of 1949, the two buildings that had comprised the Imperial were made into separate hotels, when the new building was sold. The original, 1894 building was renamed the Plaza Hotel, while the newer building retained the Imperial name (named the Hotel Lucia since 2002).

A glass false storefront was removed in a renovation done in the 1980s, revealing the structure's lower level stonework. The hotel's former name appears in the stonework above the Washington Street entrance. By at least the early 1980s the building's use as a hotel had ended, although it continued to be commonly referred to as the Plaza Hotel, and was in use as an office building, formally known as Wells Financial Center. However, it suffered from a high vacancy rate, attributed in part to an excess of available office space in downtown Portland.

The building was designated a Portland historical landmark in spring 1985 and was added to the National Register of Historic Places on December 2, 1985.

In 1989, the building was acquired by Kimco Hotel Management (now Kimpton Hotels & Restaurant Group) and remodeled as a boutique hotel. Renamed the Hotel Vintage Plaza, it reopened in May 1991.

The hotel closed for a two-month, $16-million remodeling in early 2015, and when it reopened in mid-March it was renamed the Kimpton Hotel Vintage Portland.

== See also ==
- Pazzo Ristorante

== Gallery ==
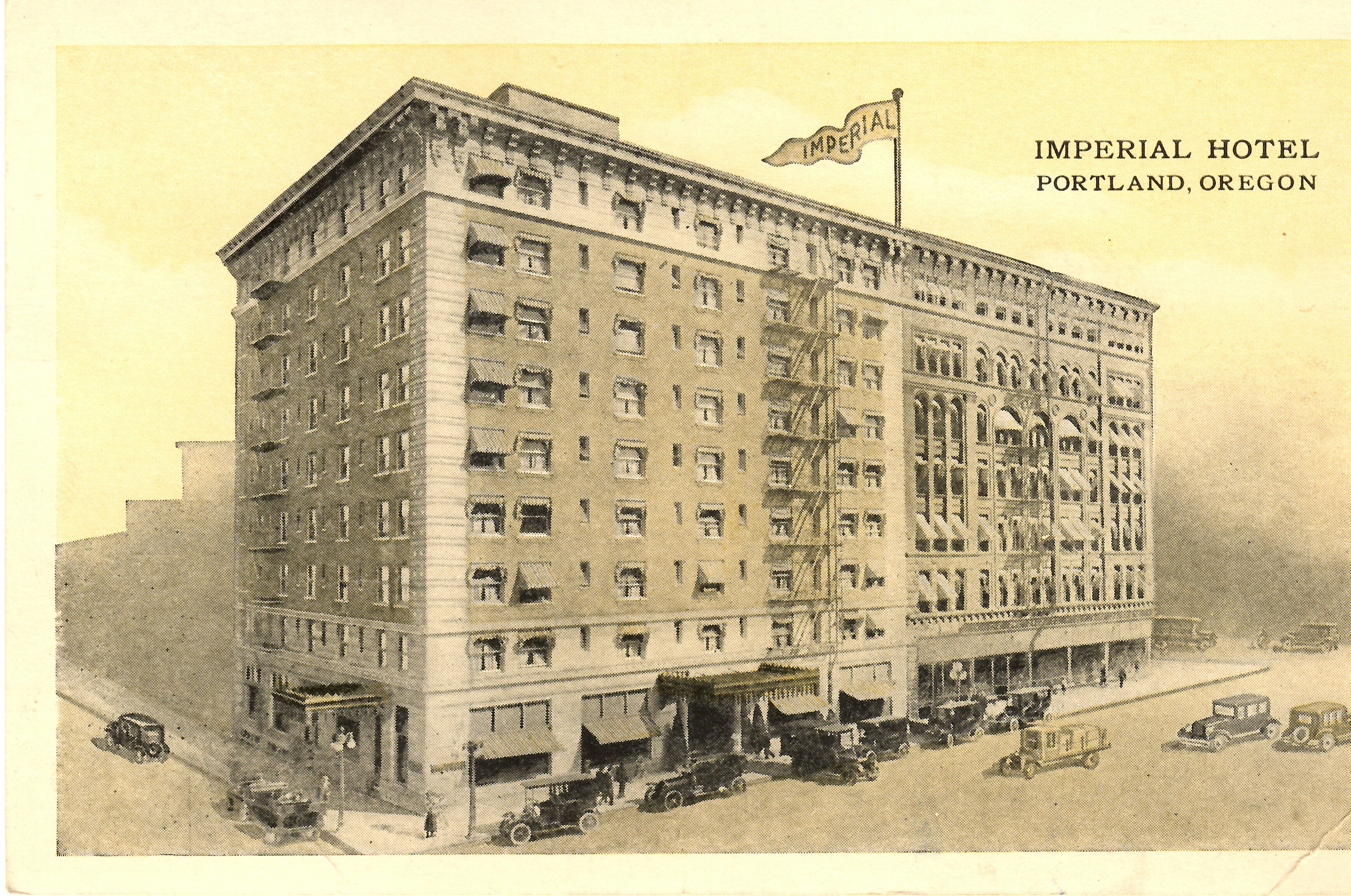
A circa 1910 postcard of the newly expanded hotel, with the new building on the left and the original building on the right

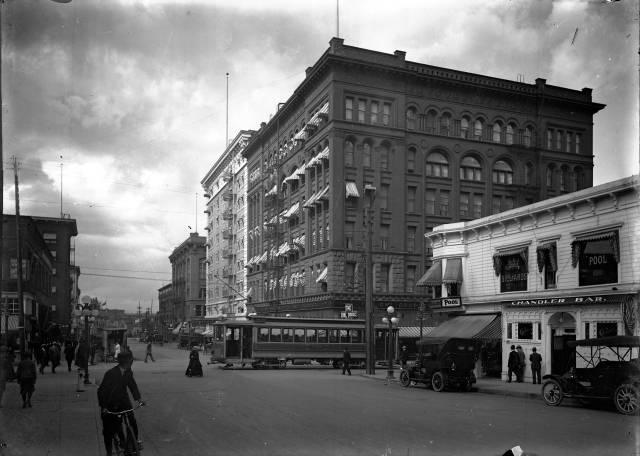
The Imperial Hotel circa 1915, with the newer (1909) building in the background

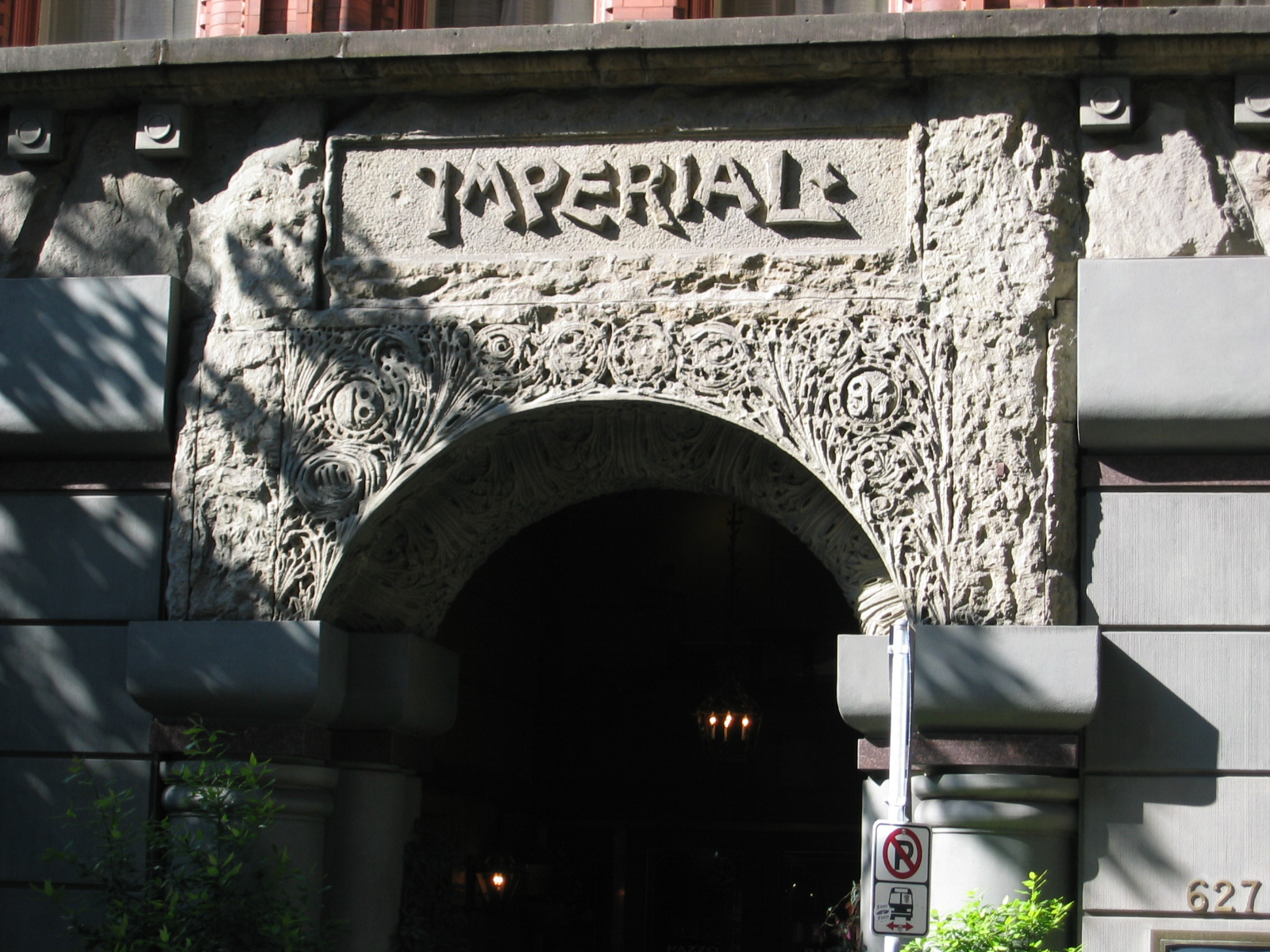
Stonework of the former Imperial name and 1894 date, above the Washington Street entrance

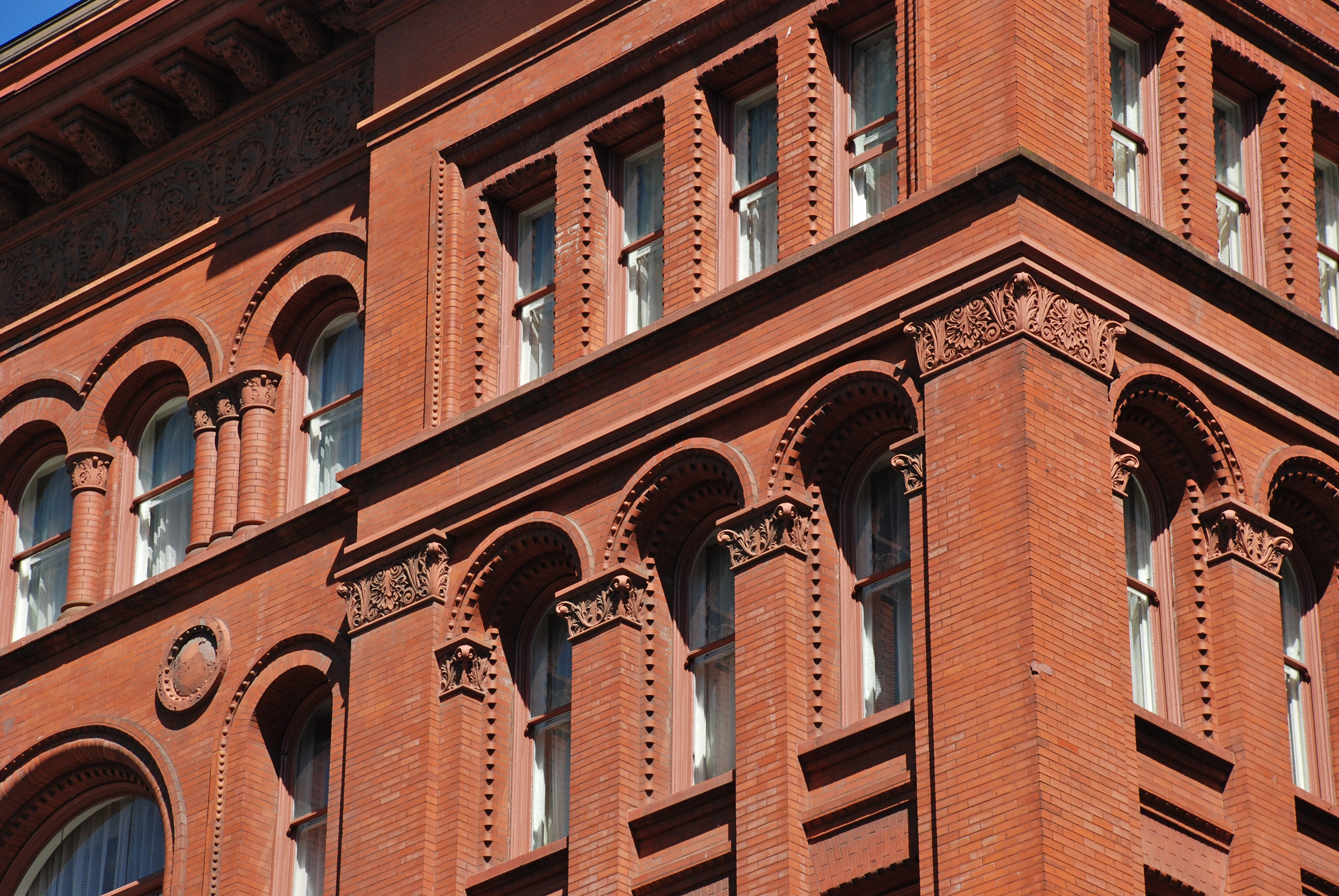
Detail view of exterior, upper floors
