= Paley's Place =

Restaurant in Portland, Oregon, U.S.

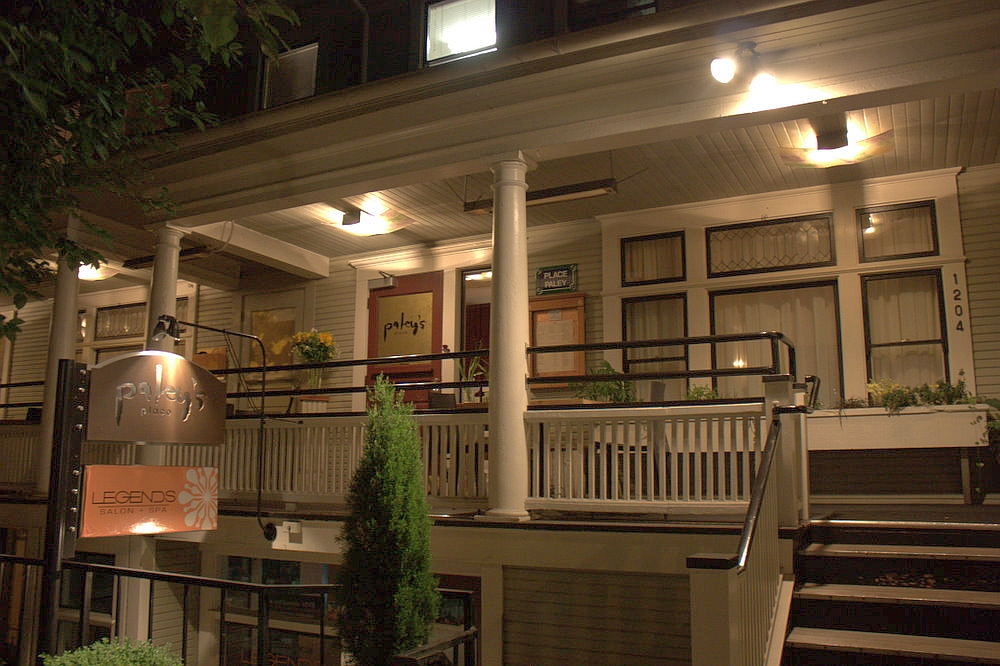
- Paley's Place, 2011
- Interactive map of Paley's Place

Restaurant information
- Established: 1995
- Closed: 2021
- Food type: Pacific Northwest
- Location: 1204 Northwest 21st Ave., Portland, Oregon, United States
- Coordinates: 45°31′50.1″N 122°41′39.8″W
- Website: paleysplace.net

Paley's Place was a restaurant serving Pacific Northwest cuisine in Portland, Oregon's Northwest District, in the United States.

== Description and history ==
Housed in a Victorian home along Northwest 21st Avenue, the restaurant was established by chef Vitaly and Kimberly Paley in 1995. Thrillist has described Paley's as "an intimate bistro-style eatery". Julian Smith of Frommer's rated the "upscale bistro" 2 out of 3 stars.

In October 2021, owners confirmed plans to close after Thanksgiving of that year.

== Reception ==
The business was included in Portland Monthly's 2025 list of 25 restaurants "that made Portland".

== See also ==
- James Beard Foundation Award: 2000s
- List of Pacific Northwest restaurants
