= List of Scandinavian restaurants =

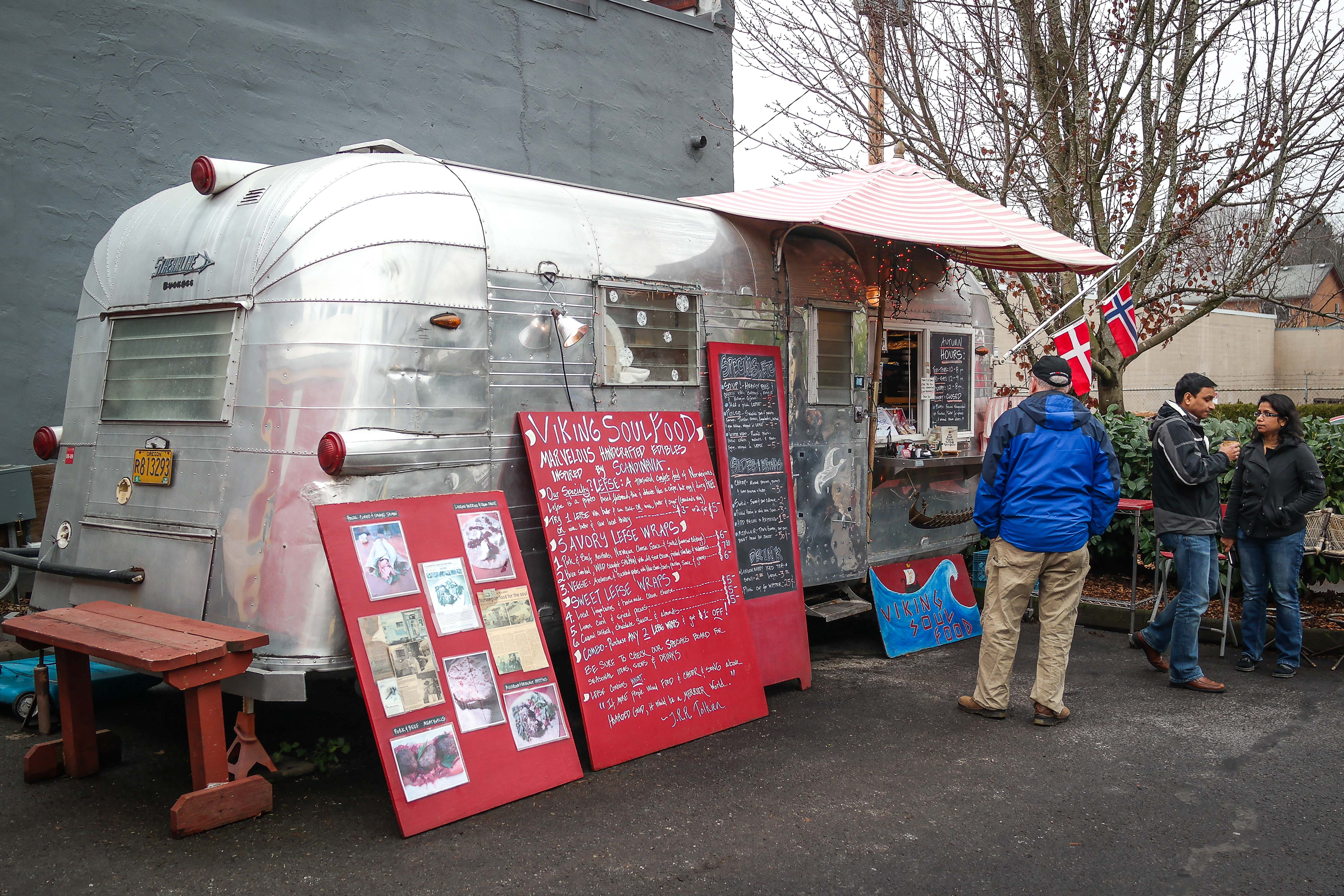
Viking Soul Food in Portland, Oregon, U.S.

Many notable restaurants serve Scandinavian cuisine.

Scandinavian restaurants
Name	Location
Agern	New York City, New York, U.S.
Aska	New York City, New York, U.S.
Broder	Oregon, U.S.
Restaurant Aquavit	New York City, New York, U.S.
Café Hagen	Seattle, Washington, U.S.
Ebbe	Tampa, Florida, U.S.
Elske	Chicago, Illinois, U.S.
Harald	Finland (chain)
Maurice	Portland, Oregon, U.S.
Mikko	Washington, D.C., U.S.
Mikla	Istanbul, Turkey
Radar	Portland, Oregon, U.S.
Viking Soul Food	Portland, Oregon, U.S.
