= Ripe Cooperative =

Defunct restaurant and marketplace in Portland, Oregon, U.S.

- Interactive map of Ripe Cooperative

Restaurant information
- Established: 2020
- Closed: 2022
- Location: Portland, Multnomah, Oregon, United States
- Coordinates: 45.56242°N 122.63505°W

Ripe Cooperative was a restaurant and marketplace in Portland, Oregon, United States. It was established by Naomi Pomeroy in 2020, in the space that had previously housed Beast, and closed in 2022.

== Description ==
Ripe Cooperative was a casual cafe and market in northeast Portland's Concordia neighborhood. The menu included a six-layer Lasagna Bolognese. It had a heated patio with a seating capacity of 26 people.

== History ==
Naomi Pomeroy started the business in 2020, in the space that previously housed Beast. The name alludes to Ripe, a catering company and supper club she and Michael Hebb started in 2002. Ripe Cooperative offered profit sharing.

In 2022, during the Russian invasion of Ukraine, Ripe Cooperative donated proceeds from Bulgarian Caviar to World Central Kitchen's relief efforts for Ukrainians, and proceeds from Ukrainian honey cake frozen custard to a food bank in Ukraine.

Ripe Cooperative closed in October 2022. Pomeroy became a consultant for Quaintrelle, and Dame Collective began operating in the space that had previously housed Beast and Ripe Cooperative.
