= Aska (restaurant) =

Scandinavian restaurant in Williamsburg, Brooklyn

- Interactive map of Aska

Restaurant information
- Established: 2012
- Head chef: Fredrik Berselius
- Food type: Scandinavian
- Rating: (Michelin Guide)
- Location: 47 South 5th Street, Brooklyn, New York, 11249, United States
- Coordinates: 40°42′44″N 73°57′59″W
- Website: askanyc.com

Aska is a two Michelin-starred, Scandinavian restaurant in Williamsburg, Brooklyn, founded by Swedish chef Fredrik Berselius. The name Aska means "ashes" in Swedish.

== History ==
Aska opened in 2012 at Kinfolk Studios in Williamsburg, Brooklyn. In the summer of 2016, Aska relocated to a restored 1860s warehouse building below the Williamsburg Bridge.

== Awards ==
In 2012, the Michelin Guide awarded the restaurant one star and Bon Appetit named it one of the ten best new restaurants in America. In 2016, after relocating, the Michelin guide awarded Aska two stars. That same year, the restaurant earned a three star New York Times review by the critic Pete Wells and a four star review from Eater. The Michelin Guide has awarded Aska two stars every year since.

== Cookbook ==
Berselius published his first cookbook, Aska, with Phaidon in the spring of 2018.

== See also ==
- List of Michelin-starred restaurants in New York City
- List of Scandinavian restaurants
