= El Gallo Taqueria =

Defunct Mexican restaurant in Portland, Oregon, U.S.

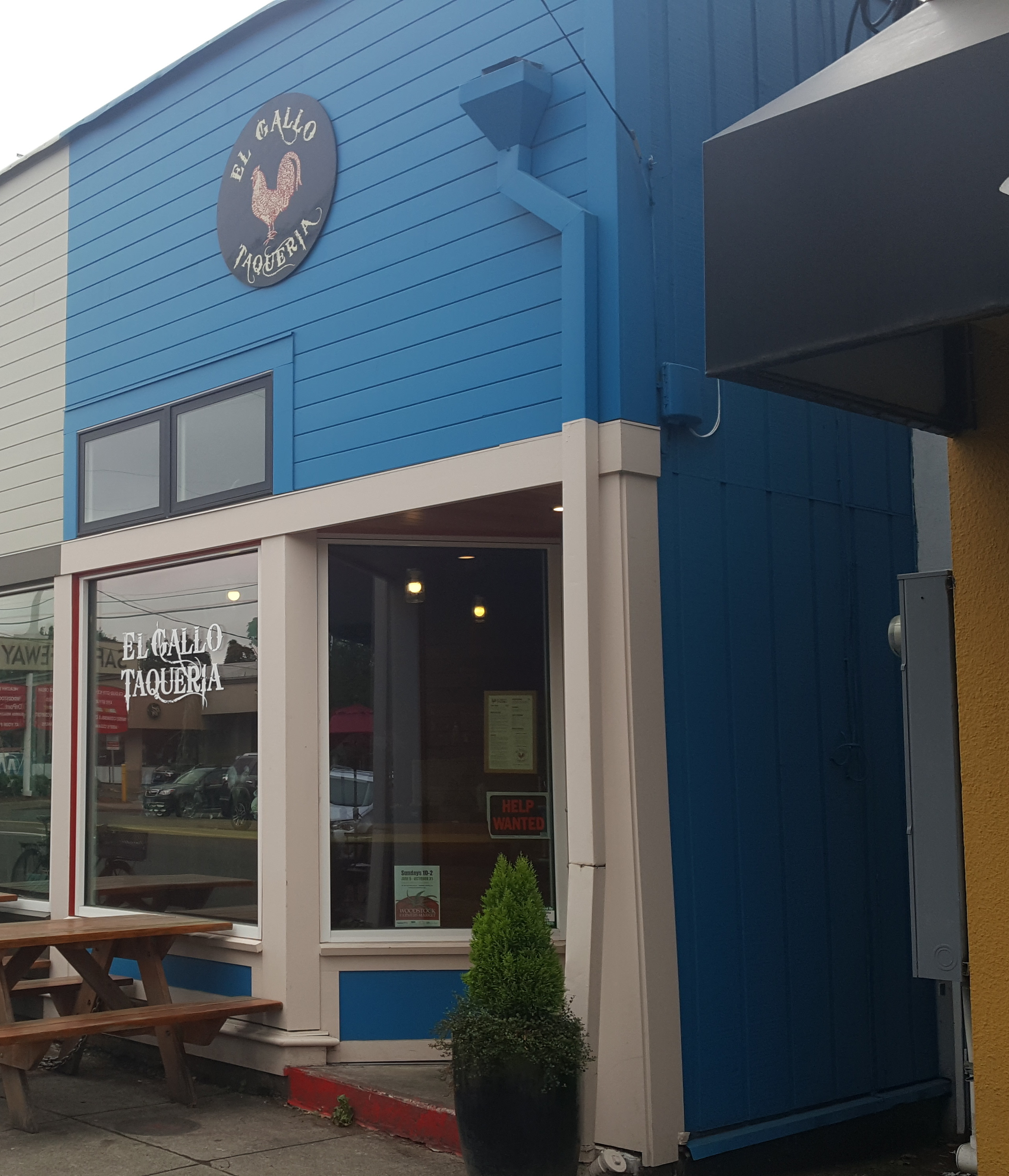
- The restaurant's exterior in 2021
- Interactive map of El Gallo Taqueria

Restaurant information
- Established: 2009
- Closed: July 23, 2022
- Owner: Jake Brown
- Chef: Jake Brown
- Food type: Mexican
- Location: 4422 Southeast Woodstock Boulevard, Portland, Multnomah, Oregon, 97206, United States
- Coordinates: 45.4790°N 122.6169°W

El Gallo Taqueria was a Mexican restaurant in Portland, Oregon, United States. Owner and chef Jake Brown established the business as a food cart in 2009, in southeast Portland's Woodstock neighborhood. In 2015, El Gallo relocated and began operating as a brick and mortar restaurant in 2015. The business closed in 2022.

== Description ==
El Gallo Taqueria was a Mexican restaurant in southeast Portland's Woodstock neighborhood. The Oregonian's Ben Waterhouse described the restaurant as "tiny but charming, finished in weathered boards with tabletops milled from wind-fallen maple trees salvaged from the canyon" at nearby Reed College. He wrote, "You won't get a very good view of the woodwork, though, because all the space not devoted to the kitchen, where three men in black t-shirts, aprons and baseball caps busily crank out tacos and burritos, is packed elbow-to-elbow with people eating or waiting to eat. If you linger, you can bet another customer is wishing death and dismemberment upon you."

The menu included tacos, breakfast burritos with eggs and chorizo, burritos with pinto beans and cabbage, and the Nevada tostada (meat, beans, cabbage and cheese on frybread). Taco varieties included al pastor with charred pineapple and cilantro as well as the "gringo", a hard-shell taco. The Mexican blackbird burrito had black beans and vegetables. The restaurant also had handmade tortillas, housemade chips and salsa, and Melt Yer Face habanero salsa. El Gallo's drink menu included Mexican bottled beers, Mexican sodas, and local beers on draft.

== History ==
From 2009 to December 2014, owner and chef Jake Brown operated El Gallo Taqueria as a food cart in the parking lot of The Joinery on Woodstock Boulevard. According to the Bee, El Gallo was the first food cart to operate in Woodstock. The Portland Business Journal called the cart "one of the most sustainable" in the city, using energy efficient appliances and food sourced daily from nearby farms and farmers' markets.

In 2014, Brown began renovating a 420-square-foot space next to an Ace Hardware store several blocks away, making upgrades to meet the Energy Trust of Oregon's green building and sustainability standards. With the move came an expanded menu, longer hours of operation, and seating. In November 2014, Danielle Centoni of Eater Portland confirmed plans for the restaurant to open in February 2015.

The restaurant closed on July 23, 2022. Brown wrote, "While this was a difficult conclusion to come to, this is the best decision for the business and me personally. Having the privilege to cook and serve the Woodstock Community for the past 13 years has been an honor." El Gallo was replaced by Viking Soul Food.

== Reception ==
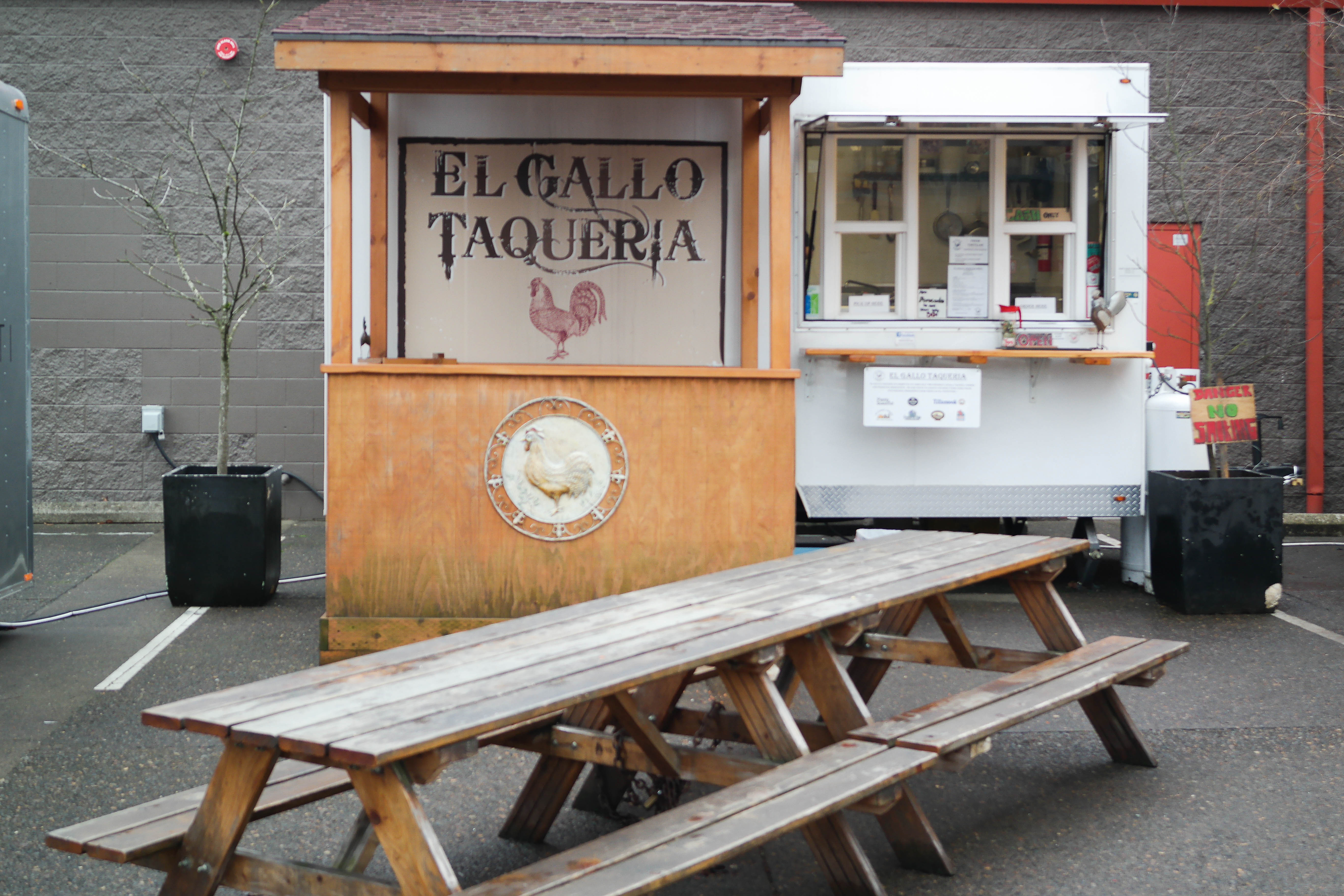
El Gallo Taqueria operating as a food cart in 2013

In 2015, shortly after the brick and mortar restaurant opened, Ben Waterhouse of The Oregonian wrote, "When the restaurant opened in February, the line stretched out the door as hungry fans happily waited an hour or more in eager anticipation. Spring had finally arrived. El Gallo was back." He called the Mexican blackbird burrito an "absolute standout" and said the "gringo" taco "might be the best hard-shell taco in town, with enough masa texture left that it still tastes like real food". Samantha Bakall included El Gallo in the newspaper's 2016 list of the city's 25 best Mexican restaurants.

Willamette Week named El Gallo one of Portland's five best food carts. Nathan Williams recommended El Gallo in Eater Portland's 2020 overview of eateries in the Woodstock neighborhood. Thrillist said, "El Gallo serves some of the best Mexican food in the city... This might be the closest you can get to Mexico City street tacos here in Portland."

== See also ==
- Hispanics and Latinos in Portland, Oregon
- List of Mexican restaurants
