= Naomi Pomeroy =

American chef (1974–2024)

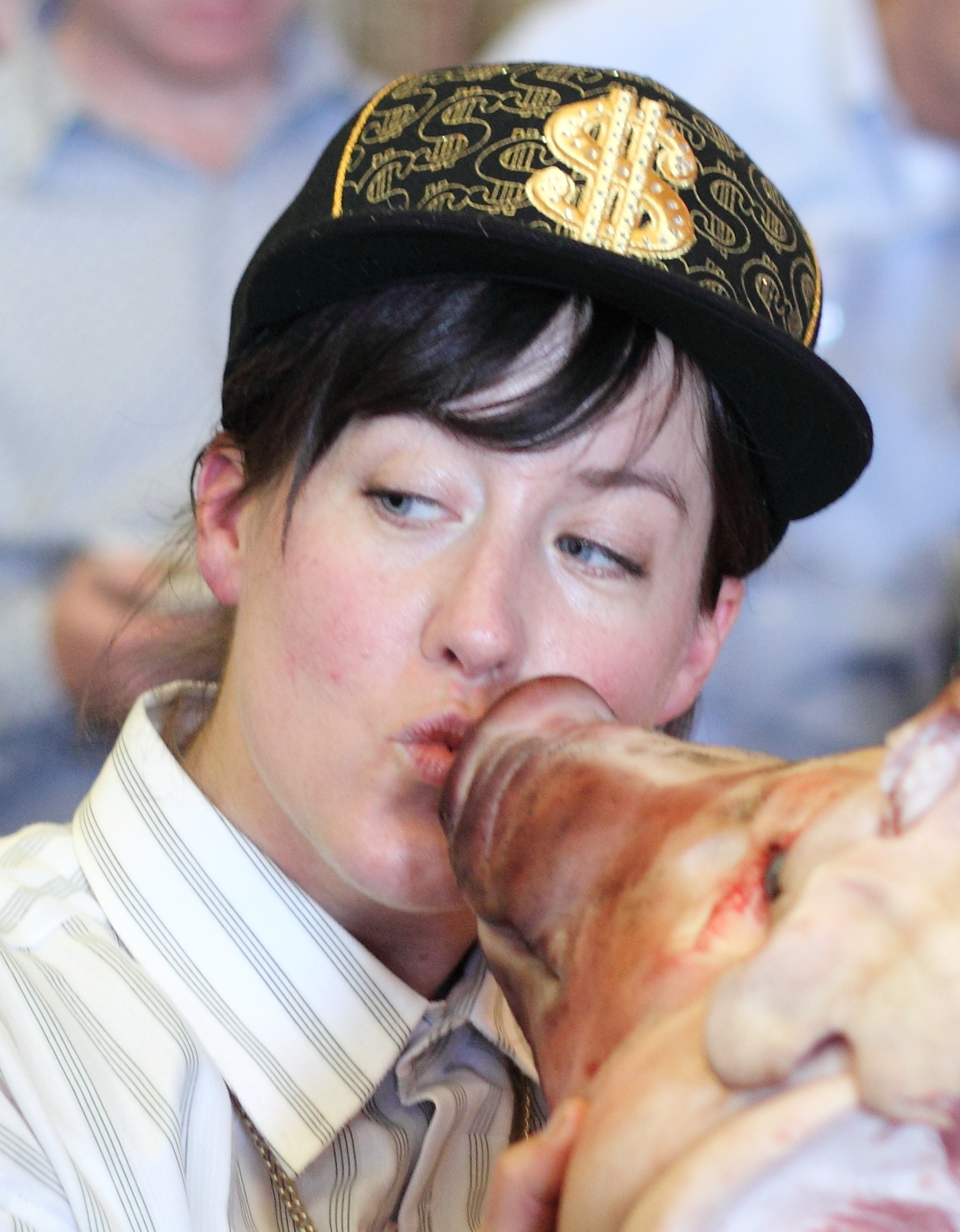
- Pomeroy in 2010
- Born: November 30, 1974; Corvallis, Oregon, U.S.
- Died: July 13, 2024 (aged 49); Benton County, Oregon, U.S.
- Education: Lewis & Clark College (BA)
- Spouse: Michael Hebb (divorced) Kyle Linden Webster (m. 2012)
- Culinary career
- Previous restaurants
- Clarklewis; Gotham Tavern; Beast (2007–2020); Ripe Cooperative (2020–2022)
- Awardss
- James Beard Award – Best Chef Northwest; 2014

Naomi Pomeroy (November 30, 1974 – July 13, 2024) was an American chef and restaurateur. Pomeroy in 2009 was listed by Food & Wine magazine as one of America's Top 10 Best New Chefs and in 2014 won the James Beard Foundation Award for Best Chef Northwest.

Pomeroy was influential in developing Portland, Oregon's culinary scene.

Pomeroy opened or owned several restaurants in the Portland area. She appeared on multiple cooking competition shows, including as a contestant on Top Chef Masters and Iron Chef and as a judge on Top Chef, Knife Fight and Bobby's Triple Threat. She published her first cookbook in 2016.

== Early life and education ==
Pomeroy was born in Corvallis, Oregon, on November 30, 1974, to Toby Jean Pomeroy, a jeweler, and Karen Walz. She had three half brothers. In an interview, Pomeroy explained that she began cooking at the age of three and created her first recipe at the age of four. Pomeroy graduated from Corvallis High School in 1993 before going on to Lewis & Clark College where she graduated in 1997 with a degree in history.

== Career ==
Pomeroy had no formal culinary or business training; she developed her skills by watching other food-industry professionals. In the early 2000s, she and her then-partner, both in their twenties, ran a pop-up supper series. According to The New York Times, those events "helped start Portland's renegade restaurant culture and the national pop-up restaurant craze". According to Portland Monthly, the dinners "managed to spin Portland its own cultural and gastronomic empire out of thin air".

In 2007, she opened the restaurant Beast in Portland, Oregon. Previously, she started Gotham Tavern, Gotham Coffee shop, and Clarklewis with Michael Hebb. In 2013, Working Mother magazine featured an article detailing Pomeroy's experiences as a working single parent.

In 2010, Pomeroy appeared on Iron Chef and lost to Chef Jose Garces. She appeared on the 2011 season of Top Chef Masters. Her television appearances also include serving as a judge on Top Chef, Bobby's Triple threat, and Knife Fight. Pomeroy also spoke at a TedxPortland Talk in 2013.

Pomeroy published her first cookbook in 2016 with Ten Speed Press. According to Publishers Weekly, the working title for the cookbook was Oui: Lessons from an Award-Winning Self-Taught Chef. Pomeroy's cookbook, released in 2016, was entitled Taste & Technique: Recipes to Elevate Your Home Cooking.

Her restaurant, Beast, closed in 2020 during the COVID-19 pandemic, and Pomeroy used the space for a new venture called Ripe Cooperative, a marketplace that also sold meal boxes for customers to finish at home until 2022. During the pandemic she helped found the Independent Restaurant Coalition, an organization that advocated for federal assistance for US restaurants and restaurant employees.

=== Recognition ===
In 2009, Pomeroy was listed by Food & Wine as one of the ten best new chefs in the U.S. As a restaurateur, she was recognized in the October 2010 issue of Marie Claire as one of the eighteen most powerful women in business. O, The Oprah Magazine mentioned her career endeavors and named her as one of the top ten "women on the rise" for 2010. In 2014, Pomeroy won the James Beard Foundation Award for Best Chef Northwest. According to Portland Monthly, she was "synonymous with Portland's independent food scene". Eater Portland, reacting to her death, said Pomeroy "helped define the Portland culinary scene that so captured the national imagination in the early aughts". According to The New York Times, she was the city's "culinary matriarch" and had "made Portland a dining destination".

== Personal life and death ==
Pomeroy was married to Michael Hebb; they had a daughter, August, and later divorced. Pomeroy later married Kyle Linden Webster in 2012. On July 13, 2024, she drowned in the Willamette River, near Corvallis, when she fell from an inner tube she was floating on amid a fast current. Her body was recovered on July 17.

== See also ==
- Cornet Custard
- James Beard Foundation Award: 2010s
