= Mikko (restaurant) =

Nordic restaurant in Washington, D.C., United States

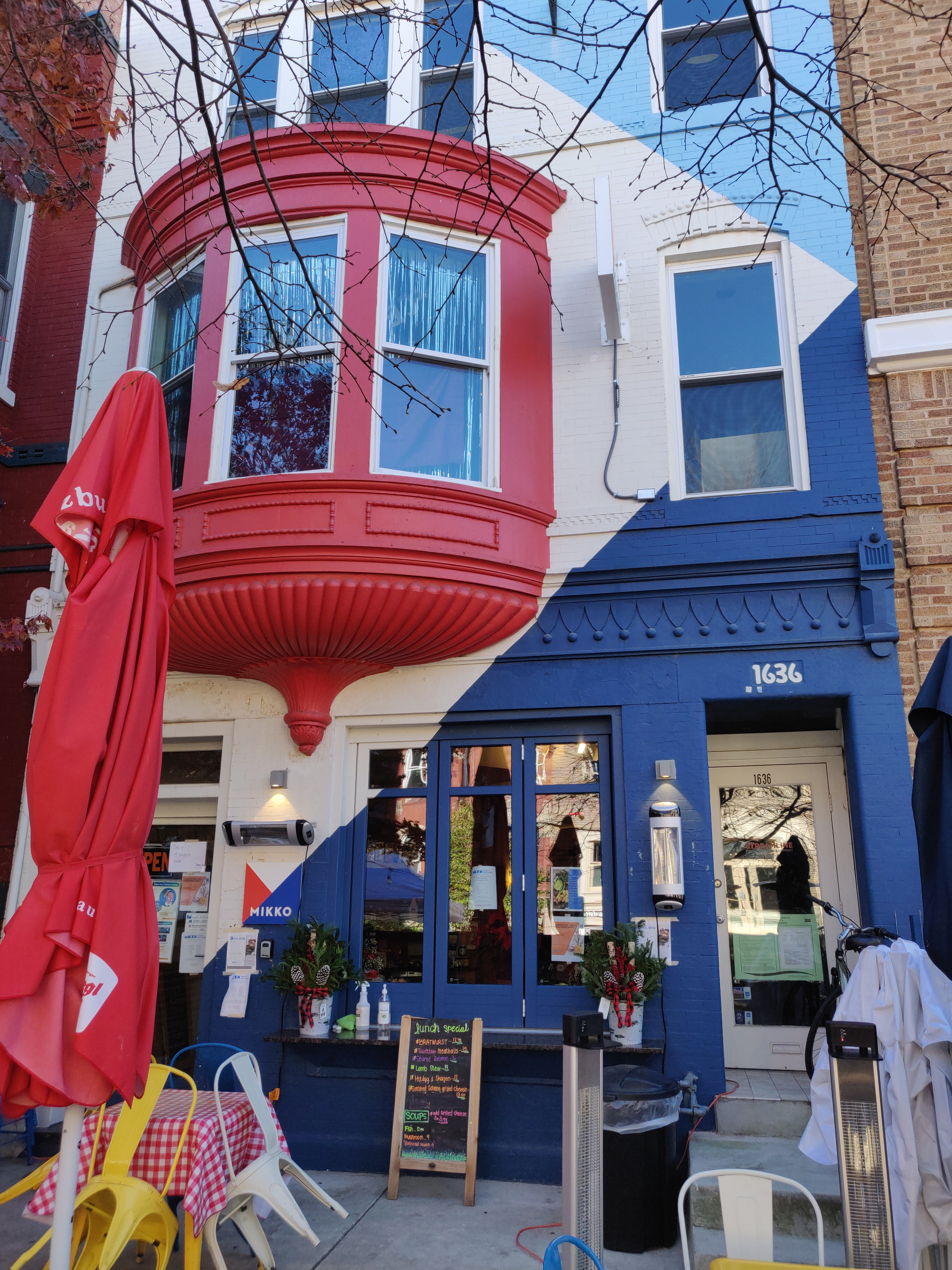
- Exterior of Mikko in November 2020
- Interactive map of Mikko

Restaurant information
- Established: May 1, 2018
- Owner: Mikko Kosonen
- Food type: Nordic
- Location: 1636 R St. NW, Washington, D.C., United States
- Coordinates: 38.912412°N 77.037939°W
- Website: chefmikko.com

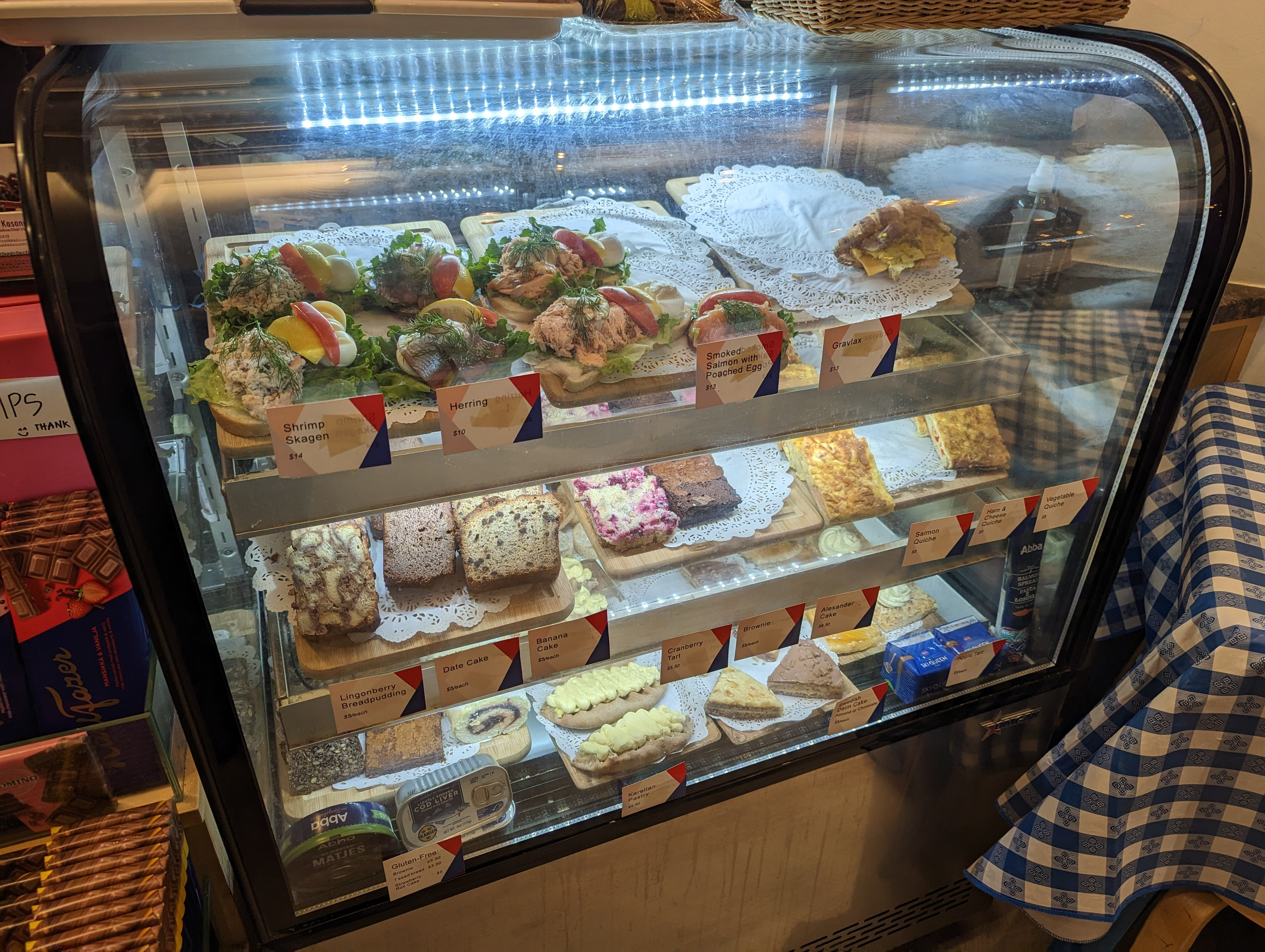
Display case

Mikko, formally Mikko Nordic Fine Foods, is a restaurant and catering service in the Dupont Circle neighborhood of Washington, D.C., United States, specializing in Nordic cuisine. The restaurant was opened in 2018 by Mikko Kosonen, who was previously the executive chef for the Ambassador of Finland for more than 15 years. It is located in a townhouse on R Street NW that Kosonen painted in the bright colors of the Nordic flags. It has received praise from food critics, who have highlighted its novelty as one of the only Nordic restaurants in the city.

== See also ==
- List of Scandinavian restaurants
