= Beast (restaurant) =

Defunct restaurant in Portland, Oregon, US

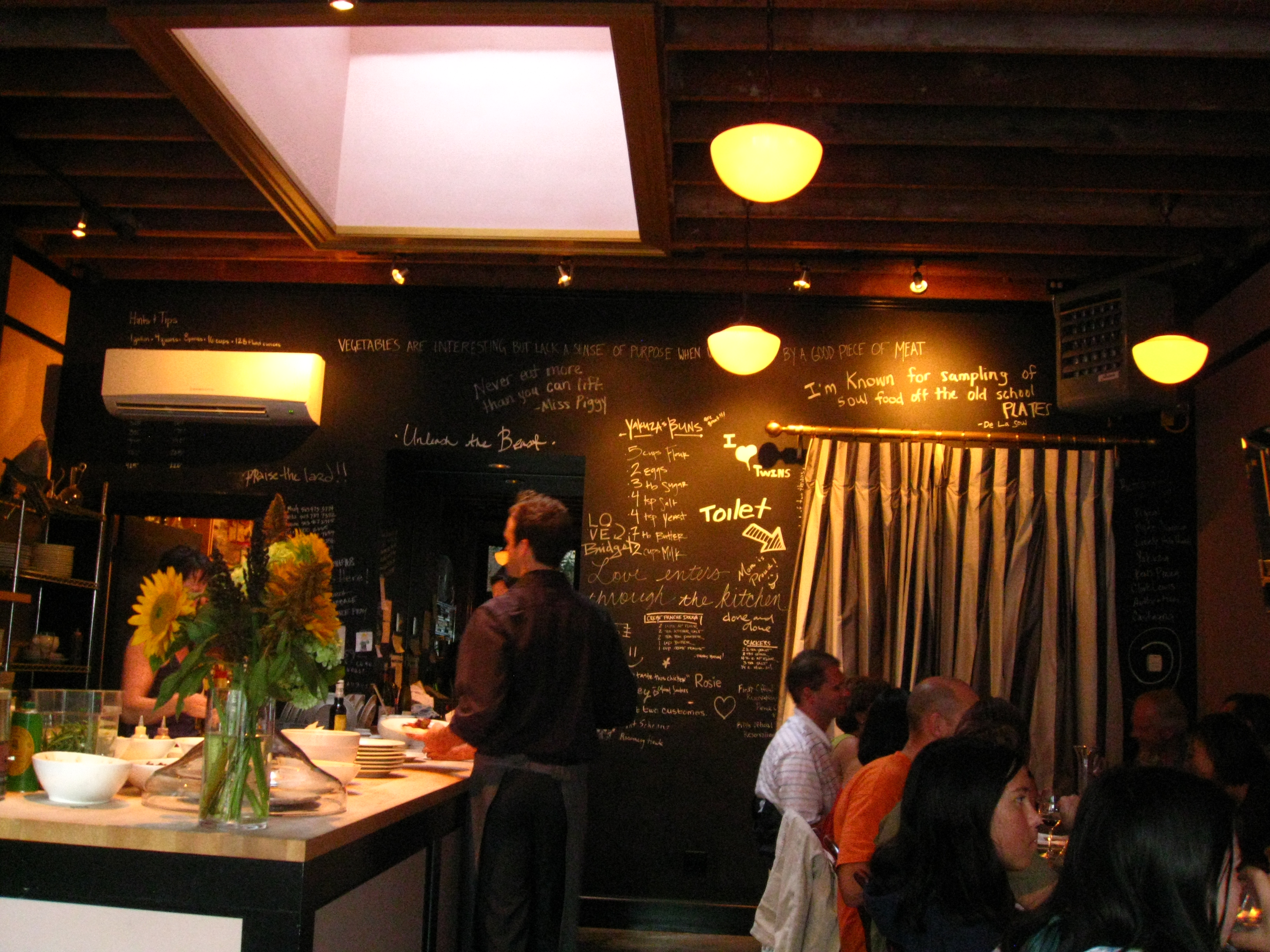
- The restaurant's interior, 2008
- Interactive map of Beast

Restaurant information
- Established: 2007
- Closed: 2020
- Owner: Naomi Pomeroy
- Chef: Naomi Pomeroy
- Location: 5425 Northeast 30th Avenue, Portland, Oregon, 97211, United States
- Coordinates: 45.5624°N 122.6351°W

Beast was a restaurant in Portland, Oregon, United States. The business earned chef and owner Naomi Pomeroy a James Beard Foundation Award for Best Chef: Northwest in 2014.

== Name ==
The restaurant served French and Pacific Northwest cuisine in a 600-square-foot dining room with two tables for communal dining. The restaurant served prix fixe dinners as well as brunch.

== History ==
Pomeroy opened Beast in 2007 with business partner Micah Camden and sous chef Mika Paredes. Pomeroy was negotiating a lease to relocate the business as of 2012.

The restaurant closed in March 2020 due to the COVID-19 pandemic. The space was converted into a market called Ripe Cooperative.

== Reception ==
Beast and Le Pigeon were named co-2008 Restaurants of the Year by The Oregonian. Beast won the Best Prix Fixe Menu category of Willamette Week's annual Best of Portland readers' poll in 2016. The business was included in Portland Monthly's 2025 list of 25 restaurants "that made Portland".

== See also ==
- Impact of the COVID-19 pandemic on the restaurant industry in the United States
- James Beard Foundation Award: 2010s
- List of French restaurants
- List of Pacific Northwest restaurants
