= Broder (restaurant) =

Restaurant chain in the U.S. state of Oregon

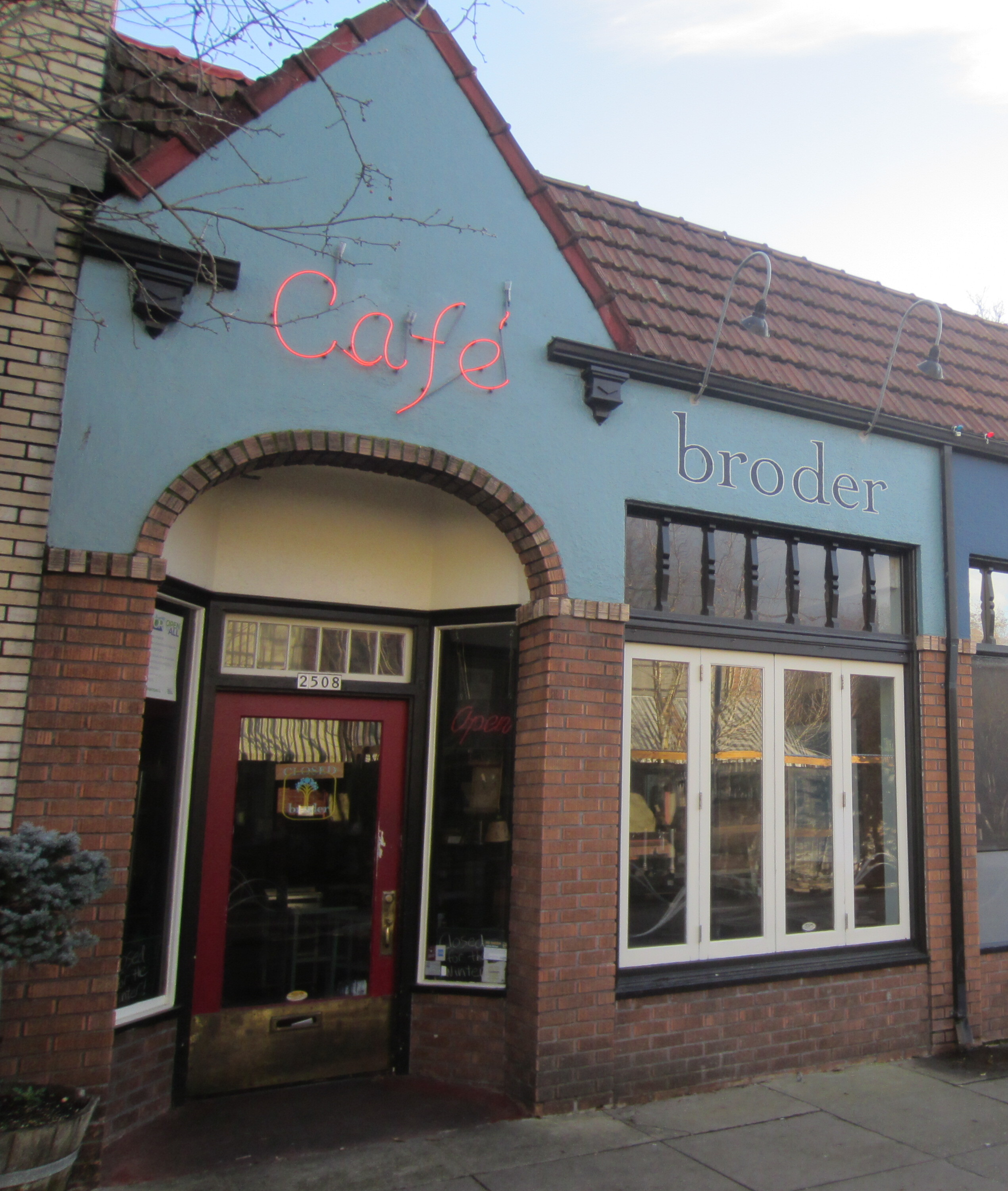
- Exterior of the original restaurant in Southeast Portland, Oregon, 2021

Restaurant information
- Owners: Peter Bro; Martin Hulth
- Food type: Scandinavian
- Location: Portland; Hood River; Astoria, Oregon, United States
- Website: broderpdx.com

Broder is a small chain of Scandinavian restaurants in the U.S. state of Oregon. In addition to the original restaurant in Southeast Portland (Broder Café), the business operates Broder Nord in Northeast Portland, Broder Söder in Southwest Portland, Broder Øst in Hood River, and Broder Strand in Astoria. Peter Bro and Martin Hulth are co-owners.

== Description ==
Broder (Swedish for "Brother") refers to a small chain of Scandinavian restaurants in Oregon. There are locations in Portland, Hood River, and Astoria. The menu includes æbleskiver, a breakfast sandwich with eggs, lemon-dill pesto, and trout hash. Broder has also served bacon, fritters, lamb burgers, meatballs, Danish pancakes with lemon curd and lingonberry jam, Bloody Marys, and Swedish coffee.

== History and locations ==
The business is co-owned by Peter Bro and Martin Hulth.

Broder Café, also known as Café Broder or simply Broder, operates on Clinton Street in Southeast Portland's Hosford-Abernethy neighborhood. American chef Andrew Zimmern visited the eatery for an episode of the Travel Channel series The Zimmern List.

In North Portland, Broder Nord opened on North Interstate Avenue, in the space previously occupied by Gotham Tavern. It had a seating capacity of approximately 90 people and featured a grab-and-go market. The restaurant relocated from Interstate Avenue to Mississippi Avenue, in the Boise neighborhood. In 2024, Broder Nord launched a hotdog window called Bra Hund (Swedish for "good dog").

Broder Söder ("South" in Swedish) operates in Southwest Portland. It opened on August 4, 2015.

Broder Øst operates in Hood River. The eatery's name translates to "Brotherly East" in Norwegian. Chad Hinman, a longtime manager at the original restaurant, is a co-owner.

Broder Strand opened in Astoria in 2023.

In 2026, Broder was among local restaurants, community organizations, and other businesses that joined the "We Are Rip City" campaign in support of the Moda Center renovation project.

== Reception ==
Broder Nord was included in Eater Portland's 2025 list of Portland's best brunch restaurants.

== See also ==
- List of Scandinavian restaurants
