= Cornet Custard =

Frozen custard shop in Portland, Oregon, U.S.

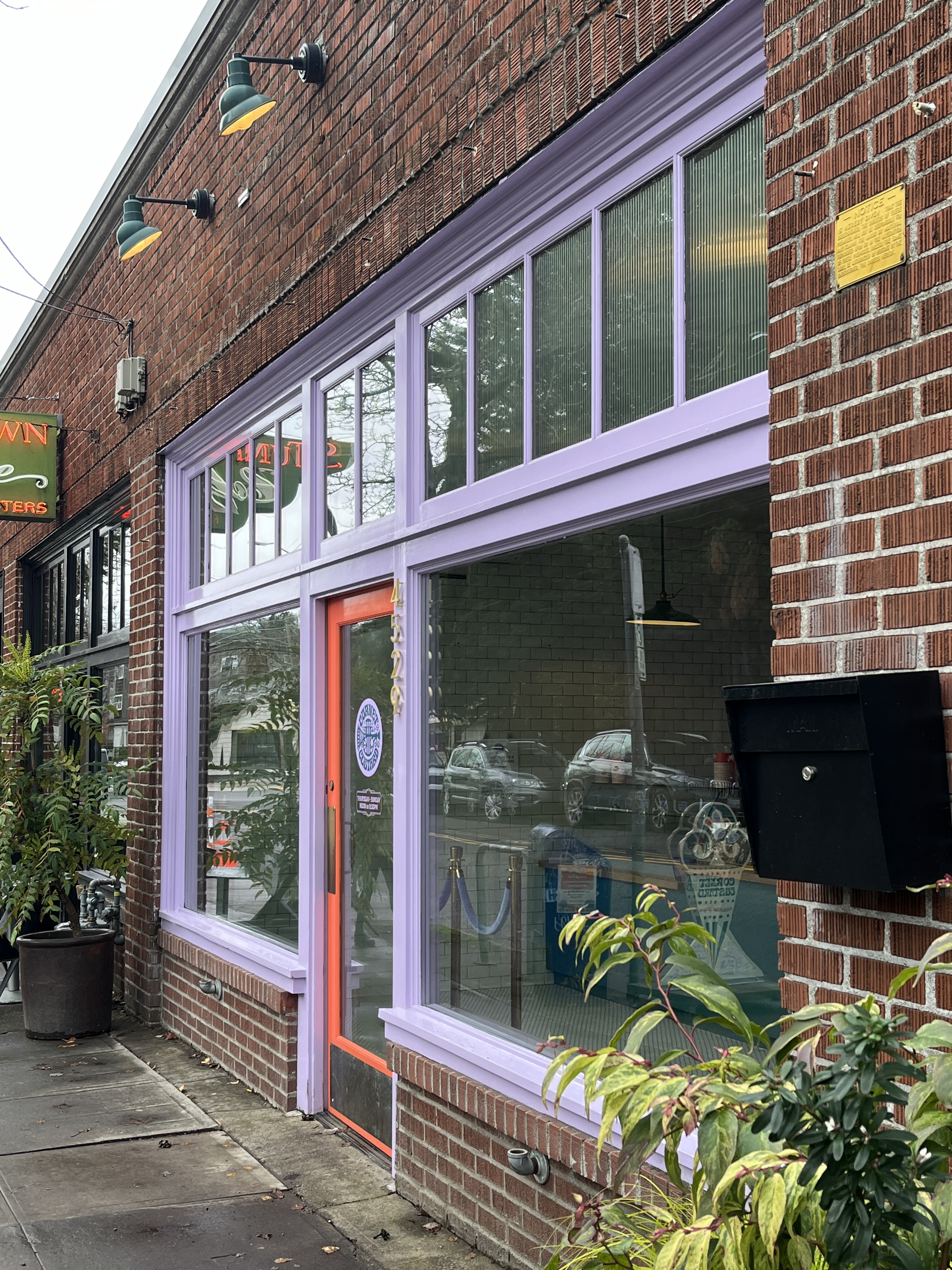
- The shop's exterior, 2024
- Interactive map of Cornet Custard

Restaurant information
- Established: June 14, 2024
- Owner: Mika Paredes
- Previous owner: Naomi Pomeroy
- Location: Portland, Multnomah, Oregon, United States
- Coordinates: 45.50542°N 122.615486°W

Cornet Custard is a frozen custard shop in Portland, Oregon, United States. It opened in June 2024.

== Description ==
Cornet Custard operates on Division Street in southeast Portland's Richmond neighborhood, in the space that previously housed Woodsman Market. Cornet shares an outdoor space with neighboring Stumptown Coffee Roasters. Custard flavors have included cardamom-mango and salted caramel.

== History ==
Cornet Custard operated from Colibri, before relocating and opening from a brick and mortar space on June 14, 2024. The business was co-founded and co-owned by pastry chef Mika Paredes and Naomi Pomeroy, who died in July. A makeshift memorial was created outside the shop following her death.

== Reception ==
Cornet won in the Best Desserts category of Eater Portland's annual Eater Awards in 2024.

== See also ==
- List of frozen custard companies
- List of ice cream brands
