= Viking Soul Food =

Scandinavian restaurant in Portland, Oregon, U.S.

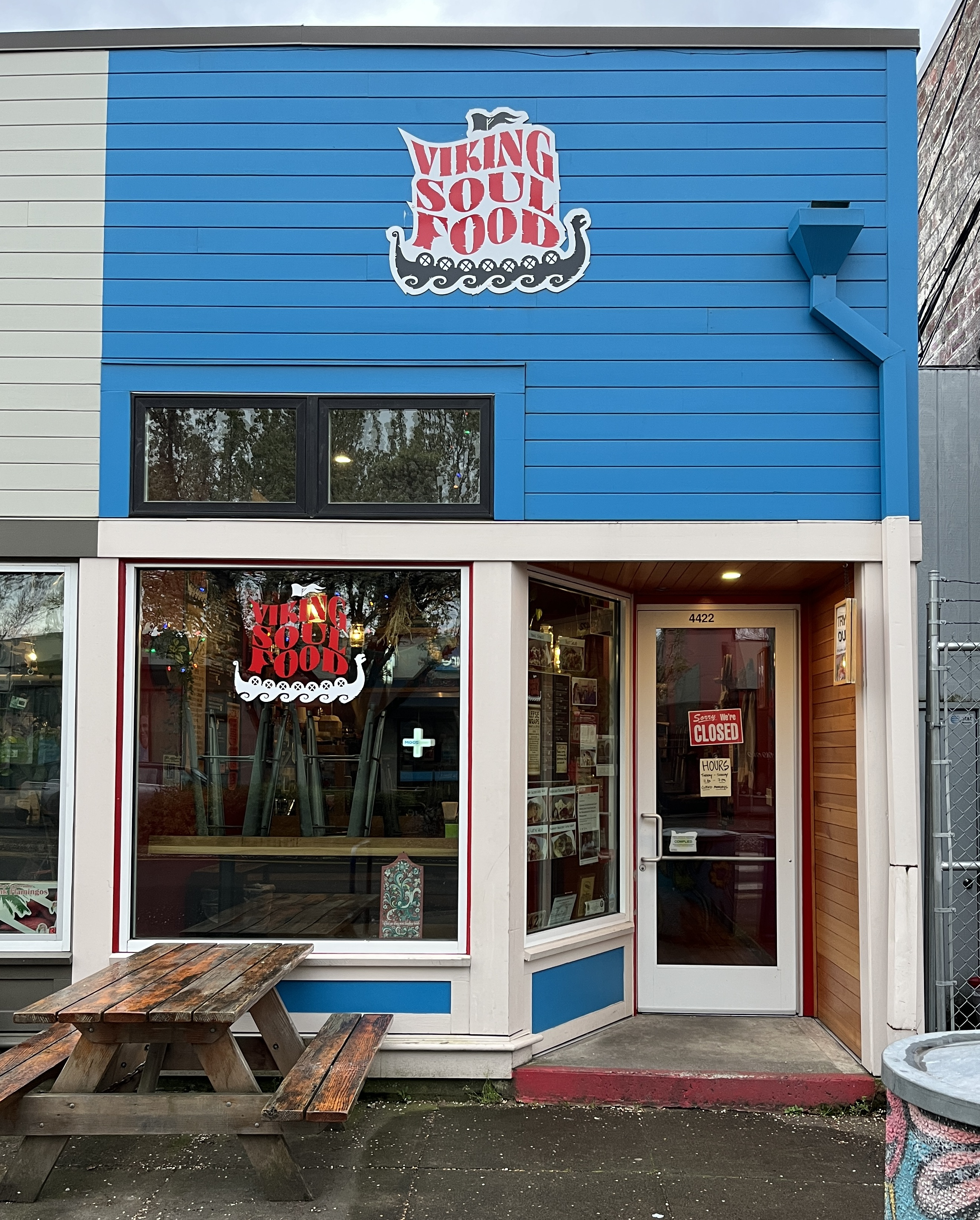
- The restaurant's exterior, 2025
- Interactive map of Viking Soul Food

Restaurant information
- Established: August 2010
- Food type: Scandinavian
- Location: Portland, Oregon, United States
- Coordinates: 45.5168°N 122.6185°W
- Website: vikingsoulfood.com

Viking Soul Food is a Scandinavian restaurant in Portland, Oregon, United States. The business operates in southeast Portland's Woodstock neighborhood and previously operated from Airstream trailer in the Sunnyside neighborhood. Viking Soul Food has been featured on the Food Network's Diners, Drive-Ins and Dives.

== Description ==
Viking Soul Food (VSF) is a Scandinavian restaurant in southeast Portland's Woodstock neighborhood. Previously, the business operated from an Airstream trailer on Belmont Street, in the Bite On Belmont food cart pod in southeast Portland's Sunnyside neighborhood.

In 2020, Christen McCurdy of Willamette Week said the Black-owned restaurant serves "Scandinavian-soul fusion" food, and the Portland Mercury's Robert Ham described the menu as "Nordic-inspired" comfort food. The menu includes lefse (potato-based Norwegian flatbread) with meatballs with gravy or smoked salmon, dill, greens, and creme fraiche, as well as seafood chowder and lingonberry iced tea.

== History ==
Megan Walhood and Jeremy Daniels have operated VSF since August 2010. The restaurant appeared on season 32, episode 11 ("From Vikings to Wings") of the Food Network's Diners, Drive-Ins, and Dives. In 2014, the duo announced plans to close and sell the Airstream.

Some VSF menu options are also available at the duo's food cart The Wild Hunt, which opened in 2016.

In 2022, owners announced plans to move to a brick and mortar restaurant in Woodstock, occupying the space which previously housed El Gallo Taqueria. The restaurant opened on November 26. In 2024, Walhood and Daniels confirmed plans to sell the 1958 Streamline trailer, and update the menu at the Woodstock restaurant.

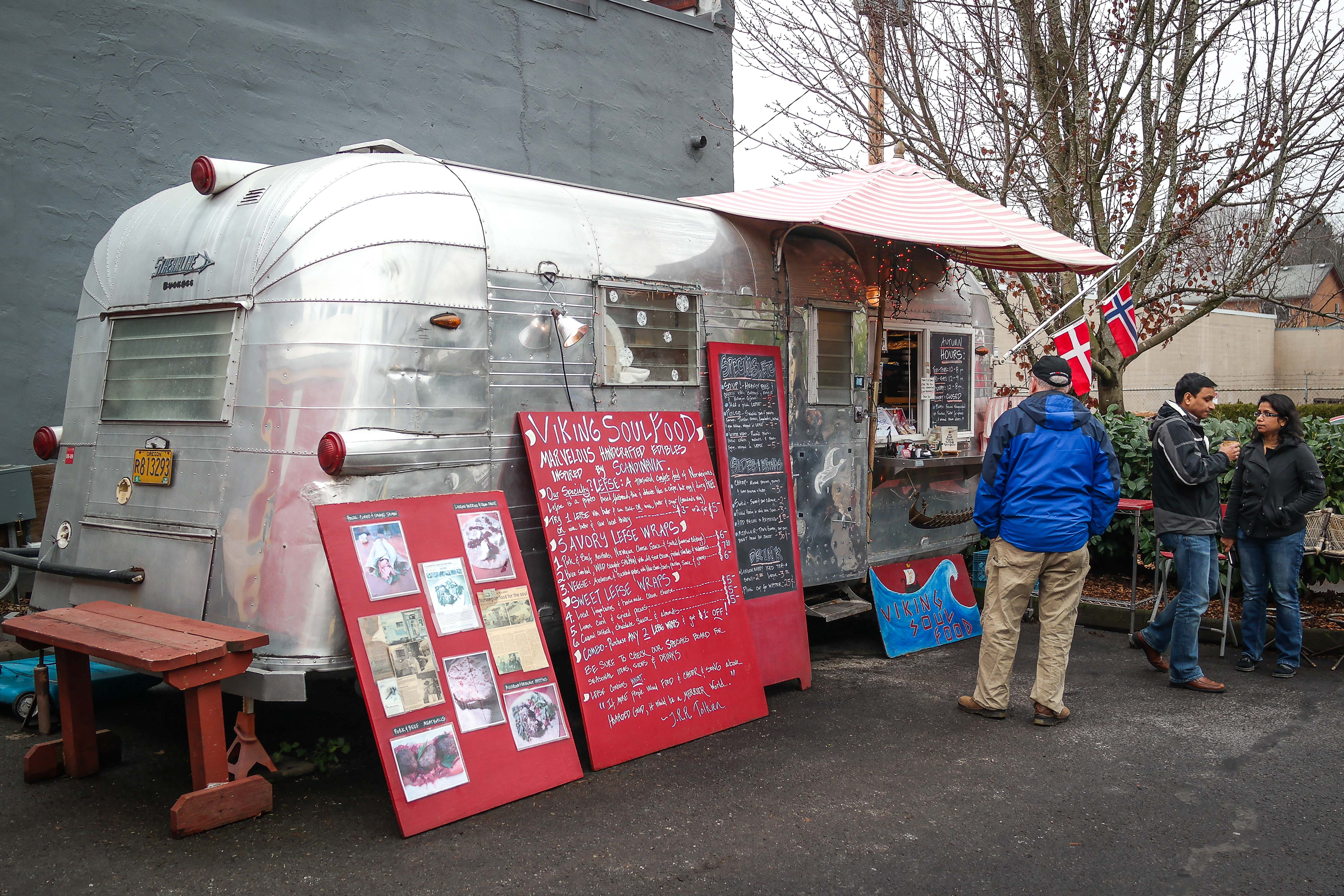
The Streamline trailer in 2013

== Reception ==
Nick Woo and Brooke Jackson-Glidden included VSF in Eater Portland's 2021 guide to the city's "most outstanding" food carts. Jackson-Glidden also included the smoked steelheadlefse in a 2024 overview of "iconic" Portland dishes. VSF was also included in the website's 2025 list of Portland's best restaurants for mid-week lunches. Paolo Bicchieri included the business in Eater Portland's 2025 overview of the city's best restaurants for lunch.

== See also ==
- List of Black-owned restaurants
- List of Diners, Drive-Ins and Dives episodes
- List of Scandinavian restaurants
