= Quaintrelle (restaurant) =

Restaurant in Portland, Oregon, U.S.

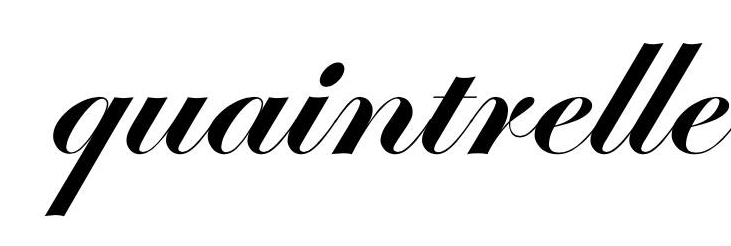

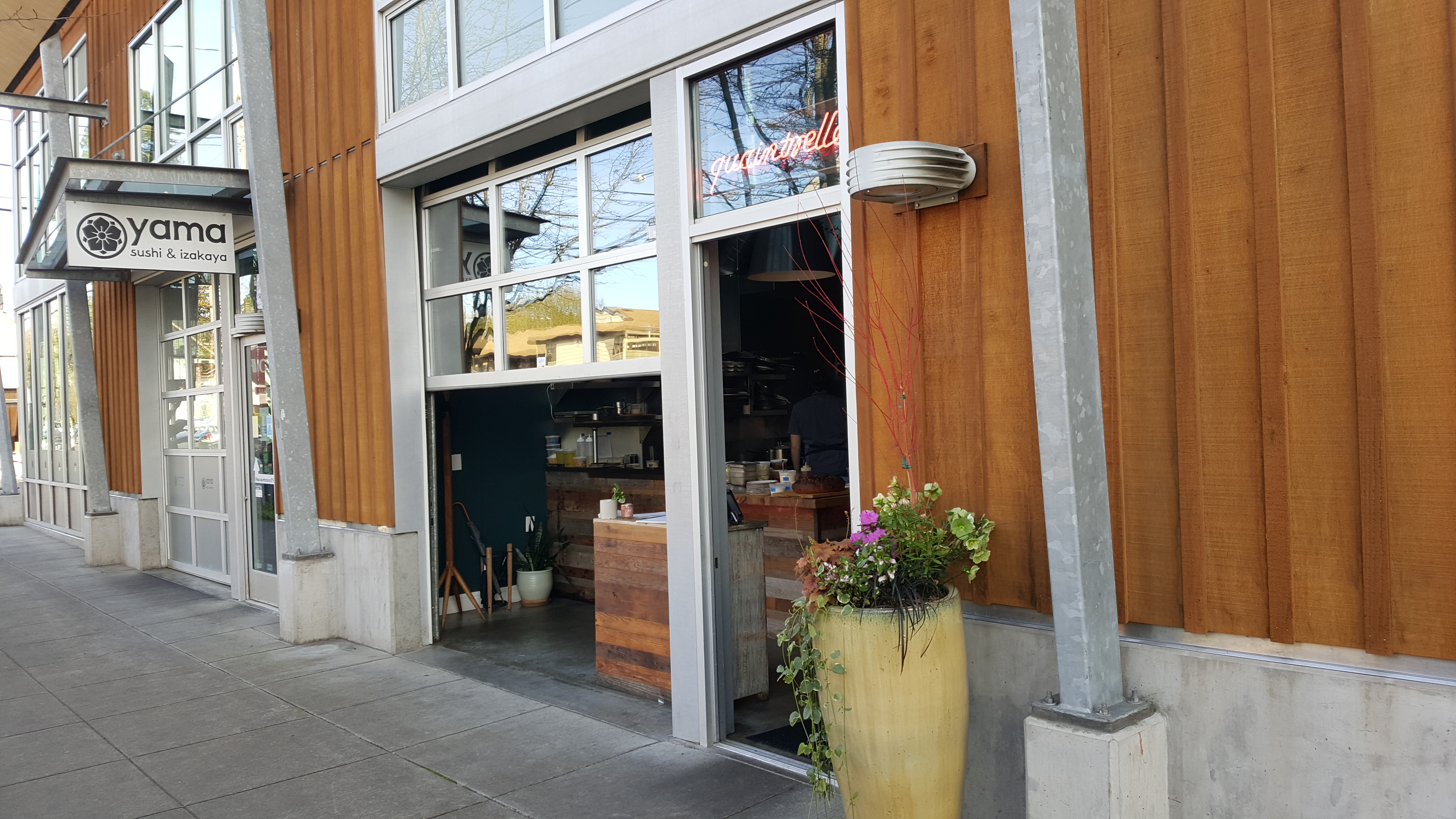
- The restaurant's exterior in March 2022
- Interactive map of Quaintrelle

Restaurant information
- Established: 2016; 10 years ago
- Closed: January 1, 2025; 18 months ago
- Food type: New American
- Location: 2032 Southeast Clinton Street, Portland, Oregon, United States
- Coordinates: 45°30′11.9″N 122°38′41.7″W
- Website: quaintrelle.co

Quaintrelle was a New American restaurant in Portland, Oregon, United States. It closed permanently on January 1, 2025.

== Description and history ==
Quaintrelle was a New American restaurant on Clinton Street in southeast Portland's Hosford-Abernethy neighborhood. The restaurant was established in 2016, originally operating on Mississippi Avenue in the north Portland part of the Boise neighborhood before relocating in 2021.

Ryley Eckersley was a chef. The restaurant's seating capacity was approximately 65 (20 indoors and 45 outdoors). Willamette Week has described Quaintrelle as a "whimsical" fine dining restaurant.

In 2023, Naomi Pomeroy became a consultant for Quaintrelle. In December 2024, the restaurant announced plans to close permanently on January 1, 2025, after New Year's Eve dinner and celebrations. Michael Russell included Quaintrelle in The Oregonian's list of the 21 "most painful" restaurant and bar closures of 2024.

Quaintrelle was replaced by the restaurant 82 Acres.

== See also ==
- List of New American restaurants
