= Maurice (restaurant) =

Restaurant in Portland, Oregon, U.S.

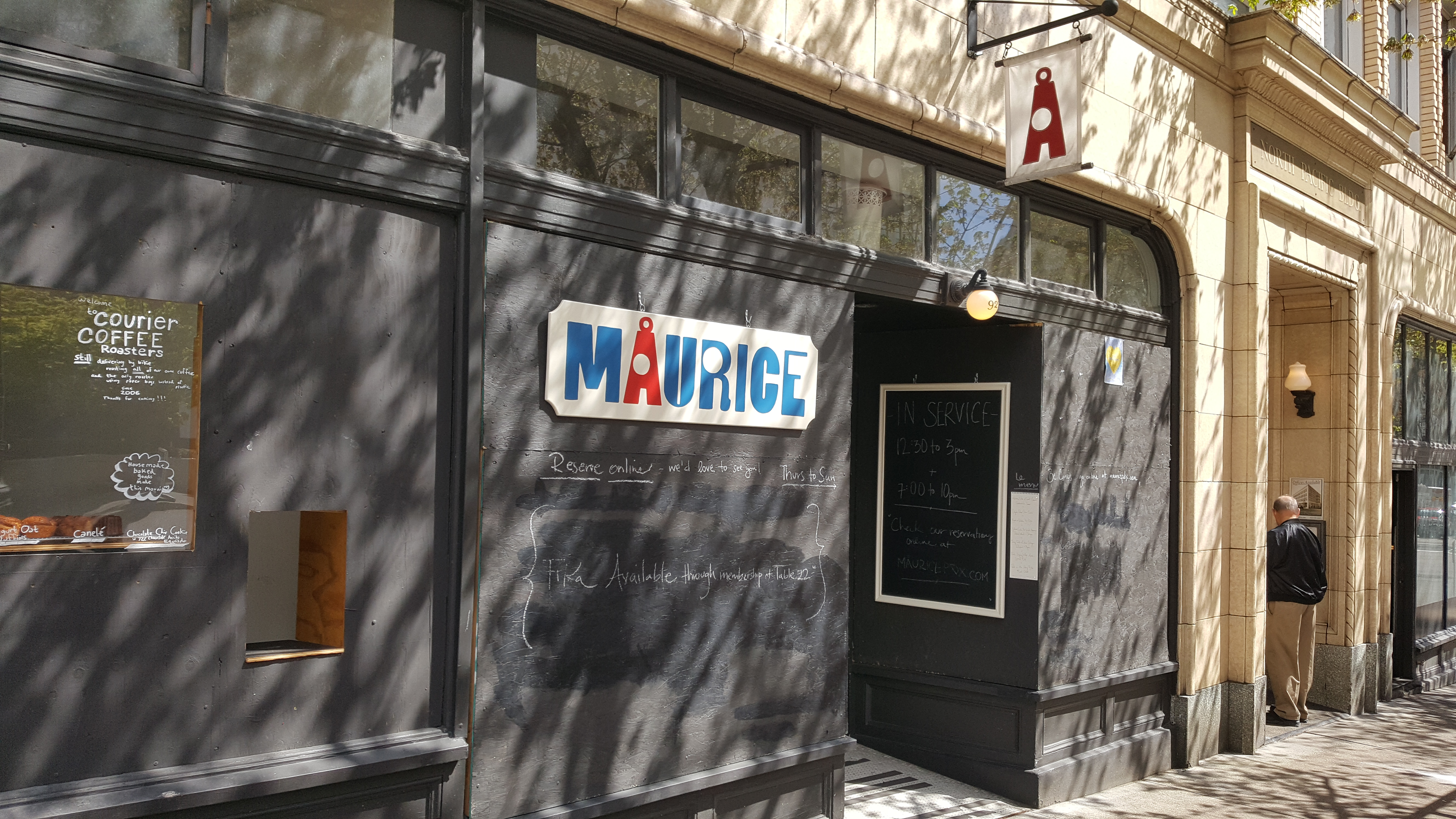
- The restaurant's exterior in 2022
- Interactive map of Maurice

Restaurant information
- Food type: French; Nordic; Scandinavian
- Location: 921 Southwest Oak Street, Portland, Multnomah, Oregon, 97205, United States
- Coordinates: 45.5227°N 122.6804°W
- Website: mauricepdx.com

Maurice (stylized as Måurice) is a restaurant in Portland, Oregon, United States. The restaurant opened in 2013.

== Description ==
The bakery and restaurant Maurice has been described as a "French-Scandinavian" and "French-Nordic" luncheonette. The menu includes goat-filled bisteeya (meat pies) and polenta clafouti with confit chicken heart. Dessert options include black pepper cheesecake, creme brulee pops, and rhubarb and celery leaf cheese.

== History ==
Kristen Murray opened in the restaurant in December 2013. She raised $40,000 via Kickstarter to support the launch. Murray launched a regular prix-fixe brunch in 2014, and Sunday brunch in 2018.

== Reception ==
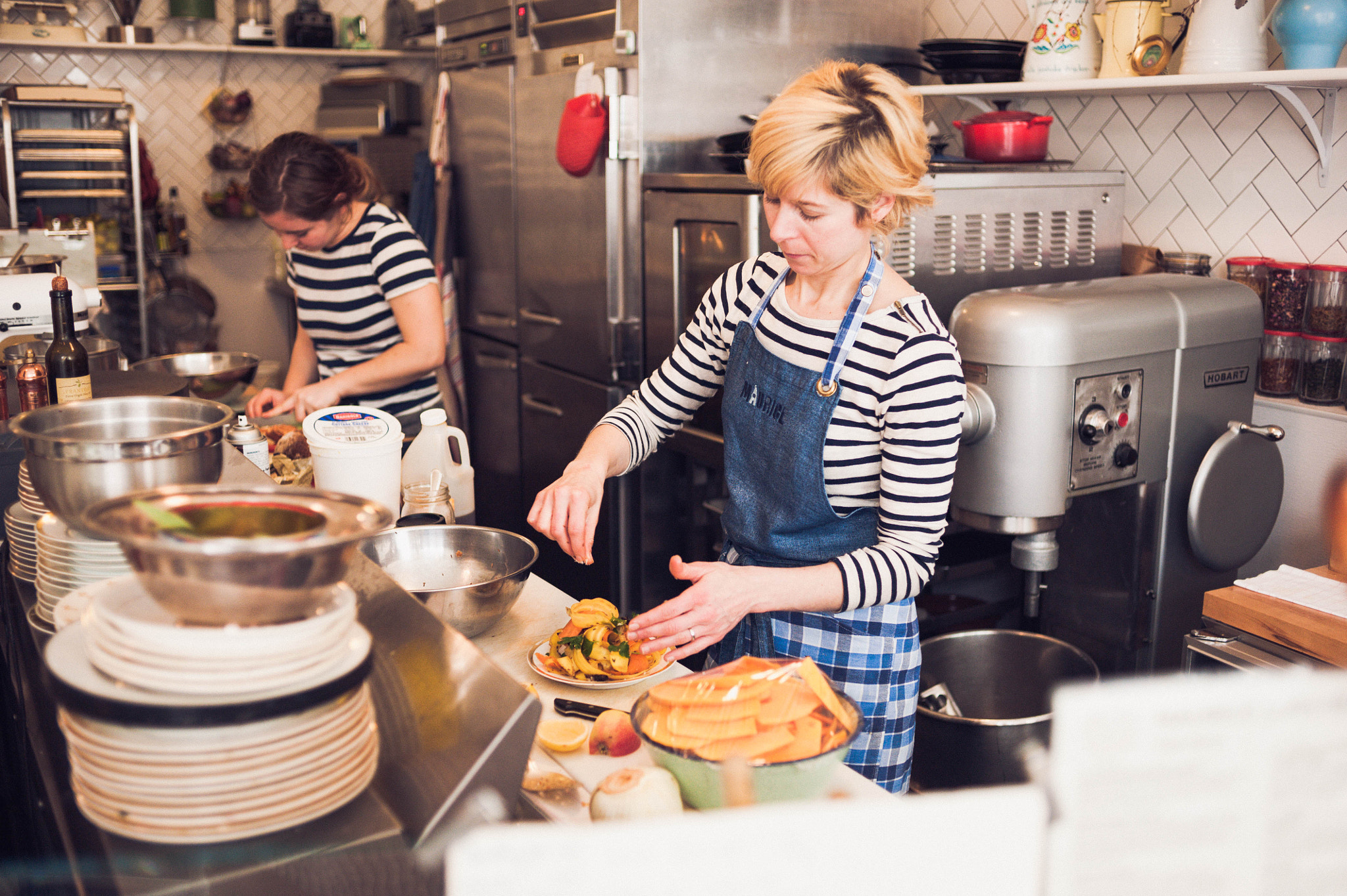
Interior

In 2014, the Portland Mercury's Andrea Damewood wrote, "This isn't your fattyboombatty Cheesecake Factory fare." The Oregonian's Michael Russell rated the restaurant 2.5 out of 3 stars. Maurice was included in Bon Appetit's "America's Best New Restaurants 2014" list, and ranked number 9 in the magazine's "Hot 10" list. In 2017, food critic Ruth Reichl called Maurice "the quintessential Portland restaurant".

Murray was nominated in the Best Chef: Northwest and Pacific category of the 2020 James Beard Awards for her work at Maurice. Michelle Lopez and Brooke Jackson-Glidden included the restaurant in Eater Portland's 2021 list of "outstanding" bakeries in the Portland metropolitan area. Alex Frane and Jackson-Glidden also included Maurice in the website's 2021 list of eleven "charming" French Restaurants in the city. Jackson-Glidden also included Maurice in the site's 2021 list of Portland's 38 "essential" restaurants and food carts. The business was included in Eater Portland's 2022 overview of recommended restaurants in downtown Portland and 2025 list of the city's best restaurants for mid-week lunches. Paolo Bicchieri included Maurice in Eater Portland's 2025 overview of the city's best restaurants for lunch.

The restaurant was also included in The Infatuation's 2024 list of Portland's best restaurants and Time Out Portland's 2025 list of the city's eighteen best restaurants. The business was included in Portland Monthly's 2025 list of 25 restaurants "that made Portland". Writers for Portland Monthly included the black pepper cheesecake in a 2025 list of the city's "most iconic" dishes.

== See also ==
- List of French restaurants
- List of Scandinavian restaurants
