= Agern =

Defunct Scandinavian restaurant in New York City

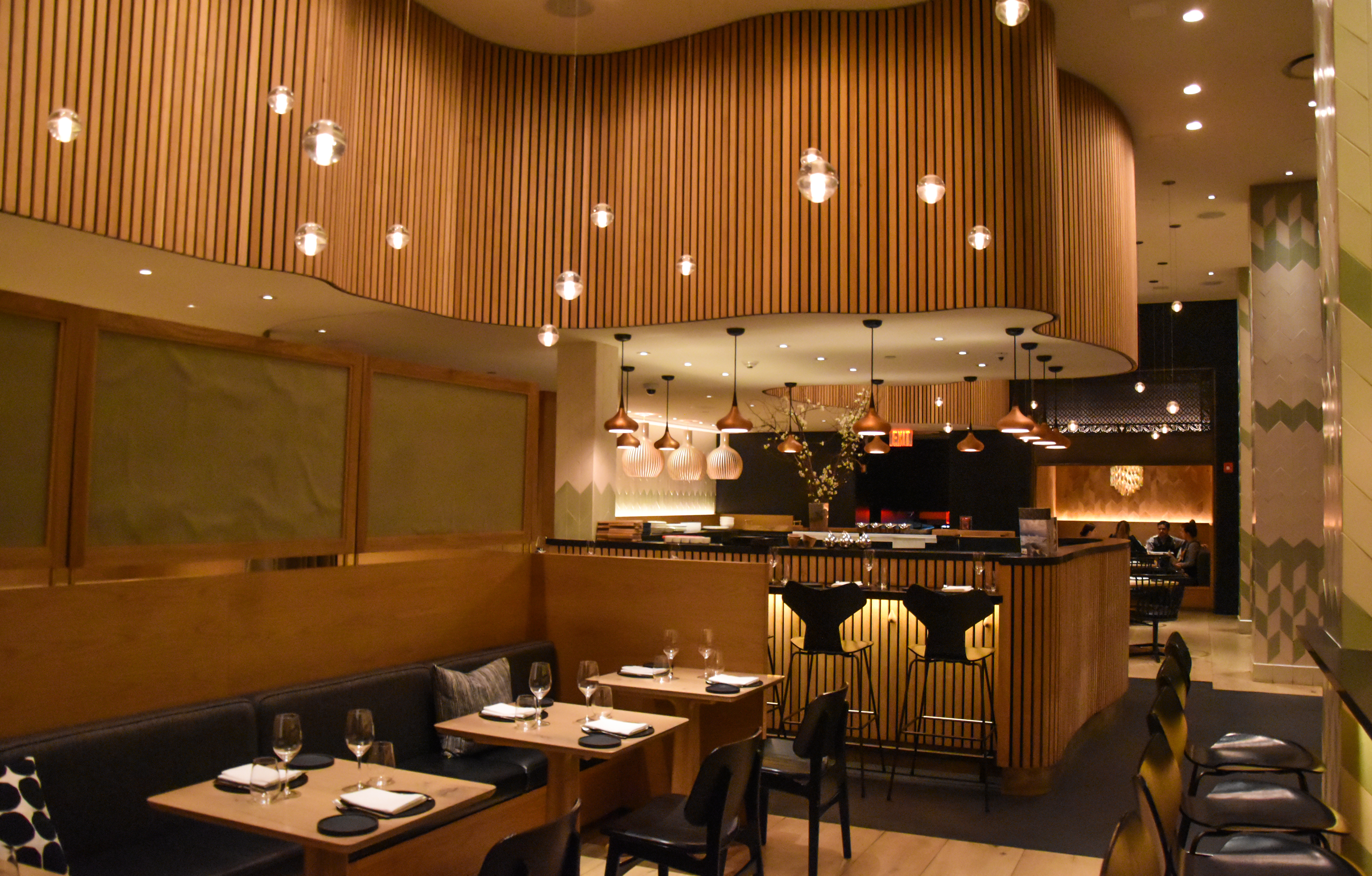
- The restaurant's interior in 2019
- Interactive map of Agern

Restaurant information
- Established: 2016
- Closed: 2020
- Food type: Scandinavian
- Location: 89 East 42nd Street, New York City, 10017
- Coordinates: 40°45′9″N 73°58′40″W

Agern was a Scandinavian restaurant in New York City. The restaurant opened in 2016 in the former men's smoking lounge of Grand Central Terminal. After Agern closed, the restaurant Cornelius began operating in the space.

== See also ==
- List of defunct restaurants of the United States
- List of Michelin-starred restaurants in New York City
- List of Scandinavian restaurants
