= Ebbe (restaurant) =

Restaurant in Tampa, Florida, U.S.

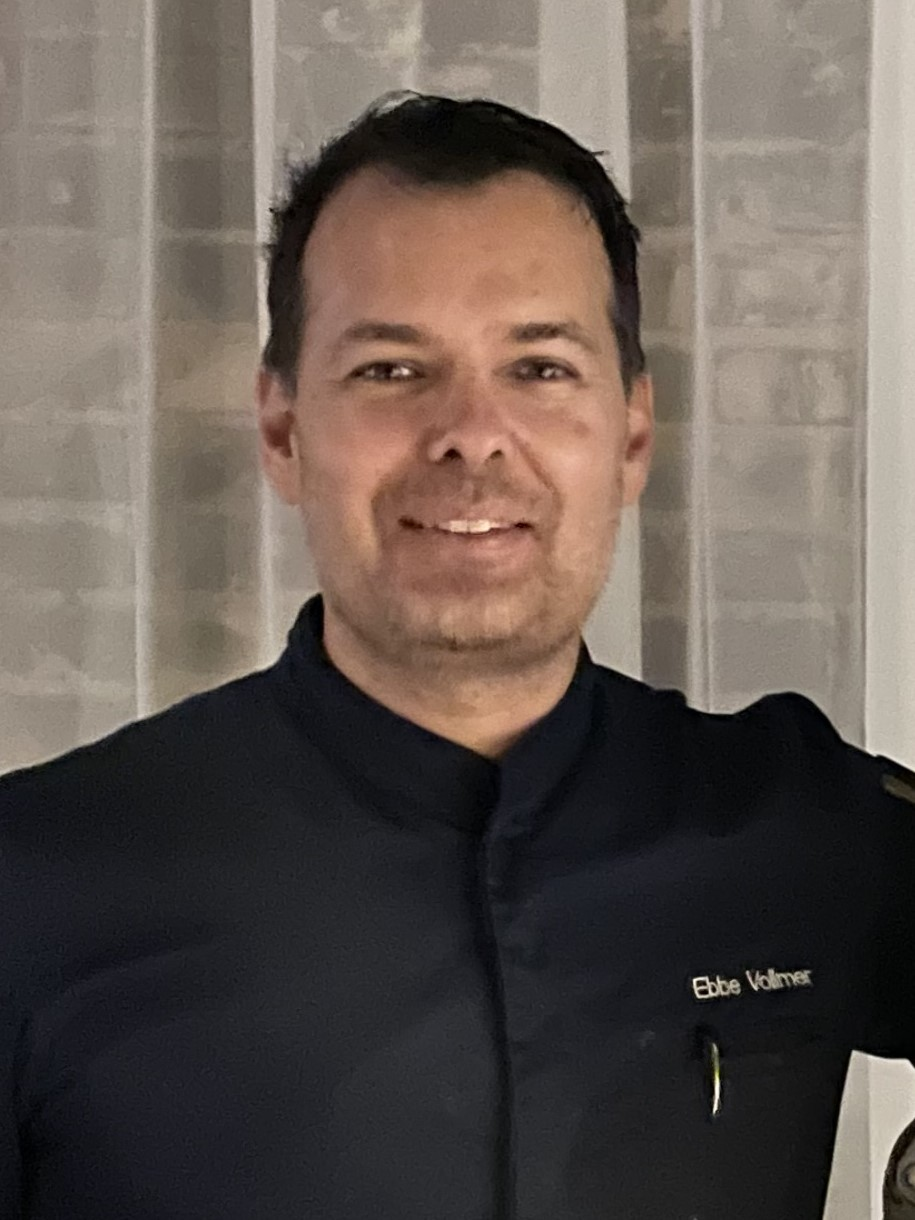
- Chef Ebbe Vollmer
- Interactive map of Ebbe

Restaurant information
- Established: May 2023
- Chef: Ebbe Vollmer
- Food type: Scandinavian
- Rating: (Michelin Guide)
- Location: 1202 North Franklin Street, Tampa, Florida, 33602, United States
- Coordinates: 27°57′13″N 82°27′37″W
- Reservations: Required
- Website: www.chefebbe.com

Ebbe is a Michelin-starred Scandinavian restaurant in Downtown Tampa, Florida, in the United States.

== Description ==
Ebbe has a seasonally rotating multi-course menu, sourcing locally where possible. The dining space comprises a U-shaped marble bar.

Head chef Ebbe Vollmer previously opened a two Michelin Star restaurant, Vollmers, with his brother in his native Malmö, Sweden. Ebbe received its Michelin star in April 2024, less than a year after opening.

Sample dishes from a Prestige Menu
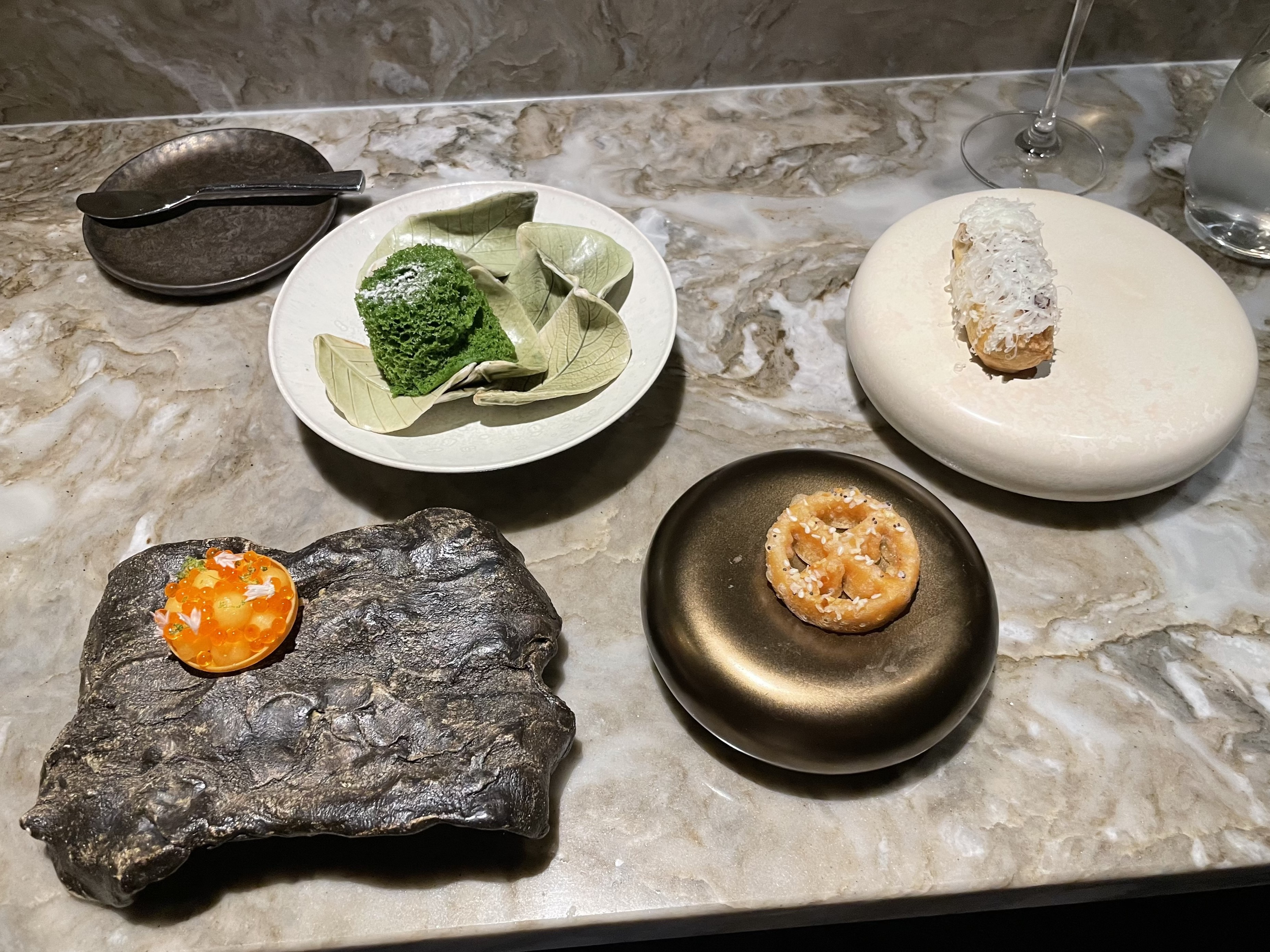
Example first course.

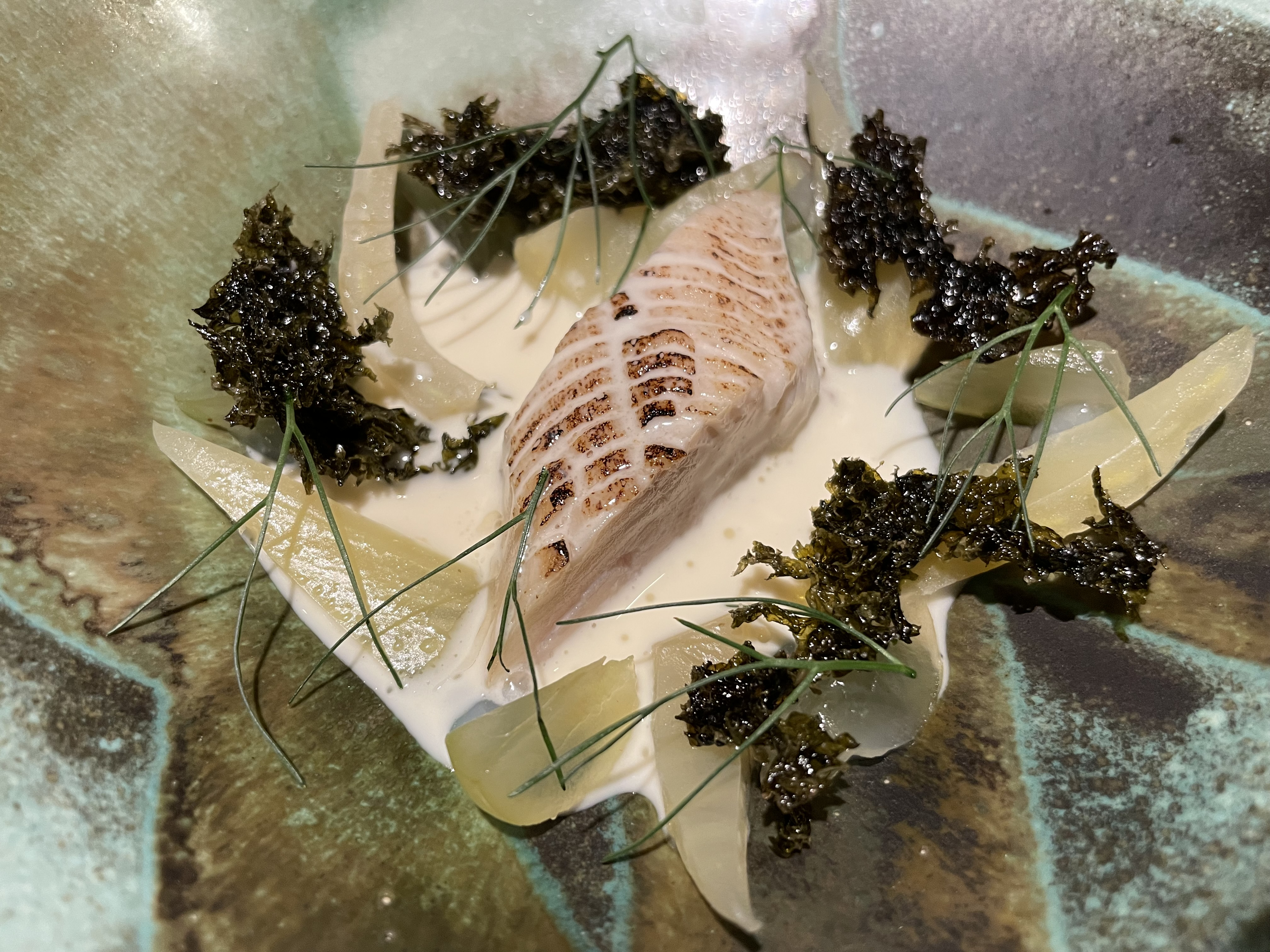
Fish course.

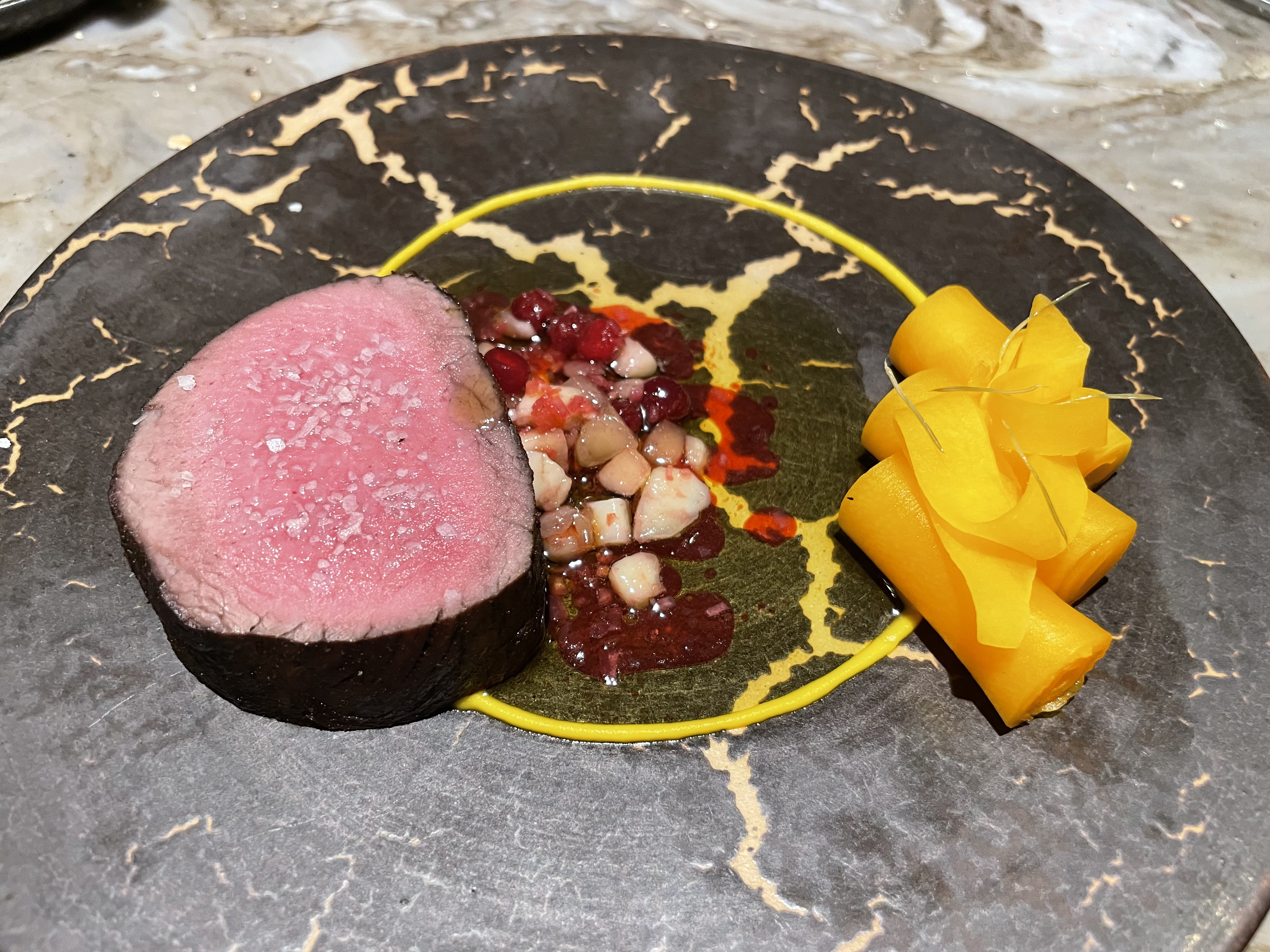
Meat course (venison, Muscat pumpkin, Arabica).

== See also ==
- List of Michelin-starred restaurants in Florida
- List of restaurants in Tampa, Florida
- List of Scandinavian restaurants
