= Gotham Tavern =

Defunct restaurant in Portland, Oregon, U.S.

- Interactive map of Gotham Tavern

Restaurant information
- Location: 2240 North Interstate Avenue, Portland, Multnomah, Oregon, United States
- Coordinates: 45°32′21″N 122°40′29″W

Gotham Tavern was a restaurant in Portland, Oregon, United States. The business operated from 2005 to 2013 in the North Portland part of the Eliot neighborhood.

== Description ==
The restaurant Gotham Tavern operated in the North Portland part of the Eliot neighborhood.

== History ==
Gotham Tavern opened in 2005. It closed in May 2013. Broder later operated in the space.
