= Harald (restaurant) =

Finnish restaurant chain

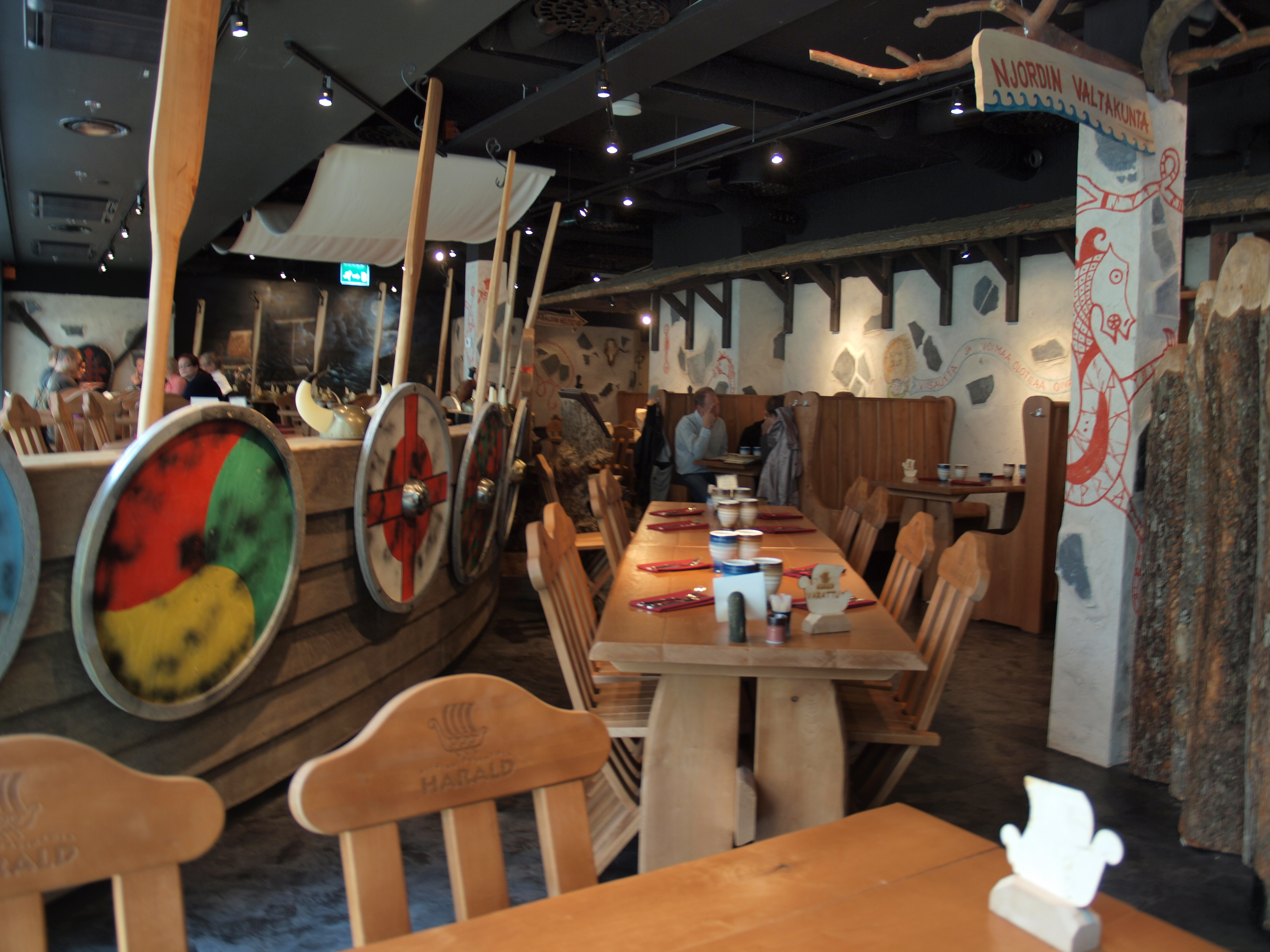
- Harald restaurant in Helsinki, 2012

Restaurant information
- Established: Tampere, 1997
- Food type: Viking
- Location: Helsinki, Finland
- Other locations: Jyväskylä, Kuopio, Lahti, Oulu, Tampere, Turku and Espoo
- Website: Official site

Harald is a chain of restaurants in Finland, specializing in a Viking-themed dining concept. Currently the chain includes eight restaurants, in Helsinki, Jyväskylä, Kuopio, Lahti, Oulu, Tampere, and Turku. The first restaurant was founded in Tampere in 1997.

== Overview ==
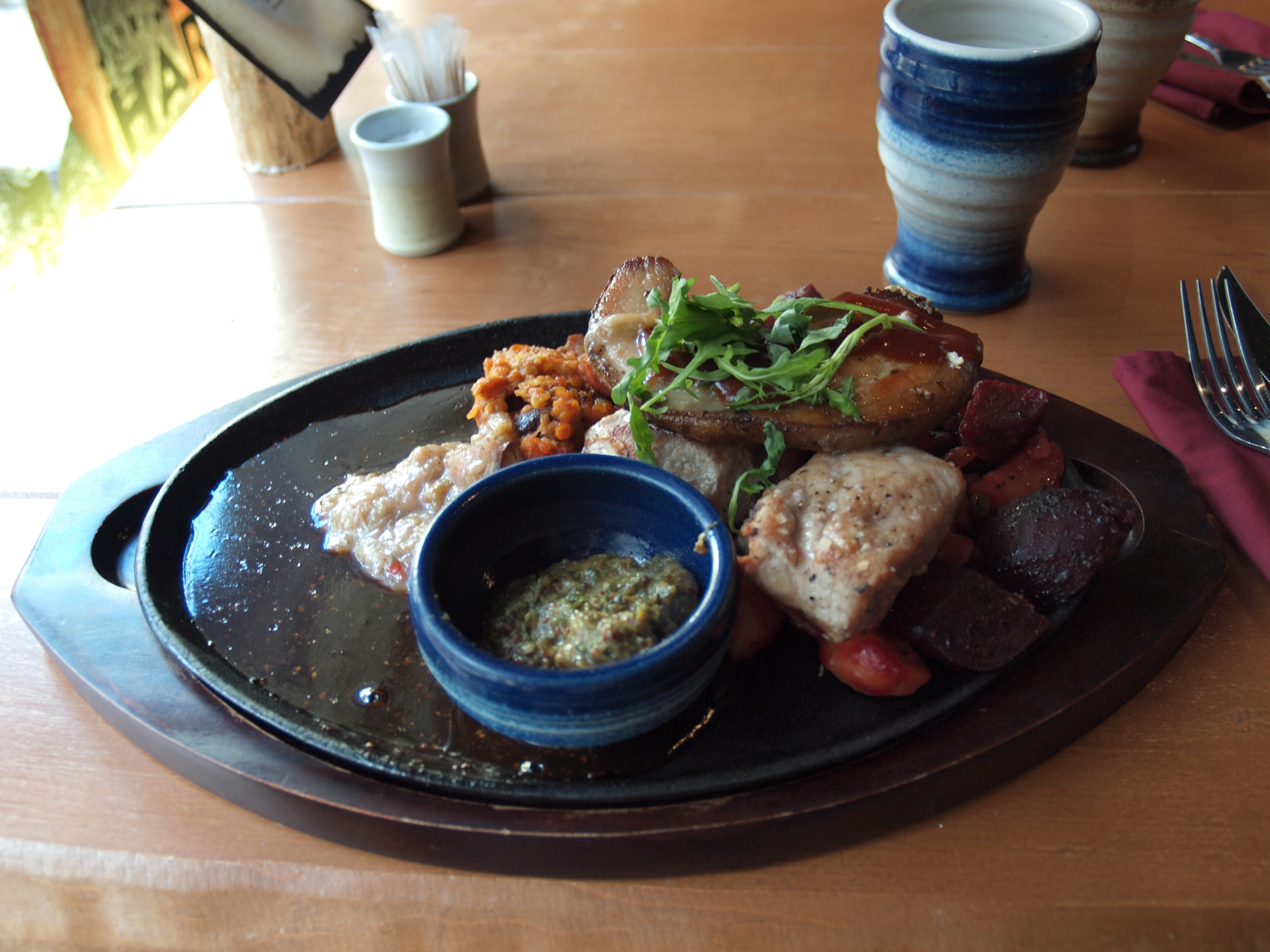
A wild boar dish at the Harald restaurant in Helsinki

The Harald restaurants are themed after the Viking Age. The menu, consisting mostly of meat and fish in various forms, accompanied with vegetables and sauces, is close to what the Vikings may have eaten, but slightly modified to suit the modern taste. The interior and the outfits of the staff also have a Viking-era look.
