= Sen Yai =

Defunct Thai restaurant in Portland, Oregon, U.S.

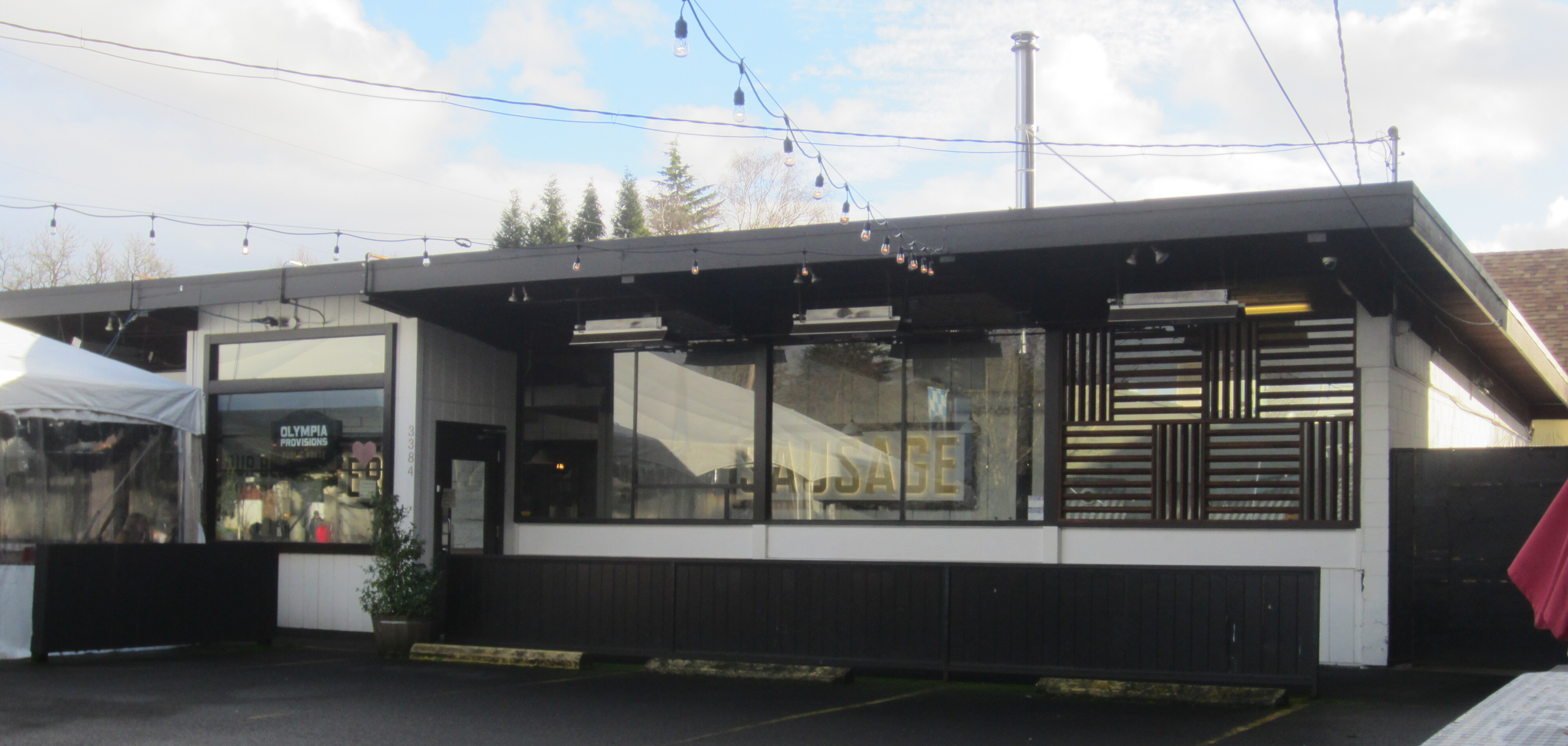
- 2021 photograph of the exterior of the building that housed Sen Yai from 2013 to 2016
- Interactive map of Sen Yai

Restaurant information
- Food type: Thai
- Location: 3384 SE Division Street, Portland, Multnomah, Oregon, United States
- Coordinates: 45.5046°N 122.6299°W

Sen Yai was a Thai restaurant in Portland, Oregon, United States. Andy Ricker opened the restaurant, which operated in southeast Portland's Richmond neighborhood from 2013 to 2016.

== Description ==
The Thai noodle house Sen Yai (which translates to "Big Noodle") operated on Division Street in southeast Portland's Richmond neighborhood. The interior had two dining rooms with a combined seating capacity of approximately 50 people. There was also a patio and an open kitchen. Sen Yai played Thai pop music. The menu included various noodle dishes, including boat noodles, Kai Kaphrao khai Dao, patangko with sangkhaya, and phat sii ew, and phat Thai thamadaa. Breakfast options included rice porridge and steamed pork buns. Thrillist described the business as "an old-school noodle house". Sunset said Sen Yai served "complex noodle dishes not typically seen in the United States—yet".

== History ==
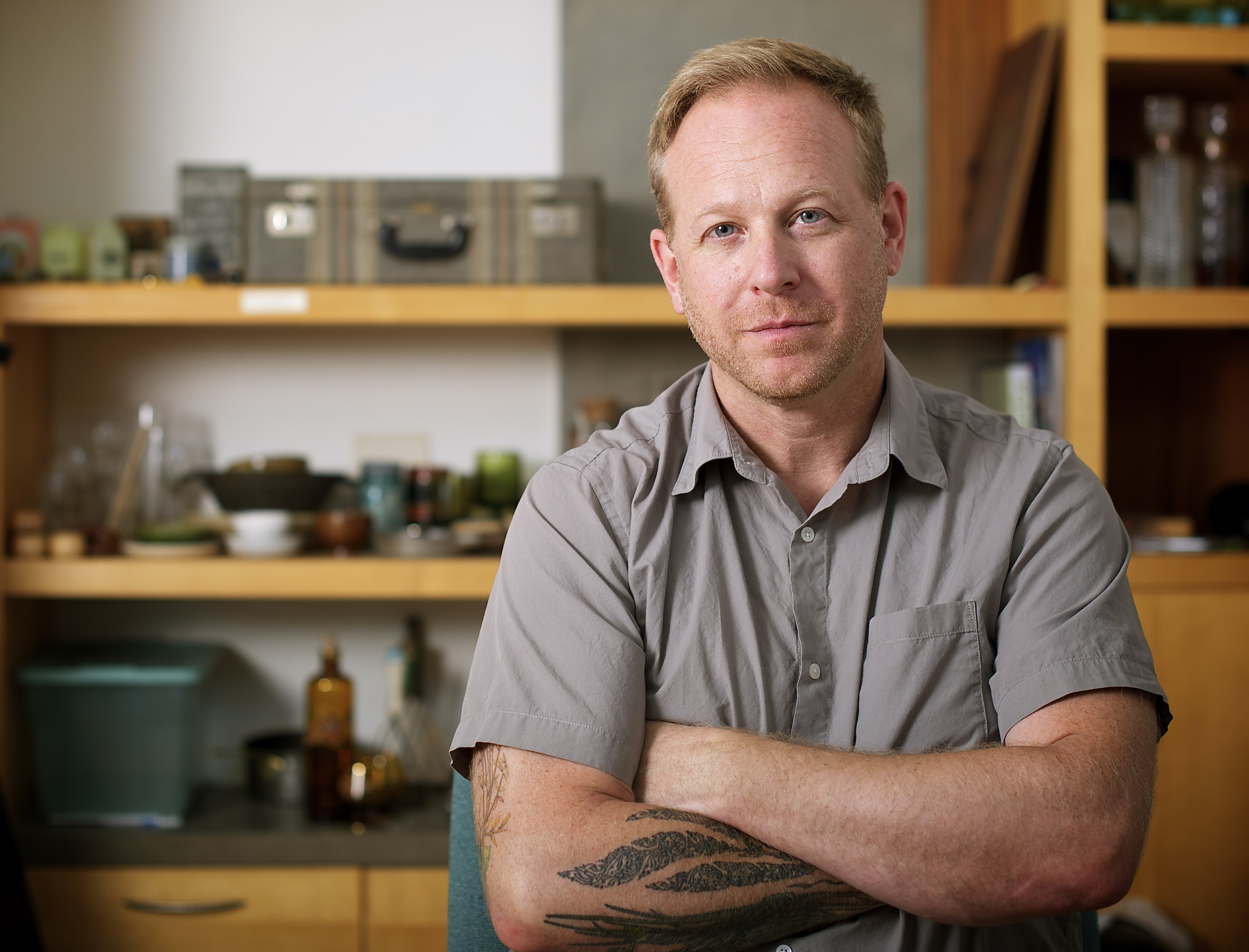
Andy Ricker, 2011

Andy Ricker opened Sen Yai in May 2013. The business was Ricker's sixth restaurant. Portland Monthly described Sen Yai as a "spin-off" of Ricker's Pok Pok.

In April 2016, the business announced plans to close permanently on May 9. Some of Sen Yai's dishes were moved to Ricker's nearby and now-defunct Whiskey Soda Lounge. The space that had housed Sen Yai was later used by the restaurants Olympia Provisions Public House and Alpenrausch (2023–2026).

== Reception ==
Karen Brooks included Sen Yai in Portland Monthly's 2013 list of the city's best new restaurants. In a 2013 review for the Portland Mercury, Chris Onstad opined, "I can see how the relatively high prices at Sen Yai will have some people grousing, especially in a town with a Thai restaurant scene this saturated. However, the difference in terms of quality of meat, intensity and cleanliness of flavor, and originality is worth it." Drew Tyson included Sen Yai in Thrillist's 2014 list of Portland's ten best noodle restaurants.

== See also ==
- List of defunct restaurants of the United States
- List of Thai restaurants
