= Ping (restaurant) =

Defunct Asian restaurant in Portland, Oregon, U.S.

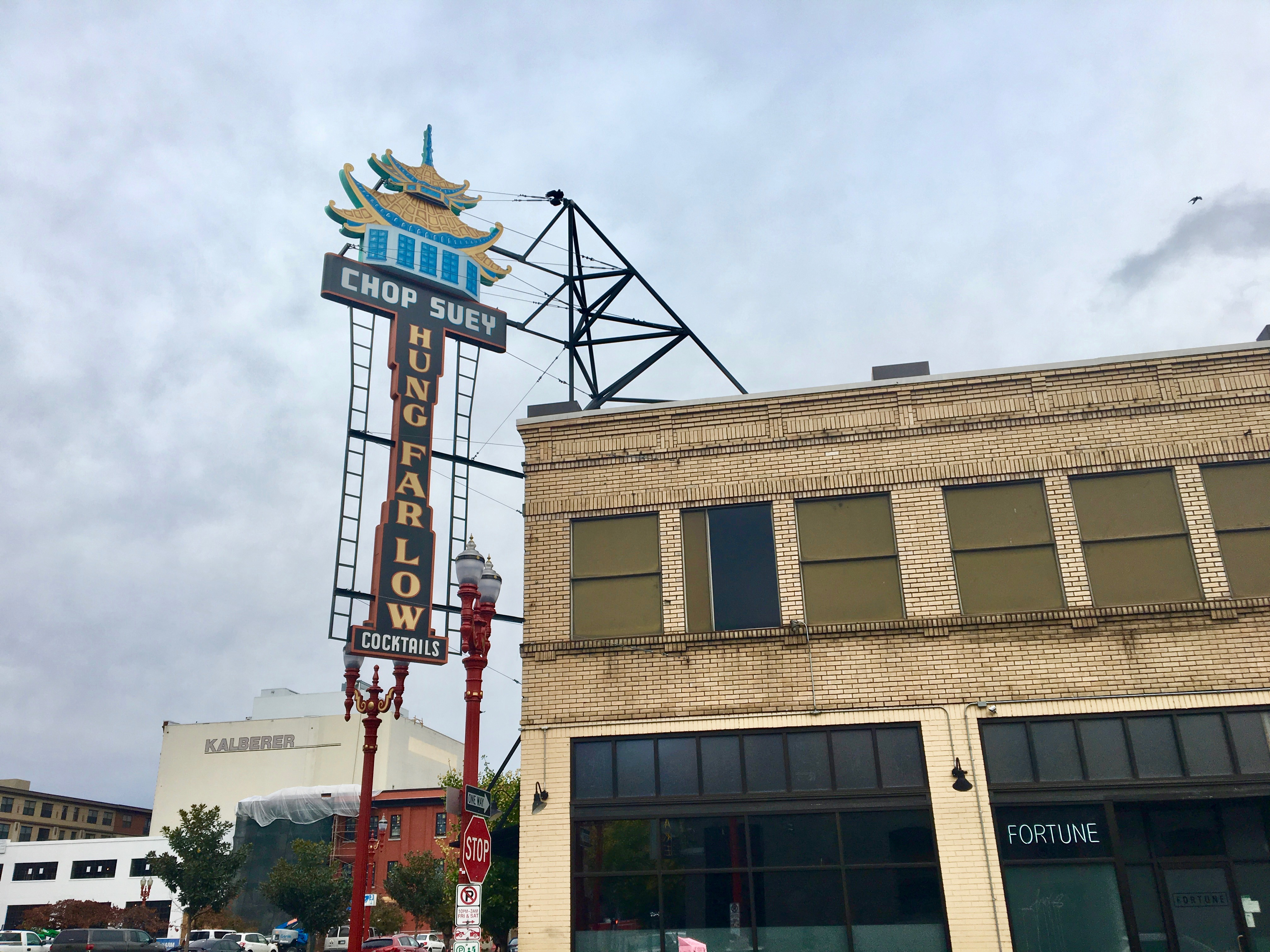
- 2016 photograph of the Old Town Chinatown building which housed Ping from 2009 to 2012
- Interactive map of Ping

Restaurant information
- Owner: Kurt Huffman
- Previous owner: Andy Ricker
- Chef: Andy Ricker; Mike Kessler
- Food type: Asian
- Location: 2131 Southeast 11th Avenue, Portland, Oregon, United States
- Coordinates: 45.50745°N 122.65495°W
- Website: http://pingpdx.com/ (2009–2012) https://pingportland.com/ (2020–2021)

Ping was an Asian restaurant in Portland, Oregon. Chef Andy Ricker and restaurateur Kurt Huffman opened the original restaurant in Old Town Chinatown in 2009. In 2010, Ping was a semifinalist in the Best New Restaurant category at the James Beard Foundation Awards. It was also named a best new restaurant by GQ and earned a Rising Star award from The Oregonian.

Despite garnering a positive reception, the restaurant closed temporarily in 2012 and permanently in 2013. Huffman reopened Ping in southeast Portland's Hosford-Abernethy neighborhood in late 2020, during the COVID-19 pandemic, with Mike Kessler as chef. The take-out operation closed in 2021.

== Description ==
Ping originally operated in Portland's Old Town Chinatown neighborhood. The interior had "floor-to-ceiling windows, revealing vibrant Asian pop art-lined tables and white paper scrolls hanging from the ceiling over the open kitchen". Ping served Thai and Vietnamese street food. Eat Ink described Ping as "a pub-like space with an Asian fusion menu"; other outlets called Ping a "Thai izakaya". The New York Times called Ping a "pan-Asian skewer house".

In 2009, Portland Monthly's Martha Calhood said the "Pan-Asian [pub's] aesthetic seems right at home on this gritty corner in Chinatown" and wrote, "even as happy hour fades with the spring twilight, an assortment of diners—Pearl District businessmen, pipe-cleaner-skinny fashionistas, couples, families, perfectly unkempt twentysomethings—steadily stream in, talking and pushing tables together near the restaurant's large front windows".

=== Menu ===
The menu has also been described as "Asian-style pub food", and has included Laksa (chicken breast, fishcake, clams, prawns and boiled egg with rice noodles in a mild curry coconut milk base and sambal), friend pork knuckles, stewed duck leg, skewers, and quail eggs wrapped in bacon. Ping's "signature" drink was the Sapporo lager with sugar and yuzu.

When Ping relaunched in 2020, the menu included salads, meats, noodles, skewers, and vegetables. According to Eater Portland's Brooke Jackson-Glidden, "The skewers [ranged] from soy-and-yuzu-marinated pork belly to the Thai pork dish mu ping, as well as its popular Japanese chicken thigh yakitori. The noodles, on the other hand, generally [stuck] to Southeast Asia, with Singaporean laksa nonya and Hokkien mee, to Thai suki haeng, a stir-fried glass noodle dish with vegetables".

== History ==
=== Original restaurant ===
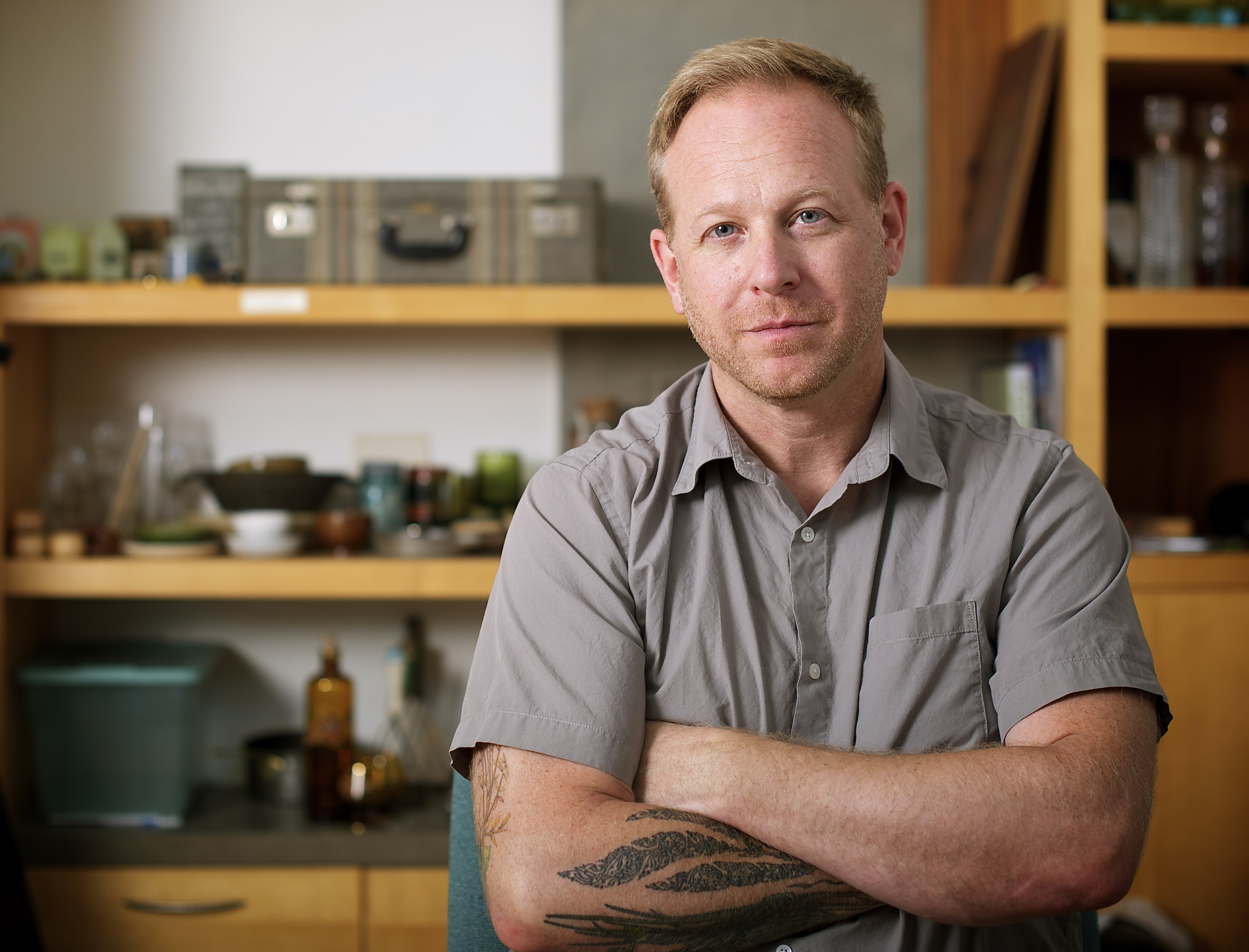
Chef Andy Ricker in 2011

Chef Andy Ricker and restaurateur Kurt Huffman (via ChefStable) opened the original Ping in early 2009, in the space previously occupied by Hung Far Low. According to Michael Russell of The Oregoninan, "At first, chef Andy Ricker had explored the possibility of taking over the sprawling upstairs space long home to Hung Far Low... Working with partners Kurt Huffman of restaurant group ChefStable as well as Wieden & Kennedy executive creative director (and longtime Chinatown booster) John Jay and his wife, style consultant Janet, Ricker eventually settled on a smaller space downstairs."

According to Eat Ink, Ping "made many food critics' 'must try' lists" but Ricker "sold his interest ... to his partners to focus exclusively on Thai cuisine". The restaurant closed in temporarily in 2012 and permanently in 2013, following an economic downturn and Ricker's departure. According to Eater Portland, "The spot went through numerous iterations, including stints as hip cocktail bar Easy Company, the more casual watering hole Big Trouble, and as the commissary kitchen for the popular, pork-heavy sandwich shop Lardo, part of Huffman's now citywide restaurant group ChefStable".

=== Relaunch ===
Eight years later, in December 2020, Huffman reopened Ping during the COVID-19 pandemic as a "takeout-and-delivery-only concept" alongside Mike Kessler, a chef who had worked in the original restaurant's kitchen. Ping reopened in southeast Portland's Hosford-Abernethy neighborhood, in a space which previously housed Holdfast Dining. Willamette Week described the operation as a "takeout-only ghost kitchen". Kessler shared plans to "introduce outdoor dining, before bringing seating indoors as vaccination rates go up", and eventually return to a brick and mortar operation. He told KATU, "finding new ways of doing business is the only way to stay afloat right now".

The second iteration of Ping was even shorter-lived; by mid-2021 the restaurant declared a hiatus on its Instagram account, from which it did not return. Its last post was dated July 17, 2021. By December 2021 its website was inaccessible.

== Reception ==
In 2010, Ping was nominated in the Best New Restaurant category at the James Beard Foundation Awards. The restaurant was also included in Alan Richman's list of 10 best new restaurants in the United States. In his 2010 review for Willamette Week, Ben Waterhouse wrote:

Any diners refusing a beer will regret their decision a few bites into the lime-and-chile-marinated baby octopus skewer or the chile-dappled yam mama ramen salad. The capsaicin-averse should stick to sweeter bites like the salapao, a steamed bun stuffed with sweet pork, or the pork meatball skewer. Don't care for meat? Ping doesn't offer a lot for vegetarians, but don't worry—the salty-sweet-smoky shishito chile skewer is the best item on the menu. I could eat hundreds of these things.

Waterhouse said the "ideal meal" at Ping was "four hishito skewers, octopus skewer, Vietnamese-style short rib, salapao, Japanese cucumber salad". Aaron Mesh of Willamette Week wrote in 2011: "It is blasphemy to suggest that any establishment surpasses Pok Pok for Asian cuisine, but I'll go ahead and say it: Andy Ricker's second restaurant, Ping, is more ambitious and even better than its older, more popular sister." Mike Hodgkinson included Ping in The Guardian's 2011 list of Portland's "top 10 places to eat". He said the restaurant was "based on a reimagined, composite version of the Asian cafe/pub hangout scene ... and it works really well. The space has a Blade Runner-esque food stall energy, and strikes a balance between comfort and artful design. The baby octopus skewers in lime/chilli marinade are a highlight." Spectrum Culture's Cedric Justic wrote a positive review of the restaurant in 2012. He said "Ping celebrates Thai food and is utterly authentic about what it doles out" and recommended, "for something special or for a tasty, light meal, you can count on [Ping's] innovative approach to Thai".

Food Republic included Ping in a list of 5 "great places to eat" in Portland. The website's review said the Kobayashi dog was "outstanding" and ended, "besides the drinking vinegar weirdness and a lame pork chop bun, this was yet again a big win from Ricker". In 2020, Michael Russell of The Oregonian wrote, "Ping was a cult favorite, earning a GQ Best New Restaurant nod, The Oregonian's Rising Star award in 2009 and enough fans that I still hear from people who lament its closure."
