= Hung Far Low (restaurant) =

Defunct Chinese restaurant in Portland, Oregon, US

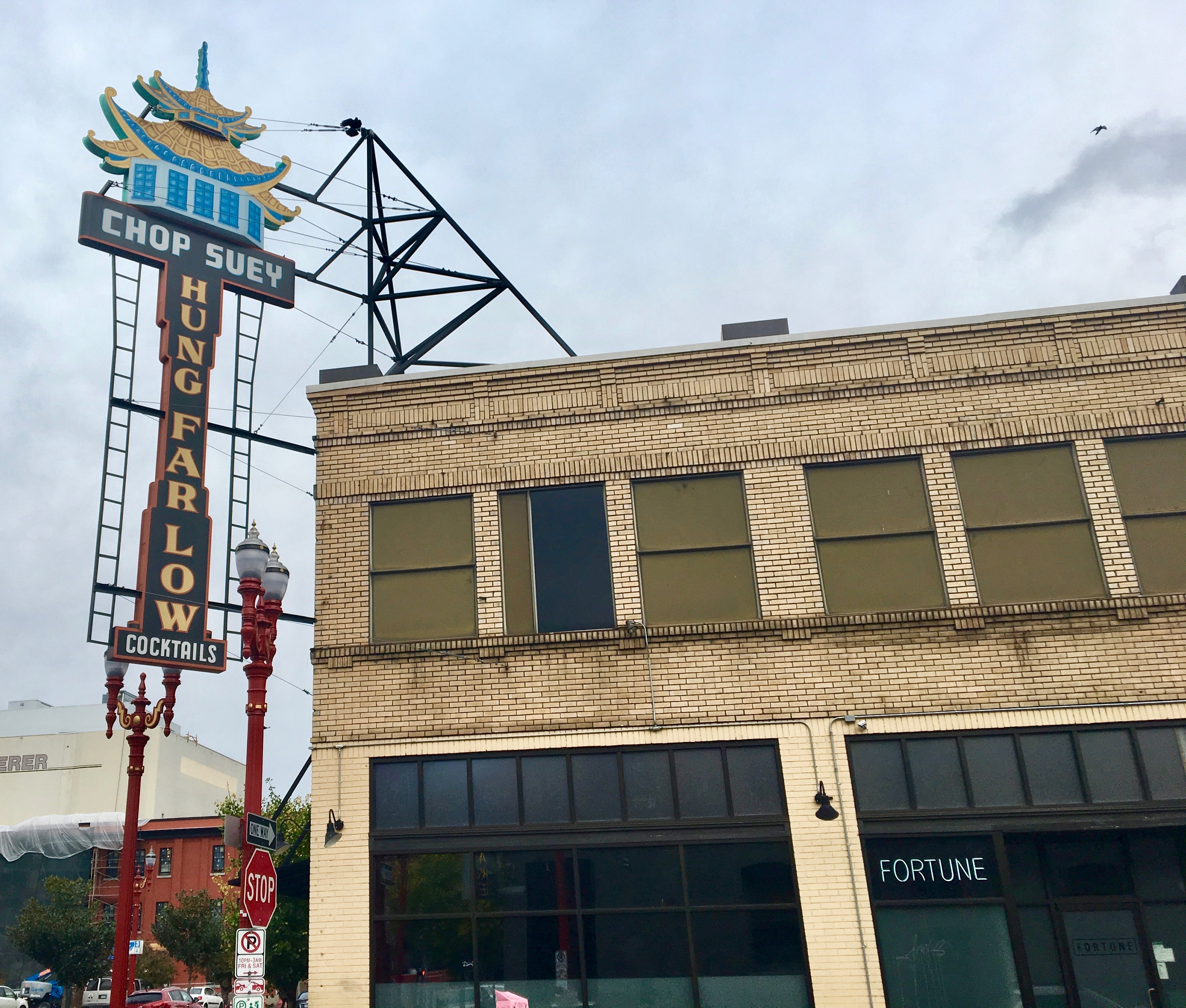
- The building that housed the original restaurant and its restored signage in 2016
- Interactive map of Hung Far Low

Restaurant information
- Established: 1928; 98 years ago
- Closed: 2015; 11 years ago
- Food type: Chinese
- Location: 112 Northwest 4th Avenue (1928–2005); 2410 Southeast 82nd Avenue (2005–2015), Portland, Oregon, Multnomah, Oregon, United States
- Coordinates: 45°30′18″N 122°34′42″W

Hung Far Low was a Chinese restaurant in Portland, Oregon, United States. It opened in the northwest Portland part of the Old Town Chinatown neighborhood in 1928 and relocated to the southeast Portland part of the Montavilla neighborhood in 2005, before closing permanently in 2015. The restaurant's decorative sign in Old Town Chinatown has become a landmark.

== History ==
The Chinese restaurant Hung Far Low, which means "red flower restaurant" in Cantonese or "almond blossom fragrance" in the Taishanese dialect, was established in 1928 and housed in a building completed in 1916. Located at 112 Northwest 4th Avenue in Portland's Old Town Chinatown neighborhood, the restaurant was owned by Wong On and open from lunch to early morning. In 1938, the restaurant's proprietor, Jack Wong, purchased the building from the Stubbs family. According to the National Park Service, the Wong family still owns the building today. In her 2013 book Walking Portland: 30 Tours of Stumptown's Funky Neighborhoods, Historic Landmarks, Park Trails, Farmers Markets, and Brewpubs, Becky Ohlsen said of the restaurant: "Dedicated barflies adored Hung Far Low for the minuscule corner bar, dark as night, with its tiny, cheap, and powerful drinks, impassive bartenders, glowing Buddha statue, and perilously long, narrow staircase that led up from the street."

In 2005, the restaurant relocated to 2410 Southeast 82nd Avenue, at the intersection of 82nd Avenue and Division Street in the Montavilla neighborhood, because of the Portland Development Commission's urban renewal plans, construction interferences, and increasing rent costs. Sarah Mirk and Denis Theriault of The Portland Mercury said the restaurant "[occupied] a squat building with a large parking lot and a bland rectangular sign within view of two other Chinese restaurants and two Asian markets". Hung Far Low was open from 11am to 11pm, Sunday through Thursday, and from 11am to 11:30pm on Fridays and Saturdays. Happy hour was available from 1–4pm, Monday through Friday. The restaurant closed in 2015.

American chemist Kenneth Koe washed dishes at Hung Far Low while attending Reed College.

=== Sign ===
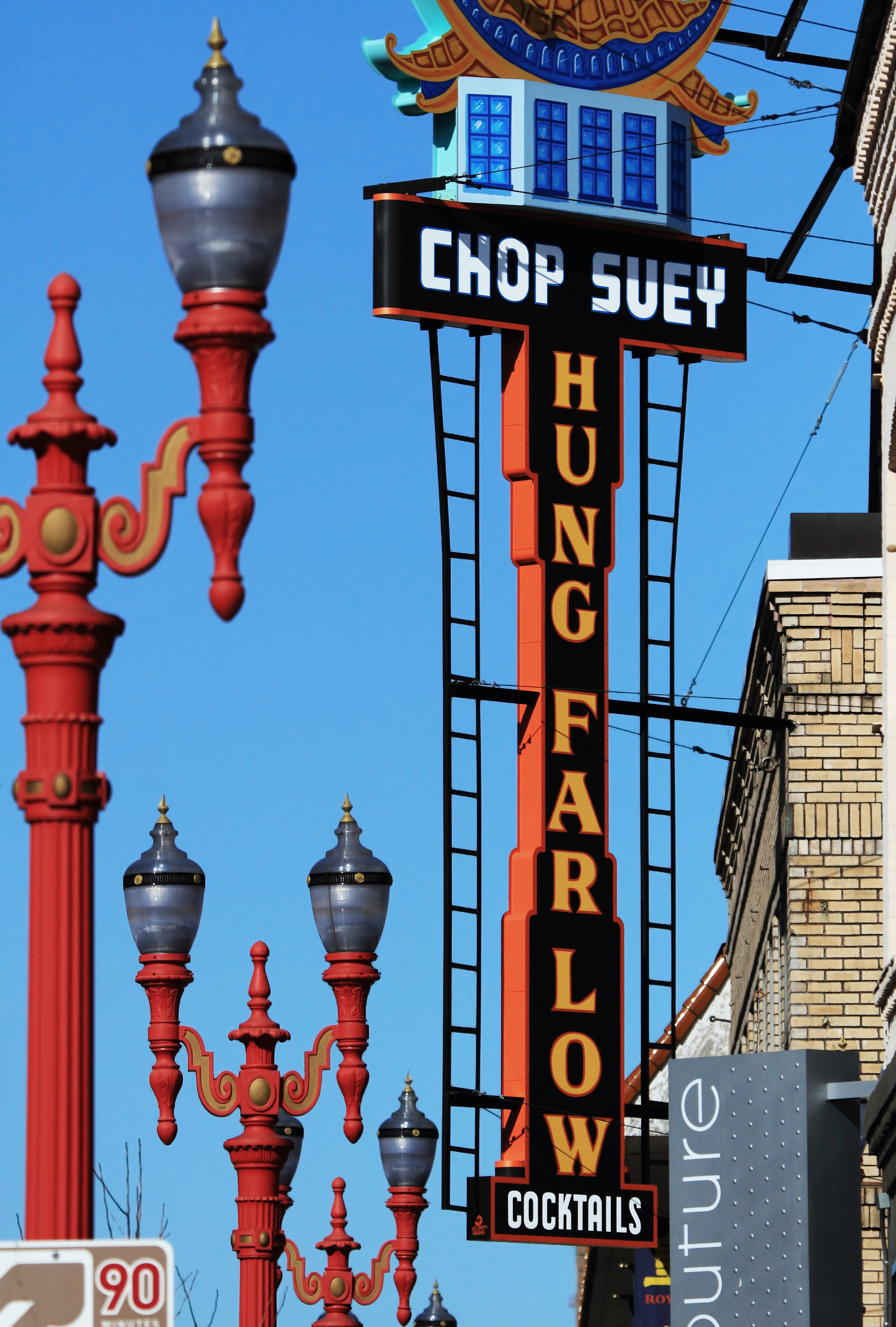
The restaurant's renovated sign in 2011

The restaurant erected a large advertisement, which became known as the "Hung Far Low sign" (or the "Chop Suey Hung Far Low Cocktails" sign, based on its displayed text), as early as 1928. The two-story, 2,000-pound (910 kg) sign and its supports were severely damaged by the 2000s. In 2008, the display was removed during building renovations and for safety reasons, and put into storage at a sign repository in Scappoose, Oregon. Local residents organized a campaign to save the advertisement, and Kurt Huffman and Andy Ricker, the restaurateurs who opened Ping when Hung Far Low relocated, worked to keep the sign because of its popularity.

In 2010, Security Signs restored the sign, which now hangs at the intersection of Northwest Fourth Avenue and Couch Street. The restoration cost $77,000 (equivalent to $114,000 in 2025), $45,000 of which was paid for by the Portland Development Commission. An additional $8,600 was raised from T-shirt sales and other fundraisers, and the Old Town Chinatown Business Association and neighborhood businesses also supported renovation efforts. The neon sign's pagoda top and bottom half were salvaged, and the rest of the structure was crafted from aluminum. The pieces were welded together, sanded, then covered with a zinc-based primer and multiple layers of acrylic polyurethane paint. The sign's treatment has an estimated lifespan of 50 years.

Huffman unveiled the restored advertisement at a dedication ceremony on September 2, 2010, during the "First Thursday" art series. The event was attended by Bruce Wong, whose grandfather erected the sign. Reporting on the display's rededication, Mirk and Theriault wrote, "... for all the talk of history on Thursday—very personal history for the Wong family—it was also clear that the sign doesn't really represent Chinatown anymore. If anything, it represents how Portland's official Chinatown has become home to few Chinese citizens or businesses." Daily Journal of Commerce's Daniel Savickas wrote, "Earlier this month the Portland Development Commission spent $45,000 in grant money to restore and re-hang the Hung Far Low sign. Yes, the sign is fun, but it's not $45,000 fun. For $45,000, the sign needs to pour me free drinks and tell me jokes."

The sign has been called a "Classic Chinese gaffe", an icon, and "unforgettable", as well as a "conversation piece, a landmark, and a testament to Chinese-American history". It has been included in at least one published walking tour of Old Town Chinatown.

== See also ==
- History of Chinese Americans in Portland, Oregon
- List of Chinese restaurants
- Portland sign
