= Austin Bush =

American writer and photographer

- Education: University of Oregon (BA); Chiang Mai University
- Website: austinbushphotography.com

Austin Bush is an American writer and photographer, based in Lisbon. Formerly based in Bangkok, Bush lived in Thailand for over 20 years and has been published in National Geographic, the BBC, Lucky Peach, and Lonely Planet.

== Early life and education ==
Bush studied the Thai language at and graduated from the University of Oregon with a degree in linguistics in 1999. He subsequently received a scholarship to study Thai at Chiang Mai University.

== Career ==
Bush has extensively documented regional Thai culinary culture, with a focus on the country's Northern and Southern cuisine. He published The Food of Northern Thailand in 2018. The Food of Northern Thailand was a 2019 James Beard Foundation Book Awards finalist and shortlisted for the 2019 Art of Eating Prize. Bush published The Food of Southern Thailand in 2024, the first English language cookbook on Southern Thai cuisine. The book additionally focuses on the farmers and fishers that produce the region's ingredients, including stink beans, palm sugar, and coconuts.

Bush and photographer Christopher Wise created Fantastic Food Search in 2019, an interactive series of food maps for Southeast Asian cities.

Bush has collaborated with chef Andy Ricker to photograph his Pok Pok books: Pok Pok, The Drinking Food of Thailand and Pok Pok Noodles.

== Books ==
- The Food of Northern Thailand (2018)
- The Food of Southern Thailand (2024)
