= List of Indonesian restaurants =

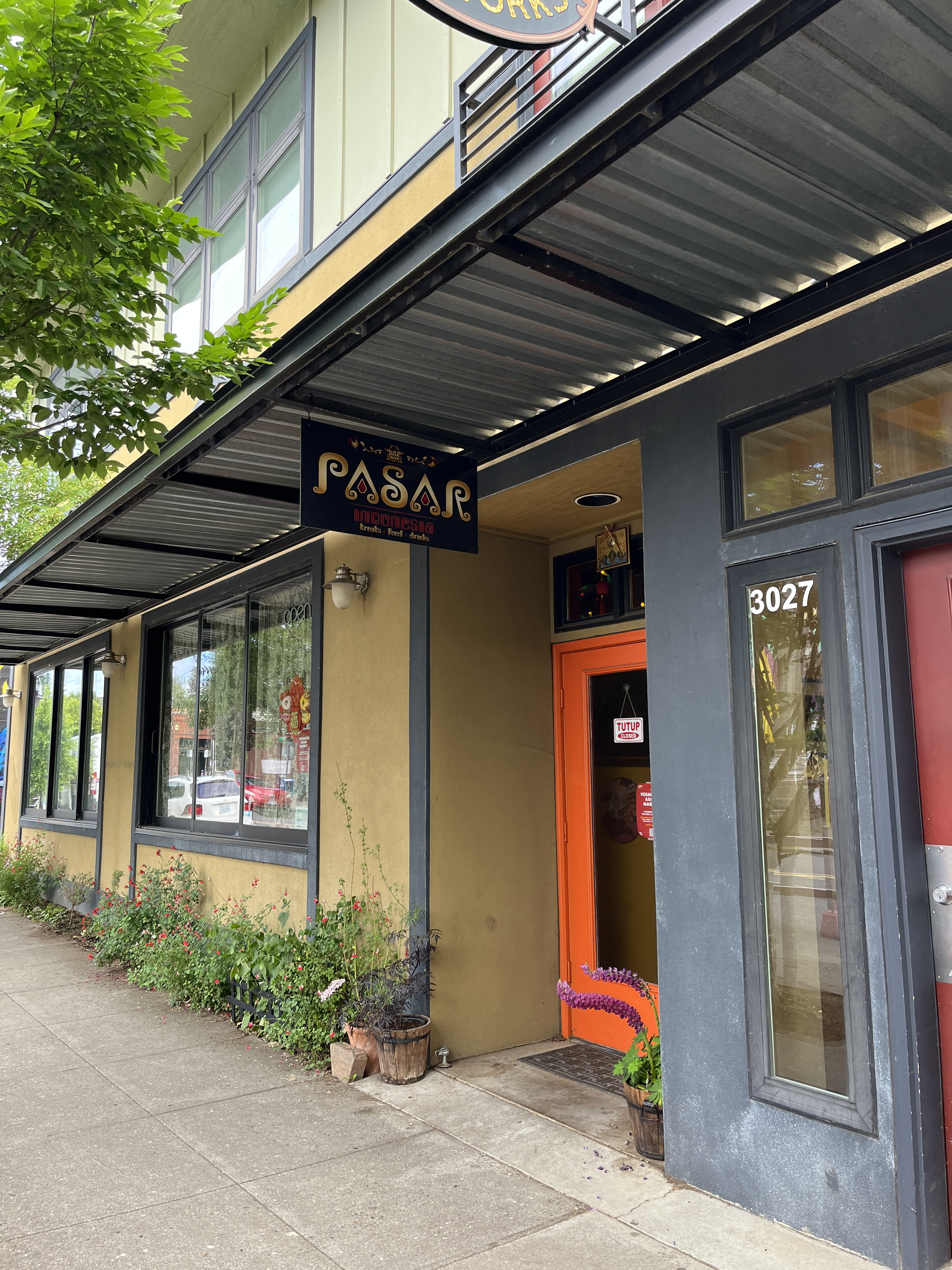
Pasar

Following is a list of notable restaurants known for serving Indonesian cuisine:

- Gado Gado, Portland, Oregon
- Oma's Hideaway, Portland, Oregon
- Pasar, Portland, Oregon
- Wajan, Portland, Oregon

== See also ==
- List of Indonesian dishes
