= Wajan =

Indonesian restaurant in Portland, Oregon, U.S.

- Interactive map of Wajan

Restaurant information
- Owners: Feny Lim; Ross Grimes
- Chef: Feny Lim
- Food type: Indonesian
- Location: 4611 East Burnside Street, Portland, Multnomah, Oregon, 97215, United States
- Coordinates: 45.5232°N 122.6153°W
- Website: wajanpdx.com

Wajan is an Indonesian restaurant in Portland, Oregon, United States. It operates on Burnside Street in the northeast Portland part of the North Tabor neighborhood. Chef Feny Lim and business partner Ross Grimes are co-owners. The duo opened the restaurant in 2019. Wajan has garnered a positive reception and was named one of the city's fifteen best restaurants by Fodor's in 2024.

== Description ==
The Indonesian restaurant Wajan operates on Burnside Street in the northeast Portland part of the North Tabor neighborhood. The interior has murals as well as woven mats on the ceiling. One painting depicts the Jakarta Kota railway station. Another mural depicts Javanese hand puppetry. One sign in the dining room has the text "Selamat Makan", which translates to "bon appétit" or "good eating". The restaurant has a patio. Eater Portland's Brooke Jackson-Glidden has described Wajan as " a tour of Indonesia’s greatest hits, like gado gado and rendang". The menu includes banana, coconut-rice, and corn fritters as well as dishes with stir-fried pork belly and potato. Wajan also serves curry stews and shaved ice. The nasi campur has curried jackfruit with green beans, eggplant and hard-boiled egg, fried tempeh, and puffy rice cracker. The teri kacang has garlic, palm sugar, peanuts, and shallots. Willamette Week has said Wajan's menu "emphasizes multiple components on a single plate".

== History ==
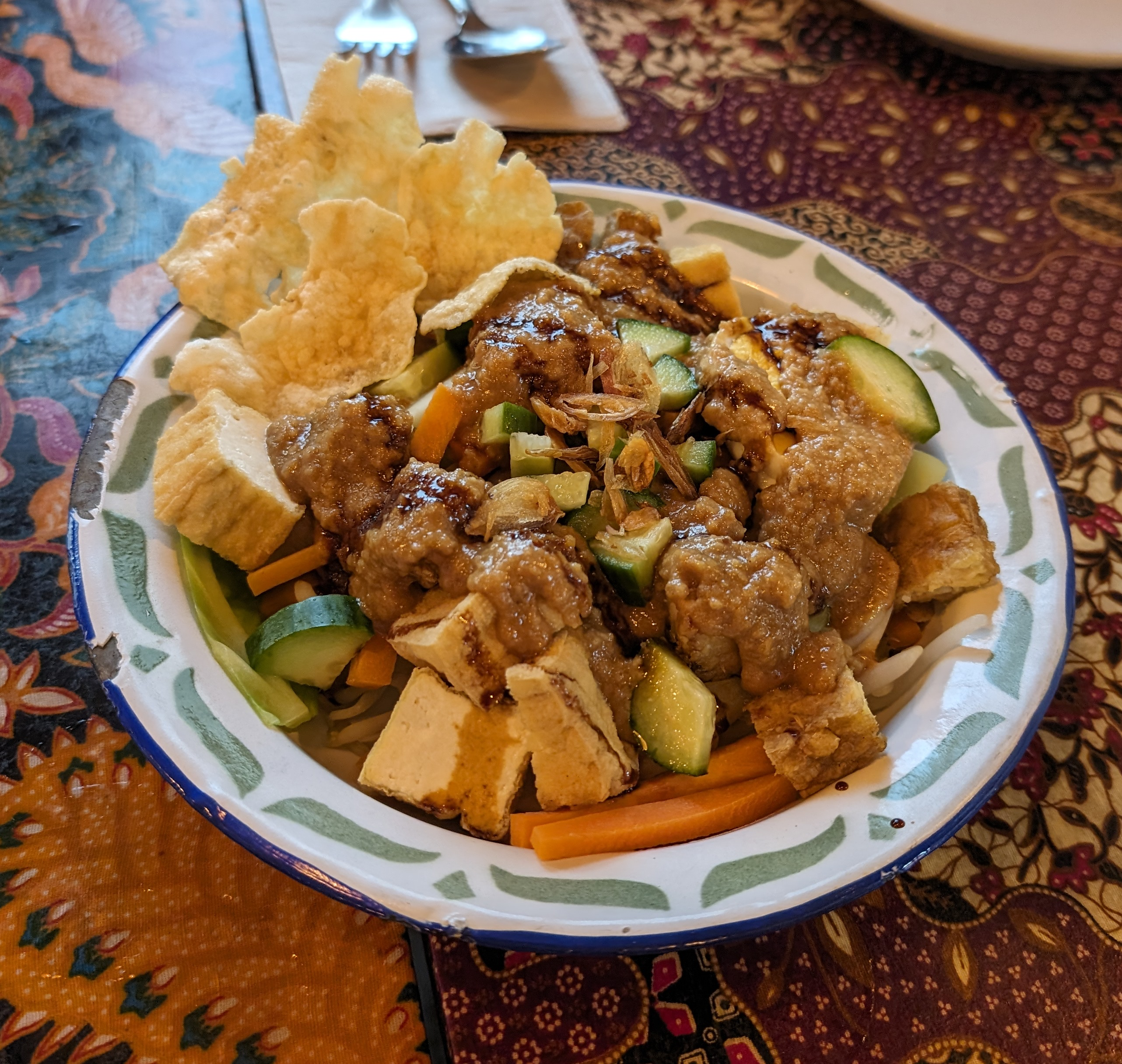
Gado-gado at Wajan

Plans for Wajan were reported by Eater Portland in December 2018. The chef and co-owner Feny Lim (or simply Feny) opened the restaurant in June 2019, in the space that previously housed Laurelhurst Cafe and Mike's Drive-In. She operates Wajan with her business partner Ross Grimes, who also manages the bar operations.

A car crashed into the patio in 2022. Two people were arrested for the incident. The business participated in Portland's first Fried Chicken Week in 2025.

Pasar has been described as a "snack-focused Indonesian spin-off" of Wajan. The two have also been described as "sister" establishments.

== Reception ==
Michael Russell included Wajan in The Oregonian's August 2019 list of Portland's 40 "most notable new restaurants of the year (so far)". Karen Brooks and other writers for Portland Monthly included the business in a 2019 list of seven restaurants "expanding Portland's food map". Kay Kingsman included Wajan in a Fodor's list of the city's fifteen best restaurants in 2024.

== See also ==
- List of Indonesian restaurants
