= Gado Gado (restaurant) =

Restaurant in Portland, Oregon, U.S.

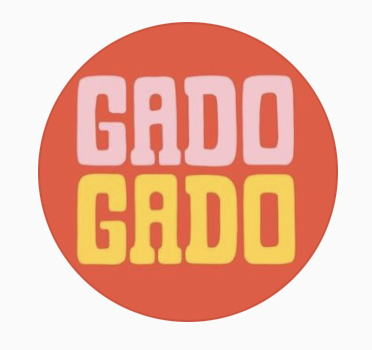

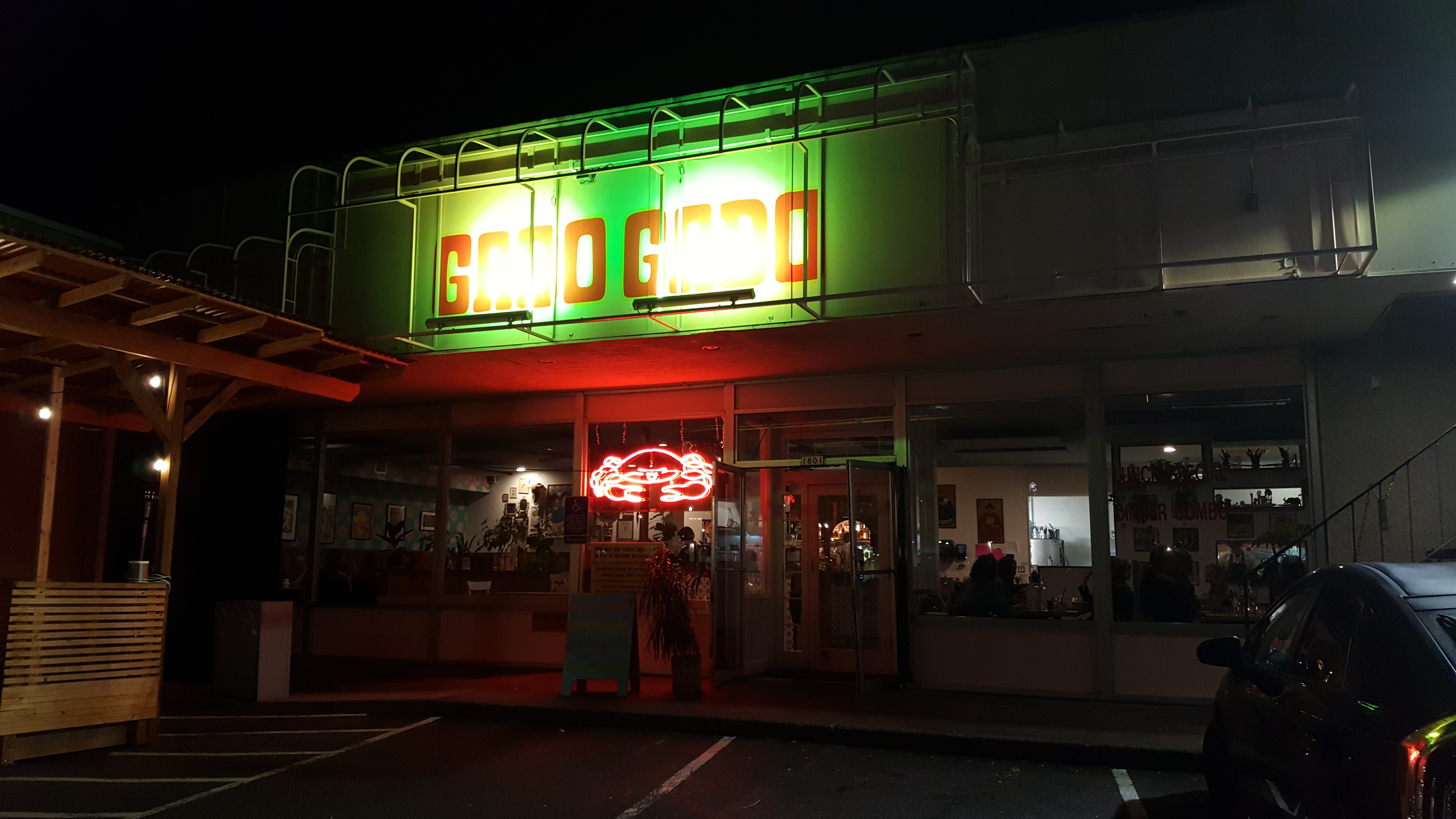
- The restaurant's exterior at night, 2021
- Interactive map of Gado Gado

Restaurant information
- Owners: Thomas Pisha-Duffly; Mariah Pisha-Duffly
- Food type: Indonesian; Chinese
- Location: 1801 Northeast Cesar E. Chavez Boulevard, Portland, Multnomah, Oregon, 97212, United States
- Coordinates: 45.5358°N 122.6233°W
- Website: gadogadopdx.com

Gado Gado is an Asian restaurant in Portland, Oregon, United States.

== Description ==
The restaurant serves Indonesian and Chinese cuisine in Portland's Hollywood neighborhood; the menu includes pork-and-blood-sausage corn dogs, noodle and rice dishes (including nasi goreng with Chinese sausage and Dungeness crab), and salads, including a banana-leaf-smoked duck salad with citrus, lime leaf, and basil.

Gado Gado has been described as a "casual, colorful restaurant, tucked in a nondescript strip mall".

== History ==
Thomas Pisha-Duffly and Mariah Pisha-Duffly opened Gado Gado in June 2019, slightly later than initially planned. The restaurant began serving brunch in July. Following a two-week closure because of the COVID-19 pandemic, in April 2020 the Pisha-Dufflys launch a menu of "stoner food" called "Oma's Takeaway"; the pop-up, later renamed Oma's Hideaway, became a standalone restaurant in 2020.

Keith Lee visited the restaurant in 2025. The restaurant participated in Portland's Dumpling Week in 2026.

== Reception ==
In 2019, Gado Gado was a Restaurant of the Year finalist in Eater Portland's Eater Awards. Daniel Barnett included the restaurant in a 2020 list of "Portland's 10 Buzziest New Breakfasts and Brunches". Gado Gado was nominated in the Best New Restaurant category at the 2020 James Beard Awards.

In 2020, the restaurant was included in the Eater Portland lists "Portland's Top Pandan Treats" and "15 Delectable Dumpling Destinations in Portland". Brooke Jackson-Glidden also included Gado Gado in Eater Portland's 2021 list of "The 38 Essential Restaurants and Food Carts in Portland". The website's Nathan Williams included the restaurant in a 2022 list of "14 Standout Spots in Portland’s Eclectic Hollywood District". Katherine Chew Hamilton and Jackson-Glidden included Gado Gado in the website's 2025 list of the city's best restaurants and food cart pods for large groups.

In 2023, Thomas Pisha-Duffly was a finalist in the James Beard Foundation's "Best Chef: Northwest and Pacific" category. Michael Russell ranked Gado Gado number 18 in The Oregonian's 2025 list of Portland's 40 best restaurants. The business was included in Portland Monthly's 2025 list of 25 restaurants "that made Portland".

== See also ==
- List of Chinese restaurants
- List of Indonesian restaurants
