= Pasar (restaurant) =

Indonesian restaurant in Portland, Oregon, U.S.

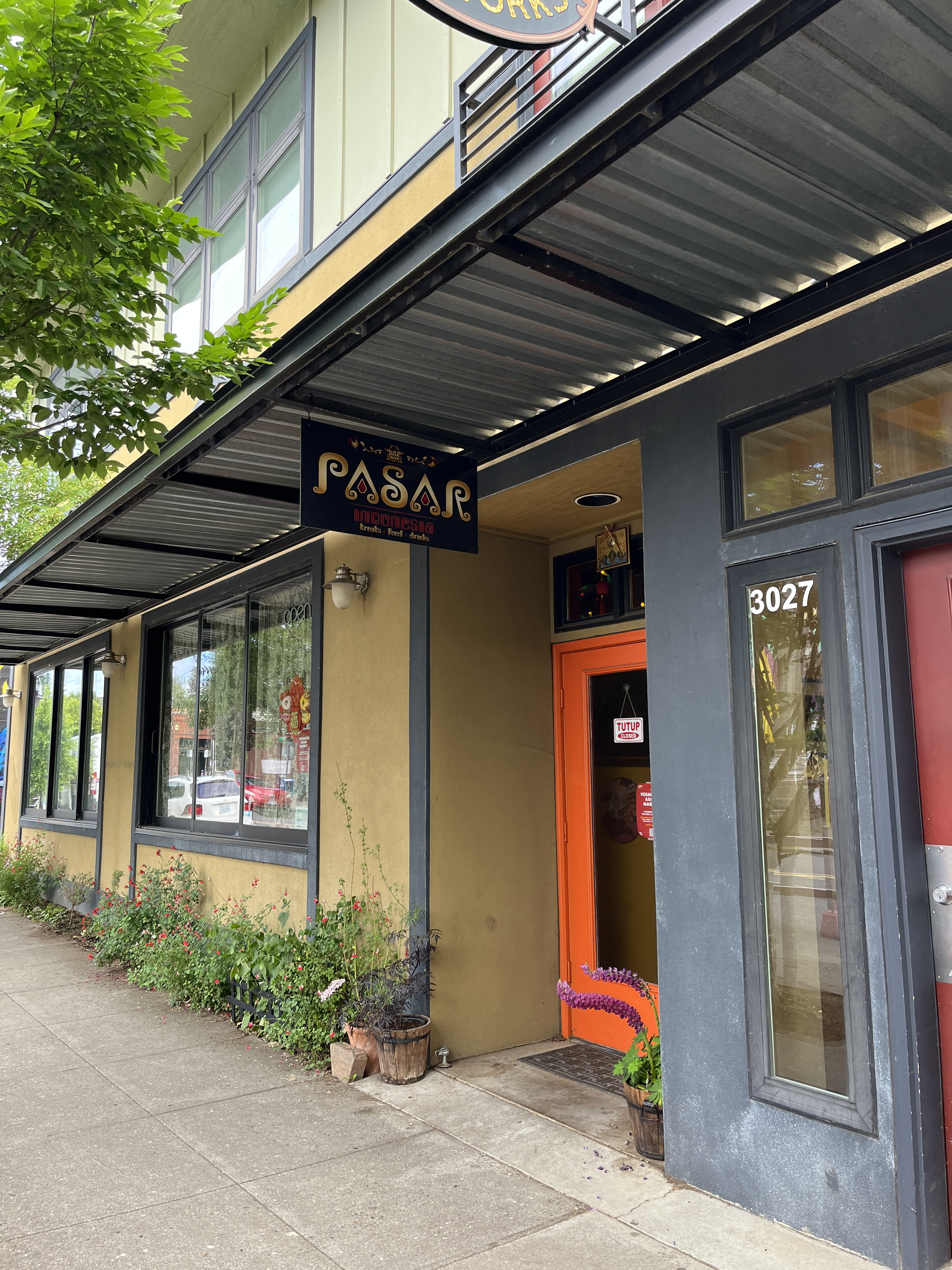
- The restaurant's exterior, 2025
- Interactive map of Pasar

Restaurant information
- Food type: Indonesian
- Location: Portland, Multnomah, Oregon, United States
- Coordinates: 45.5592°N 122.6343°W
- Website: pasarpdx.com

Pasar is an Indonesian restaurant in Portland, Oregon, United States. The restaurant opened in 2023 and was founded by the team behind Wajan, another Indonesian restaurant in Portland. Pasar was named one of the twenty best new restaurants of 2024 by Bon Appétit.

== Description ==
The Indonesian restaurant Pasar operates on Alberta Street in northeast Portland's Concordia neighborhood.

== Reception ==
Michael Russell ranked Pasar number 29 in The Oregonian's 2025 list of Portland's 40 best restaurants. He also included the lontong cap go meh in the newspaper's list of Portland's 25 best dishes of 2025.

== See also ==
- List of Indonesian restaurants
