= Oma's Hideaway =

Restaurant in Portland, Oregon, U.S.

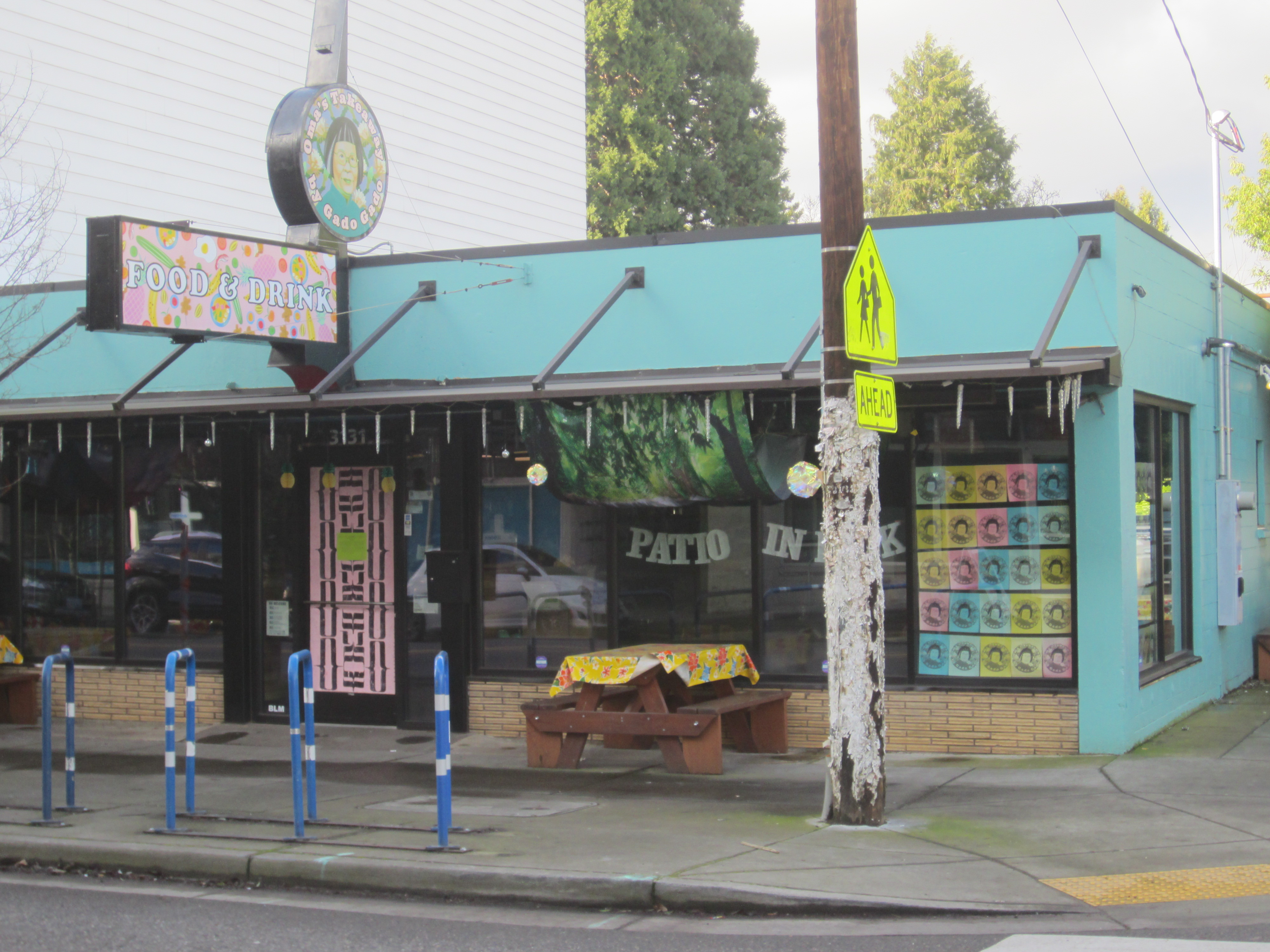
- The restaurant's exterior in 2021
- Interactive map of Oma's Hideaway

Restaurant information
- Food type: American; Asian; Chinese; Indonesian; Malaysian
- Location: 3131 Southeast Division Street, Portland, Multnomah, Oregon, 97202, United States
- Coordinates: 45.5049°N 122.6329°W
- Website: omashideaway.com

Oma's Hideaway, formerly Oma's Takeaway, is a restaurant in Portland, Oregon, United States.

== Description and history ==
Married co-owners Mariah and Thomas Pisha-Duffly opened Oma's Takeaway in April 2020, during the COVID-19 pandemic, when their first restaurant Gado Gado was closed. The pop-up has been described as "Asian stoner food". Later in 2020, Oma's relocated to the former Whiskey Soda Lounge space in southeast Portland's Richmond neighborhood, serving barbecue platters inspired by American, Chinese, and Southeast Asian (including Indonesian and Malaysian) cuisine. The restaurant was inspired by Thomas' Indonesia-born grandmother, whom he called Oma.

The restaurant closed in January 2021, then reopened as Oma's Hideaway on May 22. Oma's previewed the updated menu during a collaborative 420 celebration and fundraising event benefitting Last Prisoner Project. Upon reopening, Oma's served food inspired by Southeast Asian night markets such as noodles, char siu, and Chinese and Malaysian snacks.

The restaurant participated in Portland's Dumpling Week in 2026.

== Reception ==
Oma's Hideaway was included in Eater's 2023 list of the 19 "most funnest, most wildest, most unbelievably extra" restaurants in the United States. It was included in The Infatuation's 2024 list of Portland's best restaurants.

== See also ==
- List of Chinese restaurants
- List of Indonesian restaurants
