= Portland sign =

Sign in Portland, Oregon, U.S.

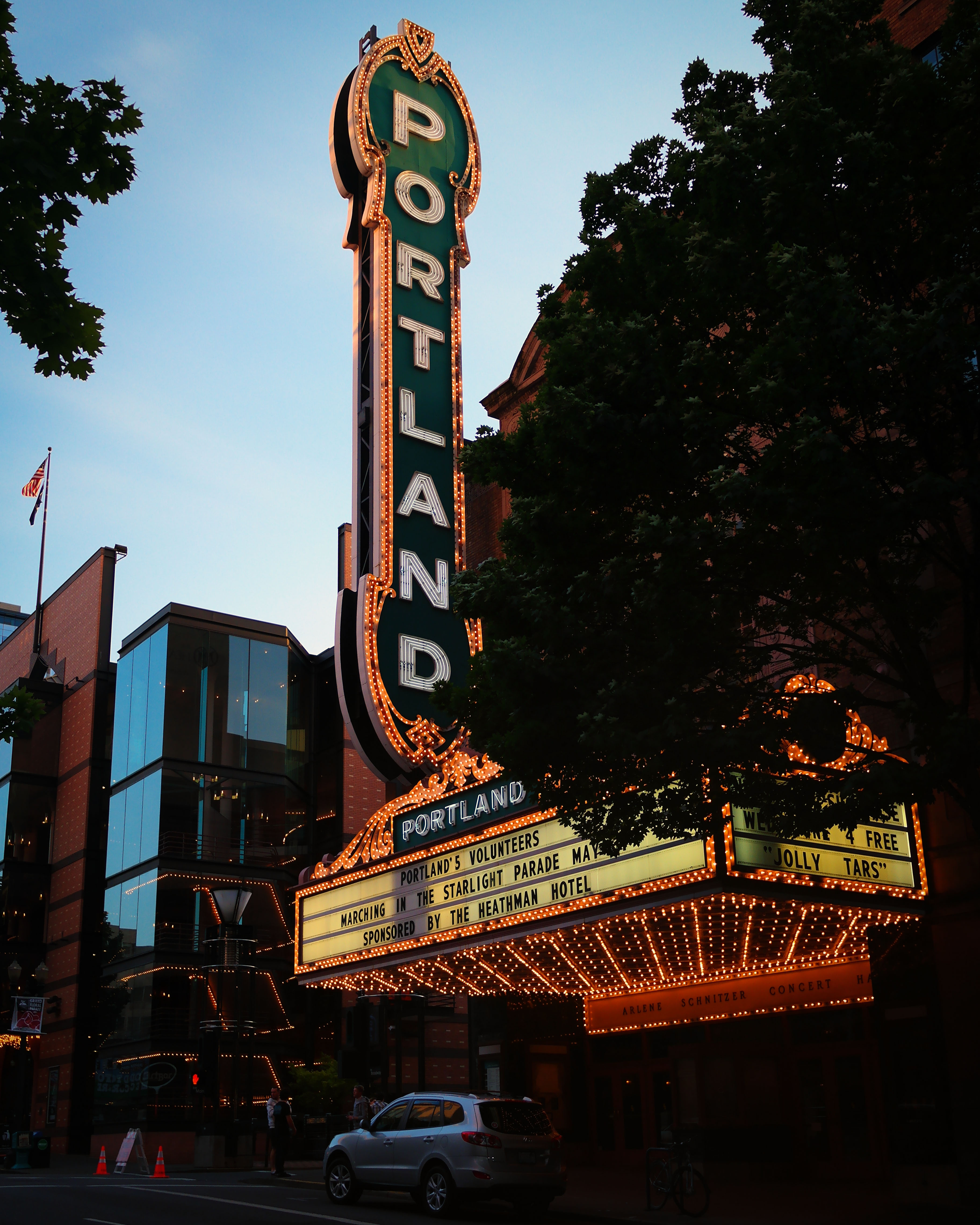
- The sign in 2014
- Interactive map of the Portland sign area

General information
- Location: Portland, Oregon, United States
- Coordinates: 45.51679°N 122.68116°W

The "Portland" sign is displayed on the exterior of Portland, Oregon's Arlene Schnitzer Concert Hall, in the United States.

== History ==
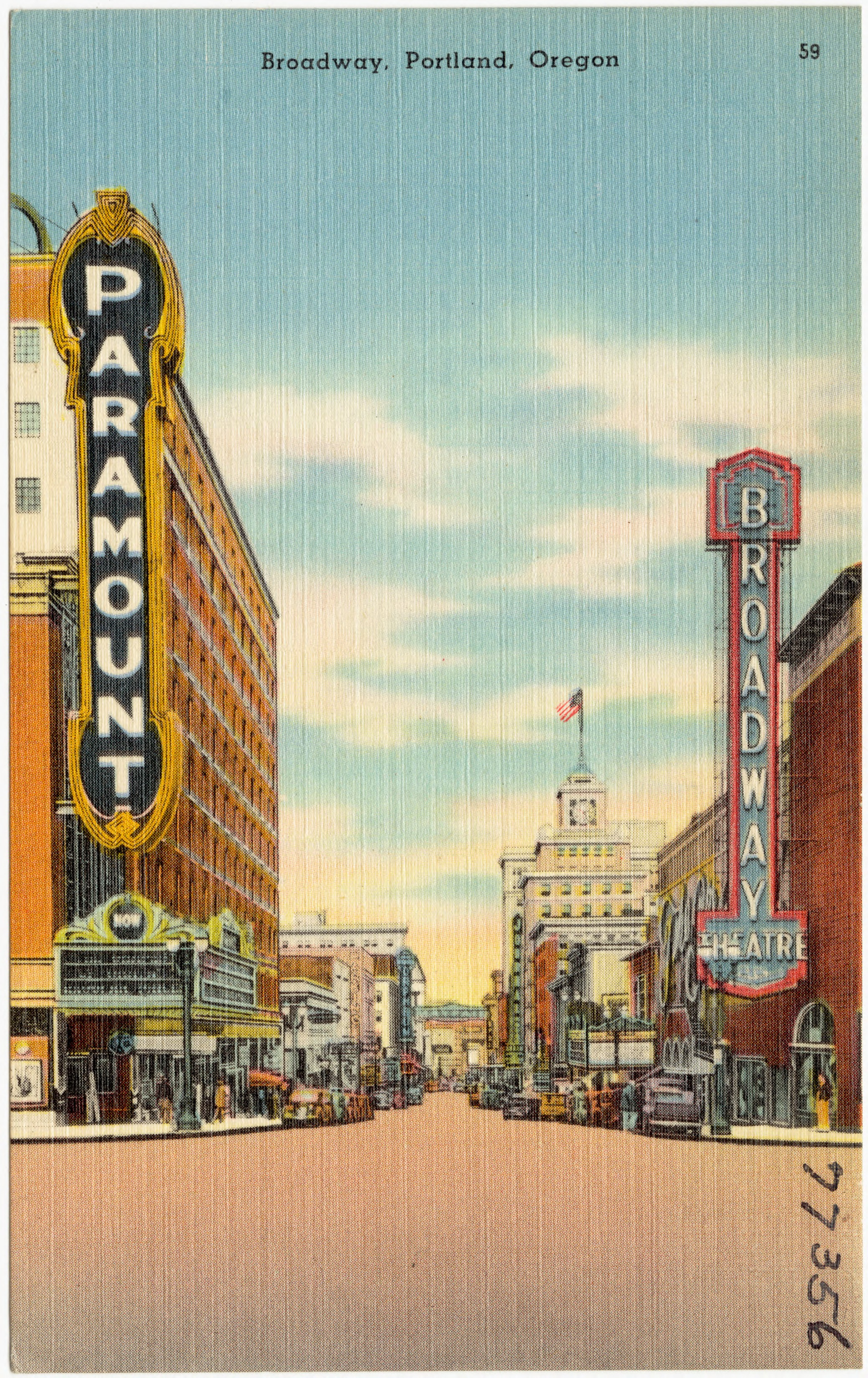
Postcard c. 1930–1945 postcard depicting the "Paramount" sign

The landmark is a tribute to the original sign that hung on the Paramount Theatre prior to 1984. A "Portland" sign was displayed when the venue was originally known as Portland Publix Theatre, which opened in March 1928. In 1930, the theater's owners secured a contract to show Paramount films, and changed the name of their business to the Paramount Theatre. Accordingly, the sign's lettering, but not its overall design, was changed to "Paramount".

A one-year, $10 million renovation of the building began in September 1983, after the city of Portland acquired it. In connection with that work, the landmark 65-foot-tall "Paramount" sign was removed on March 18, 1984, to be used by Ballard Sign Company of Salem as a model for a new replica which would restore the "Portland" wording that the sign had used originally. The new replica sign, with neon letters five feet tall, was attached to the building on September 4, 1984. The theatre re-opened four days later.

In May 2017, the sign began a two-month, $500,000 renovation, which would include a fresh coat of paint and brighter neon letters. It was removed from the building in early May and taken off-site for the work, which was funded by Metro (the operator of the Schnitzer Concert Hall). Reassembly of the sign was to be completed in mid-August, with a re-lighting ceremony on August 16.

In 2021, the marquee portion of the sign was changed from a manual-type to a digital, LED-type.

== See also ==
- Hung Far Low (restaurant), "Chop Suey Hung Far Low Cocktails" sign
- White Stag sign
