= Kenneth Koe =

American chemist

Billie Kenneth Koe (April 15, 1925 – October 7, 2015) was an American chemist of Chinese descent. He and Willard Welch developed sertraline, which was branded and sold as Zoloft by his longtime employer Pfizer starting in 1991.

== Biography ==
He was born to Chinese immigrants Benjamin and Monta Jean Koe in Astoria, Oregon on April 15, 1925. Later the family moved to Portland’s Chinatown district. Koe attended Lincoln High School and won a full scholarship to Reed College, where he majored in chemistry and wrote his undergraduate thesis on osmotic pressure. During this time, he also supported the family by washing dishes at Hung Far Low.

After graduating from Reed, Koe earned a master's degree from the University of Washington and a doctorate from the California Institute of Technology. Koe joined Pfizer's Brooklyn laboratory in 1955, and started developing antibiotics. His research focus later shifted to uses of serotonin–norepinephrine reuptake inhibitors as well as selective serotonin reuptake inhibitors in psychotherapeutic drugs.

In 1977, he took an interest in tametraline, a family of psychoactive compounds that Pfizer had developed, then discarded. He wondered if the series could be modified to block the absorption of serotonin in the brain, thus boosting its concentration. He and Welch began to synthesize and test new derivatives until they hit upon a highly selective and potent reuptake inhibitor they named sertraline; Koe published the first paper on it in 1983. Sertraline was approved for medical use in the United States for depression and other conditions in 1991 and soon became one of the most prescribed psychiatric medications in the US.

Koe held 14 U.S. patents and authored or co-authored 150 technical articles, but the discovery of sertraline was the highlight of his career. Reed College honored Koe with the Howard Vollum Award in 2008. During his acceptance speech, he said:

"I and my colleagues have been awed and gratified that our efforts produced a world class drug that can help sick people. More than once, strangers, acquaintances, and friends who benefited from taking Zoloft have come up and thanked me personally for my part in the discovery of this antidepressant." "My role in the discovery of Zoloft depended on many factors coming together. Personal prerequisites include a solid technical background, a willingness to learn and adapt, a prepared mind, and perseverance. Having congenial colleagues and understanding bosses is important. A key factor in all drug discovery efforts is still luck! I was lucky to have been part of the golden era of the pharmaceutical industry, which gave me a unique opportunity for creative thinking and doing scientific research in technical areas outside of my chemistry training."

The American Chemical Society hailed the discovery of sertraline by giving Charles A. Harbert, Reinhard Sarges, Albert Weissman, Koe, and Welch the Award for Team Innovation in 2006.

While Koe worked at Pfizer's headquarters in Groton, Connecticut and after he retired in 1995, he lived in Ledyard.

Koe died in Shrewsbury, Massachusetts on October 7, 2015, aged 90.
