= Whiskey Soda Lounge =

Defunct restaurants in Oregon and Brooklyn, United States

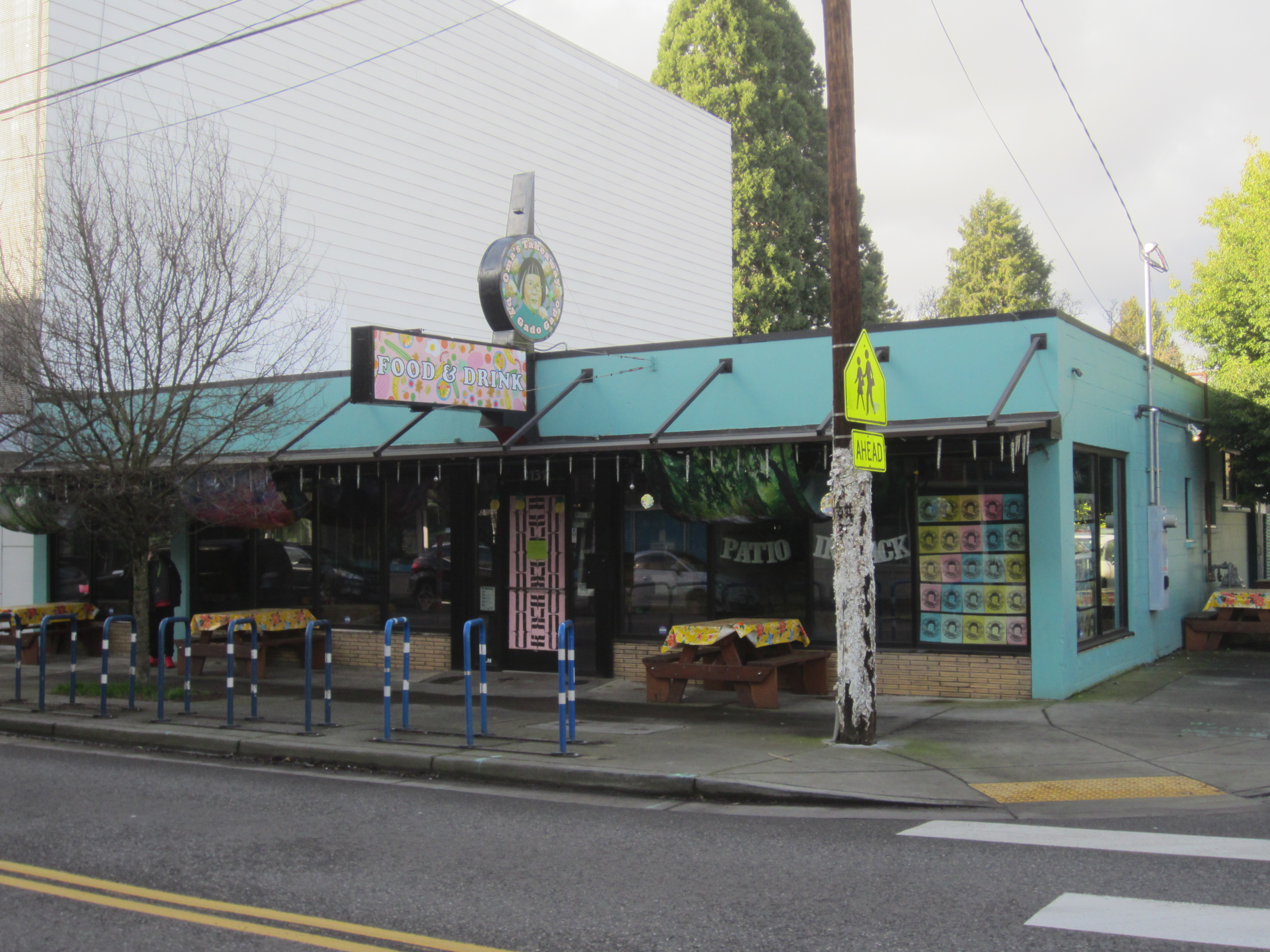
- The exterior of Oma's Hideaway, which is housed in the building formerly occupied by Whiskey Soda Lounge, in 2021
- Interactive map of Whiskey Soda Lounge

Restaurant information
- Location: Portland, Oregon, United States
- Coordinates: 45.5049°N 122.6328°W

Whiskey Soda Lounge was a bar and Thai restaurant by Andy Ricker in Portland, Oregon's Richmond neighborhood, in the United States. Located across the street from Ricker's Pok Pok restaurant, the whiskey-centric bar closed in 2020, during the COVID-19 pandemic.

== Portland ==
The Portland restaurant began serving happy hour in 2010. The restaurant served brunch from 2016 to 2017.

Oma's Hideaway replaced Whiskey Soda Lounge, after closing during the COVID-19 pandemic.

== Brooklyn ==
Ricker opened a second Whiskey Soda Lounge in Brooklyn, also near a Pok Pok location, in August 2013. It was unable to find a sufficient customer base, and closed less than two years later.

== See also ==
- Impact of the COVID-19 pandemic on the restaurant industry in the United States
