= Andy Ricker =

American chef

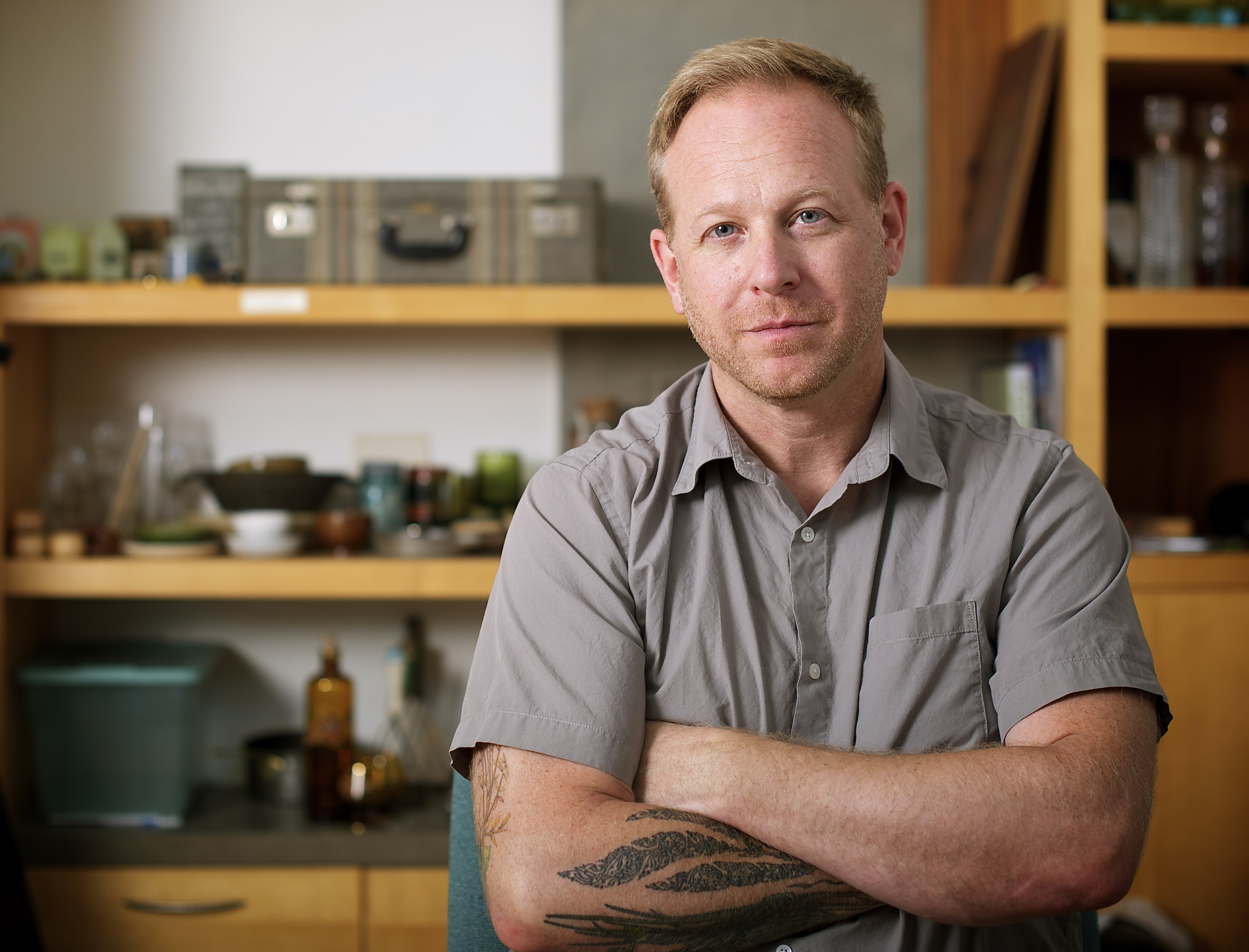
- Ricker in 2011
- Born: Andrew Hiram Ricker; December 28, 1963 (age 62); New Hope, North Carolina, U.S.
- Culinary career
- Cooking style: Thai cuisine

Andrew Hiram "Andy" Ricker (born December 28, 1963) is an American chef, restaurateur and cookery writer, known for his skill and expertise in northern Thai cuisine.

== Life and career ==
Ricker was born in North Carolina, and lived for a period in Jeffersonville, Vermont. He began working as a dishwasher at a fondue restaurant in Vermont at 16. Ricker left Vermont after graduating high school and moved to Vail, Colorado. After three and a half years as a cook, he left Colorado to pursue international travel.

Whilst travelling, he accumulated culinary knowledge whilst backpacking, working and staging in New Zealand, Australia and Thailand, including in Raymond Blanc's Michelin-star restaurant Belmond Le Manoir aux Quat'Saisons in Oxfordshire.

He first visited Thailand in 1987. From 1992 onward, he continued his travels to Thailand, residing there for several months each year to study Thai food culture.

After returning to the United States in 1989, Ricker founded Pok Pok in Portland, Oregon in November 2005, which closed in 2020 during the COVID-19 pandemic.

== Restaurants and bars ==
- Pok Pok, Portland (November 2005 - 2020)
- Ping (2009 - 2020)
- Whiskey Soda Lounge, Portland (December 2009 - 2020)
- Pok Pok Noi (March 2011 - 2020)
- Pok Pok Wing (renamed: Pok Pok Phat Thai) (January 2012 - 2020)
- Pok Pok Ny, New York (April 2012 - 2020)
- Sen Yai, Portland (May 2013 - 2020)
- Whiskey Soda Lounge Ny, New York (August 2013 - 2020)
- Pok Pok Phat Thai, LA (November 2014 - 2020)
- Pok Pok LA (October 2015 - 2020)
- Pok Pok NW (Spring 2017 - 2020)

== Awards ==
- 2007: "Restaurant of the Year" by The Oregonian for Pok Pok in Portland
- 2009: GQ Magazine's "Top Ten Best New Restaurants in America"
- 2011: James Beard Foundation Award: Best Chef, Northwest for his restaurant Pok Pok in Portland in 2011
- 2014: James Beard Foundation's annual Book, Broadcast and Journal Awards, in the category "cooking, recipes or instruction" for the article "The Star of Siam: Thai Curries" in Saveur magazine
- 2014: IACP Award in the category "Instructional Culinary Writing" for the article "The Star of Siam: Thai Curries" in Saveur magazine
- 2014: Pok Pok Ny receives a star in the 2015 Michelin Guide for New York City

== Books ==
- Pok Pok: Food and Stories from the Streets, Homes, and Roadside Restaurants of Thailand (co-author J.J. Goode, photographer Austin Bush, foreword by chef David Thompson, January 1st, 2013)
- POK POK Noodles: Recipes from Thailand and Beyond [A Cookbook] (co-author J.J Goode, May 21, 2019)
- Pok Pok: The Drinking Food of Thailand (co-author J.J Goode, photographer Austin Bush, October 31, 2017)

== Television ==
- Anthony Bourdain: No Reservations, Brooklyn, November 2012
- Anthony Bourdain: Parts Unknown, Thailand, June 2014
- Farang, the story of chef Andy Ricker by VICE Films, July 2014
- The Taste, Bring the Heat, January 2015
- Diners, Drive-Ins and Dives with Guy Fieri, Season 28, Episode 21, 2018

== See also ==
- James Beard Foundation Award: 2010s
