= Pok Pok =

Defunct chain of Thai restaurants

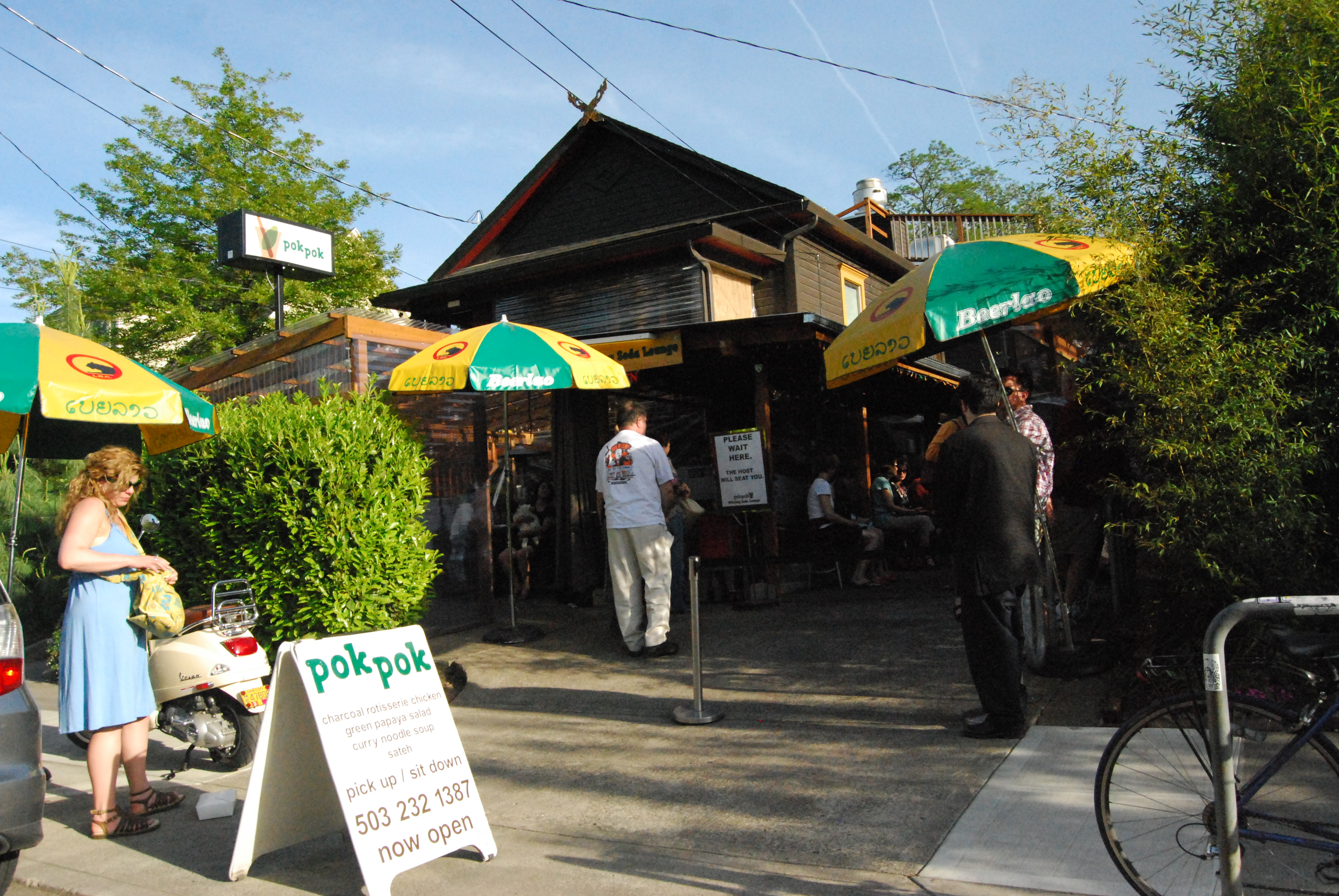
- Pok Pok and the Whiskey Soda Lounge in Portland, Oregon, in 2009
- Interactive map of Pok Pok

Restaurant information
- Established: 2005; 21 years ago
- Closed: 2020; 6 years ago
- Owner: Andy Ricker
- Head chef: Andy Ricker
- Food type: Thai
- Location: 3226 Southeast Division Street, Portland, Oregon, United States
- Coordinates: 45.50468°N 122.63219°W
- Website: Pok Pok Restaurants

Pok Pok was a chain of Thai restaurants based in Portland, Oregon, United States. The business was founded and led by chef Andy Ricker. Pok Pok won both local recognition and major industry awards, with The Oregonian describing the restaurant as "one of those quintessentially Portland institutions, a sort of rags-to-riches story of the street cart that became a restaurant that became a legend."

The main restaurant was located on Southeast Division Street in Portland; with its success Ricker opened satellite locations elsewhere in Portland, and at various times in Brooklyn, Los Angeles, and Las Vegas. Its remaining locations closed in 2020, during the COVID-19 pandemic.

== History ==
The first Pok Pok opened in 2005, specializing in street food and northern Thai cuisine that Ricker had eaten on his travels, especially through Chiang Mai. The restaurant grew in recognition, being named The Oregonian's 2007 Restaurant of the Year, and featured in a 2009 episode of Guy Fieri's Diners, Drive-Ins and Dives. In 2011, Ricker was named the James Beard Foundation's 2011 "Best Chef: Northwest" for his work. At its closure in 2020, The Oregonian called Pok Pok "Portland’s defining restaurant for more than a decade."

=== Outposts ===
A Brooklyn location followed in 2012; the Michelin Guide awarded it a star in its 2015 and 2016 editions but rescinded it in the 2017 Guide. It appeared in the series finale of Anthony Bourdain: No Reservations. Ricker closed the restaurant on September 2, 2018, citing rising costs.

Pok Pok Phat Thai and Pok Pok LA opened in the Chinatown neighborhood of Los Angeles in December 2014 and November 2015 respectively. Pok Pok Phat Thai closed in August 2016, and Pok Pok LA followed in March of the following year.

In 2018, a Pok Pok Wing opened in the Cosmopolitan of Las Vegas's Block 16 Urban Food Hall dining area. This closed in December 2020 following the expiration of its licensing agreement, the last of the Pok Pok restaurants.

=== COVID-19 pandemic ===
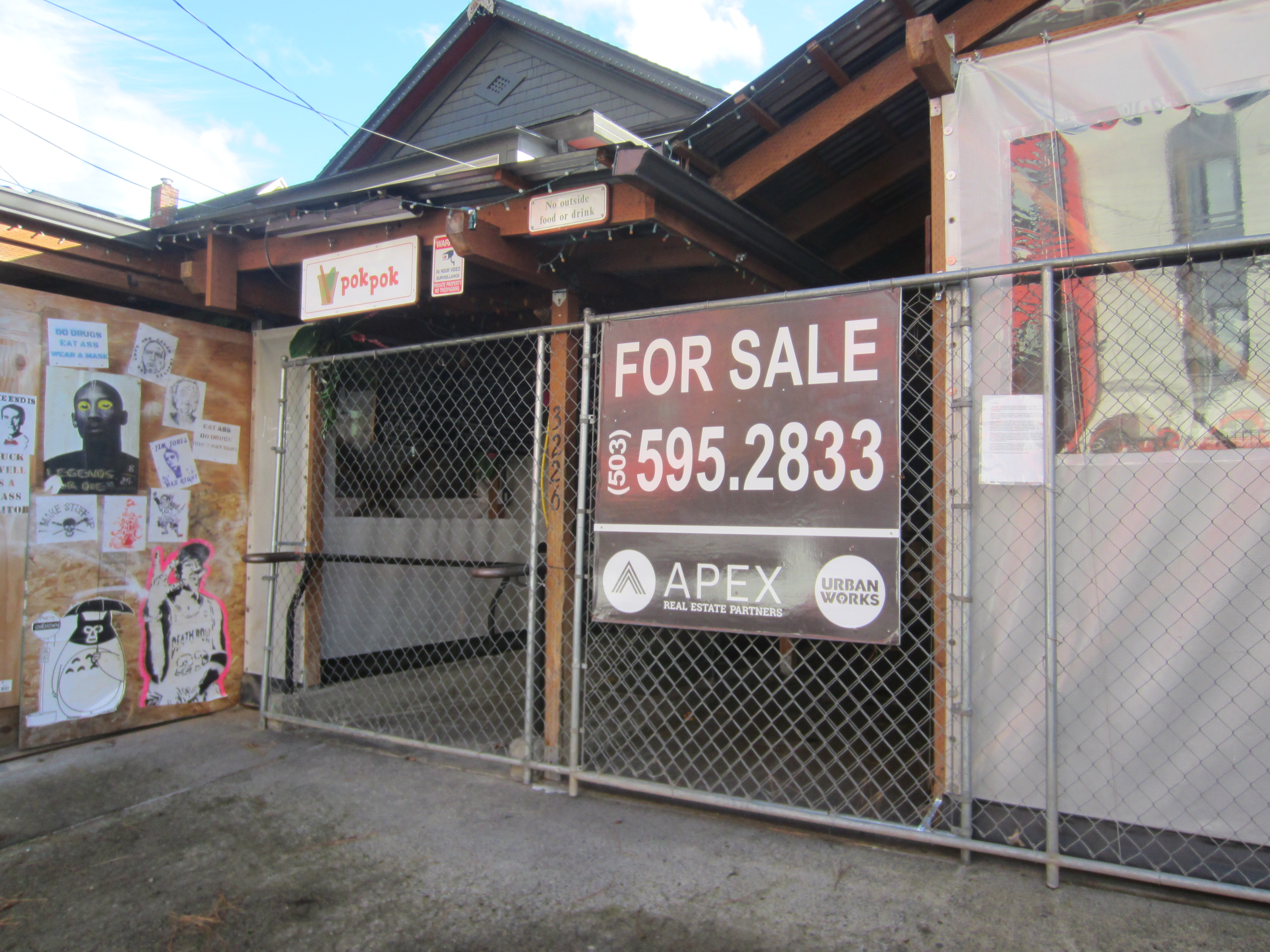
Exterior of the Portland restaurant in 2021, after closing permanently in 2020

In March 2020, Pok Pok announced its indefinite closure of all locations due to the COVID-19 pandemic, which has had an impact on the restaurant industry due to social distancing mandates and guidelines. Initially, Pok Pok followed the example of many restaurants across the US in providing takeout and delivery services while dine-in remains prohibited. Following the coronavirus-caused death of New York chef, Floyd Cardoz, Pok Pok's Andy Ricker published a statement explaining Cardoz's death as the reason for the change in strategy. Ricker cited the tragedy as a “wake-up call to the restaurant industry” and himself. In mid June, Ricker confirmed the permanent closure of Pok Pok NW, Whiskey Soda Lounge, and the northeast and southwest Pok Pok Wing locations, leaving just the main restaurant and possibly the southeast Pok Pok Wing location. Ricker announced closure of the original and remaining locations in October 2020. A remaining Pok Pok Wing in Las Vegas continued service through December.

== Reception ==
Pok Pok won in the Best Restaurant category of Willamette Week's annual 'Best of Portland' readers' poll in 2015. It won in the Best Thai Restaurant category in 2016, 2017, and 2018. It was a runner-up in the Best Vietnamese Restaurant category in 2020 and the Best Wings category in 2022. Pok Pok was included in Portland Monthly's 2025 list of 25 restaurants "that made Portland".

== See also ==
- COVID-19 pandemic in Portland, Oregon
- Impact of the COVID-19 pandemic on the restaurant industry in the United States
- James Beard Foundation Award: 2010s
- List of restaurants in New York City
- List of Thai restaurants
