= Mardi Gras in Portland, Oregon =

Annual holiday celebration in Portland, Oregon, U.S.

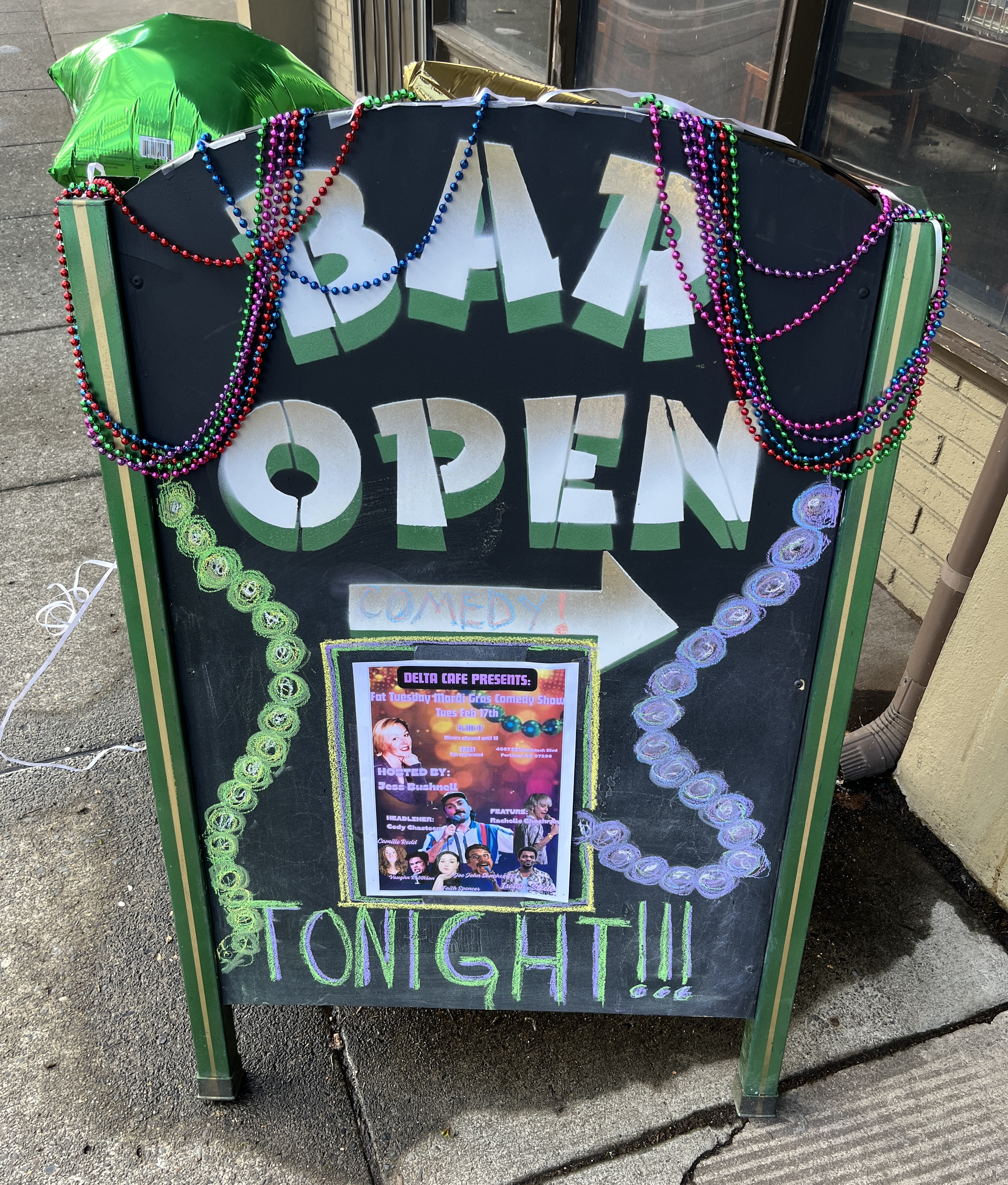
Sign with Mardi Gras throws promoting a Fat Tuesday comedy show at Delta Cafe, in southeast Portland, Oregon's Woodstock neighborhood, in 2026

A holiday Mardi Gras is celebrated annually in the American city of Portland, Oregon. The annual Mardi Gras Parade and Ball is organized by the Mysti Krewe of Nimbus. Mayor Harry Lane, who is credited for starting the Portland Rose Festival, was inspired by annual Mardi Gras celebrations.

== Events ==
The annual Portland Mardi Gras Parade and Ball is arranged by the Mysti Krewe of Nimbus, described by Willamette Week as "Portland's community of Louisiana expats". In 2023, the newspaper's Brianna Wheeler wrote: "Founded in 2010, Mysti Krewe (named for the misty Pacific Northwest atmosphere) has served as a subcommunity for Louisiana transplants and locals who simply love the culture. For 12 years, they have held a Mardi Gras ball and parade, bringing that trademark Carnival energy to the historically Black neighborhood around North Mississippi Avenue each season." The Mysti Krewe of Nimbus bills its ball and parade as the "most authentic Mardi Gras events" in the Pacific Northwest. The group's mission is "to bring Louisiana Mardi Gras culture" to the region, according to KGW. The Mysti Krewe of Nimbus had approximately 50 members in 2012 and 100 members in 2023. The group has also participated in the annual 82nd Avenue of Roses Parade.

In addition to the annual parade and ball, the city has seen other Mardi Gras festivities. In 2011, the Gypsy Restaurant and Velvet Lounge hosted a "Fat Tuesday Bayou Bash" with live music, a fortune teller, and a palm reader. The Rose City Blues 2026 Mardi Gras Jamboree was presented by the Portland Blues and Jazz Dance Society. The festival had contests, music, workshops, and an indoor parade in collaboration with Mysti Krewe of Nimbus.

=== Ball ===
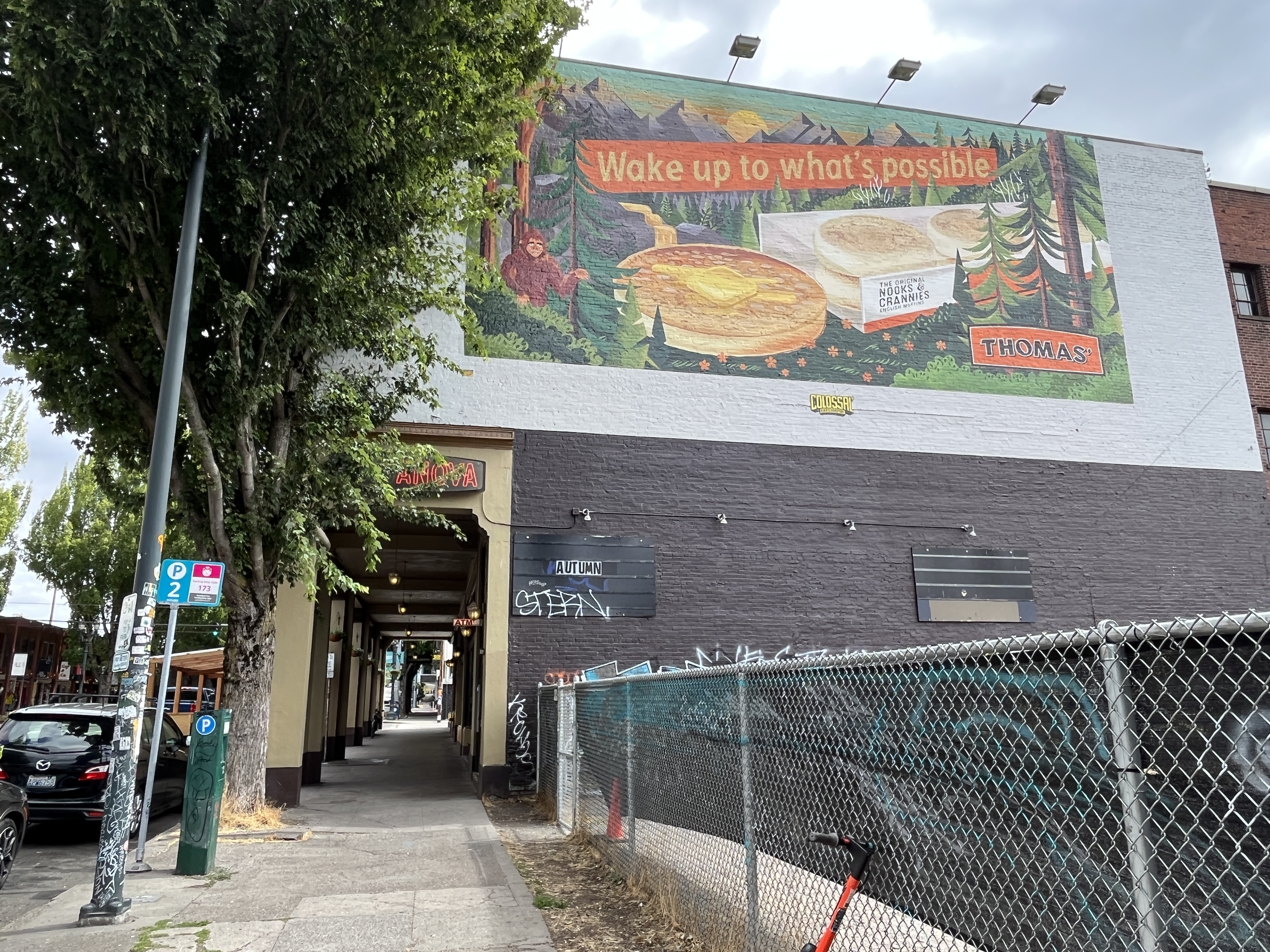
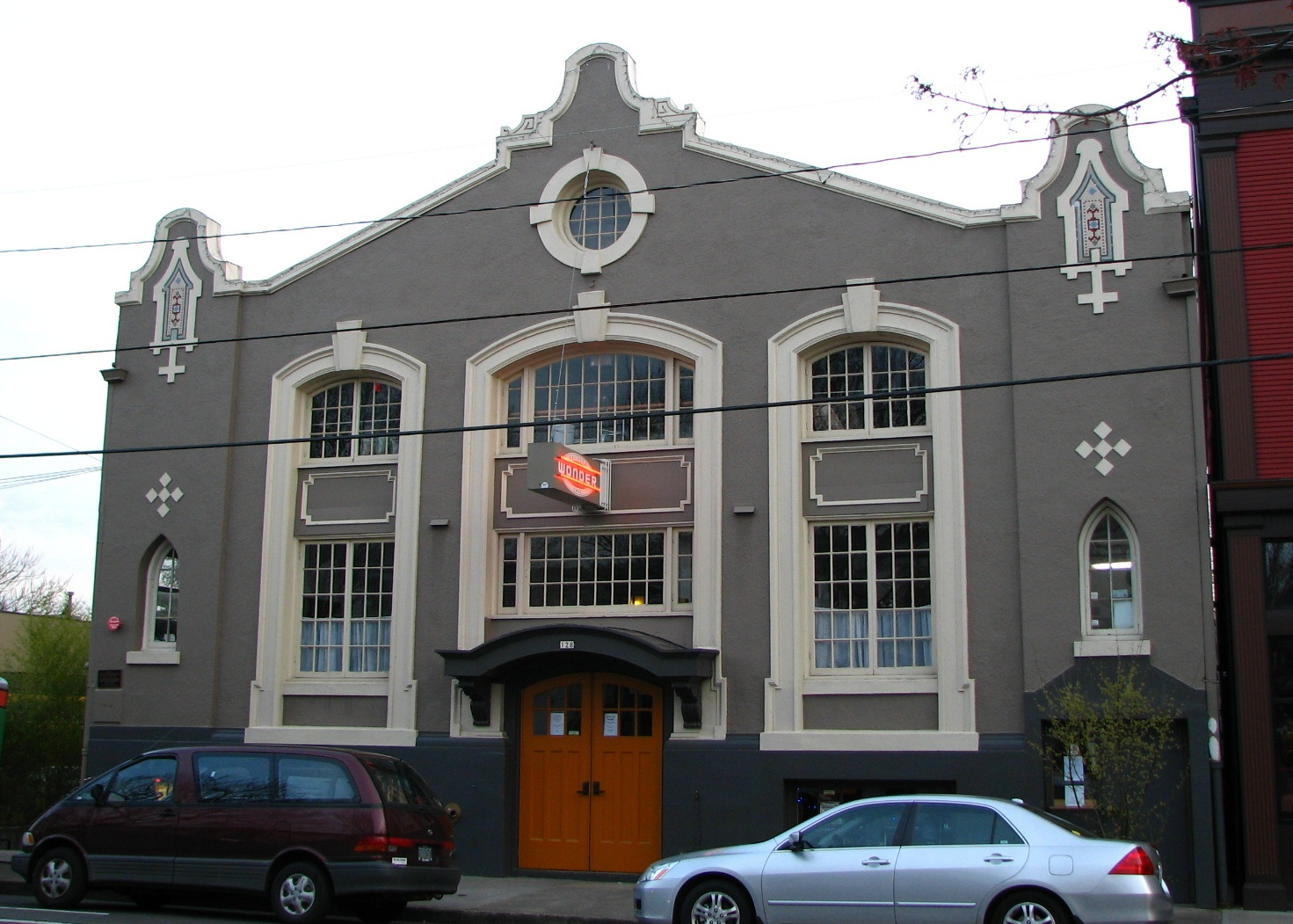
The Mardi Gras ball has been held at the event space Nova PDX (top, pictured in 2022) and the music venue Wonder Ballroom (bottom, pictured in 2008).

In 2018, Dillon Pilorget of The Oregonian described the ball as "the closest you can get to New Orleans in Portland". In 2024, Willamette Week said the ball "is billed as one of the most authentic celebrations of Louisiana culture outside the Pelican State, according to the New Orleans Times-Picayune". Costumes are encouraged, and the ball has served king cake (a food associated with the holiday) and crowned a Mardi Gras king and queen.

The first ball was held in 2011. The 2012 and 2013 balls were held at the event space Nova PDX, formerly known as Bossanova Ballroom. Performers in 2012 included Atomic Gumbo, the Too Loose Cajun/Zydeco Band, and the Transcendental Brass Band. The theme in 2013 was "Such a Night". The 2014 and 2015 events were held at the music venue Wonder Ballroom. In 2015, Mardi Gras and Valentine's Day were the same weekend; the Mysti Krewe of Nimbus called the event the "VooDoo Valentine Mardi Gras Ball". The 2016 event was at Nova PDX and the theme was "Life is a Carnival". The 2018 event was at the Tiffany Center and the theme was "Rollin' on the River". In 2019, the ball was held at the same venue and the theme was "Tableaux on Pirates Alley". Performers included BrassRoots Movement, Northwest Bones Gang, and the Too Loose Cajun and Zydeco Band.

The ball's theme in 2020 was "Magical Mystery Krewe". Approximately 600 people attended the 2023 ball at Wonder Ballroom. The event's theme was "Cirque de Krewe" and music acts included BrassRoots Movement, Kris Deelane and the Hurt, Northside Bone Gang, and TooLoose Cajun Zydeco Band. The event was at the same venue in 2024 and had Cajun food, costumes, dancing, and king cake. The 2025 ball's theme was "enchanted forest". The Too Loose Cajun Zydeco Band was the headliner. The 2026 ball was held at Wonder Ballroom on Valentine's Day and the theme was "Sea of Love".

=== Parade ===
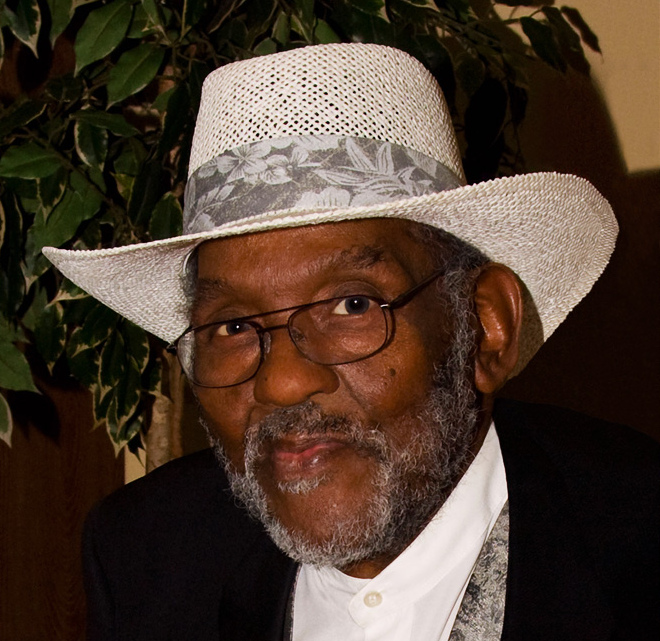
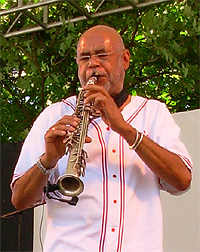
Jazz musicians Mel Brown (left, pictured in 2008) and Reggie Houston (right, pictured in 2006) were the parade's grand marshal in 2022 and 2026, respectively.

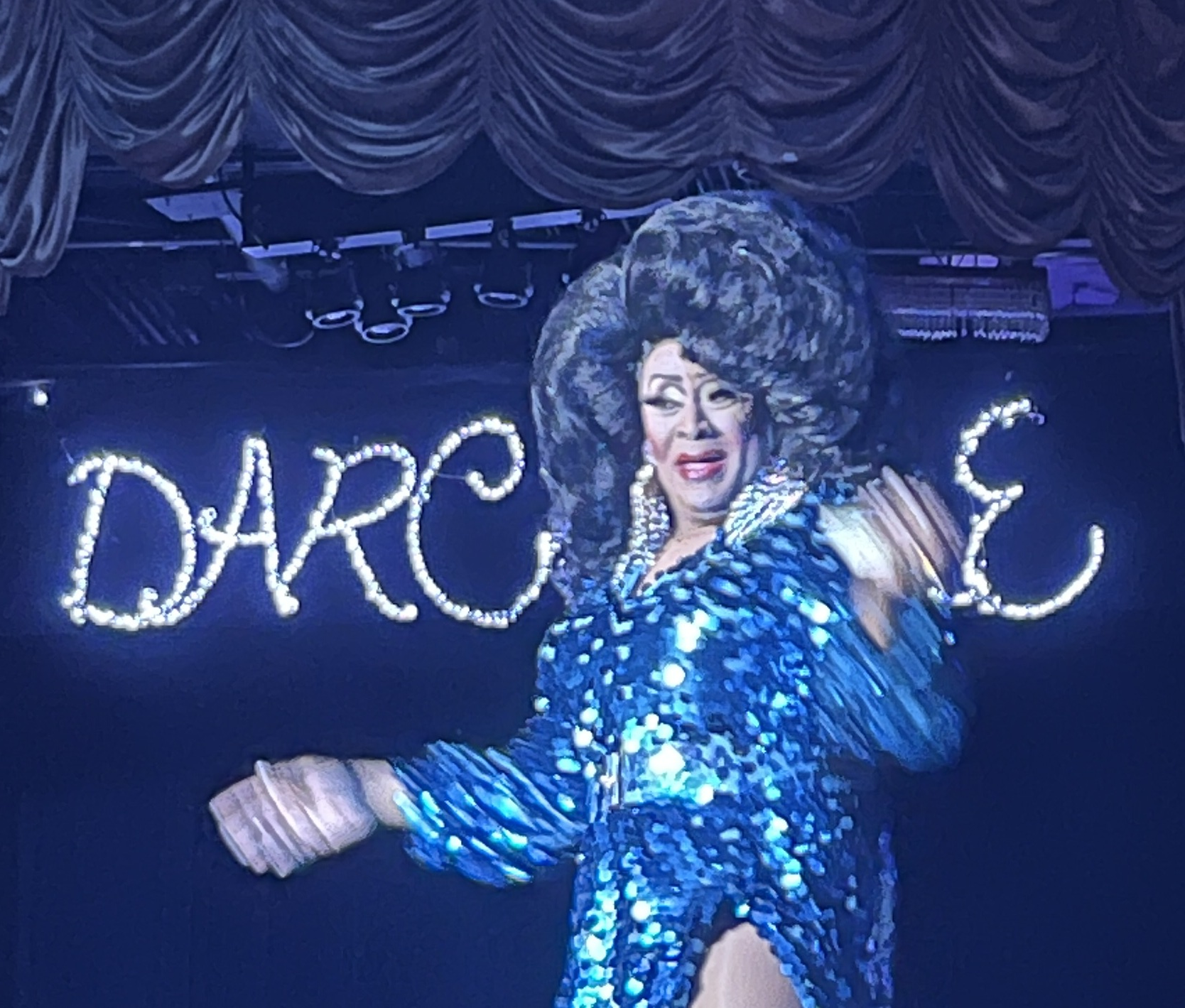
Drag performer Poison Waters (pictured performing at Darcelle XV Showplace in 2022) was the grand marshal in 2025.

The parade is usually held along Mississippi Avenue in north Portland and includes bead throwing. It features art and entertainers, and businesses along the route offer Mardi Gras-themed specials. In 2026, Rosemarie Stein of The Oregonian wrote, "This free, family-friendly event welcomes Portlanders of all ages in a celebration of creativity, joy and community. Expect colorful costumes, puppets, dance troupes, marching bands, circus performers, and krewes bringing their own signature flair to the streets."

Hundreds of people attended the 2015 parade. The parade route was from Albina to Fremont in 2017. The 2019 event had seven marching bands, two dance groups, and three floats. A post-parade celebration in 2020 was held at Mississippi Studios and featured the Too Loose Cajun Zydeco Band. The 2021 event was cancelled because of the COVID-19 pandemic.

Jazz drummer Mel Brown was the parade's grand marshal in 2022. Hundreds of people attended the 2023 parade, which had bead tossing, dancing, jugglers, and music. In 2025, drag performer Poison Waters was the parade's grand marshal. Jazz musician Reggie Houston was the grand marshal of the 2026 parade.

== Food and themed establishments ==
Many local restaurants have offered special menus in conjunction with Mardi Gras. In 2016, the defunct Tapalaya hosted its third annual Lundi Gras Breakside Brewery Dinner in collaboration with Breakside Brewery. The restaurant Bowery Bagels, as well as the defunct Acadia, Irving Street Kitchen, and Miss Delta, have also served specials. Other restaurants that hosted Mardi Gras celebrations included Brasserie Montmartre, EastBurn, and Interurban. In 2022, Screen Door served gumbo, jambalaya, cornbread, coleslaw, collard greens, and fruit crisps. In 2025, the restaurant served Louisiana crawfish boil, gumbo with chicken and andouille, crawfish étouffée, and king cake. Other bakeries and restaurants that have served king cake include Delta Cafe, Dos Hermanos Bakery, Eat: An Oyster Bar, Helen Bernhard Bakery, La Provence and Petite Provence, the defunct NOLA Doughnuts (2015–2023), and St. Honoré Boulangerie.

Portland had a bar called Voodoo Lounge, which "featured a Mardi Gras theme, as if every day were Fat Tuesday", according to The Oregonian.

== See also ==
- Culture of Portland, Oregon
- Mardi Gras in the United States
  - Mardi Gras in Mobile, Alabama
  - Mardi Gras in New Orleans
- Mystic society
