= Gypsy Restaurant and Velvet Lounge =

Defunct restaurant and nightclub in Portland, Oregon, U.S.

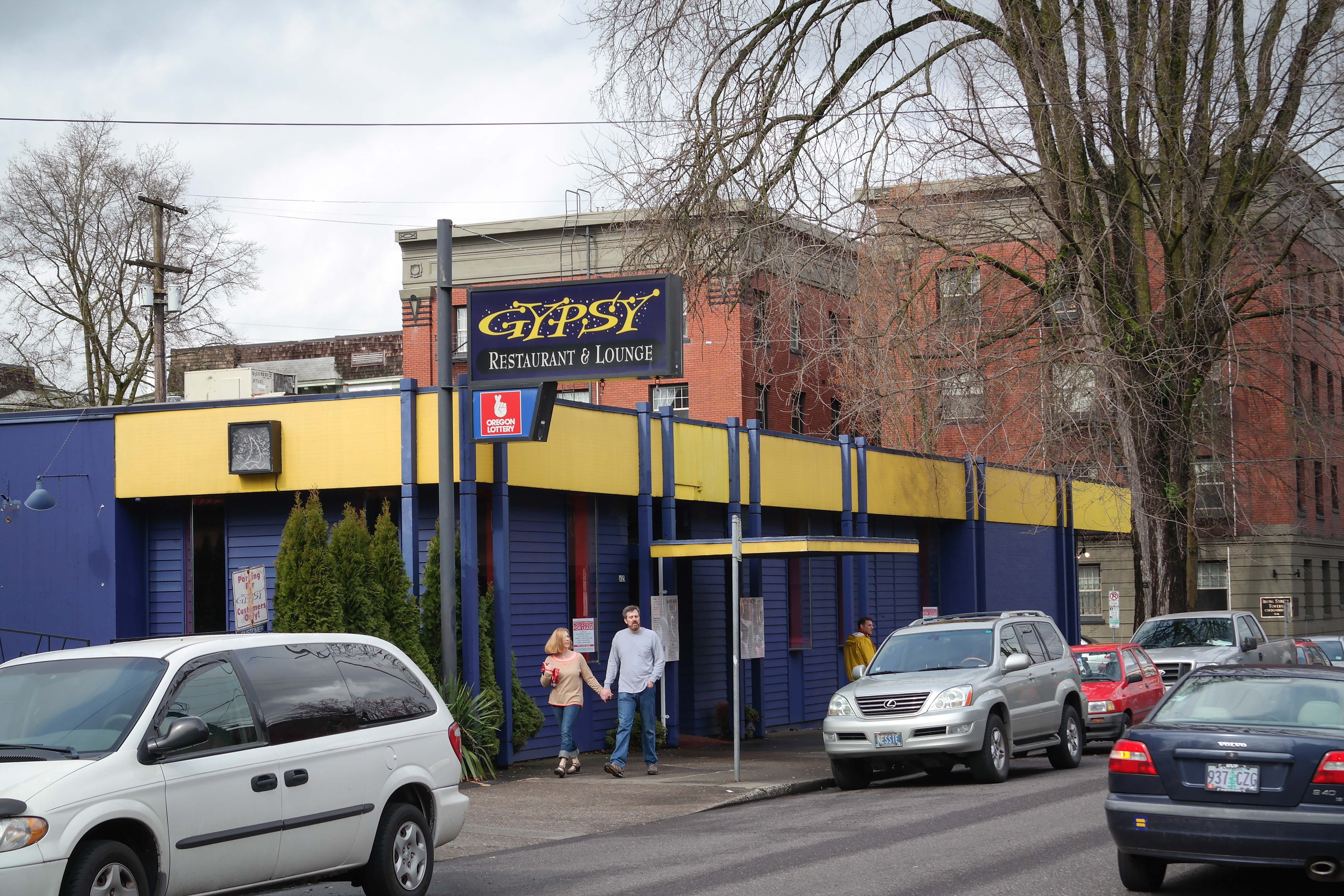
- The restaurant's exterior in 2014, shortly after closing
- Interactive map of Gypsy Restaurant and Velvet Lounge

Restaurant information
- Established: 1947
- Closed: February 20, 2014
- Previous owners: Stacy Gurganus (c. 1973); Gertrude "Tiny" Hursick (c. 1987); John Hursick (c. early 1990s); Concept Entertainment (1992–2014)
- Location: 625 Northwest 21st Avenue, Portland, Multnomah, Oregon, 97209, United States
- Coordinates: 45.52756°N 122.69468°W
- Reservations: No

The Gypsy Restaurant and Velvet Lounge was a restaurant and nightclub established in 1947 and located along Northwest 21st Avenue in the Northwest District neighborhood of Portland, Oregon, in the United States. Popular with young adults, the restaurant was known for serving fishbowl alcoholic beverages, for its 1950s furnishings, and for hosting karaoke, trivia competitions, and goldfish racing tournaments. The restaurant is said to have influenced local alcohol policies; noise complaints and signs of drunken behavior by patrons made the business a target for curfews and closure. Concept Entertainment owned the restaurant from 1992 until 2014 when it was closed unexpectedly.

== Description ==
Located at 625 Northwest 21st Avenue in the Nob Hill area of Portland's Northwest District neighborhood, Gypsy was a "boisterous", "disco-balled" dive bar, recognizable by its bouncers, karaoke, and "wobbling smokers". The Portland Mercury said the restaurant was a "kinda retro-y bar... popular with a young college-y, drinkin', party crowd". One Portland resident described the club as "the kind of place where you can go with your sophisticated friends and look at the Daddy-O decor. Or you can go on a date and snuggle in a corner where the lighting is low. And if you want to meet new people you can stroll through there and see people whose faces you've never seen before, which is a rare thing in Portland."

The interior featured 1950s furnishings and "pinball-panel" wall decorations. In 1963, The Oregonian described the artwork on the interior walls, which included a large and colorful painting depicting a gypsy camp, and an "attractive" nude called Dian by Grace Harlow, a painter and former student of Louis Bunce. The venue also featured "mottled" iridescent red windows that were translucent, could seat 150 guests, and included a banquet area.

Gypsy was also known for serving fishbowl alcoholic beverages, and in its final years, for hosting goldfish racing tournaments. The restaurant served soup, sandwiches, and full entrees. Karaoke was available beginning at 9 pm on Tuesday through Saturday evenings.

== History ==
Gypsy Restaurant and Lounge was established in 1947 and was originally located at 612 Northwest 21st Avenue. In 1948, The Oregonian published an advertisement for business, promoting an eight-course dinner for $1.25 between the hours of 4 pm and 3 am. The restaurant's location was described as "next to 21st Avenue Theater", between Northwest Hoyt and Irving Streets. In 1955, the paper reported that $1,000 was stolen from an unlocked safe stored at the Gypsy Restaurant. In 1963, the restaurant and lounge moved to its final location, at the intersection of Northwest 21st Avenue and Hoyt Street, across from Cinema 21. On opening night, the "New Gypsy" restaurant reportedly played songs by Frank Fontaine.

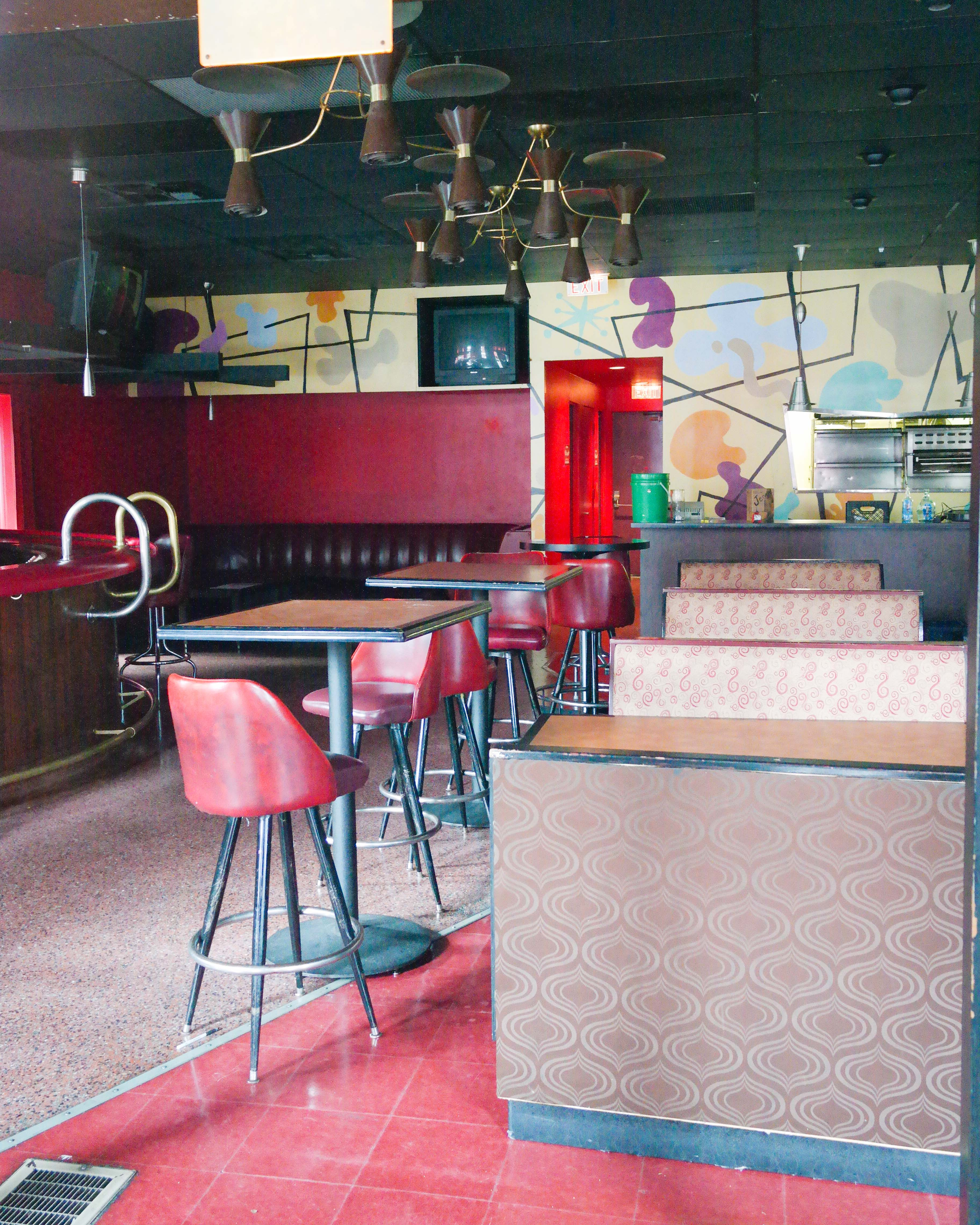
The restaurant's interior in 2014, shortly after closing

According to a 1973 Oregonian obituary, Gypsy Restaurant was then owned and operated by Stacy Gurganus. An obituary published by The Oregonian in 1987 said that Gertrude "Tiny" Hursick of Lake Oswego co-owned Gypsy and Gordon's 7-Up Bar, also located in Northwest Portland. John Hursick continued to own and operate the restaurant until the early 1990s; he died in 1999.

Ownership of Gypsy transferred to Concept Entertainment in 1992. The company has owned other Portland establishments such as Bar 71, Barracuda Nightclub, Dixie Tavern, Grand Central Bowl, the Lotus Cardroom and Cafe, Quest, and the Thirsty Lion. According to Willamette Week, the restaurant had an "odd" influence on local alcohol policies. In 1994, city commissioner Charlie Hales and mayor Vera Katz sought to close the Gypsy due to repeated reports of assaults, public intoxication, and noise complaints. However, the Oregon Liquor Control Commission (OLCC) refused. In 2013, when Hales was the mayor of Portland, he unsuccessfully requested that the OLCC enforce a 10 pm curfew for bar patios within the Portland city limits.

In 2007, Gypsy was one of several Portland sites depicted in "Virtual Portland", a three-dimensional computer-generated simulation of the city, designed for Second Life. In May 2013, a tree limb fell and damaged the restaurant.

After operating for more than twenty years, and despite having advertised future events at the club, the business closed abruptly on February 20, 2014. Its website and social media pages were shut down immediately, and a sign was posted at the club noting that Concept Entertainment had decided to sell. The space that Gypsy had occupied was immediately available for long-term lease, with furniture included.

== Events ==
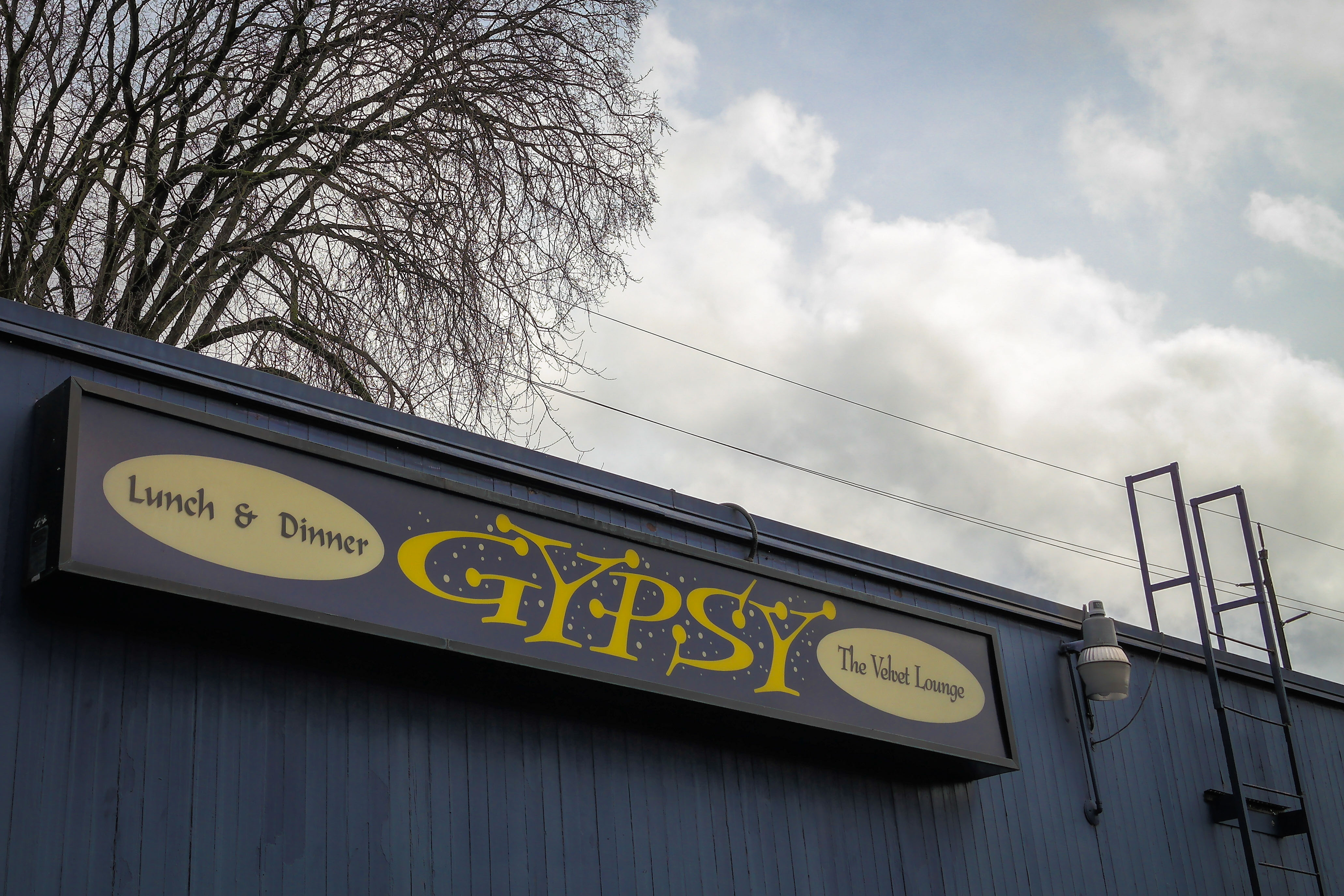
Exterior signage in 2014

Gypsy hosted a variety of musical acts and events throughout its history, including trivia competitions and rock band karaoke, featuring a live backing band. In 1985, the Chris Conrad Quartet performed in the "Rhythm Room". In 2000, Gypsy hosted opening and closing night parties for Sensory Perceptions' annual film festival, which spanned two weekends at neighboring Cinema 21. Nearly twenty years after the death of Andy Warhol, the Gypsy held a birthday party in his honor in 2006. One Oregonian contributor called Gypsy a "fitting setting" for the celebration, given its lava lamps and blue and orange fishbowl drinks, which he said were "like Pop art through a straw". Gypsy partnered with Cinema 21 in 2009 when the theater hosted "Can't Stop the Serenity", a benefit for Equality Now that included two screenings of the film Serenity (2005). Festivities included a costume contest, pub quiz, and Dr. Horrible's Sing-Along Blog karaoke. Pub Quiz USA hosted an "All 'Lost' Trivia Night" at the Gypsy in 2010 for fans of the television program Lost. Gypsy often screened episodes of Mad Men, the American television series set in the 1960s, and pay-per-view Ultimate Fighting Championship matches.

In an attempt to offer "something different and exciting to do", Gypsy began hosting goldfish racing tournaments in 2010. A chef who worked at Gypsy proposed hosting the tournaments after seeing videos of fish racing online. Two other establishments owned by Concept Entertainment also hosted goldfish races. Gypsy's cross-shaped track was 9 feet (2.7 m) long and "tricked out with fancy runway lights". The tournaments prompted criticism by a local veterinarian and a spokesperson for the Oregon Humane Society, who suggested they "may skirt the line of the humane society's guiding principle, which is to not inflict pain and suffering on animals for enjoyment". The spokesperson also said, "I do wish people could find different ways to entertain themselves."

== Reception ==
In 2009, The NW Examiner included Gypsy in an article about happy hours in Northwest Portland. In her review, Desiree Andrews wrote that the fried artichoke hearts and pub chips were forgettable and recommended the black bean quesadilla. She said, "Overall, the atmosphere was a little too much like a Big Lebowski hallucination for me, and the food triggered clogged-artery images, but the friendliness of the staff made up for a lot."

== See also ==
- Culture of Portland, Oregon
