= AMF Pro 300 Lanes =

Defunct bowling alley in Portland, Oregon, U.S.

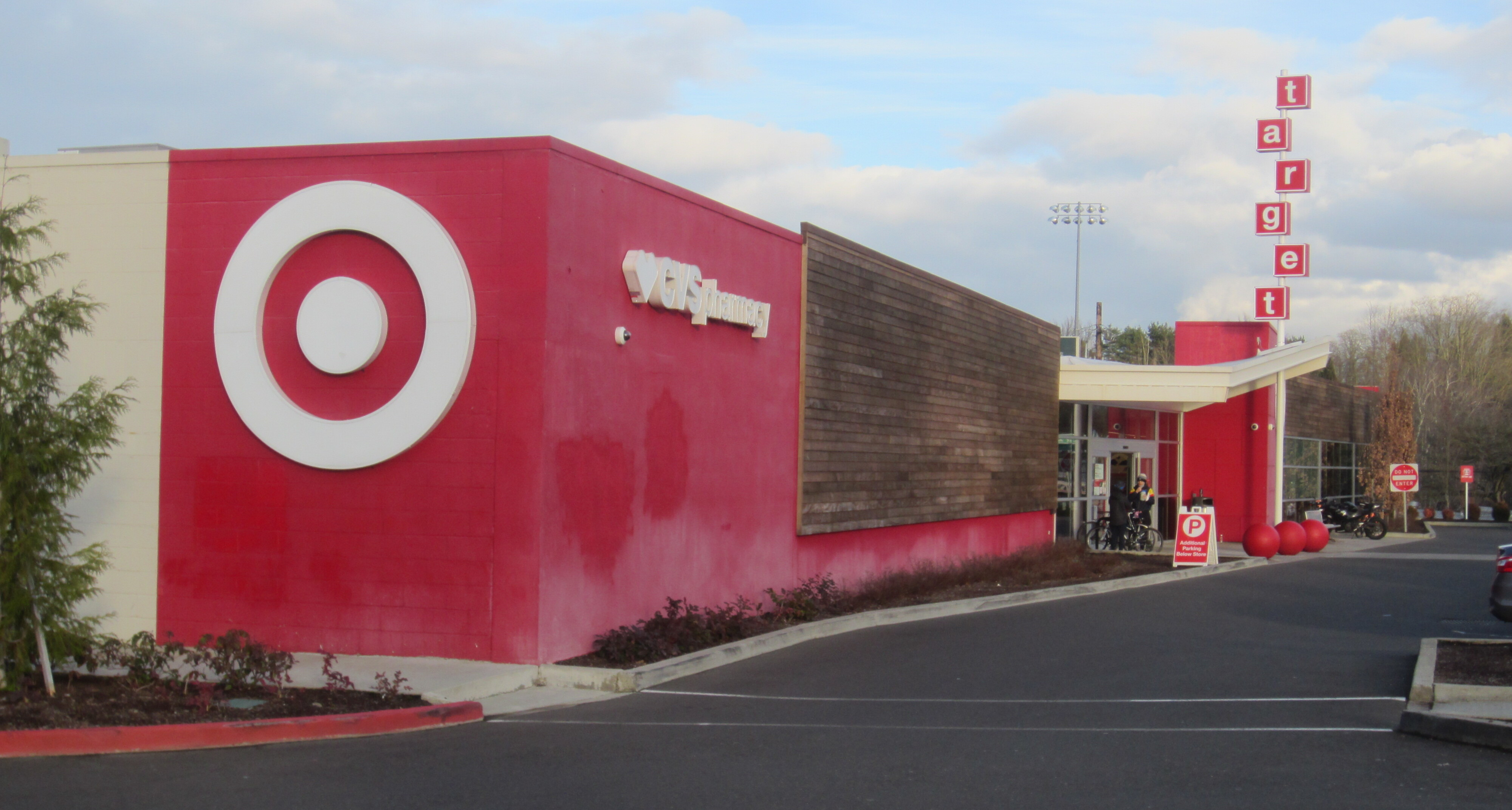
- Exterior of the Target store operating in the building that had previously housed the bowling alley, 2021
- Interactive map of AMF Pro 300 Lanes
- Address: Portland, Oregon; United States
- Coordinates: 45.4971°N 122.6341°W

AMF Pro 300 Lanes was a bowling alley in Portland, Oregon, United States.

== Description ==
AMF Pro 300 Lanes operated on Powell Boulevard at 30th Avenue in southeast Portland's Richmond neighborhood. The "old-school", "1950s-era" alley had 36 lanes and an arcade.

== History ==
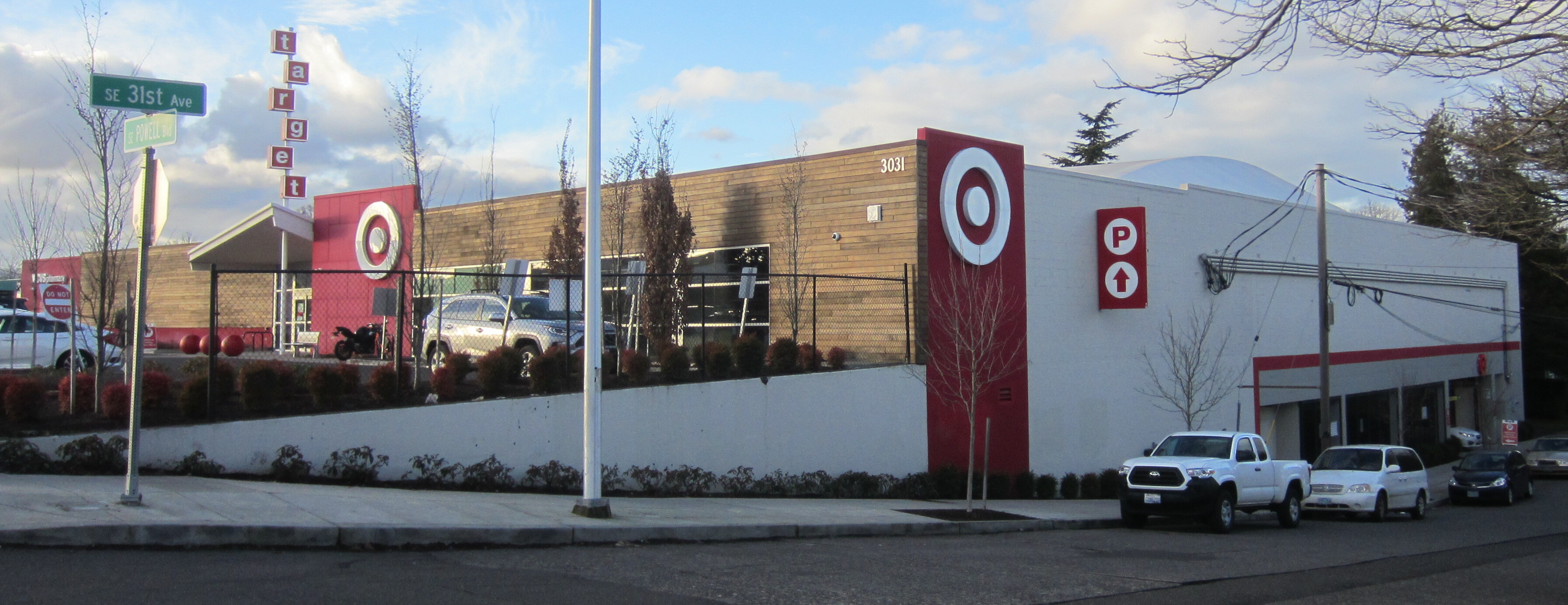
The Target store's exterior, 2021

A fire broke out in the alley on November 20, 2015.

In March 2017, media outlets began reporting on the alley's closure, renovation, and replacement with a Target store. MAJ Development Corporation had purchased the building from AMF Bowling Centers Inc for $4.8 million in 2016. Oregon Public Broadcasting said, "This facility is considered one of the last traditional bowling centers in Portland. It attracts customers who are really serious about the sport."

While there was some confusion over the announcement and plans, AMF Pro 300 closed permanently on September 17, 2017.

The Target location opened in 2018, incorporating nostalgic design features that "[tie] in the building's bowling alley history", according to KATU. The store closed permanently in 2023.

== See also ==
- Grand Central Bowl, another bowling alley in Portland, Oregon
