= Grand Central Public Market =

Historic building in Portland, Oregon, U.S.

- U.S. National Register of Historic Places
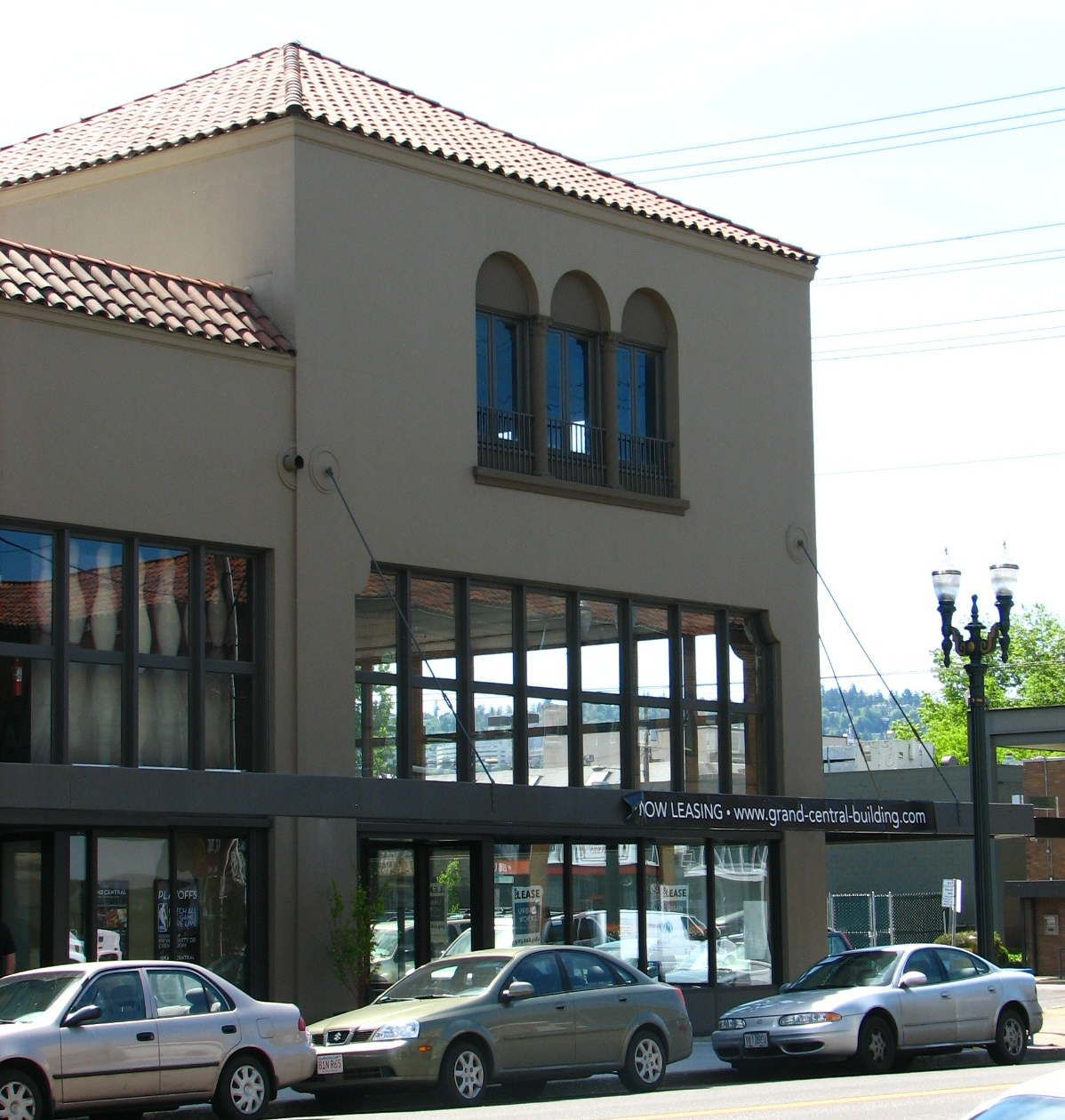
- Grand Central Public Market corner tower in 2008
- Location: 808 SE Morrison Street; Portland, Oregon
- Coordinates: 45°31′01″N 122°39′26″W
- Built: 1929
- Architect: Lee A. Thomas, Albert T. Mercier
- Architectural style: Mission/Spanish Revival
- MPS: Portland Eastside MPS
- NRHP reference No.: 06001034
- Added to NRHP: November 15, 2006

The Grand Central Public Market is a building in southeast Portland, Oregon. It was added to the National Register of Historic Places in 2006. The bowling alley Grand Central Bowl operates in the building.

== See also ==
- National Register of Historic Places listings in Southeast Portland, Oregon
