= Grand Central Bowl =

Bowling alley and restaurant in Portland, Oregon, U.S.

Grand Central Bowl & Arcade
- Logo

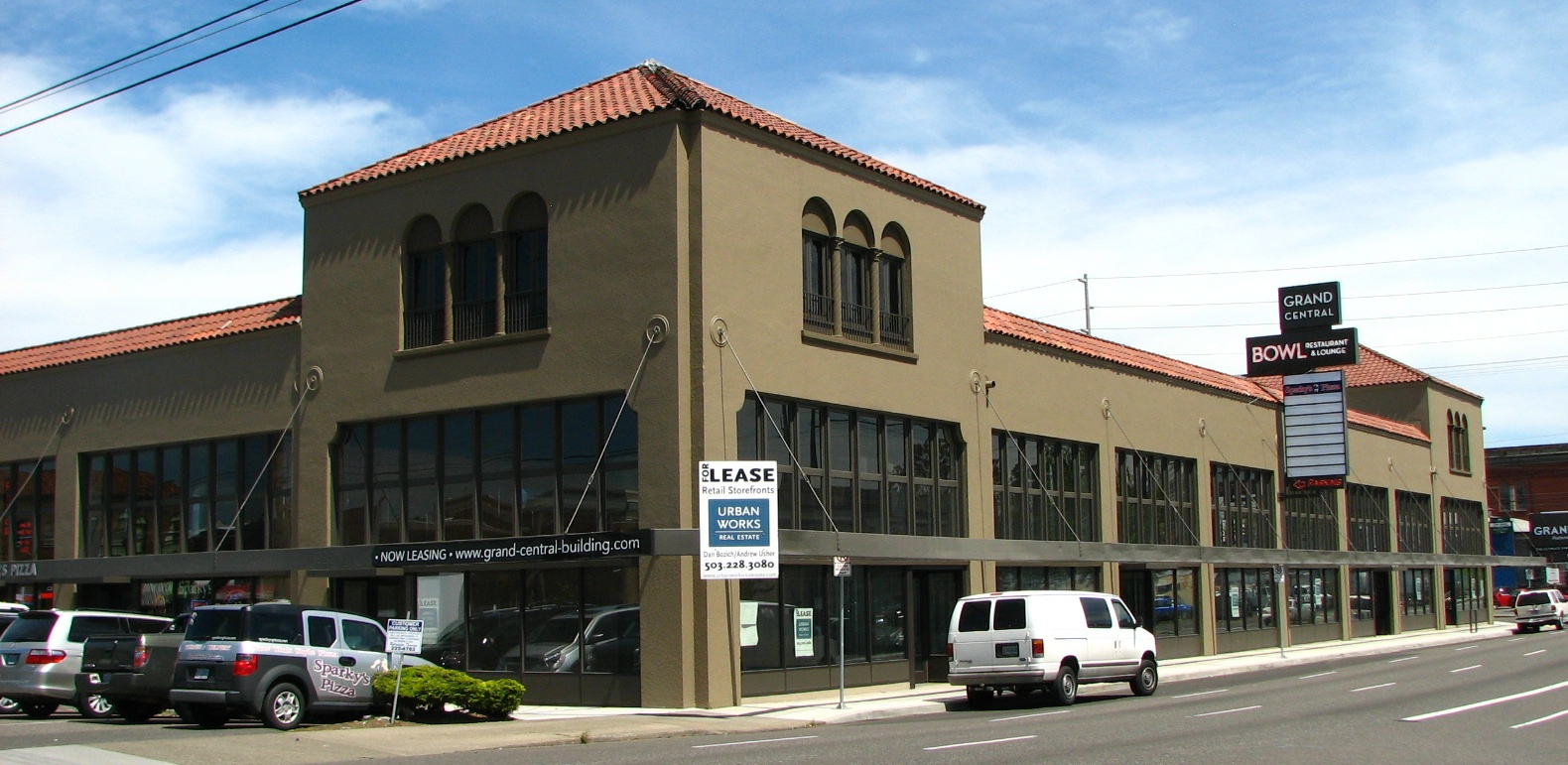
- The bowling alley operates in the Grand Central Public Market (pictured in 2008), which is listed on the National Register of Historic Places.
- Interactive map of Grand Central Bowl & Arcade
- Address: 808 Southeast Morrison Street; Portland, Oregon; United States
- Coordinates: 45.5171°N 122.6574°W

Website
- grandcentralbowl.com

Grand Central Bowl & Arcade, or simply Grand Central Bowl and sometimes Grand Central Bowling, is a bowling alley in Portland, Oregon, United States. It operates in the Grand Central Public Market, which is listed on the National Register of Historic Places, in southeast Portland's Buckman neighborhood. Grand Central Bowl has twelve lanes, serves food, and hosts events. It has been owned and operated by John Plew and Concept Entertainment. It is also known as Grand Central Restaurant and Bowling Lounge, as well as Central Bowl, Arcade, and Food Hall.

== Description ==
The bowling alley Grand Central Bowl (GCB) operates in the historic Grand Central Public Market building, which is listed on the National Register of Historic Places, in southeast Portland's Buckman neighborhood. GCB has twelve lanes and been described as "big", "modern", "shiny", and "swanky". There is an upstairs game room with air hockey, Pacman, Pop-A-Shot, shuffleboard, and Skee-Ball. GCB has large televisions and has hosted viewing parties for elections and sports events.

GCB also serves food and drinks. The menu has included multiple varieties of both burgers and macaroni and cheese, as well as kung pao chicken. According to Eater Portland, "During the height of the pandemic, Grand Central Bowl transformed its kitchen into a virtual food hall, or ghost kitchen, home to four separate concepts: Gastropub Thirsty Lion, taqueria Tortilla Sunrise, fried chicken spot Southern Jewel, and wing specialist Killer Wings." In 2022, the dine-in menu had "elements of all of those ghost kitchen restaurants". Food options include carnitas tacos, sushi, totchos, and gochujang wings, as well as alcoholic shakes, beer, cocktails, and wine.

== History ==
Exterior, 2026

In 2012, the bowling alley's bouncer was shot and killed. The crime remained unsolved as of 2022.

GCB launched a new menu and opened the upstairs game room in 2013. The business has hosted events such as the Lebowski Bash, a tribute to the 1998 film The Big Lebowski, in 2012.

The venue charged a 2% fee on customers unbeknownst to them until they received their bill. A lawsuit was filed over this practice and the venue settled a class action lawsuit in 2018.

In 2020, the business rebranded as Central Bowl, Arcade, and Food Hall.

== Reception ==
Maya MacEvoy included GCB in Eater Portland's 2022 overview of eateries for drinking and playing games.

== See also ==
- AMF Pro 300 Lanes, a defunct bowling alley in Portland, Oregon
