= NOLA Doughnuts =

Defunct doughnut shop in the U.S. state of Oregon

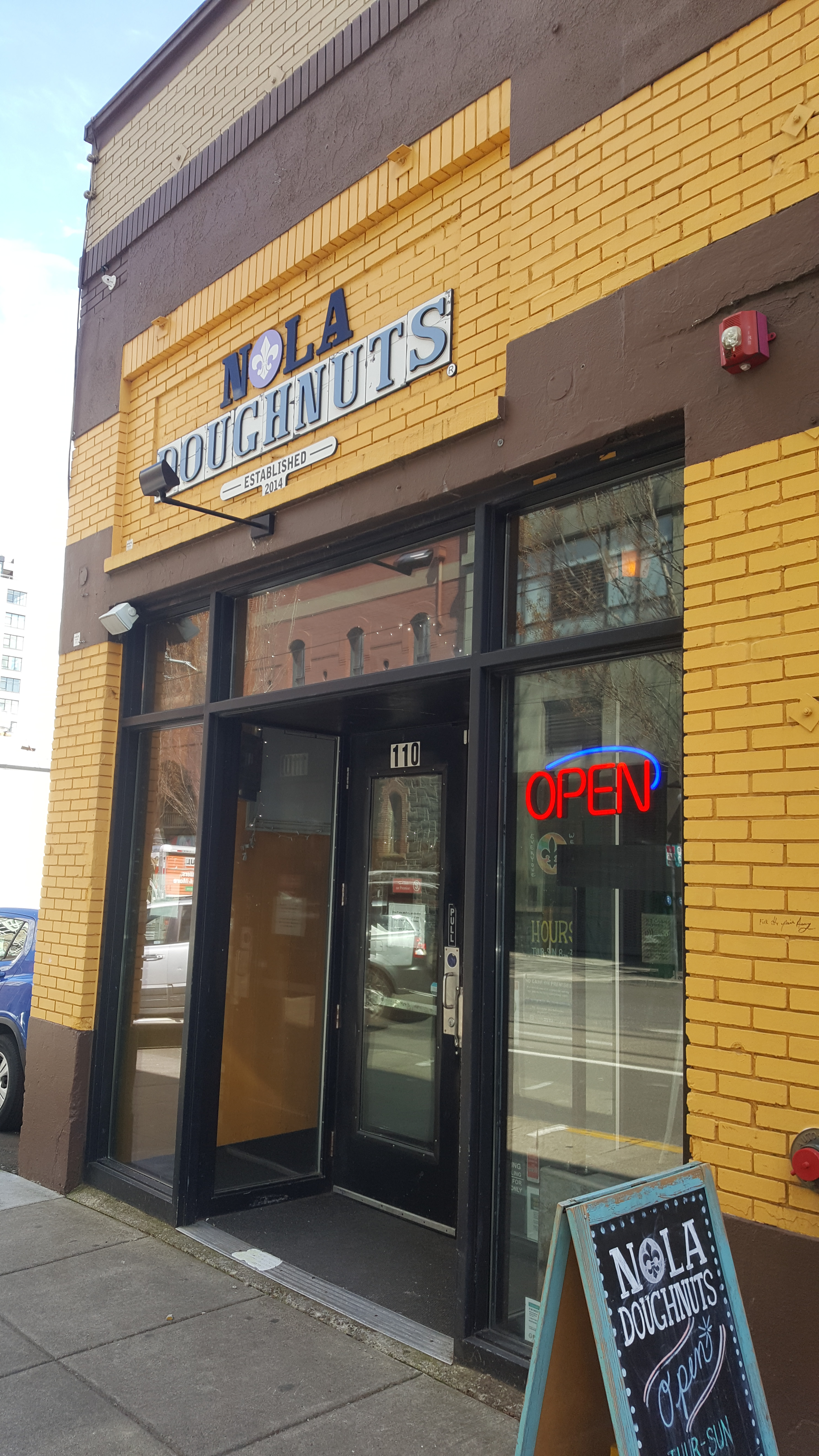
- Exterior of the restaurant in Portland, Oregon's Pearl District, 2022
- Interactive map of NOLA Doughnuts

Restaurant information
- Food type: Doughnuts
- Location: Lake Oswego; Portland; Beaverton, Oregon, United States
- Coordinates: 45.5238°N 122.6809°W
- Website: noladoughnuts.com

NOLA Doughnuts was a doughnut shop with three locations in the Portland metropolitan area, in the U.S. state of Oregon. The original shop opened in Lake Oswego in 2015, and a second opened in northwest Portland's Pearl District in 2018. A third location opened in Beaverton in 2022. All locations closed in January 2023.

== Description ==
The menu included beignets, café au lait, fritters, king cake, la'ssants, milkshakes, pralines, and ice cream sandwiches. The Portland shop had New Orleans-style décor and played jazz.

== History ==
The business was started by Rob Herkes, his sister Connie DeMerell, and third partner Frank Halpin. The trio sold products at the Beaverton Farmers Market before opening a brick and mortar store in Lake Oswego in October 2015.

The business expanded in March 2018, with a second shop in northwest Portland's Pearl District. In 2019, NOLA Doughnuts became part of the Underground Donut Tour. A third location opened in Beaverton in 2022.

All three locations closed in January 2023. An announcement said in part, "The slow rebound from the pandemic and the current economic conditions have led us to make this difficult decision."

== Reception ==
Janelle Lassalle included NOLA Doughnuts in Eater Portland's 2017 list of "11 Restaurants That Define Lake Oswego". Alex Frane included the business in Thrillist's 2021 list of "The Absolute Best Donut Shops in Portland".

== See also ==
- List of doughnut shops
