= Helen Bernhard Bakery =

Bakery in Portland, Oregon, U.S.

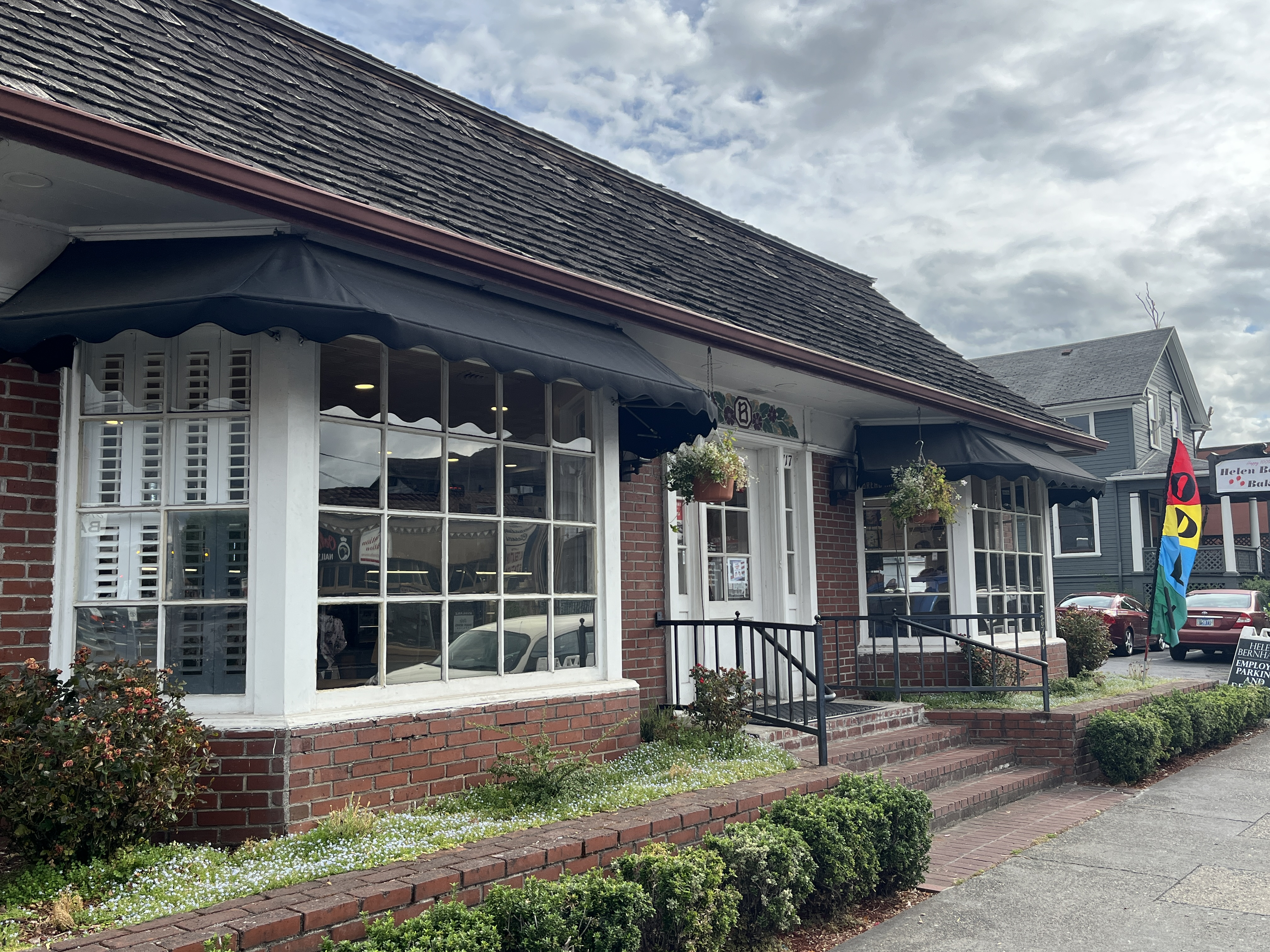
- The bakery's exterior, 2025
- Interactive map of Helen Bernhard Bakery

Restaurant information
- Established: 1924
- Location: 1717 Northeast Broadway #1775, Portland, Multnomah, Oregon, 97232, United States
- Coordinates: 45.5352°N 122.6481°W
- Website: helenbernhardbakery.com

Helen Bernhard Bakery is a bakery in Portland, Oregon, United States. It was established in 1924.

== Description ==
Helen Bernhard Bakery operates in a converted house at the intersection of 17th and Broadway, in northeast Portland's Irvington neighborhood. The bakery has served apple fritters, cinnamon rolls, muffins, cakes and cake doughnuts, sugar cookies, sourdough, and other pastries. The bakery has sold king cake for Mardi Gras, pumpkin cake for Halloween, and decorated sugar shortbread cookies during the holiday season.

== History ==
The bakery was established in 1924. Mike and Kellie Snaadt owned the business in 2020.

== See also ==
- List of bakeries
