= Reggie Houston =

American jazz musician (born 1947)

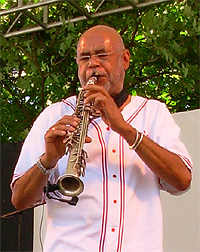
Houston performing in Portland, Oregon in 2006

Reggie Houston (born July 2, 1947, New Orleans, Louisiana, United States) is an American musician who plays soprano saxophone, tenor saxophone, alto saxophone and baritone saxophone. He is best known for his association with the New Orleans pianist Fats Domino.

== Early life ==
A seventh generation New Orleanian, Houston was born in New Orleans, Louisiana to Ralph Houston, a pianist and acoustic bassist, and Margarete Houston, who was both an educator and social activist. At the age of 10, Reggie Houston began studying the saxophone.

== Career ==
Houston's first professional gig came at the age of 12 when he joined the Batiste family band, The Gladiators, widely considered to be one of the pioneering bands of funk.

Houston continued to perform with The Gladiators throughout high school and while home on holiday from his undergraduate studies at Southern University and Xavier University of Louisiana. Although performing jazz, blues and funk throughout New Orleans during this time, it was forbidden to practice these musical styles in any African American university in the United States.

After returning from fighting in the Vietnam War, Houston learned that his former Southern University music professor, Alvin Batiste had just begun a jazz program at Southern University. Houston made a phone call to Southern University and one day later was studying with Alvin Batiste in the country's first university jazz program . (Years later Houston returned to Southern to reunite with the former students of that class, and to be inducted into The Music Hall of Fame at Southern University where Alvin Batiste worked until his death in 2007.)

While Houston was preparing for graduation from Southern, Batiste was being consulted about the organization of the first annual New Orleans Jazz & Heritage Festival. Alvin convinced Quint Davis (who would become the main creative force behind the festival) to hire some of the graduate students from Southern's jazz program. Upon his graduation in 1973, Houston returned to New Orleans and was immediately put to work in the jazz tent at The New Orleans Jazz and Heritage Festival. Over the next ten years Houston became an integral part of the festival, and as a paid employee of the festival, he worked as stage manager, booking agent, and emcee.

While working for the festival, Houston continued to gig with artists like New Orleans' soul queen Irma Thomas.

In 1982, Houston joined The Survivors, whose other original core members included keyboardist Sam Henry, drummer Zigaboo Modeliste, The Neville Brothers, Charmaine Neville, and Ramsy McLean. Other players with The Survivors included guitar virtuoso Steve Masakowski, drummer Ricky Sebastian, Bobby McFerrin, and a teenaged Harry Connick Jr.

In 1983, Houston joined The Fats Domino Band, and aside from a three-year hiatus that began in 1988, was a permanent member of Fats' band for the next 22 years.

During that hiatus, Dr. John, with whom Houston occasionally gigged in New Orleans, offered Houston the baritone saxophone role in his band. But by that time Houston, who had been playing sax with Charmaine Neville, had accepted her offer to lead her band, which he did until moving to Portland, Oregon in 2004. Other collaborators in the Charmaine Neville Band included pianist, Amasa Miller and drummer, Raymond Weber.

Today Houston lives in Portland, Oregon, where he is an arts educator and continues to gig regularly with The Charmaine Neville Band and his own bands, The Box of Chocolates, The Earth Island Band, The Crescent City Connection, and The Reggie Houston Arkestra.

== Recording credits ==
- 2010 - "Homage 1" by Reggie Houston, featuring Grammy nominated pianist Janice Scroggins
- 2009 - "Bridges" by Mary Flower.
- 2006 - "The Katrina Sessions" by Matthew Voth, with guest musician Reggie Houston
- 2004 - "Doctors, Professors, Kings & Queens: Big Ol' Box of New Orleans" Shout! Factory's mammoth 4 disc collection that covers the full range of Crescent City music, from R&B to jazz, zydeco and funk.
- 2003 - "Louisiana Night" by Jimmy "Bean" Ballero, with guest musician Reggie Houston
- 2003 - "Makin' Groceries" by Reggie Houston and Friends
- 2001 - "Fats Domino Live! (Shout)" Recorded live in 2001 at The New Orleans Jazz & Heritage Festival
- 2001 - "Guthro" by Bruce Guthro
- 2001 - "Sisters on the Riverbed" by Nanaco
- 2000 - "Urgin' For The Virgin" by Reggie Houston's Earth Island Band
- 2000 - "Mardi Gras Mambo" by Cubanismo
- 2000 - "As Long as You're Living Yours: The Music of Keith Jarrett"
- 1999 - "Wordless Praise The Gospel Saxophone of Reggie Houston" with Ezekiel Williams on organ & piano, Damian Brown on piano, organ & synthesizer, Cornell Williams on bass, and Jeffrey Alexander drums. Produced by Mark Bingham
- 1999 - "Come On Now Social" by The Indigo Girls. Reggie appears on track 6 "Peace Tonight" along with guest vocalist Joan Osborne
- 1999 - "Dew Drop Out" by The Yockamo All-Stars
- 1999 - "Little Red Wagon" by Ramsey & Vaan, Reggie appears as a guest musician on track 1 "The Lady I Hated to Lose"
- 1997 - "The Best of Austin City Limits: Legends of Country Music"
- 1996 - "Up Up Up" by The Charmaine Neville Band
- 1996 - "StarGeezer" by Spider John Koerner
- 1994 - "Gazebo Sessions" by The Reggie Houston-Amasa Miller Trio
- 1992 - "It's About Time" by The Charmaine Neville Band
- 1992 - "Us" by Peter Gabriel, Reggie plays on track 6 "Washing of the Water" and Grammy nominated track 4 "Steam" which topped Billboard's Album Rock Tracks chart for 5 weeks.
- 1992 - "Coincidence and Likely Stories" by Buffy Sainte-Marie
- 1990 - "Brother's Keeper" by The Neville Brothers
- 1988 - "Creole Nightingale" by Tim Williams
- 1988 - "Ed Frank Quintet/Ramsey McLean & The Survivors - New New Orleans Music: Jump Jazz"
- 1986 - "Fats Domino: His Greatest Hits" Recorded live at the Universal Amphitheatre, Los Angeles on August 22, 1985
