= Crossroads Kitchen =

Vegan restaurant in Los Angeles

Coordinates: 34.083518°N 118.370137°W

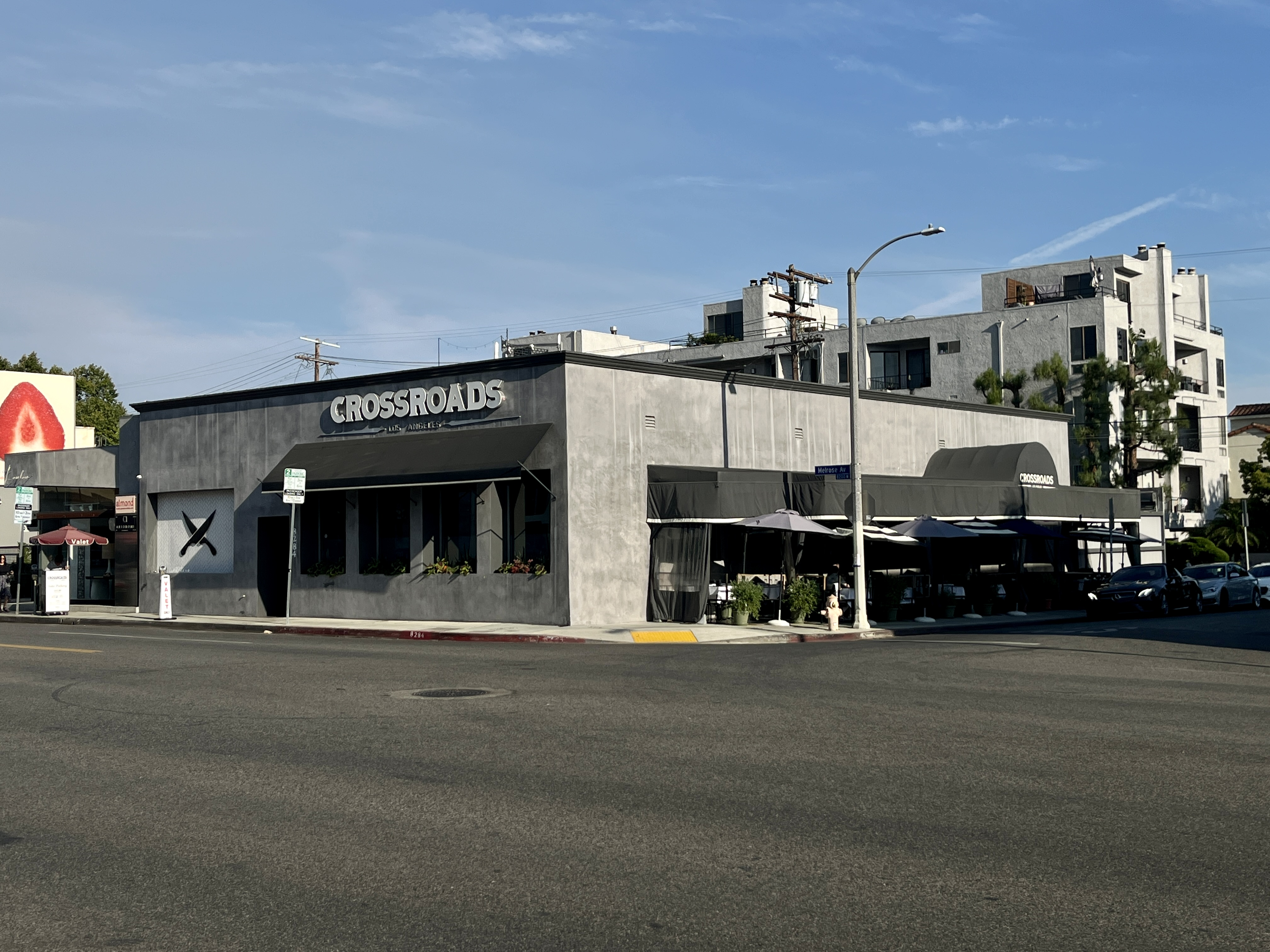
- Interactive map of Crossroads Kitchen

Restaurant information
- Established: 2013
- Chef: Tal Ronnen, Scot Jones
- Pastry chef: Serafina Magnussen
- Food type: Vegan, Mediterranean
- Location: 8284 Melrose Ave, Los Angeles, California, 90046, United States
- Website: crossroadskitchen.com

Crossroads Kitchen is a vegan fine-dining restaurant with locations in the San Fernando Valley, the Beverly Grove neighborhood of Los Angeles, and Las Vegas.

== History ==
Crossroads was opened in 2013 in the Beverly Grove neighborhood by chef Tal Ronnen. According to Los Angeles magazine, the majority of customers are non-vegan.

In the 2020s the organization opened two additional locations, one in Las Vegas and one in Calabasas, California.

== Food ==
The restaurant has a Mediterranean focus and a small-plates format. Soy foods such as tempeh and tofu are not offered, as soybeans aren't a Mediterranean product. Signature dishes include a "seafood" tower and artichoke "oysters".

=== Kite Hill cheeses ===
Ronnen also cofounded Kite Hill, a producer of vegan cheeses.

== Reception ==
In 2013, Travel + Leisure named Crossroads Kitchen one of the best vegetarian restaurants in the U.S. That same year, Patric Kuh of Los Angeles magazine critiqued that he wished the restaurant "did more with raw ingredients and, ironically enough, with vegetables," and that the legume dishes lacked inspiration. In 2014 Relish named them one of the 15 best vegan and vegetarian restaurants in the U.S. In 2015, PETA named them one of the six best vegan fine-dining restaurants in the U.S. and BuzzFeed named them one of 24 "bucket list" vegan restaurants.

In 2017, Tasting Table named Crossroads Kitchen one of the eight best vegan restaurants in the U.S. and The Daily Meal named them one of the best vegan restaurants in the United States. In 2018 USA Today named them one of the ten best vegan restaurants in the country. In 2019, Big 7 Travel named them one of 50 best vegan-friendly restaurants in the world.

Oprah Winfrey called Crossroads owner and chef Tal Ronnen "America's best vegan chef" after he "helped her prep for her 21-day vegan challenge, when she also gave up sugar, gluten and alcohol." Vogue called his cuisine, "as flavorful as it gets."

== See also ==
- List of vegetarian and vegan restaurants
