= The Meatball Shop =

Restaurant in New York City

Coordinates: 40.72161°N 73.98880°W

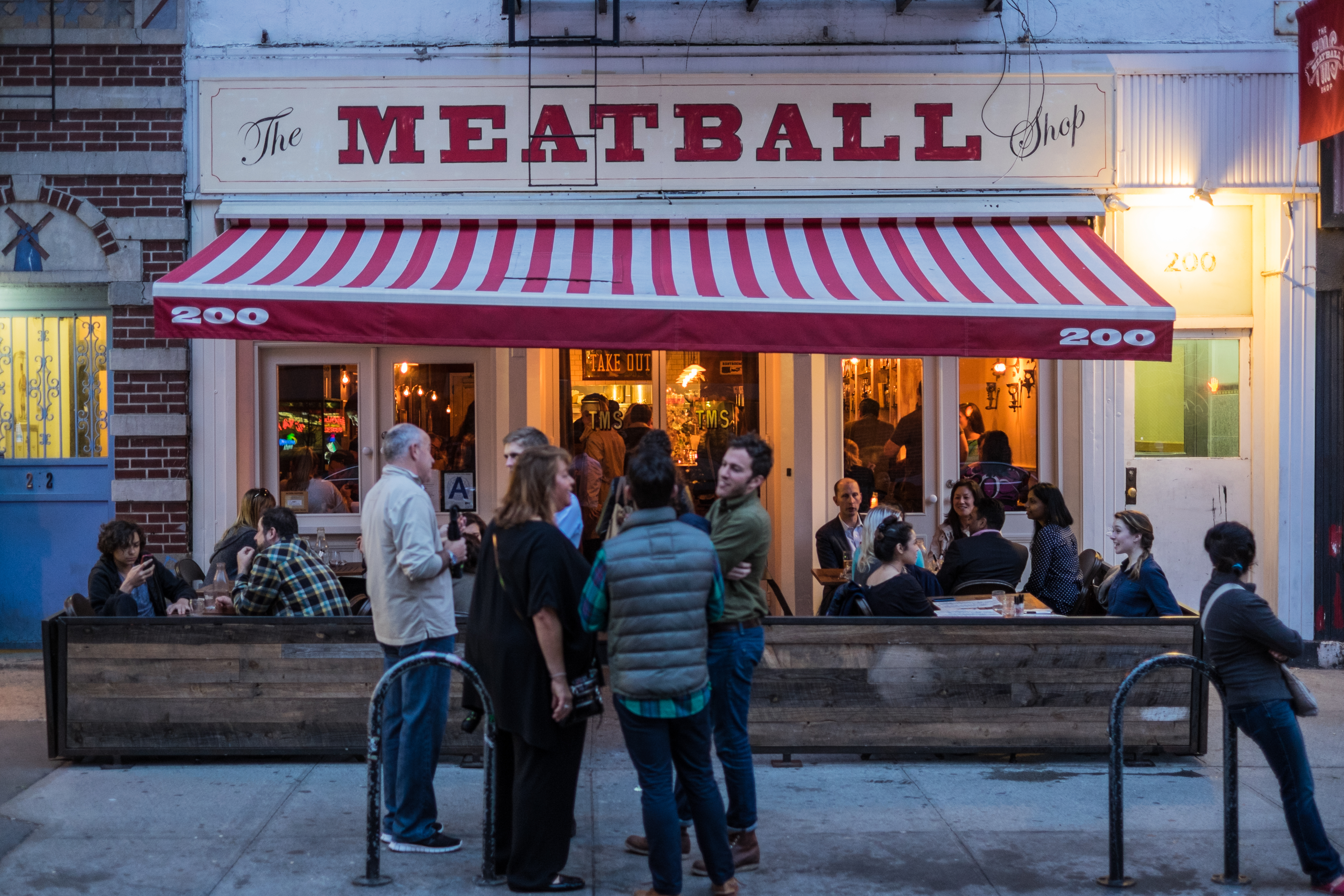
- Interactive map of The Meatball Shop
- Location within Manhattan Location within New York City Location within New York Location within the United States

Restaurant information
- Owners: Daniel Holzman and Michael Chernow
- Head chef: Daniel Holzman
- Location: New York City, New York, New York, United States
- Website: www.themeatballshop.com

The Meatball Shop was a New York City based restaurant owned and operated by native New Yorkers Daniel Holzman and Michael Chernow, who met as teenagers when they worked together as delivery boys at the New York vegan restaurant Candle Cafe.

== Overview ==
Daniel Holzman is the “executive chef” at The Meatball Shop. He attended The Culinary Institute of America. and is an alum of Le Bernardin, San Francisco’s Fifth Floor, and Aqua.

Michael Chernow runs the creative side of the business, focusing on marketing and branding. He has worked extensively in restaurants in New York and Los Angeles. He is a graduate of the French Culinary Institute, where he earned degrees in culinary arts and restaurant management.

== Locations ==
The last Meatball Shop was located in Hell's Kitchen down from a high of eight locations at its peak in popularity. It closed its doors on March 28th, 2026. Covid, mismanagement in marketing, increases in rent, and a decrease in people going to restaurants are the primary reason for closures.

== Cookbook ==
Michael and Daniel released The Meatball Shop Cookbook, published by Ballantine Books, on November 1, 2011. It was co-written by Lauren Deen.
