= The Uncanny =

The Uncanny or Uncanny may refer to:

- Uncanny, a Freudian concept
- "The Uncanny", a 1919 essay by Sigmund Freud
- The Uncanny (bar), Portland, Oregon
- The Uncanny (film), a British-Canadian 1977 film
- Uncanny (film), a 2015 American science fiction film
- Uncanny (short story collection), a 1988 book by Paul Jennings
- Uncanny Magazine, an online magazine of fantasy and science fiction
- Uncanny (franchise), a BBC Sounds podcast and BBC Two TV show in the UK hosted by Danny Robins
