= ABCV =

Restaurant in New York City, U.S.

abcV
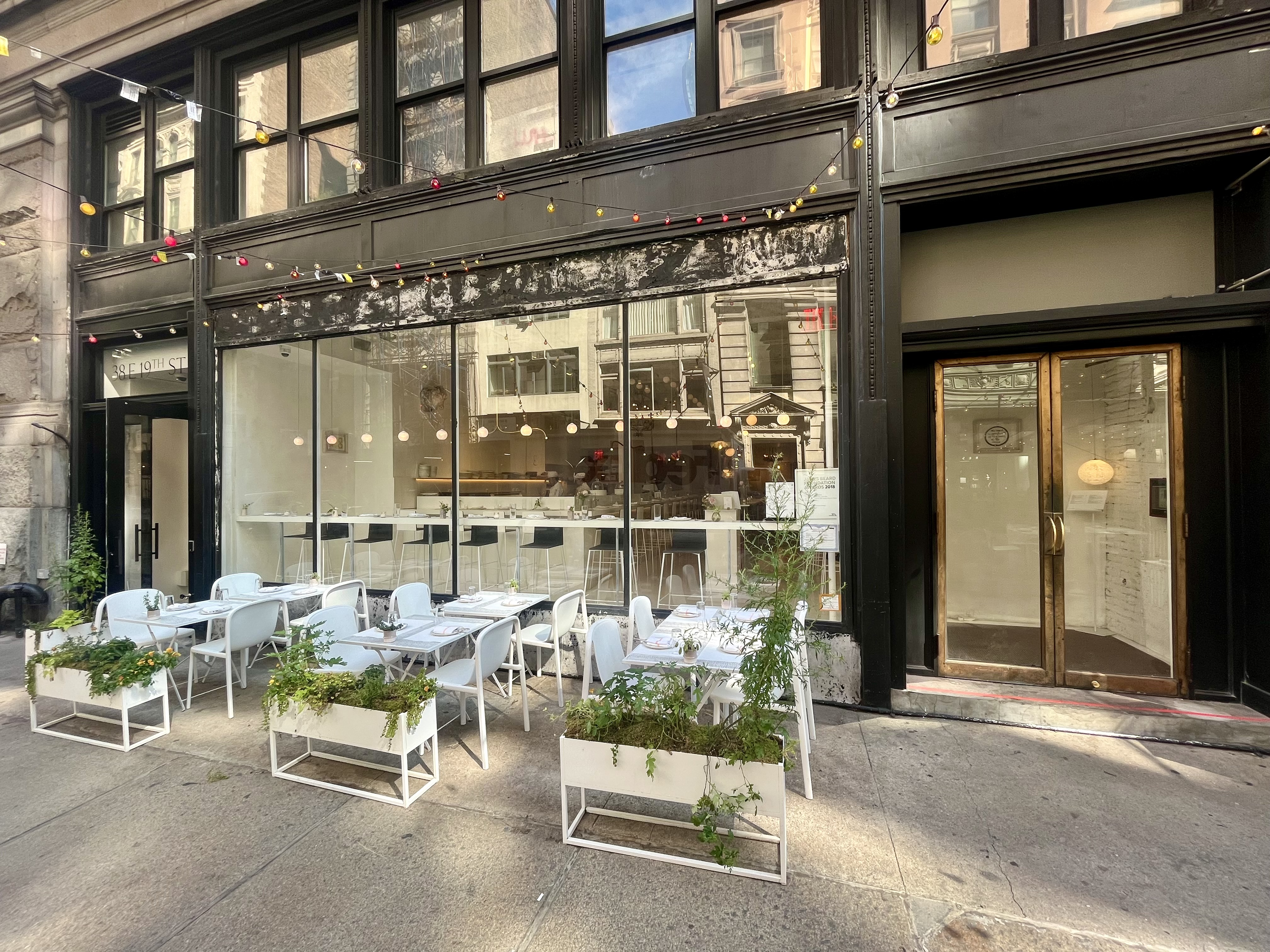
- The restaurant's exterior in 2024
- Interactive map of abcV

Restaurant information
- Established: February 27, 2017
- Food type: American; vegetarian
- Location: 38 East 19th Street, New York City, New York, 10003, United States
- Coordinates: 40°44′17″N 73°59′21″W
- Other locations: 96 South Street
- Website: www.abcv.nyc

abcV (or ABCV) is a restaurant in the Flatiron District of Manhattan in New York City. The restaurant serves American and vegetarian cuisine. A second location opened in 2023, which is located in the Tin Building at the South Street Seaport.

== See also ==
- List of vegetarian and vegan restaurants
