= Elizabeth's Gone Raw =

Vegan restaurant in Washington, D.C., U.S.

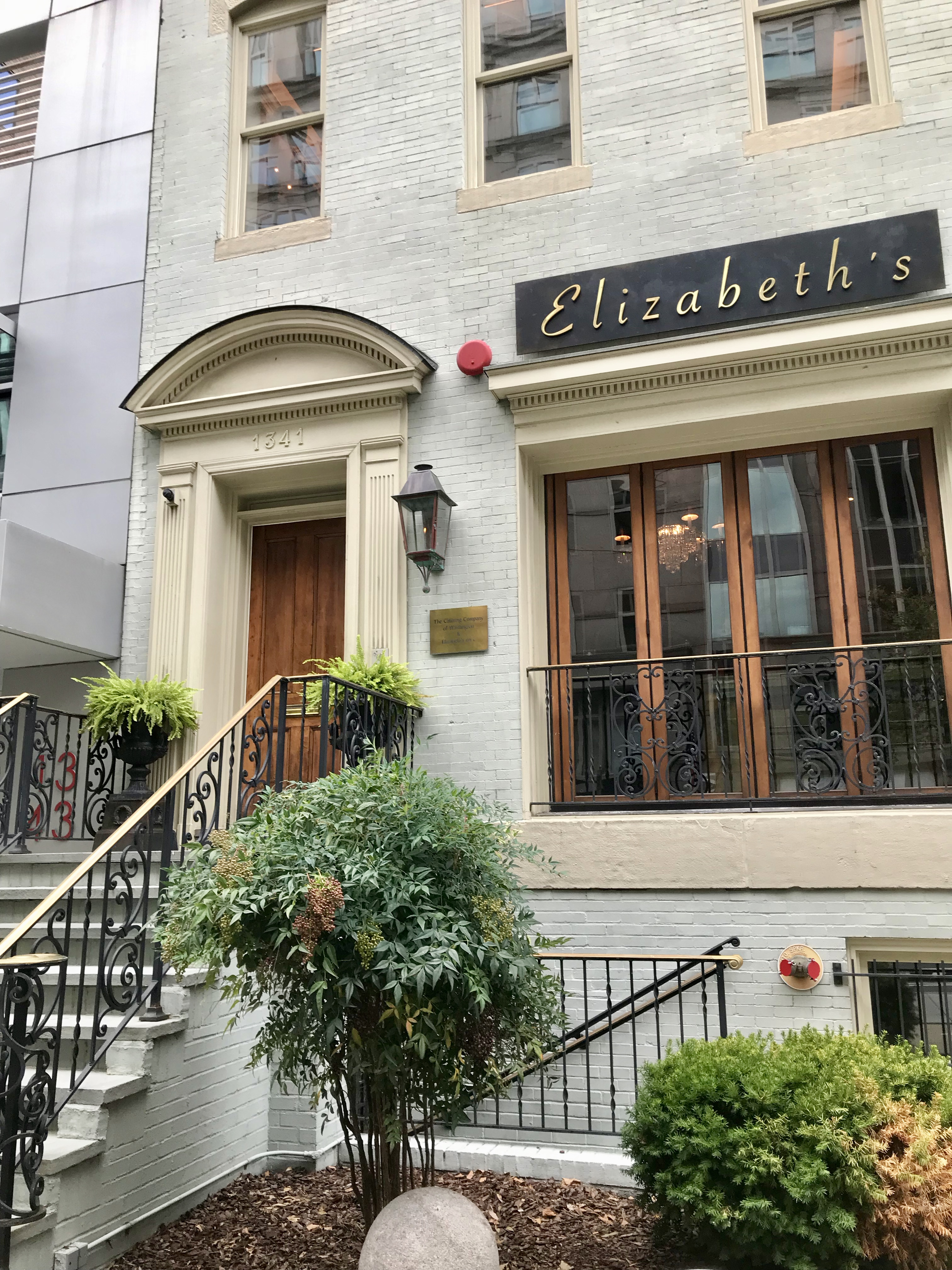
- Elizabeth's Gone Raw in Washington, DC
- Interactive map of Elizabeth's Gone Raw

Restaurant information
- Owner: Elizabeth Petty
- Chef: Francisco Hernandez
- Food type: Vegan
- Location: 1341 L St. NW, Washington, D.C., 20005, United States
- Coordinates: 38.90392°N 77.03126°W
- Seating capacity: 56
- Website: www.elizabethsgoneraw.com

Elizabeth's, formerly Elizabeth's Gone Raw, is a vegan fine dining restaurant in Washington, D.C. The restaurant has been named as one of the best vegan restaurants in the world.

The restaurant opened as an "occasional restaurant" in July 2010 on the second floor of a row house, serving three Friday nights per month. In September 2018 it added Saturday night service. It serves only a prix fixe seven-course tasting menu. In addition to being vegan, much of the food is also raw. The menu changes monthly.

== Reception ==
The restaurant and its menu have been favorably reviewed and widely praised. Food & Wine listed it as one of 19 best vegetarian and vegan restaurants in the US. The Washington Post called it "an upscale vegan dinner party." Washington Life magazine called the vegan tasting menu a masterpiece. Food Network named them one of the top 20 vegan restaurants in the United States.

In 2024, then-Washington Wizards offensive coach Joseph Blair said Elizabeth's was one of his favorite Washington, D.C. area restaurants. In 2019, Big 7 Travel named it one of 50 best vegan-friendly restaurants in the world. In 2018 Eater named it the best vegan restaurant in D.C. and Modern Farmer named it one of the 15 best vegan restaurants in the US. In 2017 the Evening Standard named it one of the 18 best vegan restaurants in the world and Tasting Table named it one of the eight best vegan restaurants in the US. In 2015 PETA named them one of the six best vegan fine-dining restaurants in the U.S. and BuzzFeed named it one of 24 "bucket list" vegan restaurants. In 2014 Relish named it one of the 15 best vegan and vegetarian restaurants in the U.S.

== Gallery ==
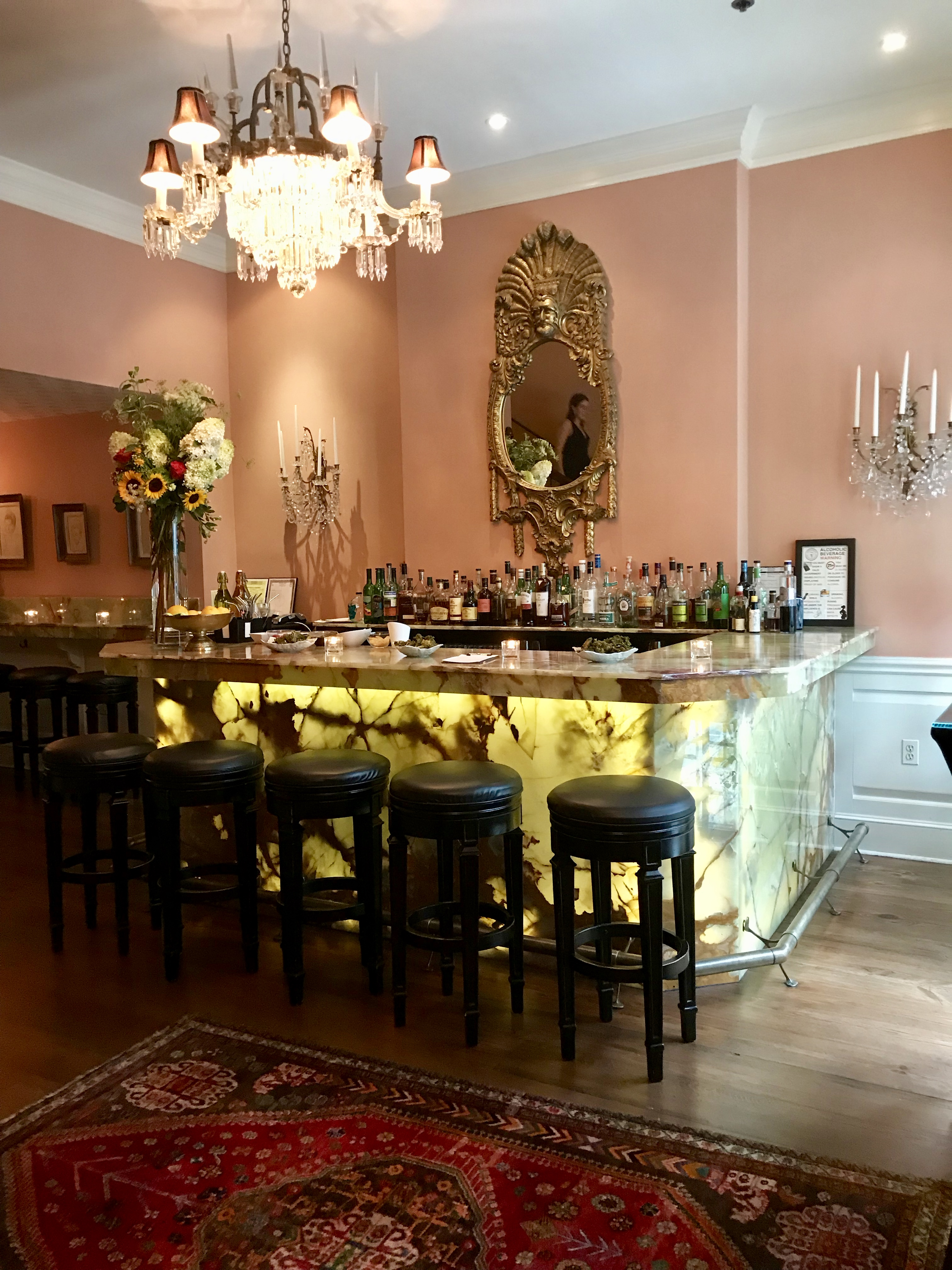
Bar

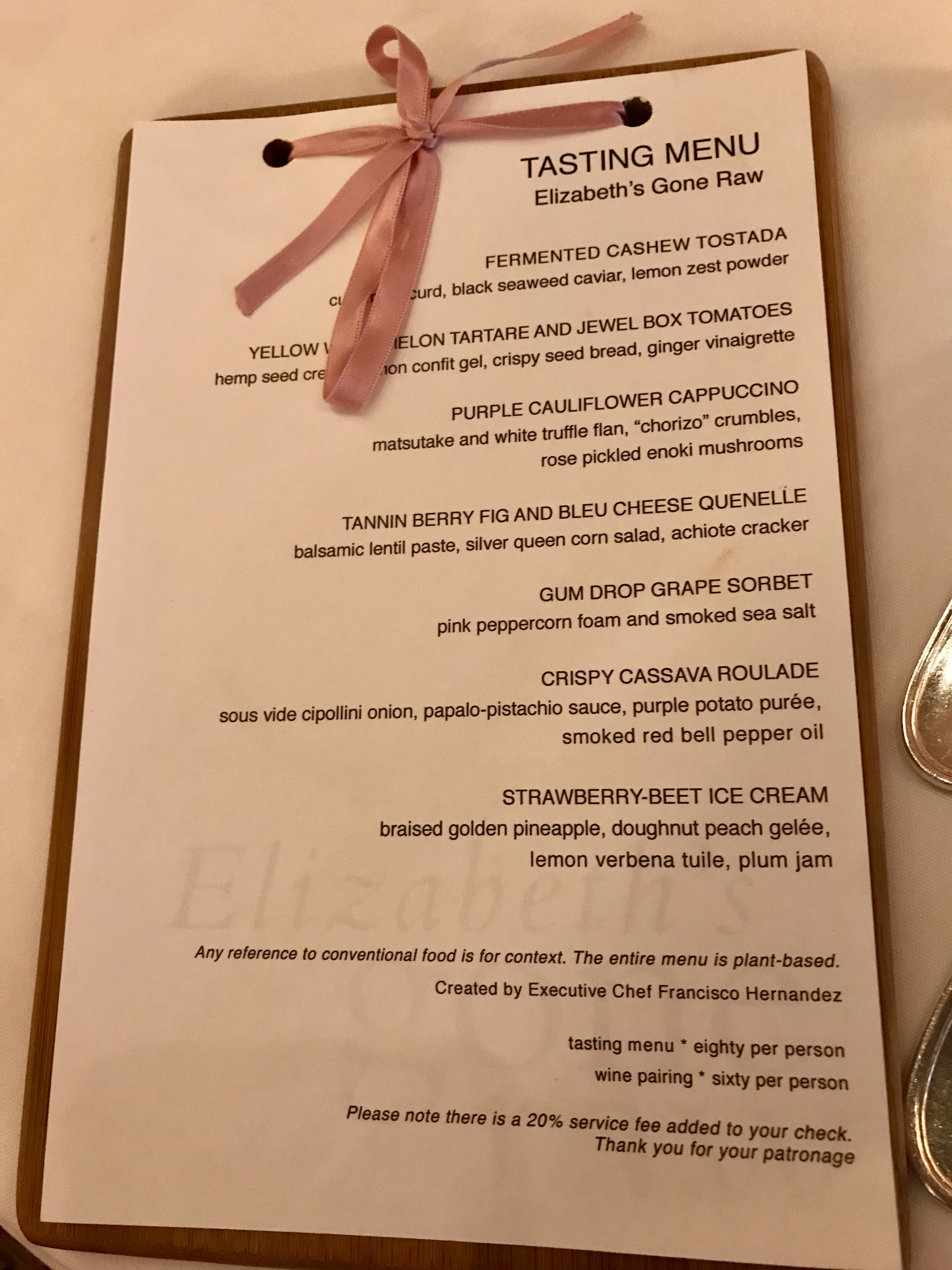
Menu for August 25, 2019

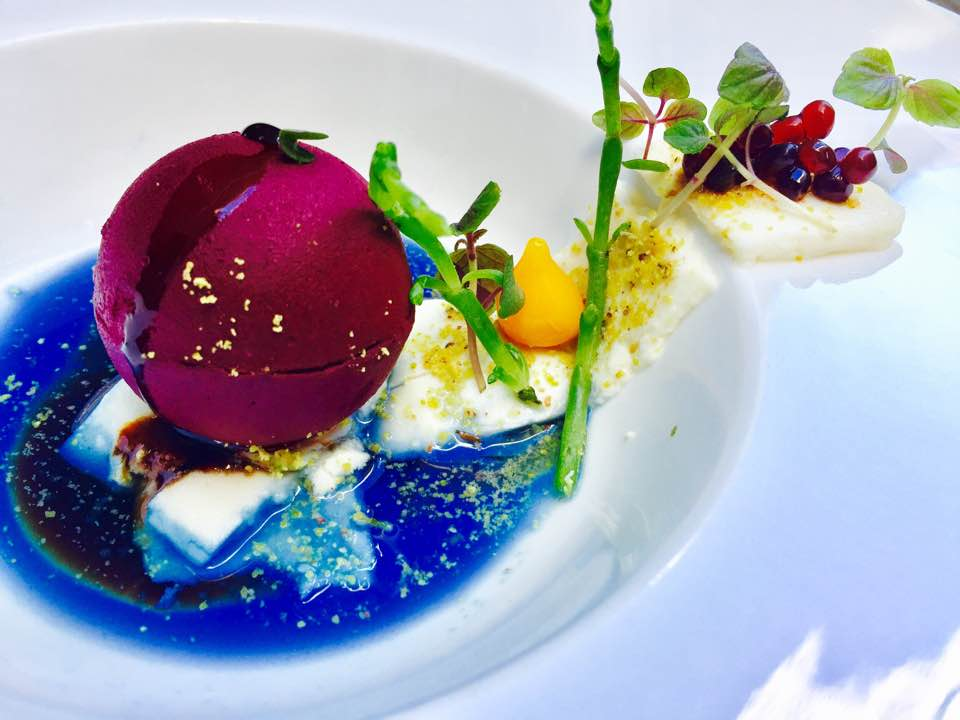
Beet sphere with butterfly pea tea

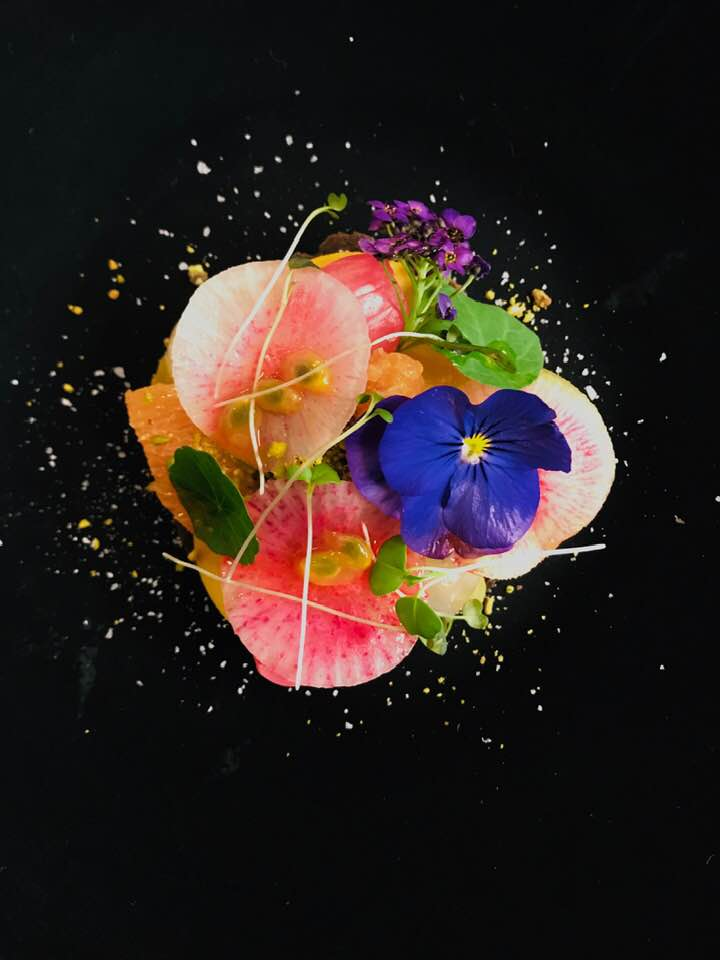
Watermelon radish, passion fruit, and citrus salad topped with edible flowers and pistachios

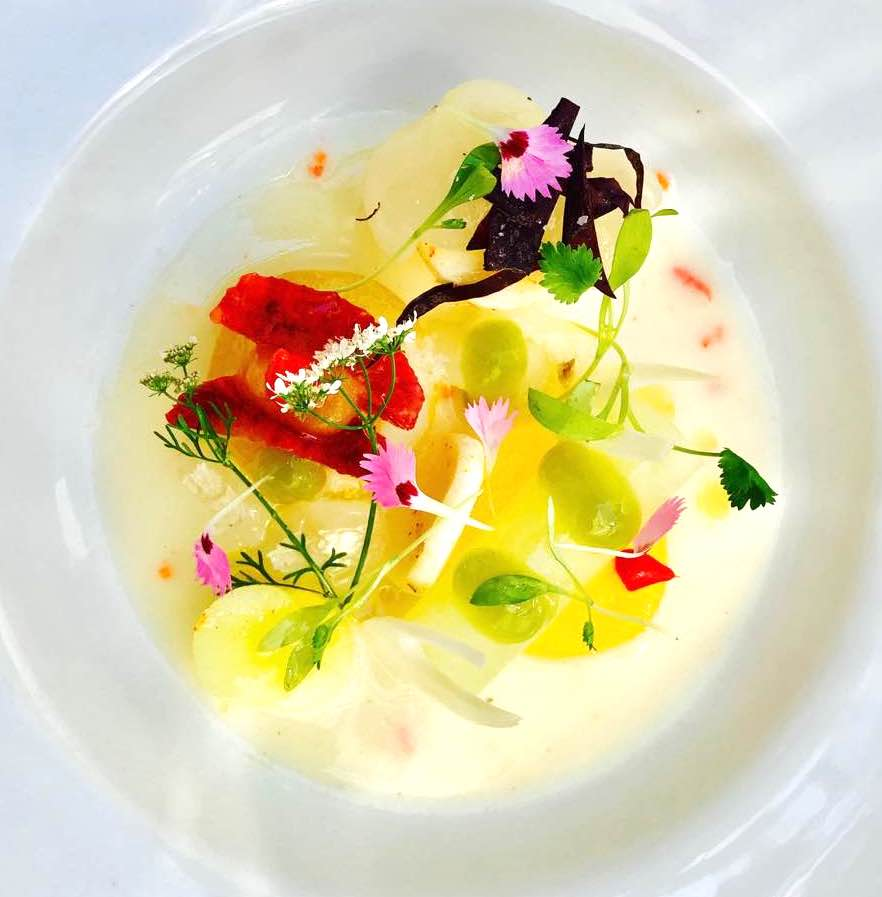
Parsnip and almond milk soup topped with edible flowers

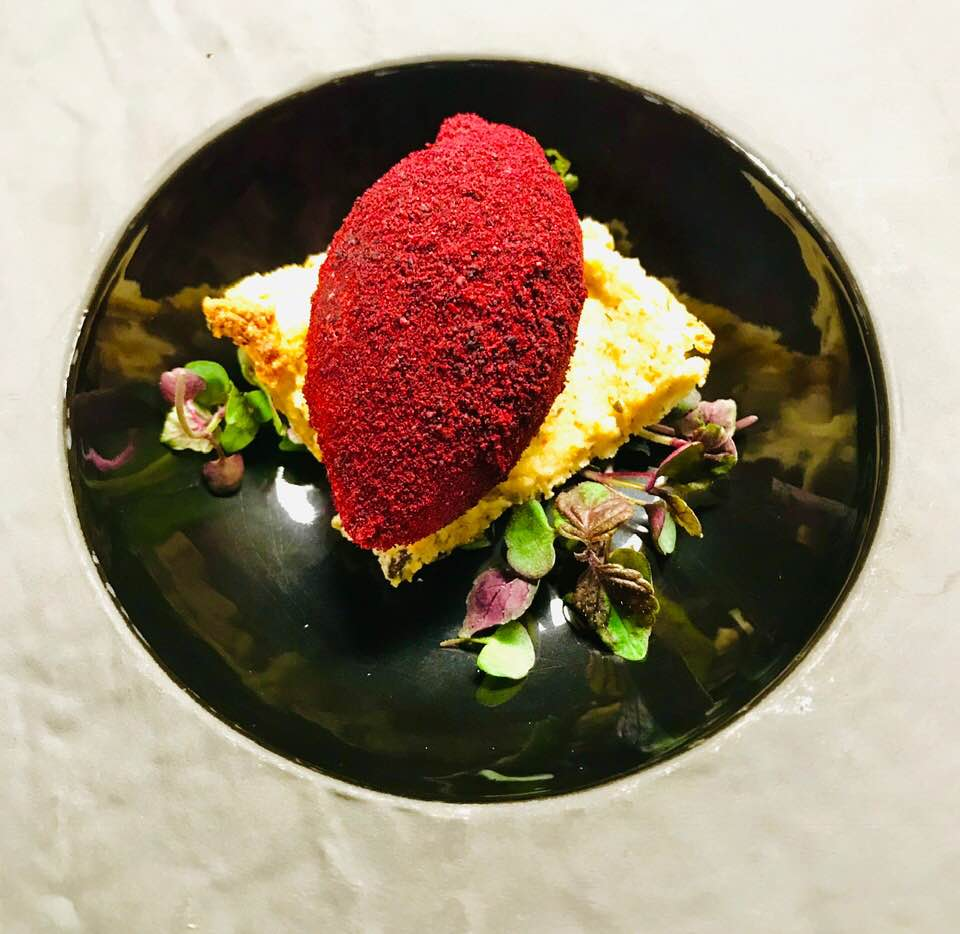
Chestnut quenelle rolled in beet powder

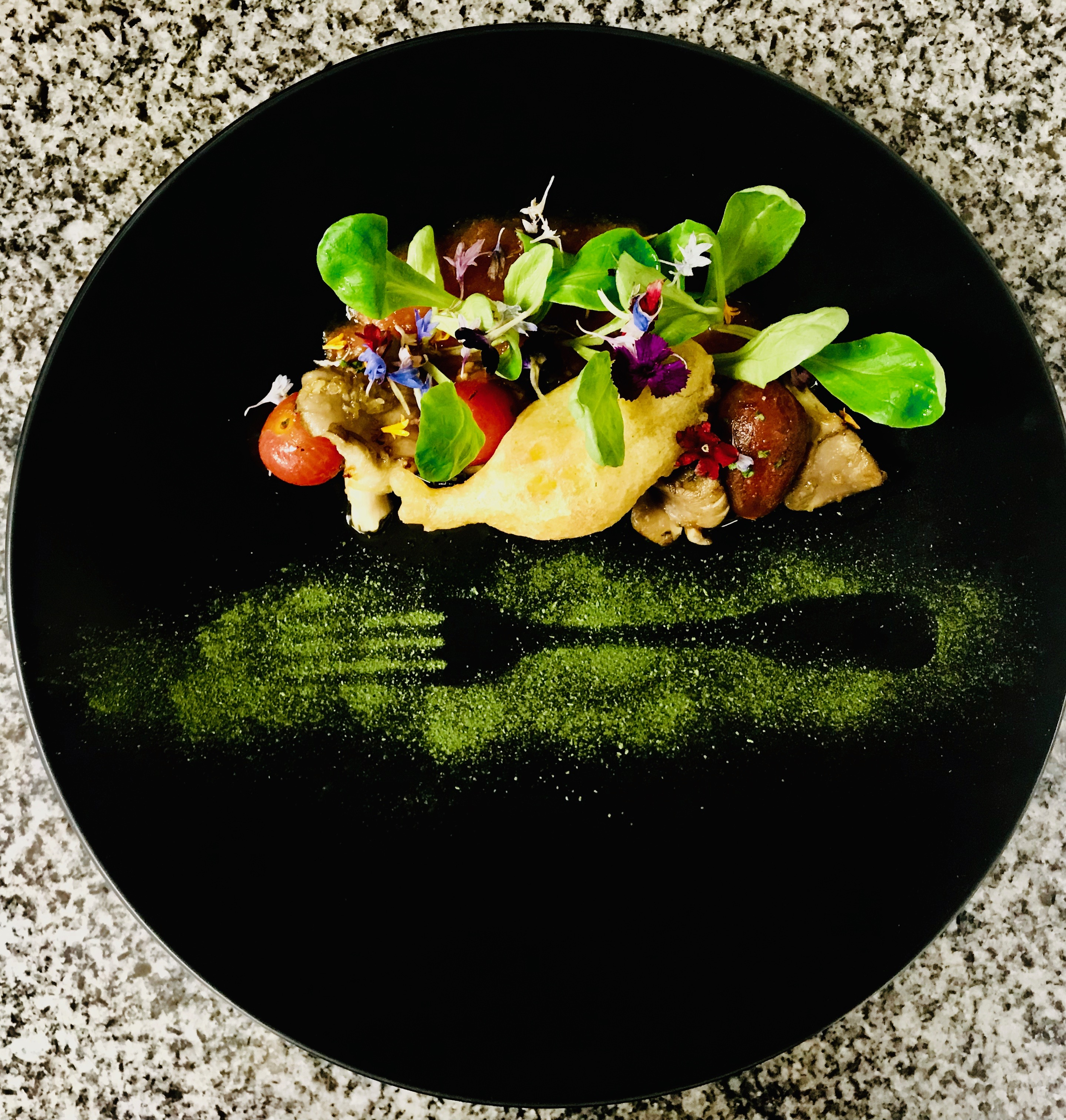
Chimichurri marinated Chinese eggplant topped with a crispy squash blossom filled with vegan mozzarella cheese

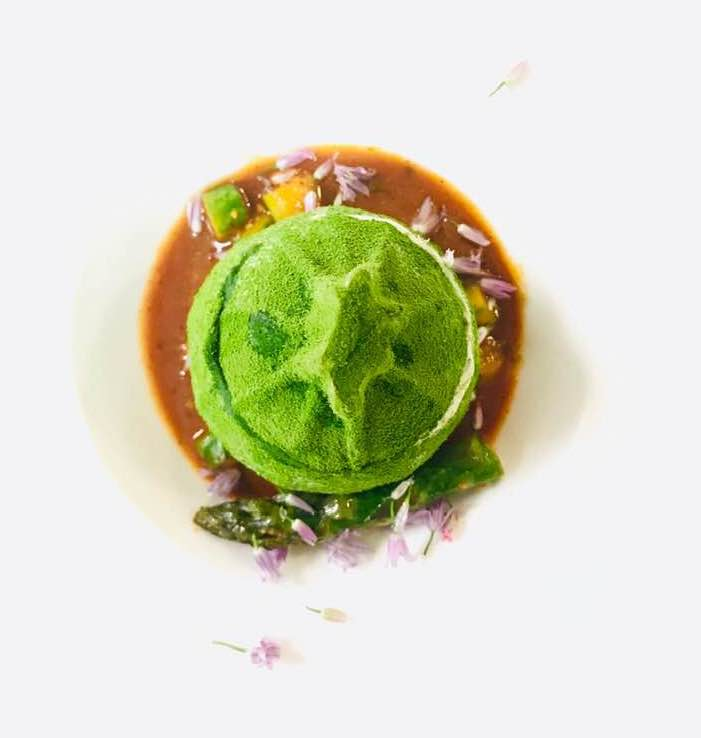
Soft tatume squash filled with vegan chorizo blend in an heirloom tomato marinara sauce

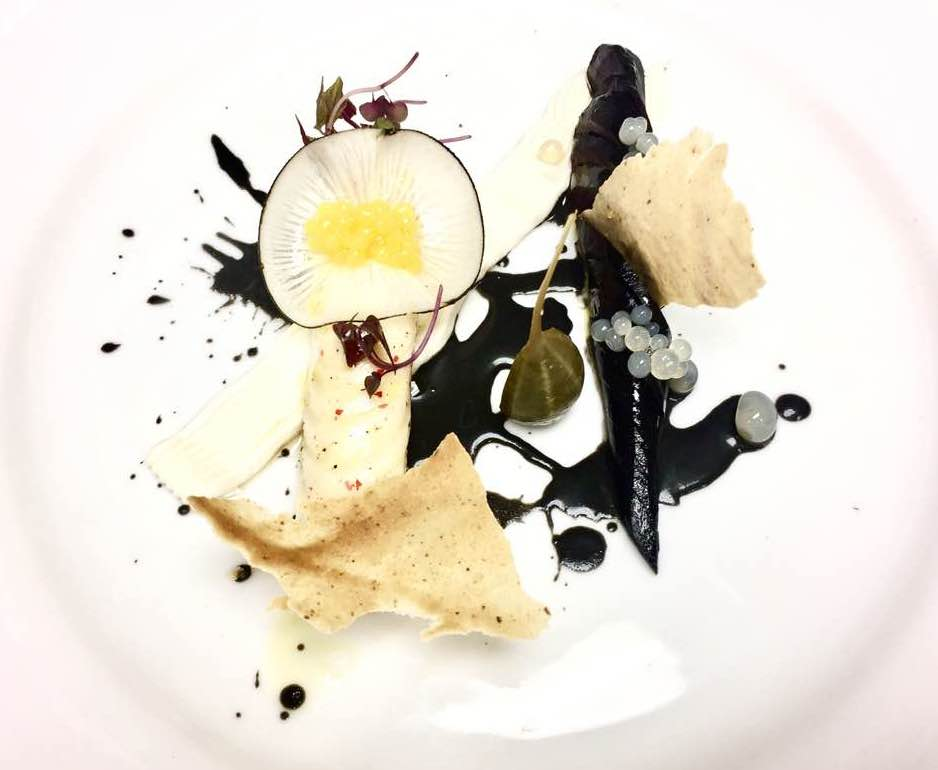
Rosemary cracker topped with fresh radish and vegan caviar pearls

== See also ==
- List of vegetarian and vegan restaurants
- Raw veganism
