= Astera (restaurant) =

Vegan restaurant in Portland, Oregon, U.S.

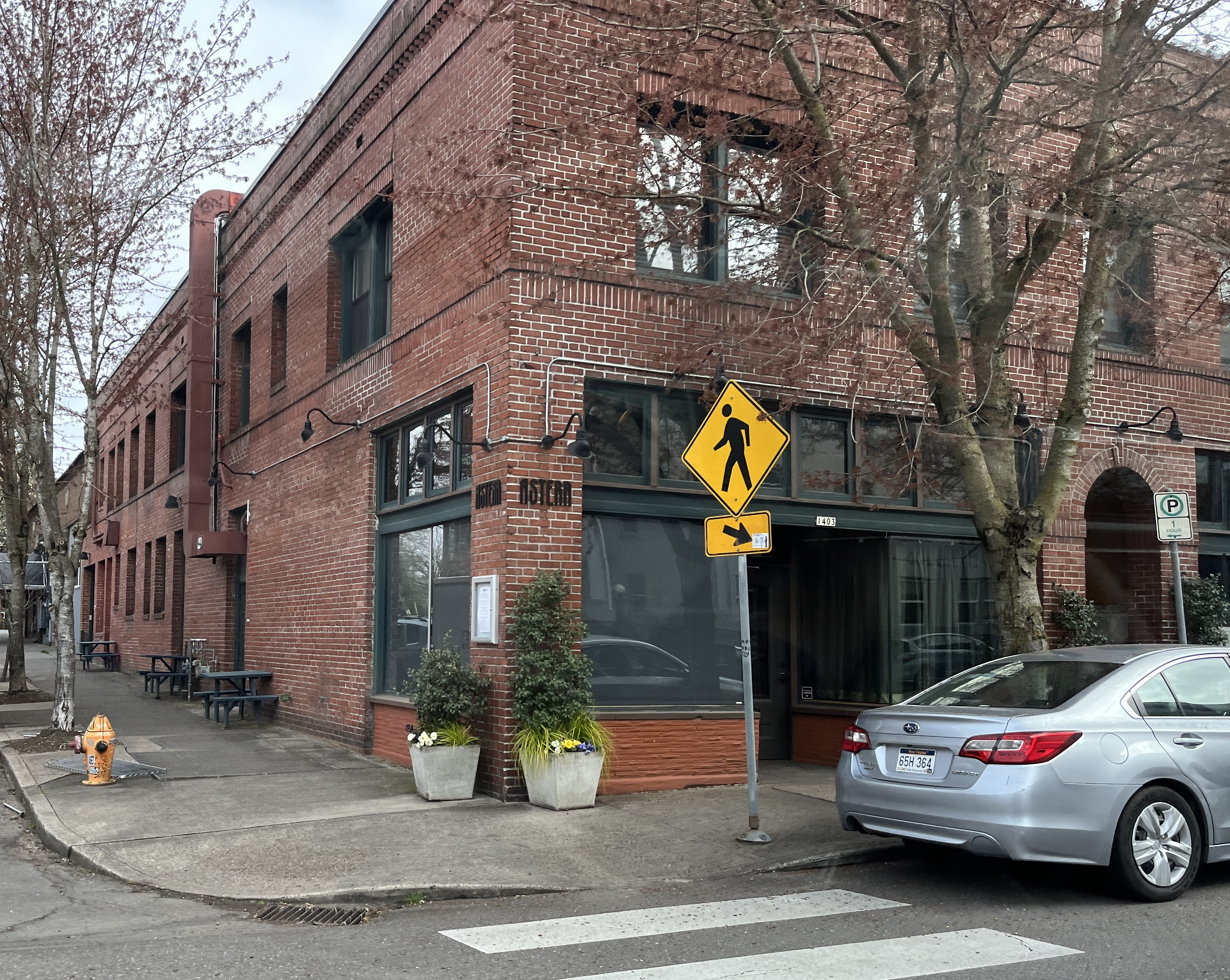
- The restaurant's exterior in 2026
- Interactive map of Astera

Restaurant information
- Chef: Aaron Adams
- Location: 1407 Southeast Belmont Street, Portland, Multnomah, Oregon, 97214, United States
- Coordinates: 45.5167°N 122.6514°W
- Seating capacity: 18
- Website: asterapdx.com

Astera is a vegan restaurant in Portland, Oregon, United States.

== Description ==
The 18-seat vegan fine-dining restaurant Astera operates on Belmont Street in southeast Portland's Buckman neighborhood. It offers a tasting menu.

== History ==
Aaron Adams is the chef. He opened the restaurant following the closure of Fermenter. The business participated in Portland Dining Month in 2026.

== Reception ==
In 2024, Karen Brooks of Portland Monthly wrote, "The best dishes could step into the ring with a Michelin contender's amuse-bouche or a Paris baker's patisserie." Astera was included in The New York Times's 2025 list of the 25 best restaurants in Portland. Anastasia Sloan included the business in Eater Portland's 2025 list of the city's 19 best vegan restaurants. In 2025, VegOut ranked Astera second in a list of best new vegan restaurants in the United States and the magazine's Anja Grommons included the business in a list of Portland's best vegan restaurants.

Hannah Wallace included Astera in Condé Nast Traveler's 2025 list of Portland's 23 best restaurants. The business also ranked fifth in The Oregonian's annual Readers Choice Awards in 2025. The newspaper's Michael Russell included Astera in a 2025 list of Portland's ten best new restaurants.

== See also ==
- List of vegetarian and vegan restaurants
