= Earth Burger =

American vegan restaurant chain

- Type: Fast food
- Industry: Restaurant
- Founder: Mike Behrend, Paul Evans and Ellen Evans
- Products: French fries, tater tots, veggie burgers and wraps
- Website: www.earthburger.com

Earth Burger is a vegan fast-food restaurant chain store with headquarters in San Antonio.

== History ==
Earth Burger was founded in San Antonio in 2014, by the co-owners of Green Vegetarian Cuisine. Executive chef Mike Behrend The Veg King, Paul Evans and Ellen Evans are members of the Seventh-day Adventist Church. Jeff Sinelli founder of Sinelli Concepts and Which Wich? helped the co-owners of Earth Burger raise $43,000 on Kickstarter to launch the fast-food restaurant, which was originally vegetarian until it became all vegan in 2017. The first location for Earth Burger was at Park North Shopping Center. Earth Burger is the first fast-food restaurant in the United States to serve a plant-based menu.

In early 2018, Earth Burger opened a location at Mall of America in Bloomington, Minnesota; it later closed in November 2019. In June 2018, Earth Burger opened its second location in San Antonio at a former Church's Texas Chicken. On August 19, 2018, Earth Burger opened in San Marcos, Texas; it later closed on January 26, 2024.

In early October 2022, Earth Burger partnered with Sinelli Concepts to franchise across the United States. In November, Earth Burger had a launch party for those interested in franchising with the company. In January 2023, Oomi Digital Kitchen became the first restaurant in Dallas to offer an Earth Burger menu digitally.

== Products ==
Products that Earth Burger offers are sandwiches and veggie burgers like their Ranchero, Classic Burger and Chik-n Sandwich. They also offer Breakfast Wrap, tater tots and french fries.

== See also ==
- List of vegetarian and vegan restaurants
- Veganism
