= Annapoorna Gowrishankar =

Restaurant chain in Tamil Nadu, India

Sree Annapoorna Sree Gowrishankar

- Type: Chain of Restaurants
- Industry: Restaurant
- Genre: South Indian Vegetarian Cuisine
- Founded: 1968 (56 years ago)
- Founder: K. Dhamodarasamy Naidu
- Headquarters: Coimbatore, India
- Area served: India
- Products: Food, Sweets, Snacks
- Number of employees: 1500
- Website: https://www.sreeannapoorna.com/

Sree Annapoorna Sree Gowrishankar is a vegetarian restaurant chain based out of Coimbatore in Tamil Nadu, India.

The Annapoorna chain was started in the early 1960s by K. Dhamodarasamy Naidu as a catering unit in Kennedy movie theater in R. S. Puram, Coimbatore. Later a coffee house was set up and run by Naidu and his three brothers K. Rangaswamy Naidu, K. Ramaswamy Naidu and K. Lakshmanan. It offered coffee, tea and tiffin items. In 1968, they opened a vegetarian restaurant under the name "Sree Annapoorna". The business grew as more restaurants were opened in many locations in Coimbatore. In 1980, a lodging hotel was opened. Currently the Annapoorna group has more than 17 restaurants in Coimbatore and in other cities of Tamil Nadu. It also operates other businesses like kitchen equipment manufacturing, construction, instant food mix production and bottling beverages. The company is currently led by chairman, K. Rammaswamy Naidu.

== See also ==
- List of vegetarian and vegan restaurants
