= Norah (restaurant) =

Asian restaurant in Portland, Oregon, U.S.

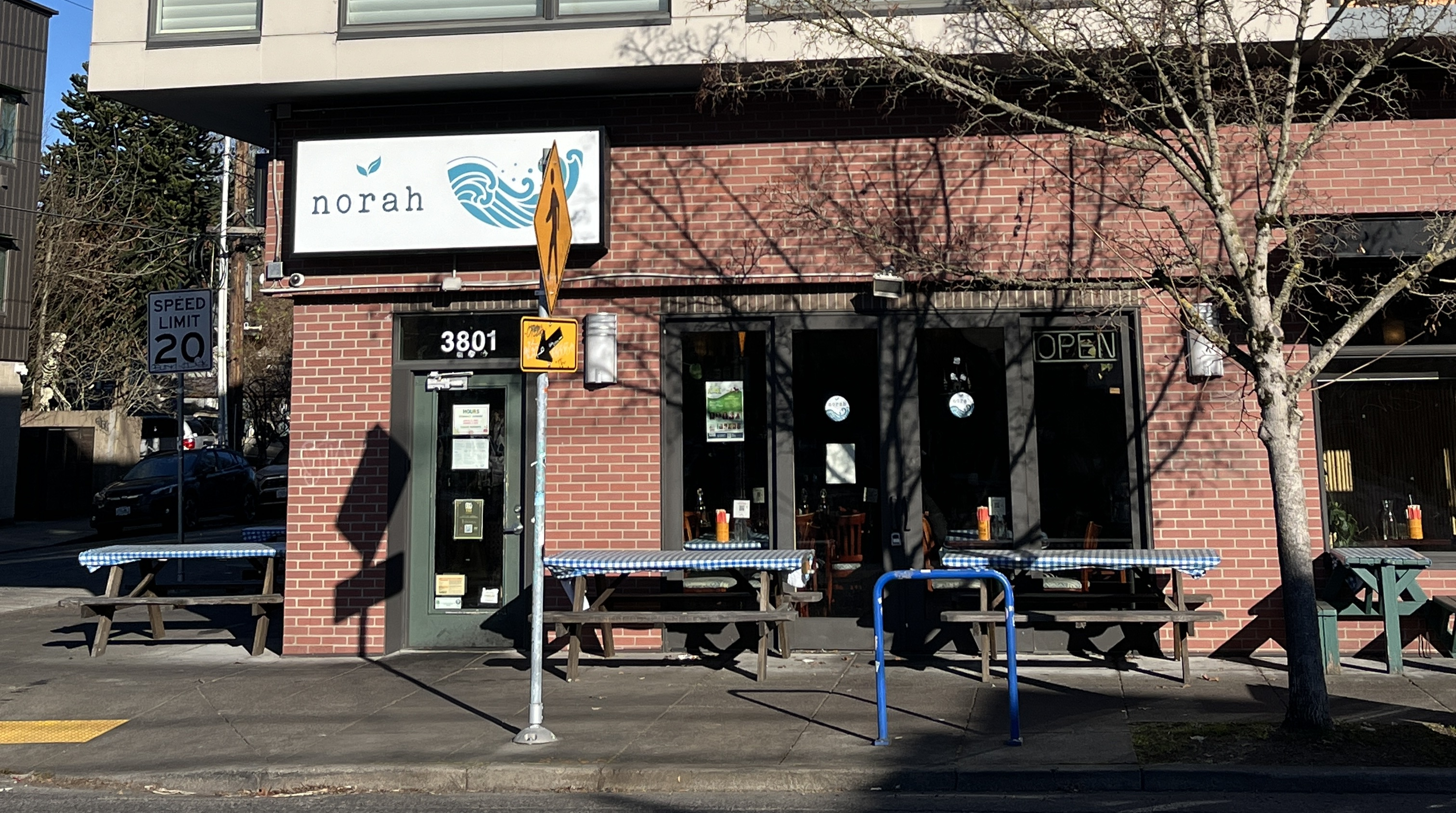
- Exterior of the original restaurant on Belmont Street in southeast Portland's Sunnyside neighborhood in 2025

Restaurant information
- Owners: Ketsuda Nan Chaison; Prae Nobnorb
- Food type: Asian; vegan
- Location: Portland, Multnomah, Oregon, United States
- Website: norahpdx.com

Norah is a restaurant with two locations in Portland, Oregon, United States. The business serves vegan Asian cuisine in southeast Portland's Sunnyside neighborhood and northeast Portland's Vernon neighborhood. It has garnered a positive reception and was included in VegOut magazine's 2024 list of the nation's ten best vegan restaurants.

== Description ==
The restaurant Norah has two locations in Portland, Oregon, operating on Belmont Street in southeast Portland's Sunnyside neighborhood and Alberta Street in northeast Portland's Vernon neighborhood. The business name references "manora", a traditional dance in southern Thailand.

Norah serves vegan Asian (or pan-Asian) cuisine. The menu includes mushroom linguine with coconut-galangal sauce as well as pad thai and roasted cauliflower with curry. The restaurant has also served noodle soups, samosas, and pad thai nachos.

== History ==
Ketsuda Nan Chaison and Prae Nobnorb are co-owners.

The Alberta Street location opened on November 5, 2024.

== Reception ==
In 2024, Norah was included in VegOut magazine's list of the ten best vegan restaurants in the U.S., and Kay Kingsman included the business in a Fodor's list of Portland's fifteen best restaurants. Norah was a runner-up in the Best Vegetarian / Vegan Restaurant category of Willamette Week's annual 'Best of Portland' readers' poll in 2024. It was a finalist in the same category in 2025. The business was included in a Yelp list of Portland's ten best vegan eateries in 2025.

== See also ==
- List of vegetarian and vegan restaurants
