= Blossoming Lotus =

Restaurant in Portland, Oregon

Coordinates: 45°32′9.63″N 122°39′2.14″W

- Interactive map of Blossoming Lotus

Restaurant information
- Established: 2002
- Location: Portland, Oregon, United States
- Other information: Hawaii

Blossoming Lotus is a counter-service vegan restaurant in Portland, Oregon, United States. It was founded in Kapa'a, Hawaii in 2002. At its peak the company had three restaurants, but now only operates a single location in Portland.

== History ==
Blossoming Lotus opened in 2002, with Mark Reinfeld as chef, with financial backing from Bo Rinaldi. In 2006 Blossoming Lotus moved to a larger location at the Dragon Building in downtown Kapaʻa. The original location was transformed into "The Lotus Root: a juice bar and bakery".

The original Blossoming Lotus Cafe in Portland, Oregon opened on July 29, 2009, in the Northeast Irvington neighborhood, and was followed by the closure of their Pearl District location. A fourth location was planned for Mountain View, California, but never came to fruition.

Both Kauai locations closed in 2008 because of debt and a sharp downturn in tourism, a catastrophic flood that hit the island, and the closure of two budget airlines servicing the island.

The Blossoming Lotus style of international vegan cuisine was popularized in the 2004 Vegan World Fusion Cuisine Cookbook, written by founder and executive chef Mark Reinfeld and owner Bo Rinaldi. The book contains an introduction by Jane Goodall and 200 vegan recipes.

In April 2024, Blossoming Lotus announced that their main location in Irvington would close on April 4, 2024. The restaurant was closed a day early on April 3 after running out of food due to an influx of customers.

== Reception ==
- Food Network named them one of the top 20 vegan restaurants in the United States.
- Restaurant of the Month (August 2004) - People for the Ethical Treatment of Animals
- 'Ilima Award for Best Kaua'i Restaurant, Critics' Choice (2006) - The Honolulu Advertiser
- Top Chef in Live Food, Platinum Carrot Chef Award (2006) - Aspen Center for Integral Health

== See also ==
- List of vegetarian and vegan restaurants
