= Murugan Idli Shop =

Indian restaurant chain

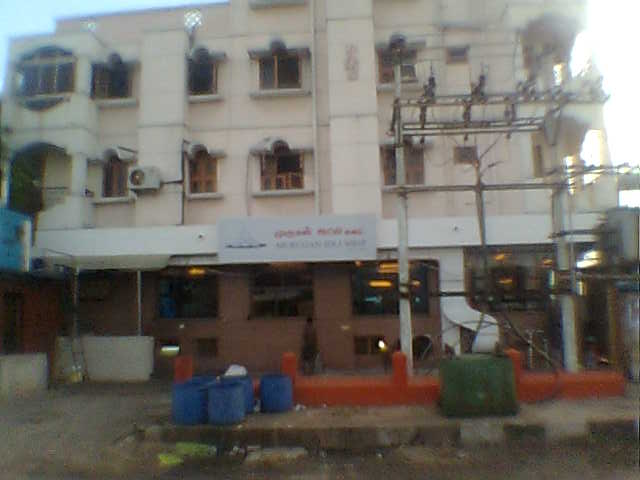
- Type: Coffee, snacks, and idlis
- Industry: Food
- Headquarters: Chennai, India
- Area served: India, Singapore

Murugan Idli Shop (Tamil: முருகன் இட்லி கடை) is a chain of restaurants, founded in the city of Madurai in Tamil Nadu, India. It specializes in Idli. The chain has seventeen restaurants in Chennai, three restaurants in Madurai, one in kolar and two in Singapore.

== History ==
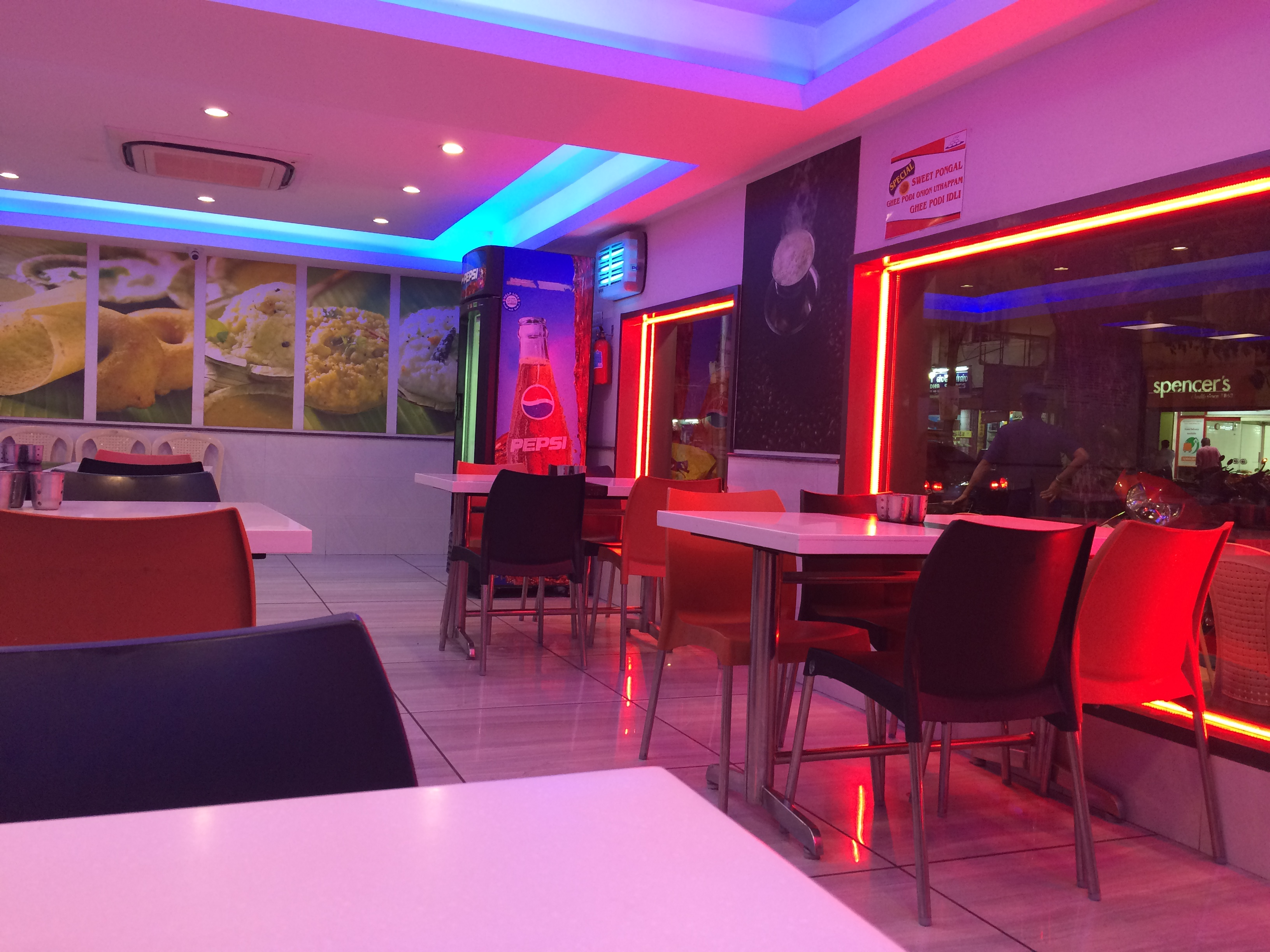
Murugan Idli Shop at Nanganallur, Chennai

Originally named "Murugan Coffee Nilayam," the original Madurai branch only served coffee, snacks, and idlis. In 1991, the new owner of the restaurant changed its name and significantly expanded the menu. The first Chennai branch was subsequently established in 2003.

In 2019, the licence of its central kitchen based at Ambattur Industrial Estate was suspended due to unhygienic and adverse sanitary conditions. Additionally, on a complaint filed by a customer, notice was issued by officials from the Chennai division of the Department of Food Safety and Drugs Administration to a Murugan Idli Shop outlet located at Parry’s Corner.

== See also ==
- List of vegetarian and vegan restaurants
