= Café Gratitude =

Restaurant chain

Cafe Gratitude is a small West Coast chain of restaurants serving organic, plant-based (vegan), and often locally-grown food, founded by Terces and Matthew Engelhart. As of 2024, there are two operating Café Gratitude locations, both in Los Angeles: one in Venice and the other in Larchmont Village. A separately-owned location exists in Kansas City, Missouri. Menu items feature such names as "I am Beautiful" and "I am Dazzling", with options ranging from appetizers, soups and salads, to entrées, brunch specials, sandwiches, veggie bowls and desserts. Many items are prepared with meat-free alternatives, such as crispy, smoked coconut or potato strips (as "bacon"), mushroom "carnitas", or crumbled tempeh "ground beef". In addition to their largely plant-based cuisine, some select dishes and menu items include honey.

Café Gratitude maintained a presence in the San Francisco Bay Area for over a decade, but closed its last location there in 2015. Later that year, the company opened a new location, at the opposite end of the state, in San Diego's historic Little Italy neighborhood; it closed seven years later.

== Owners ==
Except for the Kansas City location, Cafe Gratitude is majority owned and managed by Love Serve Remember, LLC. The Kansas City location is owned and operated by Michael George.

== Philosophy ==
Cafe Gratitude is said to be managed according to the principles of Sacred Commerce, as outlined in a book of the same name by Matthew and Terces Engelhart. This claims to integrate the intention and philosophy of dharma – right actions, right intentions, right speech – as a way of being connected to spirit.

== Controversies ==
=== Landmark Education ===
In 2009, the East Bay Express reported on Cafe Gratitude's policy of strongly encouraging employees to attend Landmark Education's introductory "Landmark Forum". Employees described being denied promotion due to discomfort or disinterest in the intensive seminar, and one former manager was forced to step down and later fired after speaking critically of Café Gratitude's embrace of the Landmark program. Café Gratitude paid half the $500 cost of the course for employees who chose to attend.

=== Meat consumption by founders ===
In 2016, Terces and Matthew Engelhart received a heated backlash after the vegan community learned that they chose to raise, slaughter, and consume cattle on their private farm, which supplied much of Café Gratitude's produce. The Engelharts themselves declined an interview request, but Cary Mosier, Terces Engelhart's son and Cafe Gratitude's chief operating officer, said the feud against Cafe Gratitude has unfairly cast his mother and stepfather as deceptive animal killers.

=== Bad labor practices ===
In November 2021, long-time workers at the Santa Cruz location (now re-branded as cafegSC) accused the newly hired general manager of hoarding the best shifts for himself and his friends. When the workers brought this up to the owner and asked that the manager in question be demoted, the workers were fired instead. The former employees tried to negotiate, and ended up calling for a boycott after fruitless requests to negotiate with the owner. This location eventually closed in October 2023.

== History ==
Cafe Gratitude started as a small chain of organic plant based restaurants in the San Francisco Bay Area, one in Berkeley and another in Santa Cruz. Michael George opened a Kansas City location in 2012.

Previous locations also included Newport Beach, Beverly Hills, San Francisco, San Rafael, Healdsburg, and inside the Oakland and Cupertino Whole Foods. The Northern California locations closed following a lawsuit filed by employees alleging improper tip pooling, wage theft, and labor misclassification. A Facebook posting from the Engelharts claimed that their position was "completely legal" but that defending them in court would be too expensive, calling the process "legalized extortion". The company was able to settle out of court in early 2012, under an arrangement that allowed two Northern California restaurants to remain operational. In 2011, Matthew and Terces Englehart closed Cafe Gratitude, at Harrison and 20th streets, San Francisco. The remaining Berkeley location closed in 2015.

In late 2009, Matthew and Terces Englehart opened Gracias Madre, at 2211 Mission Street, San Francisco, which closed on 28 August 2023.

As of 2023, three locations remain in Southern California.

== See also ==
- List of vegetarian and vegan restaurants
