= Bakers Bench =

Bakery in Los Angeles, California, U.S.

Coordinates: 34.0654°N 118.2469°W

- Interactive map of Bakers Bench

Restaurant information
- Owner: Jennifer Yee
- Location: Los Angeles, California, United States
- Website: bakersbenchla.com

Bakers Bench is a vegan bakery in Los Angeles, California, United States.

== Description ==
Bakers Bench serves plant-based baked goods.

== History ==
Jennifer Yee is the owner.

== Reception ==
In 2024, Bakers Bench was included in The New York Times's list of the 22 best bakeries in the United States.

== See also ==
- List of bakeries
- List of vegetarian and vegan restaurants
