= Native Foods Cafe =

U.S. vegan restaurant chain

Native Foods
- Type: Private
- Founded: 1994
- Headquarters: Chicago, Illinois, U.S.
- Services: Restaurant Fast-Casual Plant-Based
- Website: www.nativefoods.com

Native Foods is a fast-casual vegan restaurant chain that operates in California, Colorado and Illinois. The first Native Foods opened as "Native Foods Cafe" in 1994 in Palm Springs, California, by Tanya Petrovna. In 2009, the brand was acquired by Daniel Dolan and Andrea McGinty, who relocated the company to Chicago.

== See also ==
- List of vegetarian and vegan restaurants
- Veganism
