= Cinnaholic =

American cinnamon roll bakery franchise

- Type: Privately held company
- Industry: Restaurants
- Founded: 2010; Berkeley, California, U.S.
- Founders: Shannon Radke; Florian Radke
- Headquarters: Atlanta, Georgia, U.S.
- Number of locations: 100+
- Key people: Daryl Dollinger, CEO; Spencer Reid, President; Shannon and Florian Radke, Co-founders
- Products: Cinnamon rolls Coffee; Chocolate brownies Catering
- Parent: Cinnaholic Franchising, LLC. (2015–present)
- Website: www.cinnaholic.com

Cinnaholic is an American cinnamon roll bakery franchise founded in 2010 in Berkeley, California. The company is known for its made-to-order, gourmet vegan cinnamon rolls and other sweet treats. As of August 2022, Cinnaholic operates 73 bakeries across the United States and Canada.

All of Cinnaholic's products are 100 percent vegan, dairy and lactose-free, egg-free and cholesterol-free. In addition to cinnamon rolls, Cinnaholic serves scratch-made brownies, raw chocolate chip cookie dough, baked chocolate chip cookies, cinnamon roll cakes and bite-sized cinnamon rolls called 'Baby Buns'.

The company's co-founders, Shannon and Florian Radke, appeared on the television show Shark Tank in 2014, which ended with the pair initially accepting an offer from Robert Herjavec and then later declining the offer.

Cinnaholic is headquartered in Atlanta, Georgia.

== History ==
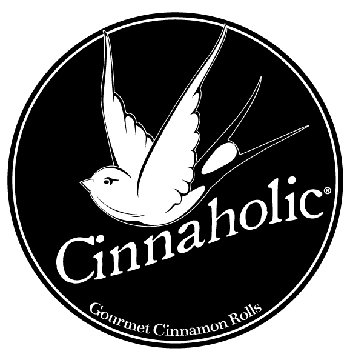
Cinnaholic logo

Shannon and Florian Radke opened the first Cinnaholic bakery on Oxford Street in Berkeley, California, in July 2010. The husband and wife team appeared on the television show Shark Tank in 2014, which ended in an investment offer. The company adopted a franchise business model in 2015.

Cinnaholic Franchising, LLC moved its headquarters from Berkeley, California, to Atlanta, Georgia. Cinnaholic's first franchise-operated bakeshop opened in Southlake, Texas, near Dallas in October 2015. The company opened its first international bakery in Edmonton, Alberta, Canada, in May 2018.

Cinnaholic was named to Entrepreneur magazine's "Top New Franchisees of 2018" list. Co-founder, Shannon Radke, appeared on the cover of the September 2018 issue of Franchise Times Magazine. The couple were also featured in Diablo Magazine's "40 under 40" issue in January 2014.

== See also ==
- List of franchises
- List of bakeries
- List of vegetarian and vegan restaurants
- Veganism
