= Doe Donuts =

Doughnut shop in Portland, Oregon, U.S.

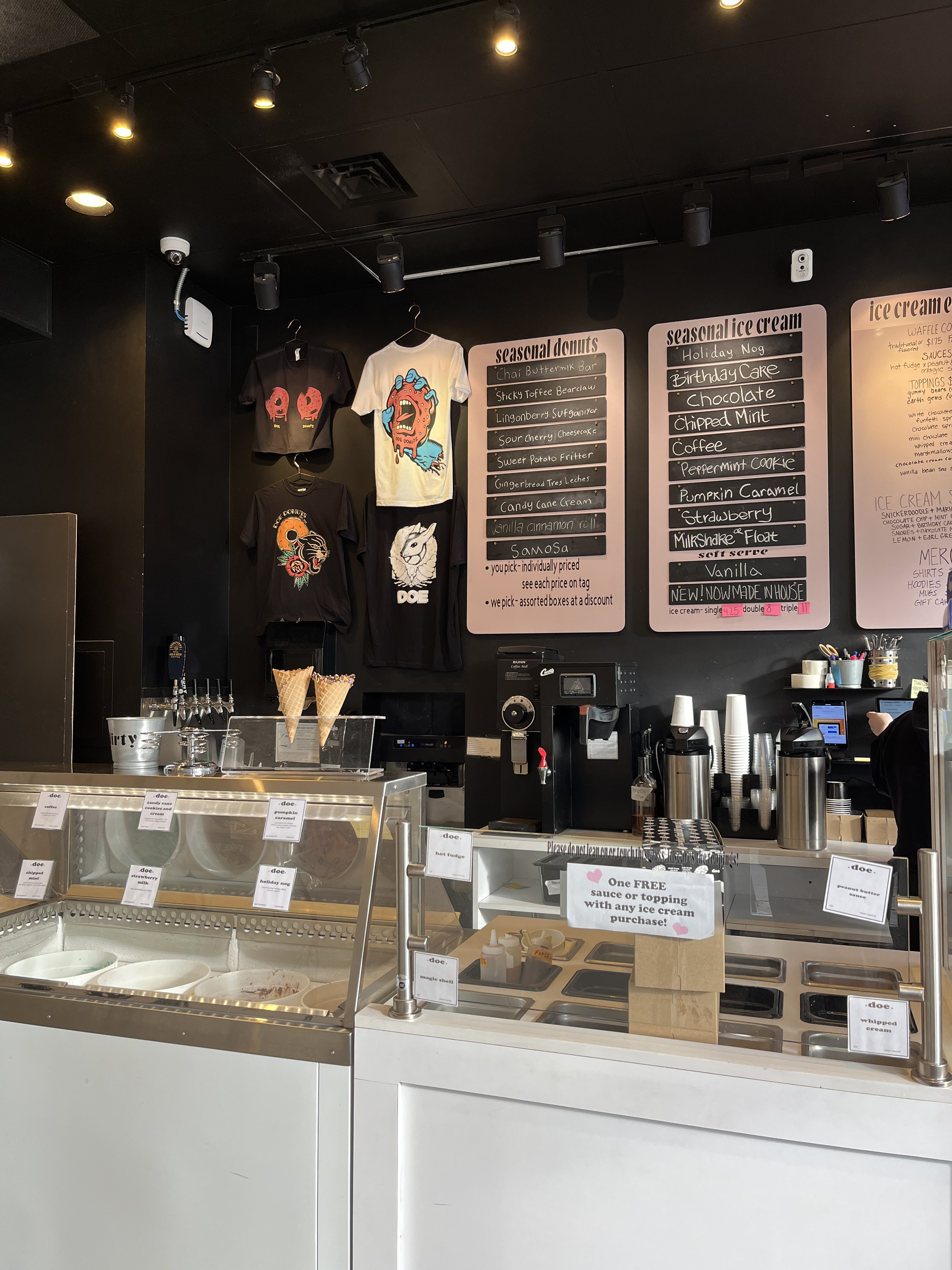
- The shop's interior, 2024
- Interactive map of Doe Donuts

Restaurant information
- Location: Portland, Multnomah, Oregon, United States
- Coordinates: 45.5352°N 122.6211°W
- Website: doedonuts.com

Doe Donuts is a vegan doughnut shop in Portland, Oregon, United States.

== Description ==
The vegan doughnut shop Doe Donuts operates in the Hollywood neighborhood of northeast Portland. Among seasonal varieties is the spaghetti and garlic bread doughnut.

== History ==
Carly Sitner and Crystal Wegener opened Doe in northeast Portland's Hollywood District in 2017. Upon opening, Doe was the only all-vegan doughnut shop in the city.

Philip Rosenthal visited Doe for a 2022 episode of the Netflix series Somebody Feed Phil.

Workers voted to join Doughnut Workers United in 2023. The shop was burglarized in January 2025.

== Reception ==
Alex Frane included the business in Thrillist's 2021 overview of the "absolute best" doughnut shops in Portland. Bon Appétit included Doe in a 2023 list of the city's best doughnut shops.

In Eater Portland's 2024 overview of the city's "most delicious" doughnuts, Nick Townsend said Doe is "one of the few Portland shops to sell seasonal savory doughnuts — think green chile mac and cheese or spaghetti and garlic bread". Anastasia Sloan included the business in the website's 2025 overview of the city's best dairy-free frozen desserts.

Doe ranked second in the Best Donut category of Willamette Week's annual 'Best of Portland' readers' poll in 2024. The business was included in a Yelp list of Portland's ten best vegan eateries in 2025.

== See also ==
- List of doughnut shops
- List of vegetarian and vegan restaurants
