= Annalakshmi =

Food chain in Malaysia

- Type: Southern and Northern Indian Vegetarian specialities
- Industry: Food
- Founded: 1985
- Headquarters: Malaysia,
- Area served: Malaysia, Australia, Singapore, India

Annalakshmi is an international chain of vegetarian restaurants started in 1985 by Swami Shantanand Saraswathi and operating on the uncommon principle of trust in humanity, as it encourages patrons to pay what they believe is fair. The name derives from the Hindu goddess of abundance, as a compound word obtained from Annam (Tamil/Telugu language) (food) and Lakshmi (the eponymous deity). It is the culinary division of the non-profit organization Temple of Fine Arts (TFA).

== History ==
First started in Bangsar, Kuala Lumpur) Malaysia by Swami Shantanand Saraswathi, a Hindu religious teacher who relocated in the 1970s from Rishikesh in India with a vision of the world without hunger in 1985. Annalakshmi has branches in Australia, Singapore and India. The system in these restaurants allows patrons to “eat as they wish and pay as they feel”. The Coimbatore branch (started 1989), is known to participate in local charities and support the fine arts. In 2013, the Chennai branch won the Times Food and Nightlife Award, in the category Best South Indian Restaurant (Stand-alone).

== See also ==
- Vegetarian Society (Singapore)
- List of vegetarian and vegan restaurants
