= Fermenter (restaurant) =

Defunct vegan restaurant in Portland, Oregon, U.S.

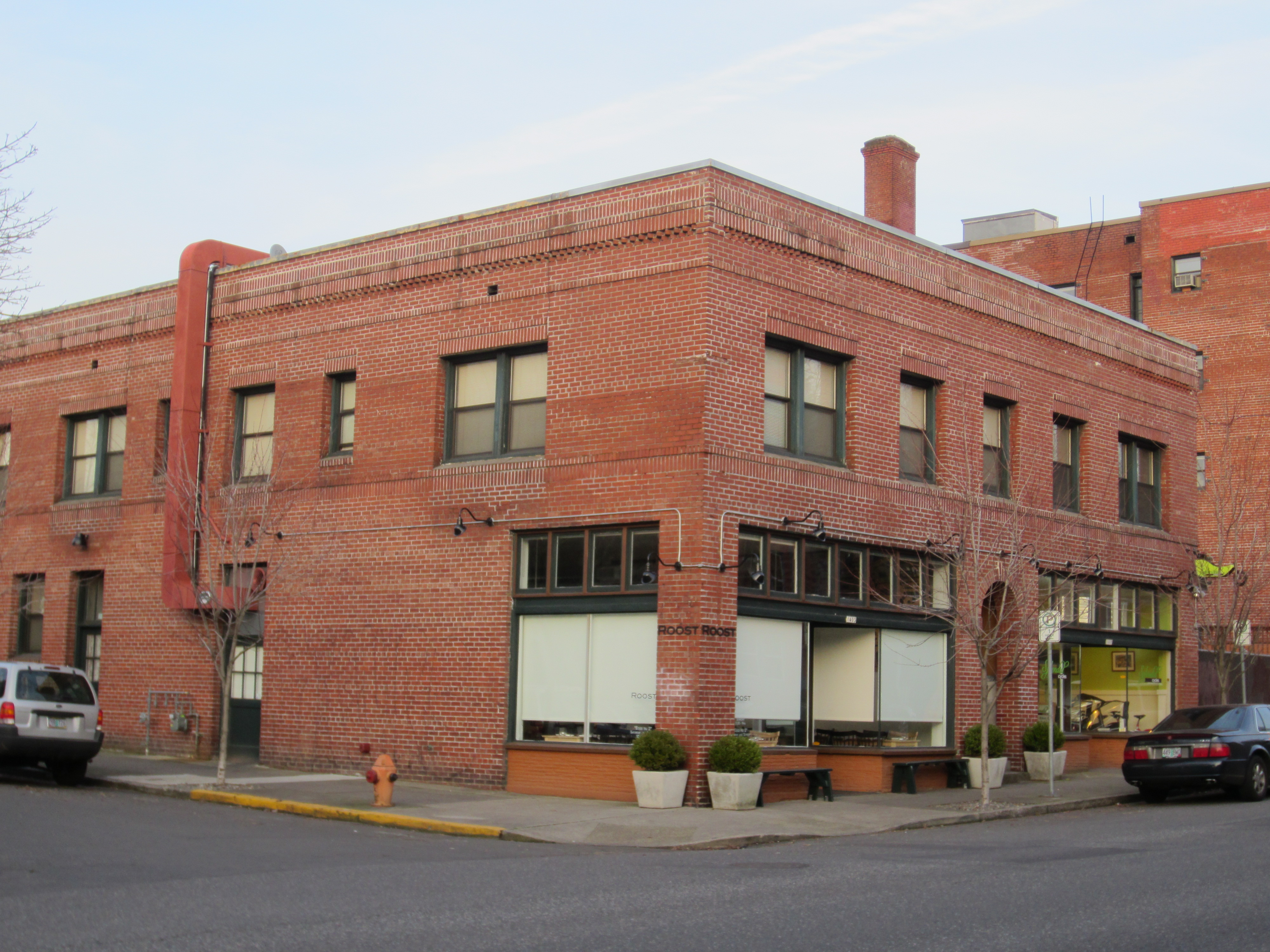
- 2012 photograph of the building that later housed Fermenter
- Interactive map of Fermenter

Restaurant information
- Established: 2019
- Closed: 2024
- Owner: Aaron Adams
- Chef: Aaron Adams
- Location: 1403 Southeast Belmont Street, Portland, Multnomah, Oregon, 97214, United States
- Coordinates: 45°31′00″N 122°39′05″W
- Website: fermenterpdx.com

Fermenter was a vegan restaurant and delicatessen in Portland, Oregon, United States. Chef and owner Aaron Adams operated the restaurant in southeast Portland's Buckman neighborhood from 2019 to 2024.

== Description ==
The 600-square-foot vegan restaurant and delicatessen Fermenter was located in southeast Portland's Buckman neighborhood. The business operated in a red brick building at the intersection of Belmont and 14th Avenue.

The menu included burgers. The brunch menu included sourdough waffles with salal berry jam and roasted peaches, hazelnut buttermilk koji biscuits with smoked maitake gravy, and grits with peppers, hazelnut cheese, and tempeh sausage. In 2020, during the COVID-19 pandemic, the restaurant offered holiday meal kits with cauliflower soup and koji maitakes with winter vegetables.

== History ==
Chef Aaron Adams opened the restaurant in 2019, sharing a kitchen and hallway with Farm Spirit.

In February 2024, Adams confirmed plans to close Fermenter permanently at the end of March. The pasta restaurant Il Paffuto moved into the space.

== Reception ==
Michael Russell included Fermenter in The Oregonian's list of Portland's ten best new restaurants of 2019. He later included Fermenter in the newspaper's list of the 21 "most painful" restaurant and bar closures of 2024. Waz Wu included the business in Eater Portland's 2021 overview of the "hottest spots for vegan brunch right now".

== See also ==
- List of vegetarian and vegan restaurants
