= Feral (restaurant) =

Vegan restaurant in Portland, Oregon, U.S.

- Interactive map of Feral

Restaurant information
- Chef: Ryan Koger; August Winningham
- Location: 1640 NE Killingsworth Street, Portland, Multnomah, Oregon, United States
- Coordinates: 45°33′45″N 122°38′54″W
- Website: feralvegan.com

Feral is a restaurant in Portland, Oregon, United States. Chefs Ryan Koger and August Winningham started the business as a pop-up restaurant in 2022. Feral moved into a brick and mortar space on Killingsworth Street in northeast Portland's Vernon neighborhood.

== Description ==
The restaurant Feral operates on Killingsworth Street in northeast Portland, Oregon's Vernon neighborhood. According to Lonely Planet, the restaurant's "regularly evolving menu of plant-based dishes [showcases] locally grown and foraged ingredients".

The menu has included a fried tofu sandwich, carbonara toast with kidney beans, masa dumplings in sweet corn sauce, fried kimchi, and squash ragu. The restaurant has also served baked leek fondue with Vtopian cheese and fried Triscuits, cheesecake miso-apple cider butterscotch, delicata squash donuts, PBJ cabbage with chile crisp and dekopane marmalade. The drink menu includes a banana daiquiri and the Morning Brew, which is an espresso martini with coffee rum and passionfruit cachaca.

== History ==
Chefs Ryan Koger and August Winningham launched Feral as a pop-up restaurant at Bye and Bye in October 2022. In early 2023, Feral hosted seaweed-focused dinner as part of Winter Waters, a culinary series from Blue Evolution and Oregon Seaweed. The menu included collards with alliums, wild rice and sea lettuce glazed in dashi, cabbage with a citrus beurre blanc, fermented red currant pearls, seaweed, and herbs, as well as cocktails such as the Kombu sour with Aimsir Gin, Accompani Mari Gold, kombu and rice vinegar shrub, aquafaba, and lemon.

== Reception ==
In 2024, Feral won in the Best New Vegan Restaurant category of VegNews magazine's second annual Restaurant Awards. Brenna Houck included Feral in Eater Portland's 2025 list of the city's eighteen best vegan and vegetarian restaurants.

== See also ==
- List of vegetarian and vegan restaurants
