= Life on Mars (restaurant) =

Restaurant and record shop in Seattle, Washington, U.S.

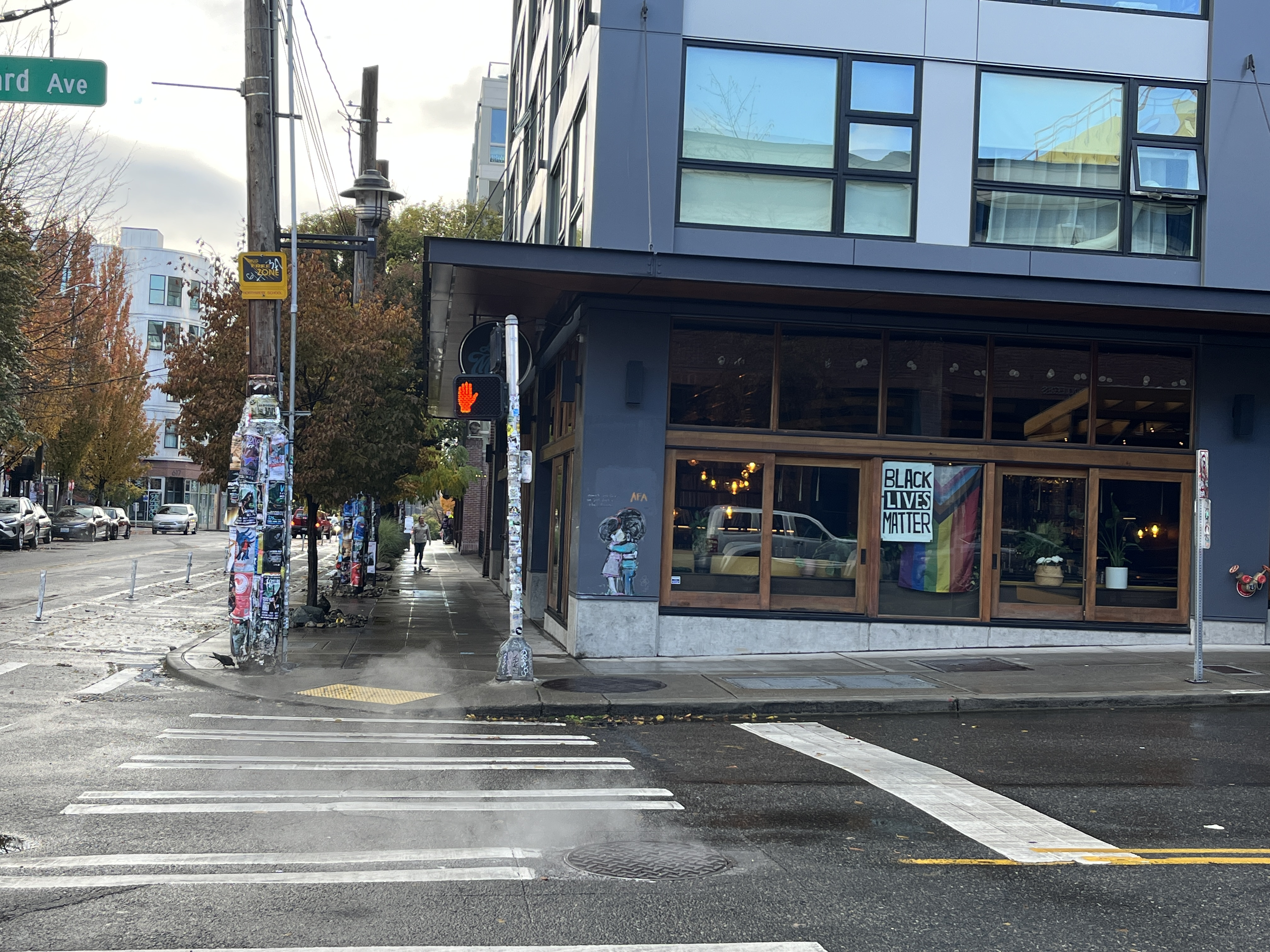
- The restaurant's exterior in 2022
- Interactive map of Life on Mars

Restaurant information
- Food type: Vegan
- Location: 722 E Pike Street, Seattle, King, Washington, 98122, United States
- Coordinates: 47.6143°N 122.3224°W
- Website: lifeonmarsseattle.com

Life on Mars is a vegan restaurant, bar, and record shop in Seattle, in the U.S. state of Washington.

== Description ==
Life on Mars is a restaurant, bar, and record shop operating in Capitol Hill's Pike Flats building. Gabe Guarente of Eater Seattle has described the business as a "vinyl record-themed bar". The business has served jackfruit tacos and cauliflower wings. The drink menu has included The Chillwave (gin, amaro nonino, and citrus), The Opener (green tea vodka, elderflower, lemon, and soda), the Velvet Goldmine (mezcal, dark rum, cashew orgeat, and ginger), and the Life on Mars Imperial IPA made by Reuben's Brews. The Friendship Bracelet has Ming River Baiju, Kiyomi Rum, Singani 63, Crème de Banane, Skinos Mastiha, fruit juice, strawberry basil and cucumber shrub.

== History ==
Life on Mars opened in June 2019. The restaurant was vandalized in April 2020. Murals were painted outside Life on Mars during the COVID-19 pandemic.

Steven Severin is a co-owner as of 2021. In 2021, Life on Mars participated in the Pike Street Trick or Treat, offering drink discounts for patrons dressed in Halloween costumes.

In January 2022, the business closed temporarily because of a staff shortage. Life on Mars re-opened on January 15, debuting a selection of nine non-alcoholic cocktails for Dry January.

== Reception ==
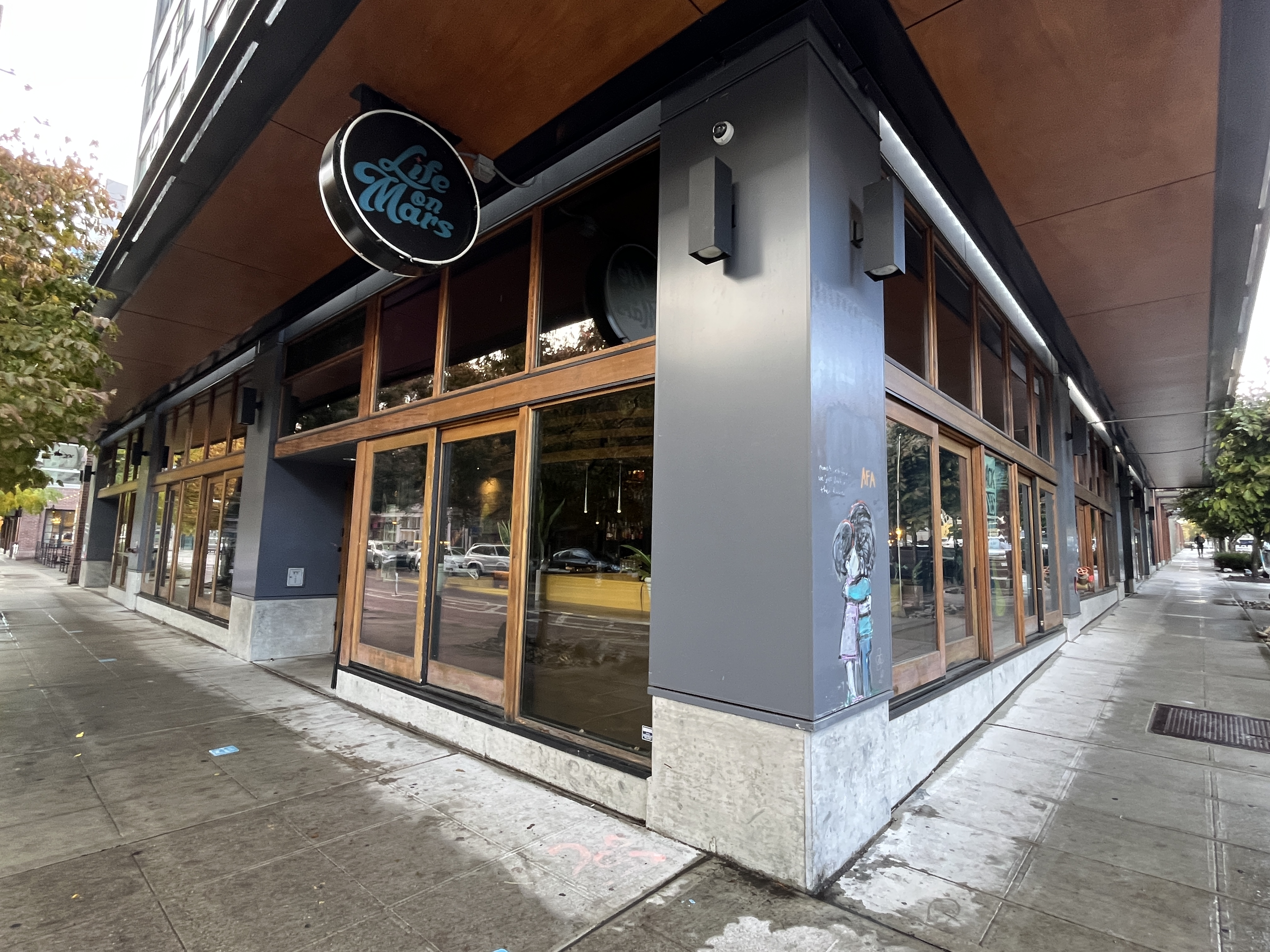
Exterior, 2022

Ellen Meny of KING-TV said in 2019, "This is the ultimate spot for vinyl lovers, vegans, and everyone in between. If you love good music, good drinks and good plant-based food, Life on Mars is the place to be."

In 2021, Gabe Guarente included Life on Mars in Eater Seattle's overview of "where to order some of Seattle's best cocktails". The website's Mark Van Streefkerk included the restaurant in a 2022 list of eleven "great Seattle spots for elaborate nonalcoholic drinks". Guarante and Brianna Gunter included Life on Mars in a 2023 list of thirteen Seattle bars with "incredible" cocktails.

Allecia Vermillion included Life on Mars in Seattle Metropolitan's 2022 list of the city's best vegan and plant-based eateries. Naomi Tomky and Bradley Foster included the business in Thrillist's 2022 overview of "The Absolute Best Bars in Seattle Right Now".

== See also ==
- List of vegetarian and vegan restaurants
