= Vertical Diner =

American restaurant chain

Vertical Diner is a chain of vegan restaurants in the United States. The business was established in Salt Lake City and serves American cuisine.

== Description ==
The menu includes breakfast options include banana or blueberry pancakes, as well as burgers and tenders. The restaurant has also served Asian-style lettuce wraps, crostini with escargot and carrot butter, seitan nuggets, and vegan versions of macaroni and cheese, mashed potatoes and gravy, milkshakes, and nachos. The Avalanche has two pancakes, country potatoes, and tofu scramble. The Sunrise Burrito is served with tempeh bacon or sausage.

== History ==
In addition to Salt Lake City, Vertical Diner operated in Portland, Oregon, from 2019 to 2026.

== See also ==
- List of defunct restaurants in Portland, Oregon
- List of restaurant chains in the United States
- List of vegetarian and vegan restaurants
