= Plant (restaurant) =

Vegan restaurant in Asheville, North Carolina, US

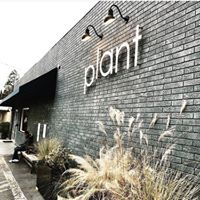
- Plant exterior
- Interactive map of Plant

Restaurant information
- Established: 2011
- Owners: Jason Sellers, Leslie Armstrong, Alan Berger
- Head chef: Jason Sellers
- Pastry chef: Leah Edwards
- Location: 165 Merrimon Avenue, Asheville, North Carolina, 28801, United States
- Coordinates: 35°36′17″N 82°33′10.2″W
- Seating capacity: 47
- Website: plantisfood.com

Plant is a vegan fine-dining restaurant in Asheville, North Carolina.

== History ==
Plant was opened in 2011 by chef Jason Sellers and investors Leslie Armstrong and Alan Berger. It was Asheville's first all-vegan restaurant.

== Reception ==
Food & Wine named them to a list of the best 19 vegetarian and vegan restaurants in the U.S. Food Network named them one of the top 20 vegan restaurants in the United States.

In 2013 Travel + Leisure named them one of the best vegetarian restaurants in the U.S. In 2015 Plant was named one of the top six vegan fine-dining restaurants in the United States by PETA and BuzzFeed named them one of 24 "bucket list" vegan restaurants. In 2017 Tasting Table and The Daily Meal named them one of the best vegan restaurants in the United States. In 2018 USA Today named them one of the ten best vegan restaurants in the country, and Insider named them the best vegan restaurant in North Carolina. In 2019 Thrillist named Plant one of the 22 best vegetarian restaurants in the United States. In 2023 VegOut Magazine said, "prepare to be amazed".

== See also ==
- List of vegetarian and vegan restaurants
