= VeganBurg =

Plant-based burger restaurant chain

Coordinates: 1°19′15″N 103°54′19″E

- Type: Private
- Industry: Fast casual restaurants
- Founded: October 10, 2010; 16 years ago
- Founder: Alex Tan
- Headquarters: San Francisco, United States and Singapore
- Number of locations: 2
- Area served: United States & Singapore
- Key people: Alex Tan (CEO)
- Website: www.veganburg.com

VeganBurg is a vegan fast casual burger joint restaurant chain established on October 10, 2010.

== Overview ==
VeganBurg is a chain of restaurants with two outlets in Singapore and one outlet in California, United States. Its menu includes vegan burgers, sides and desserts.

Veganburg received the 74th title from 2019 Fast Casual Top Movers and Shakers award presented by the James Beard Foundation Award.

Miss Singapore World 2013 Maria-Anna Weiling Zenieris collaborated with VeganBurg on the Meat Free Monday campaign.

== See also ==
- Vegetarian and Vegan Restaurants in Singapore
- List of vegetarian and vegan restaurants
- Lists of restaurants
- List of hamburger restaurants
