= World Pizza =

Pizzeria in Seattle, Washington, U.S.

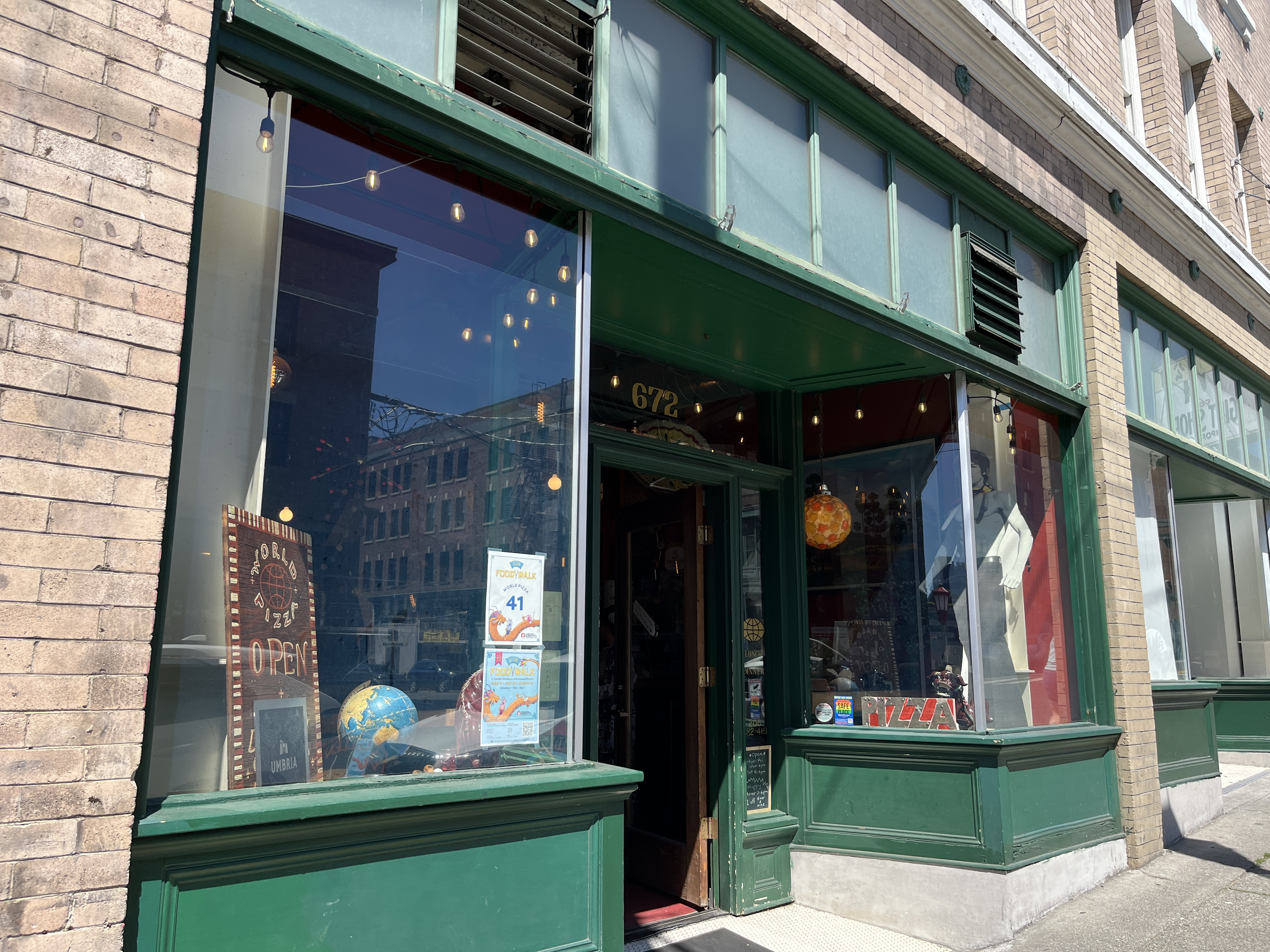
- The pizzeria's exterior, 2024
- Interactive map of World Pizza

Restaurant information
- Location: 672 South King Street, Seattle, King, Washington, 98104, United States
- Coordinates: 47.5985°N 122.3240°W
- Website: worldpizzaseattle.com

World Pizza is a vegetarian pizzeria in Seattle's Chinatown–International District, in the U.S. state of Washington. Brothers Aaron Crosleycone and Adam Cone opened the original shop in Belltown in the 1990s; the business re-opened in its current location in 2011. World Pizza has garnered a generally positive reception.

== Description ==
World Pizza is a pizzeria in Seattle's Chinatown–International District (C–ID); the business originally operated in Belltown. Seattle Metropolitan has described World Pizza as a "comfortably worn" vegetarian pizza bar, serving whole pics and slices with "utilitarian" crusts with "clever" topping combinations. According to Seattle Magazine, the shop has a "groovy, cheerful" interior with an orange couch and "retro" fixtures.

One pizza has vegetarian pepperoni. Another variety has gorgonzola, potato, and rosemary. Other pizza ingredients include basil, pesto, roasted red potato, vegetarian sausage, and walnut. World Pizza also offers vegan pizzas. The shop also serves large chocolate chip cookies.

== History ==
Brothers Aaron Crosleycone and Adam Cone opened the original shop during the 1990s. The business re-opened in the C–ID in 2011.

World Pizza filed a complaint against OrderAhead. World Pizza has been a vendor at the C–ID Night Market and the C–ID Business Improvement Area's annual C–ID Summer Festival, also known as Dragon Fest.

Among notable diners is Amanda Knox, according to Northwest Asian Weekly. In 2018, World Pizza introduced a reusable pizza box made by a regular customer; according to The Stranger, the pizzeria sold the boxes for "$5 along with a free slice".

== Reception ==
Chona Kasinger selected the Basil Walnut Pesto pizza to represent the district in Thrillist 2014 overview of the best pizza in fifteen Seattle neighborhoods. Bradley Foster and Emma Banks included World Pizza in the website's 2021 overview of Seattle's best pizza. Allecia Vermillion and Rosin Saez included the business in Seattle Metropolitan's 2019 list of the best restaurants in the C–ID.

== See also ==
- List of vegetarian and vegan restaurants
