= G-Zen =

Vegan restaurant in Branford, Connecticut, US

- Interactive map of G-Zen

Restaurant information
- Established: 2011
- Owners: Ami Beach, Mark Shadle
- Chef: Mark Shadle, Ami Beach
- Food type: Vegan
- Location: 2 East Main St, Branford, Connecticut, 06405, United States
- Coordinates: 41.285196°N 72.809434°W
- Website: g-zen.com

G-Zen is a vegan fine-dining restaurant in Branford, Connecticut.

== History ==
The restaurant was established in 2011. Chef-owners Ami Beach and Mark Shadle source ingredients from their own farm for the menu, which changes daily.

== Reception ==
"Upscale spiritual retreat center", says Stephanie Lyness of The New York Times in 2012.

== See also ==
- List of vegetarian and vegan restaurants
