= Obon Shokudo =

Japanese restaurant in Portland, Oregon, U.S.

- The restaurant's exterior, 2026
- Interactive map of Obon Shokudo

Restaurant information
- Food type: Japanese
- Location: 720 Southeast Grand Avenue, Portland, Multnomah, Oregon, 97214, United States
- Coordinates: 45.5176°N 122.6606°W
- Website: obonpdx.com

Obon Shokudo is a vegan restaurant that serves Japanese cuisine in Portland, Oregon, United States.

== Description ==
The vegan restaurant Obon Shokudo serves Japanese cuisine in southeast Portland's Buckman neighborhood. The interior has yellow walls and rustic wood tables. The menu includes bento boxes, curries, a katsu burger, noodles, okonomiyaki, onigiri, and soups, including kenchin-jiru.

== History ==
The business started at farmers' markets in 2014 and began operating a stall at the Morrison Market in February 2020. Like many restaurants, the business operated via delivery and take-out during the COVID-19 pandemic. In 2021, the restaurant relocated to Southeast Grand Avenue, in the space that previously housed Kachinka. In 2023, Obon Shokudo closed for a day as part of a strike in solidarity with Palestine. In 2024, the business was featured in The V Word, a documentary series about veganism. Obon Shokudo was a vendor at the first Veganizer Asian Market at the Redd on Salmon Street in 2025.

== Reception ==
Obon Shokudo won in the Best New Restaurant category in VegOut magazine's annual awards in 2022. Margot Bigg included the business in VegNews's 2022 list of the city's five best international vegan restaurants. Waz Wu included the business in Eater Portland's 2022 overview of the city's "standout" vegan curries and 2024 list of the "most comforting" vegan noodle soups. The website's Brooke Jackson-Glidden recommended the kenchin-jiru in a 2023 list of recommended "sick day delivery standbys". In 2025, the website's Janey Wong, Anastasia Sloan, and Paolo Bicchieri included the business in lists of the best Japanese restaurants in the Portland metropolitan area, the city's 19 best vegan restaurants, and Portland's best restaurants for lunch, respectively. Alex Frane and Katherine Chew Hamilton included the business in Portland Monthly's 2026 overview of the best vegan restaurants for breakfast, lunch, and dinner.

== See also ==
- List of Japanese restaurants
- List of vegetarian and vegan restaurants
