= Orange & Blossom =

Bakery in Portland, Oregon, U.S.

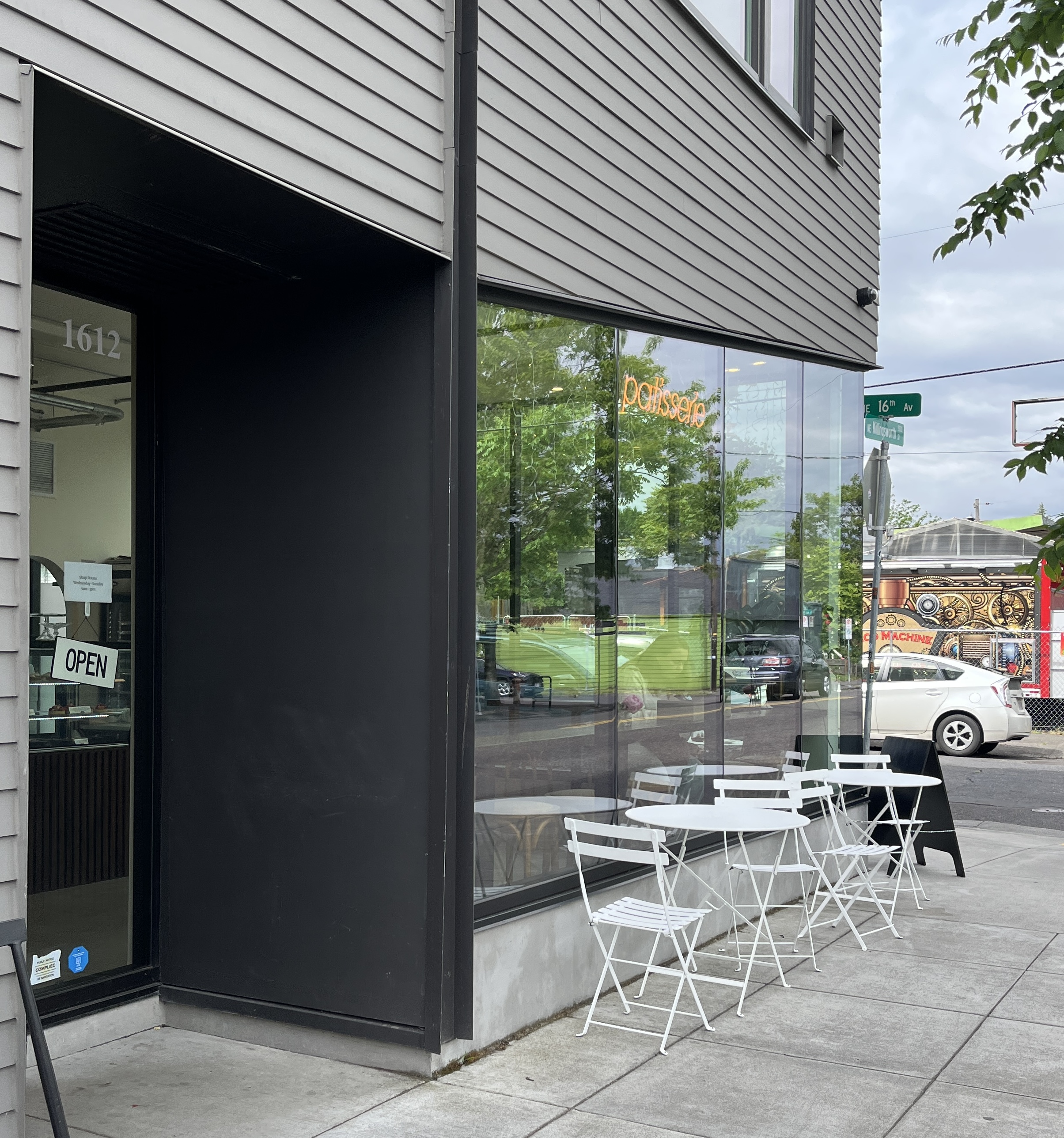
- The bakery's exterior, 2025
- Interactive map of Orange & Blossom

Restaurant information
- Established: 2019
- Owner: Marisa Kroes
- Pastry chef: Marisa Kroes
- Location: 1612 Northeast Killingsworth Street, Portland, Multnomah, Oregon, 97211, United States
- Coordinates: 45.5626°N 122.6484°W
- Website: orangeblossomco.com

Orange & Blossom is a vegan pâtisserie in Portland, Oregon, United States. Pastry chef Marisa Kroes launched the bakery in 2019, initially as a pop-up at farmers' markets. The business moved into a brick and mortar location in northeast Portland's Vernon neighborhood in 2023.

== Description ==
The organic, vegan pâtisserie Orange & Blossom (O&B) operates in northeast Portland, Oregon's Vernon neighborhood. The bakery's interior has vintage bentwood chairs, a burnt orange-colored couch, and floral wallpaper. The business has served various baked goods such as apricot almond buns, lemon elderflower buns, rosemary focaccia, cardamom carrot cake, sourdough chocolate chip cookies, buckwheat ganache brownies, peanut butter miso cookies, pistachio olive oil cake, and tahini sticky buns. The miso brown sugar cookies have red miso mixed with a brown butter vanilla cookie base and sprinkled with Jacobsen salt.

== History ==
Pastry chef Marisa Kroes launched O&B in 2019. In 2020, the business operated via pop-ups at farmers' markets (including the market at Portland State University), an online store, and a kitchen in southeast Portland. For the holiday season, O&B offered hazelnut financiers with mountain rose apple slices, ginger molasses cookies, miso caramels, and peppermint "oreo" cookies. In 2023, Kroes announced plans to open a brick and mortar shop at 16th and Killingsworth in northeast Portland in late September. The bakery opened in the space on November 4.

== Reception ==
Waz Wu and Rebecca Roland included O&B in Eater Portland's 2024 list of the city's sixteen best vegan and vegetarian restaurants. The website's Rebecca Roland, Kara Stokes, and Janey Wong included the miso brown sugar cookies in a 2024 overview of Portland's "best decadent" cookies. Brenna Houck included O&B in the website's 2025 list of the Portland's eighteen best vegan and vegetarian restaurants. Michelle Lopez and Janey Wong included the business in Eater Portland's 2025 overview of the city's best bakeries. O&B won in the Best Vegan Bakery category of VegNews magazine's second annual Restaurant Awards in 2024. The magazine recommended the hazelnut apple financier and the miso butterscotch sticky bun.

== See also ==
- List of bakeries
- List of vegetarian and vegan restaurants
