= Nix (restaurant) =

Defunct restaurant in New York City, U.S.

- Interactive map of Nix

Restaurant information
- Closed: 2020
- Food type: American; vegetarian
- Location: 72 University Place, New York City, New York, 10003, United States
- Coordinates: 40°43′59.8″N 73°59′37.1″W

Nix was a vegetarian restaurant in Greenwich Village, New York City. The restaurant served American cuisine and had received a Michelin star. It closed in 2020, during the COVID-19 pandemic.

== See also ==
- Impact of the COVID-19 pandemic on the restaurant industry in the United States
- List of defunct restaurants of the United States
- List of Michelin-starred restaurants in New York City
- List of vegetarian and vegan restaurants
