= Penny Cafeteria =

Defunct restaurant in New York City, U.S.

Coordinates: 40°44′45″N 73°58′39.6″W

- Interactive map of Penny Cafeteria

Restaurant information
- Established: 1931
- Location: New York City, New York, United States

Penny Cafeteria was a vegetarian restaurant located at 511 Third Avenue between 34th Street and 35th Street in the Murray Hill neighborhood of Manhattan in New York City. It opened during the Great Depression, in December 1931. The establishment was opened by the Bernarr MacFadden Foundation, begun by publisher Bernarr MacFadden, in September 1930. MacFadden based the concept on a similar business he opened in the winter of 1902, located at City Hall Place.

The philanthropist had resources of $5,000,000. It enabled the unemployed of New York City to buy food at 1 cent per dish and they could also purchase a five-course meal for 5 cents. From its opening on December 29, 1931, Penny Cafeteria served meals to 2,500 to 3,000 customers per day. On opening day, the restaurant offered cracked wheat, Scotch oatmeal, lima bean soup, green pea soup, soaked prunes, seeded raisins, whole wheat bread, butter, raisin coffee, and cereal coffee. MacFadden initially planned to keep the eatery open until May 1932. Food was sold at about cost and was provided twenty-four hours daily when demand warranted. MacFadden opened similar restaurants at five other locations within the next year.

In July 1940, a penny cafeteria opened at the Bowery branch of the Y.M.C.A. at 8 East Third Street. On its first day, July 1, the establishment served more than 900 needy youths. The cafeteria was funded by proceeds of the Wilhelm Loewenstein Foundation. It offered three meals for twenty-five cents.

== See also ==
- List of vegetarian and vegan restaurants
