= Farm Spirit =

Defunct restaurant in Portland, Oregon, U.S.

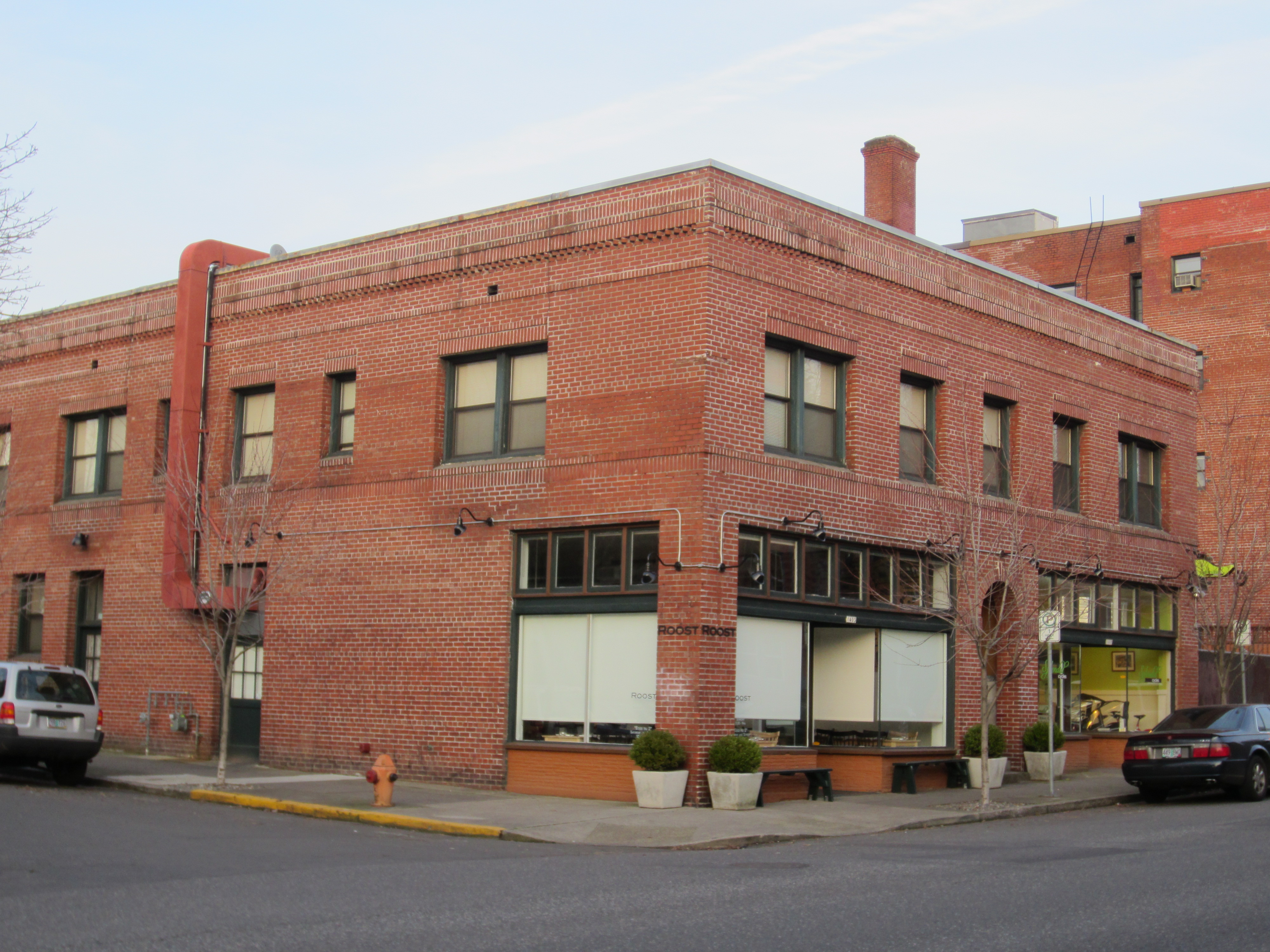
- 2012 photograph of the building that later housed Farm Spirit
- Interactive map of Farm Spirit

Restaurant information
- Established: 2015
- Owner: Aaron Adams
- Chef: Aaron Adams
- Food type: Pacific Northwest; vegan
- Location: 1403 Southeast Belmont Street, Portland, Multnomah, Oregon, 97214, United States
- Coordinates: 45.5166°N 122.6514°W
- Website: farmspiritpdx.com

Farm Spirit was a vegan fine-dining restaurant that served Pacific Northwest cuisine in Portland, Oregon, in the United States. Reservations were ticketed for 10-to-15-course tasting menus. The restaurant opened in 2015, relocated in 2019, and closed in 2020, during the COVID-19 pandemic.

== Description ==
Farm Spirit was a vegan fine-dining restaurant in southeast Portland's Buckman neighborhood. According to Moon Portland (2019), the restaurant served "Cascadian" (or Pacific Northwest) cuisine. The menu included salt-brined celtuce and pinot-noir-braised creminis.

== History ==
Owner and executive chef Aaron Adams opened the restaurant in 2015. Kei Ohdera was also a chef.

In early 2019, Farm Spirit moved from Southeast Morrison Street to the space previously occupied by Roost on Southeast Belmont Street.

Farm Spirit closed in 2020, during the COVID-19 pandemic.

== Reception ==
In 2017, Tasting Table named Farm Spirit one of the eight best vegan restaurants in the U.S. In 2018, USA Today named Farm Spirit one of the ten best vegan restaurants in the country.

== See also ==
- COVID-19 pandemic in Portland, Oregon
- Impact of the COVID-19 pandemic on the restaurant industry in the United States
- List of defunct restaurants of the United States
- List of Pacific Northwest restaurants
- List of vegetarian and vegan restaurants
