= The Uncanny (bar) =

Defunct bar and restaurant in Portland, Oregon, U.S.

- Interactive map of The Uncanny

Restaurant information
- Established: 2023
- Location: 3560 North Mississippi Avenue, Portland, Multnomah, Oregon, 97227, United States
- Coordinates: 45.5487°N 122.6753°W
- Website: theuncannypdx.com

The Uncanny was a bar in Portland, Oregon. Established in 2023, it was named one of the best new bars in the U.S. by Esquire in 2024. It closed permanently in May 2026.

== Description ==
The Uncanny was a bar on Mississippi Avenue, in the North Portland part of the Boise neighborhood. It had a patio, and the interior had red neon lighting and black banquettes. Among drinks were the Vieux Carré (coconut Scotch whisky and tepache sherry) the Sazerac (Träkál, a Patagonian spirit, and chanterelle), and the Devil in Disguise, which had sotol, fernet, and rum. The Uncanny served vegan food.

== History ==
The Uncanny opened in 2023, in the space that previously housed Psychic Bar and, earlier, Muddy's Coffeehouse.

For Halloween, The Uncanny hosted a pop-up menu called "The House of Unholy". Among drinks on the special menu were the Machete Incident (espresso-infused rum, coconut cream, and Campari-soaked strawberry), the Rest in Pieces (cocoa butter-infused rum, peanut butter batter, and chocolate whip), and the non-alcoholic Treatz, which had hibiscus, Sour Patch Kids, pineapple, orgeat, and Pop Rocks.

The bar hosted vegan food residencies in 2024. It closed permanently in May 2026.

== Reception ==
Portland Monthly described The Uncanny as "a cocktail bar fit for a David Lynch set". Brenna Houck included the business in Eater Portland's 2025 list of the city's eighteen best vegan and vegetarian restaurants.

== See also ==
- List of defunct restaurants of the United States
- List of vegetarian and vegan restaurants
