= Candle Cafe =

Vegan restaurant in New York, US

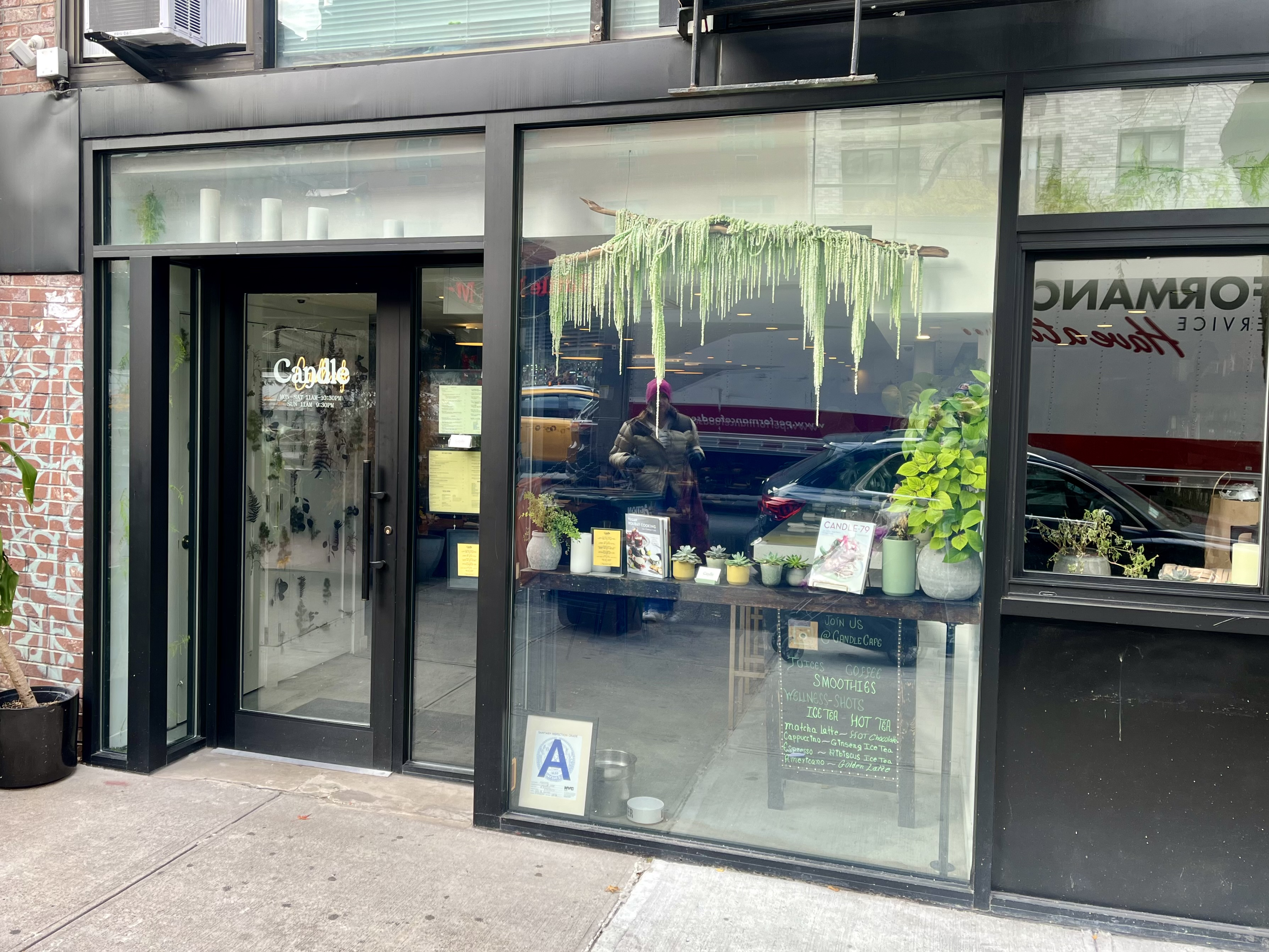
- Candle Cafe in December 2023
- Interactive map of Candle Cafe

Restaurant information
- Established: 1994; 32 years ago
- Closed: 2020; 6 years ago
- Owners: Joy Pierson and Bart Potenza
- Food type: Vegan
- Location: Multiple locations in Manhattan, New York, New York, United States
- Website: candlecafe.com

Candle Cafe, Candle West and Candle 79 were fine-dining vegan restaurants in Manhattan, New York City.

Candle Cafe opened in 1994 as a juice bar and health food cafe, and was owned by Joy Pierson and Bart Potenza. The Potenzas used $53,000 they won in the New York State Take Five lottery in 1993 to start the restaurant.

Celebrities such as Woody Harrelson were known to frequent the restaurant.

All three restaurants closed as of December 2020. However, a new Candle Cafe location reopened at 388 3rd Ave in March 2023.

== Reviews ==
In 2015 PETA named Candle 79 one of the six best vegan fine-dining restaurants in the U.S., BuzzFeed named them one of 24 "bucket list" vegan restaurants, and vegan studies scholar Laura Wright referenced them as one of two "famous vegan restaurants."

In 2013 Travel + Leisure named Candle 79 one of the best vegetarian restaurants in the U.S.

In 2013, Zagat's gave Candle Cafe a 25 rating for food, making it the second-highest rated of the 46 New York City health food restaurants rated by the survey.

Shape named Candle 79 one of the top 10 upscale vegan restaurants in the United States, calling them "one of the 'Grand Dames'" of upscale vegan dining.

== Works ==
- Joy Pierson, The Candle Cafe Cookbook: More Than 150 Enlightened Recipes from New York's Renowned Vegan Restaurant, Random House (2003). ISBN 978-0-609-80981-5
- Joy Pierson, Angel Ramos & Jorge Pineda, Candle*79 Cookbook: Modern Vegan Classics from New York's Premier Sustainable Restaurant, Ten Speed Press (2011). ISBN 978-1-60774-012-4

== See also ==
- List of vegetarian and vegan restaurants
