= List of vegetarian and vegan restaurants =

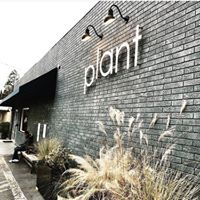
Plant, a vegan restaurant in Asheville, North Carolina

This is an incomplete list of vegetarian and vegan restaurants. Vegetarian cuisine refers to food that meets vegetarian standards by not including meat and animal tissue products. For lacto-ovo vegetarianism (the most common type of vegetarianism in the Western world), eggs and dairy products such as milk and cheese are permitted. For lacto vegetarianism, the earliest known type of vegetarianism (recorded in India), dairy products are permitted, but eggs are not. The strictest forms of vegetarianism are veganism, raw veganism, and fruitarianism, which exclude all animal products, including dairy products, as well as eggs and even some refined sugars if filtered and whitened with bone char.

== Notable vegetarian restaurants ==
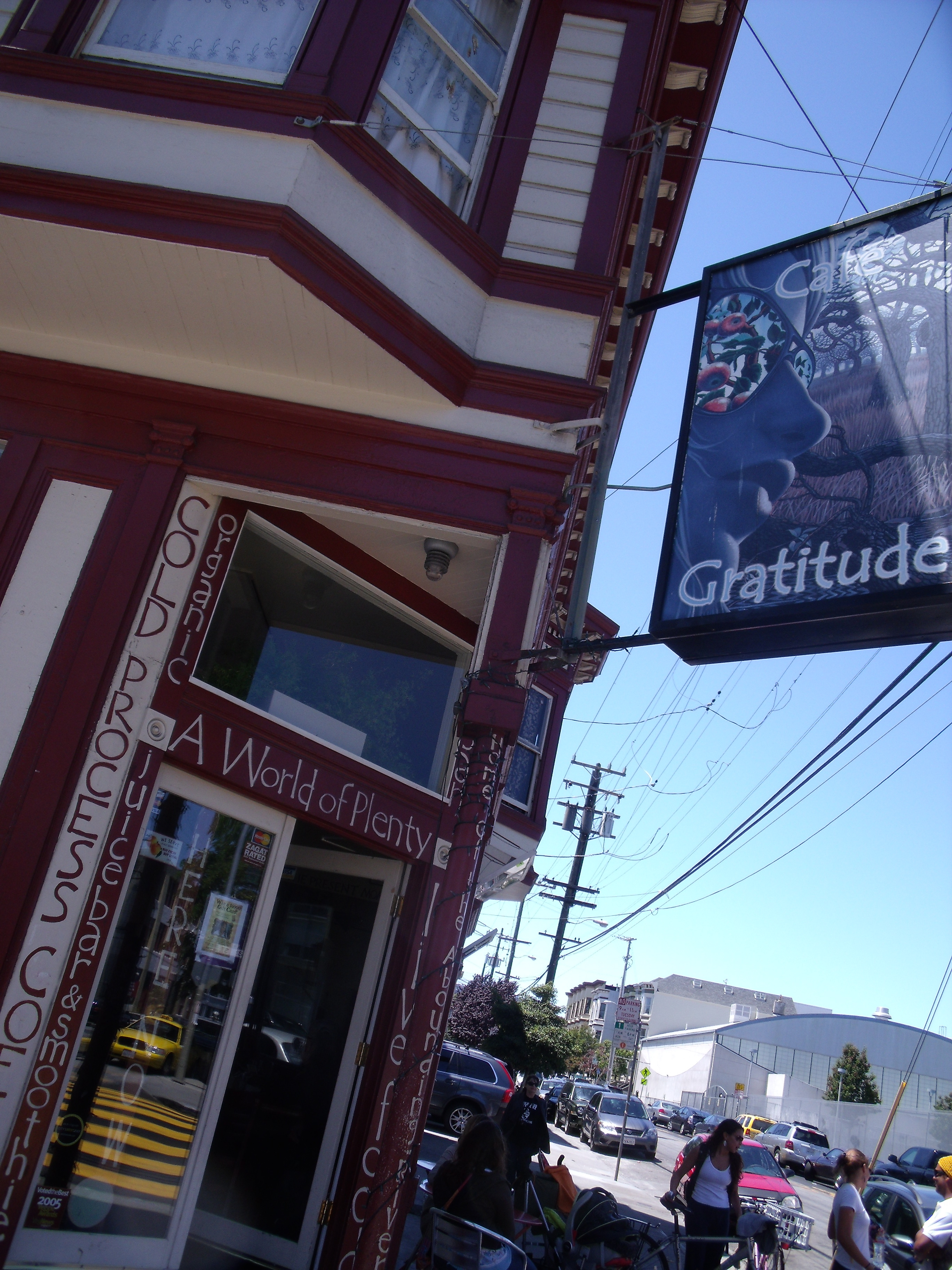
Café Gratitude, San Francisco, California, US

An Annapoorna Gowrishankar location, India

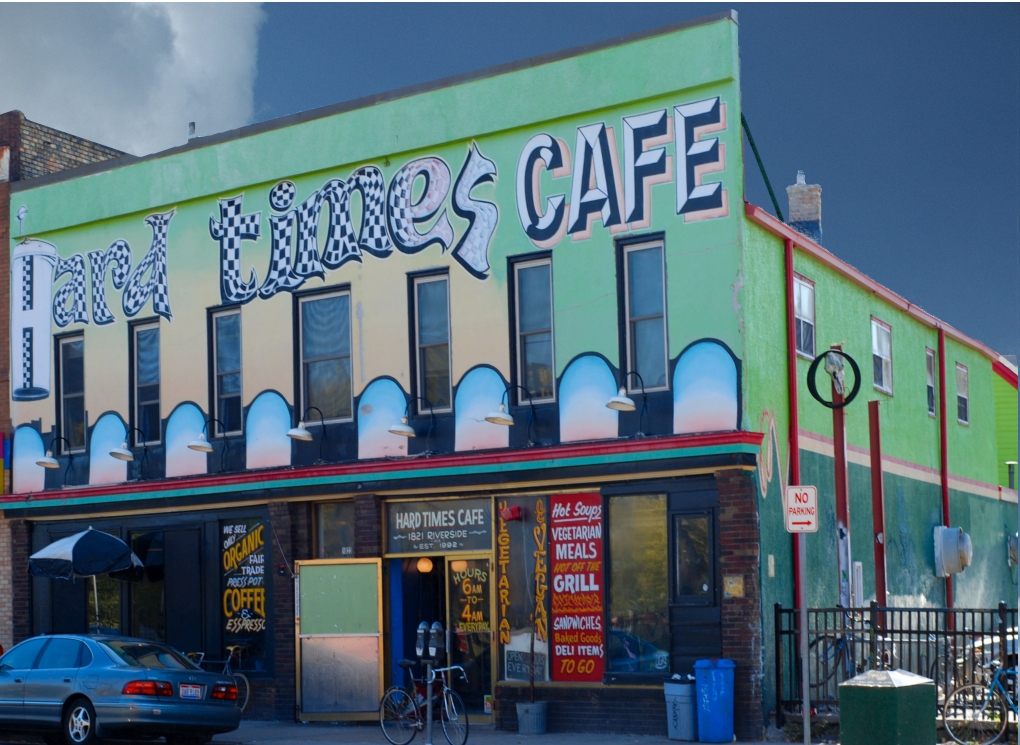
The Hard Times Cafe in Minneapolis, Minnesota, US

- Adyar Ananda Bhavan, India, Singapore, Malaysia, Australia, Kenya, and United States
- Alice, Ottawa, Ontario, Canada
- Annalakshmi, Malaysia, Australia, Singapore and India
- Bloodroot, Bridgeport, Connecticut, US
- Café Gratitude, five locations, California, US
- Café Paradiso, Cork, Ireland
- Çiğköftem, Turkish fast-food chain, 130 restaurants as of 2020
- Claire's Corner Copia, New Haven, Connecticut, US
- Clover Food Lab, Cambridge, Massachusetts, US
- Cranks, London, England
- Dirt Candy, New York City, New York, US
- Govinda's Restaurant, various locations all over the world
- Goli Vada Pav, India
- Green Elephant Vegetarian Bistro, Portland, Maine, US, and Portsmouth, New Hampshire, US
- Greens Restaurant, San Francisco, California, US
- Hard Times Cafe, Minneapolis, Minnesota, US
- Harlow, Portland, Oregon
- Hiltl Restaurant, Zurich, Switzerland
- InSpiral Lounge, Camden Lock, England
- Kesar Da Dhaba, Amritsar
- Lentil as Anything, Melbourne and Sydney, Australia
- Mixt Greens, San Francisco, California
- Murugan Idli Shop, India and Singapore, a chain of vegetarian restaurants headquartered in Madurai
- The New Riverside Cafe, Minneapolis, Minnesota, US
- Namma Veedu Vasanta Bhavan, Chennai, Trichy and Villupuram, India
- Natural Selection
- New Woodlands Hotel, Chennai
- Next Level Burger
- Nix, New York City
- Off the Griddle, Portland, Oregon
- Penny Cafeteria, New York City, New York, US
- The Pitman Vegetarian Hotel, Birmingham, England
- Quay Co-op, Cork City, Ireland
- Saravana Bhavan, a Chennai-based restaurant with 110 branches
- The Sound Lounge, Sutton, south London.
- Sree Annapoorna Sree Gowrishankar, Coimbatore, India
- Taïm, New York City, New York, US
- Veggie Galaxy, Cambridge, Massachusetts, US
- Veggie Victory, Nigeria
- Vidyarthi Bhavan, South Bengaluru Bangalore, India
- The Whole Bowl
- World Pizza, Seattle

== Notable vegan restaurants ==
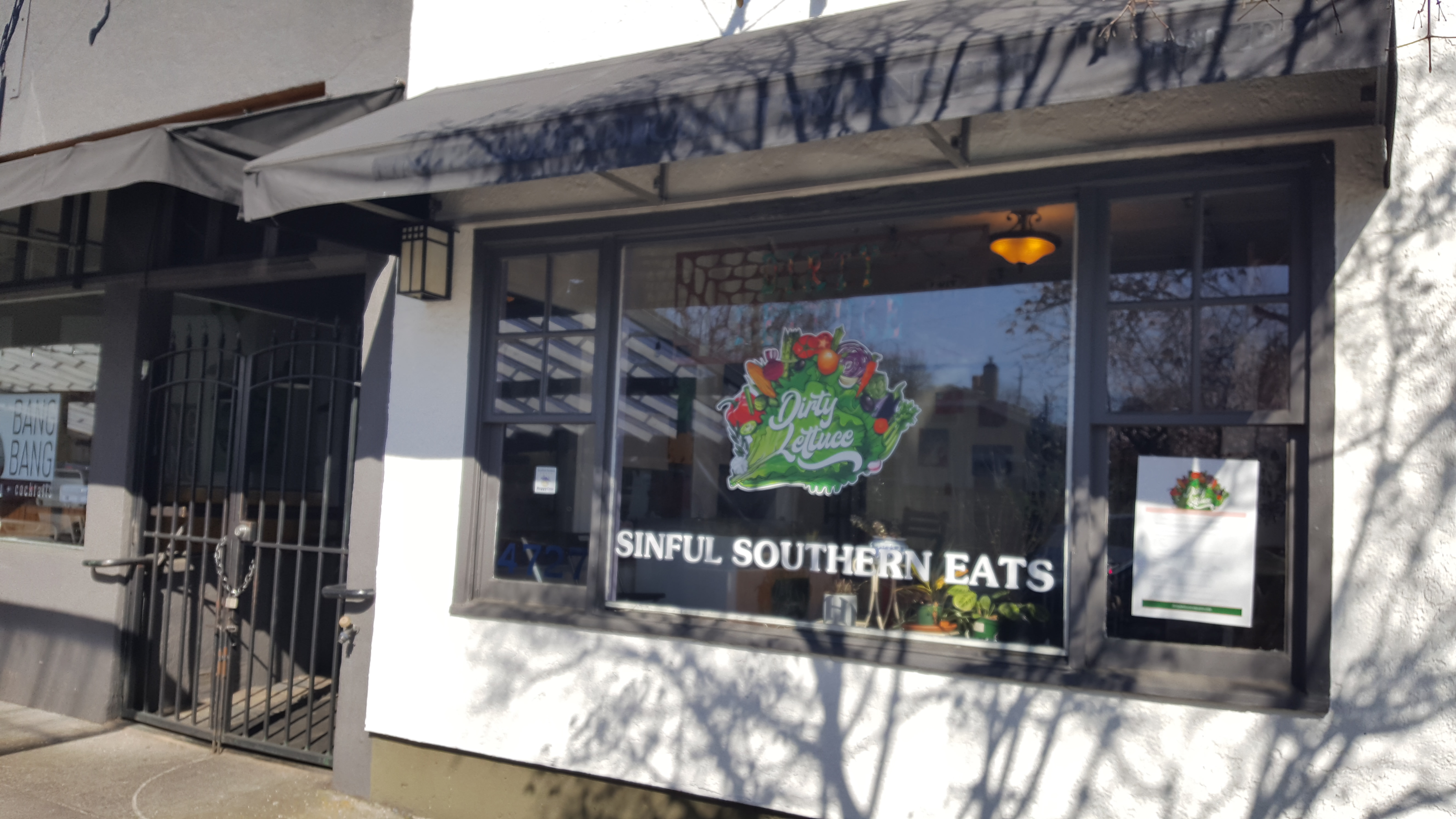
Dirty Lettuce, Portland, Oregon

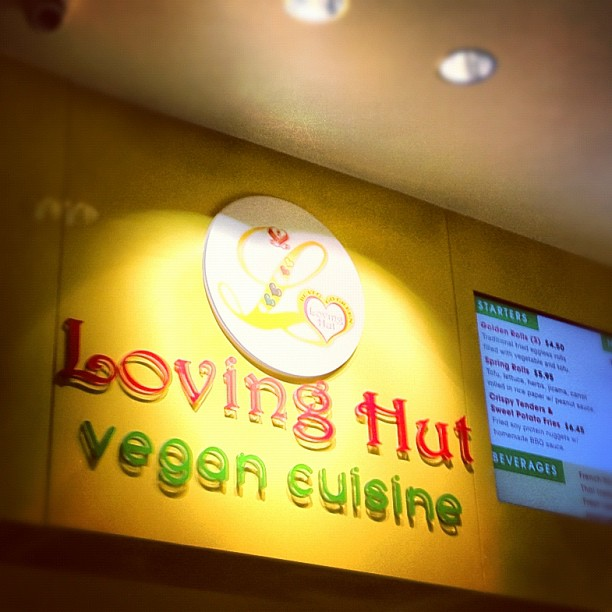
Loving Hut, San Francisco, US

- Astera, Portland, Oregon
- Baby Blue Pizza, Portland, Oregon
- Bakers Bench, Los Angeles, California
- Ben & Esther's Vegan Jewish Deli
- Blossoming Lotus, Portland, Oregon, US
- Boxcar Pizza
- Candle Cafe, three locations, New York City, New York, US
- Coffee Beer, Portland, Oregon
- Crossroads Kitchen, Los Angeles, California, US
- Cinnaholic, 14 locations, US
- DC Vegetarian
- Dirty Lettuce, Portland, Oregon
- Doe Donuts, Portland, Oregon
- Dough Joy, Seattle
- Earth Burger
- The Easy Vegan, Denver, Colorado
- Eb & Bean
- Elizabeth's Gone Raw, Washington, D.C., US
- Farm Spirit, Portland, Oregon
- Feral
- Fermenter, Portland, Oregon
- Frankie & Jo's
- G-Zen, Branford, Connecticut, US
- Ice Queen
- Jade Rabbit, Portland, Oregon
- Jet Black Coffee Company
- La Bartola, Toronto, Ontario, Canada
- Life on Mars, Seattle
- Little Pine (restaurant), Los Angeles, California, US
- Lord of the Fries 19 locations in Australia and 4 in New Zealand.
- Loving Hut, 138 locations, Asia, Australia, Europe, North America, and South America
- Mama Đút, Portland, Oregon
- Memento Mori Cafe
- Mirisata
- Mis Tacones, Portland, Oregon
- Mondragon Bookstore & Coffeehouse, Winnipeg, Manitoba, Canada (closed January 2014)
- Native Foods Cafe, 14 locations, California, Colorado, Illinois, and Oregon, US
- Norah
- Obon Shokudo
- ONA, the first vegan restaurant in France to win a Michelin star
- Orange & Blossom
- Paradox Cafe
- Petunia's Pies & Pastries
- Pink Peacock, Govanhill, Glasgow, Scotland
- Plant, Asheville, North Carolina, US
- Plates (restaurant), London, the first vegan restaurant in the UK to win a Michelin star
- Plum Bistro, Seattle
- Pure Food and Wine
- Purezza, British pizza and Italian food chain from Brighton, UK
- Red and Black Cafe, Portland, Oregon, US (closed March 2015)
- Shoofly Vegan Bakery, Portland, Oregon
- The Sudra, Oregon
- Sweetpea Baking Company
- Two Dollar Radio Headquarters, Columbus, Ohio, US
- The Uncanny, Portland, Oregon
- Unicorn Bake Shop, Portland, Oregon
- Vedge, Philadelphia, Pennsylvania, US
- VeganBurg, Singapore and San Francisco, California, US
- Veggie Grill, 29 locations, California, Oregon, and Washington, US
- Vertical Diner
- Virtuous Pie, Vancouver, Canada

== See also ==
- Healthy diet
- List of fictional vegetarian and vegan characters
- List of vegetarian and vegan companies
- Lists of restaurants
