= Relish (magazine) =

American cooking and lifestyle magazine

- Editor: Jill Melton
- Categories: Cooking
- Frequency: Monthly
- Total circulation: 15,000,000
- First issue: February 2006
- Company: PGoA Media
- Country: United States
- Language: English
- Website: www.relish.com

Relish is an American cooking, food, and lifestyle magazine, website, and cooking show founded in 2006. Each month, the magazine features articles on cooking, dining, recipes, and entertaining.

The magazine is published by New York City and Nashville-based PGoA Media.

== Editors ==
- Jill Melton (2006–present)
