= Mosier =

Mosier may refer to:

- Mosier (surname)
- Mosier, Oregon, a city in Wasco County, Oregon, United States
  - Jefferson Mosier House in Mosier, Oregon
  - Mosier Mounds Complex near Mosier, Oregon
- Dr. J. R. Mosier Office at Meadville, Crawford County, Pennsylvania, United States
