= Reuter House =

Reuter House may refer to either of two historic houses in the United States or one in Canada:

- Dr. J. A. Reuter House, The Dalles, Oregon
- Louis and Mathilde Reuter House, Austin, Texas

There is also a designated Heritage Property at 270 Drewry Avenue near Yonge Street named Reuter House in Toronto Canada
