= Fort Dalles =

US Army outpost

- The Dalles, Oregon at 45.5997222°N 121.1841667°W
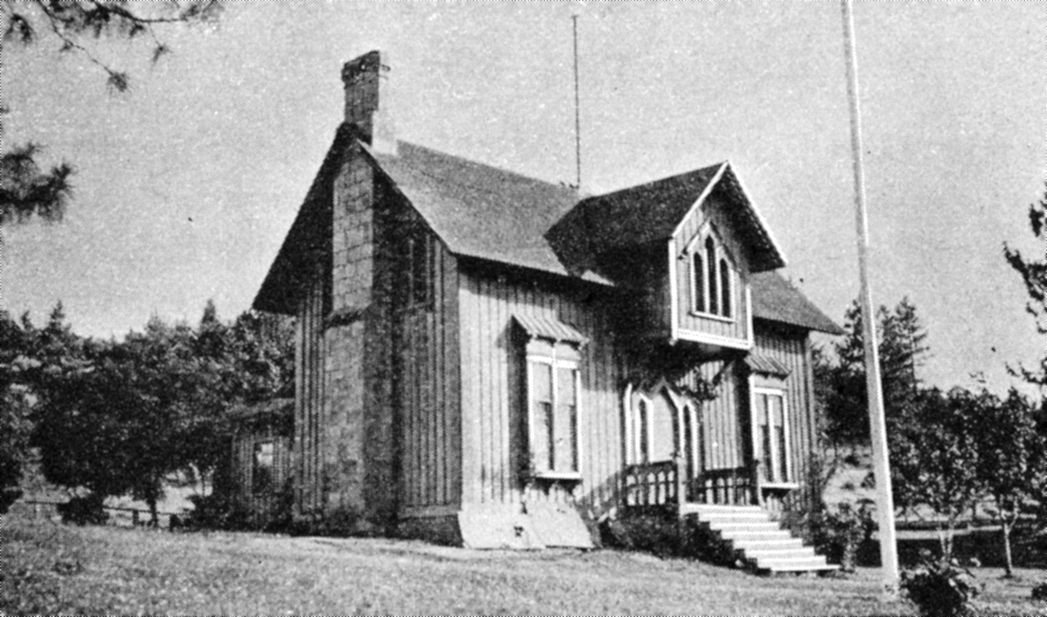
- The Surgeon’s Quarters of Fort Dalles

Site information
- Type: Military base
- Controlled by: United States Army

Site history
- Built: 1850
- Built by: Major Tucker
- In use: 1850–1867
- Materials: wood
- Demolished: 1867

Garrison information
- Past commanders: George Wright
- Garrison: 9th Infantry
- Fort Dalles Surgeon's Quarters
- U.S. National Register of Historic Places
- Location: 15th and Garrison streets The Dalles, Oregon
- Area: 0.8 acres (0.32 ha)
- Built: 1857
- Built by: Scholl, Louis; Jordan, Capt. Thomas
- Architect: Scholl, Louis, based on design by A. J. Downing
- Architectural style: Gothic Revival
- NRHP reference No.: 71000682
- Added to NRHP: September 10, 1971

Fort Dalles was a United States Army outpost located on the Columbia River at the present location of The Dalles, Oregon, in the United States. Built when Oregon was a territory, the post was used mainly for dealing with wars with Native Americans. The post was first known as Camp Drum and then Fort Drum.

== Construction ==
The first post was built on a site which overlooked an encampment used by Lewis and Clark in October 1805. This post was built in 1838 by the militia of the Oregon Provisional Government under the command of Henry A. G. Lee during the Cayuse War and was named Fort Lee. The post was built at the site of the former Wascopam Mission operated by the Methodist Mission.

In the fall of 1849 United States Army troops arrived in the new Oregon Territory. This rifle regiment occupied the now-abandoned Fort Lee at Wascopum (now The Dalles) on the Columbia River. A log fort was constructed in 1850 under the supervision of Major Tucker, and named Camp Drum. When the United States Congress changed the land requirements for Army forts to 1 square mile (2.6 km^{2}) from 10 square miles (26 km^{2}), suddenly Camp Drum's tiny military contingent could control the land it required. Although no stockade was built around the post, Camp Drum became Fort Drum on May 21, 1853, and then Fort Dalles on June 21, 1853.

New buildings were built from 1856 to 1858 under the direction of the commander Captain Thomas Jordan at a cost of nearly $500,000. Beginning in April 1858, the log fort was torn down and several new buildings, including a commander's house, barracks, and stables, were constructed under the command of Colonel George Wright, in command of the 9th Infantry.

== Operations ==
During the Yakima Wars Fort Dalles served as operational headquarters for the Army. The garrison had eight companies of troops assigned during this time. After these wars the post was downgraded to a quartermaster's depot in 1861. A fire burned down the officer's quarters in 1866. Fort Dalles was then abandoned in 1867.

== Fort Dalles Museum ==
The Fort Dalles Museum is located in the surgeon's quarters built in 1856 during the Yakima Wars, and the only remaining officer's house from that period. Exhibits include arrowheads, military and pioneer artifacts, period antiques and photographs, tools, weapons, saddles, and information about the fort.

The Anderson Homestead includes the 1895 Anderson House, which is a Swedish log house, a granary and a barn. Tours are included with admission to the museum.

There is also a building housing antique horse-drawn wagons and carriages, early automobiles, and other vehicles.

The Fort Dalles Surgeon's Quarters is listed in the National Register of Historic Places. It is considered one of Oregon's finest examples of Gothic Revival architecture.

== See also ==
- National Register of Historic Places listings in Wasco County, Oregon
- Malcolm A. Moody House
