= National Register of Historic Places listings in Wasco County, Oregon =

Location of Wasco County in Oregon

This list presents the full set of buildings, structures, objects, sites, or districts designated on the National Register of Historic Places in Wasco County, Oregon, United States, and offers brief descriptive information about each of them. The National Register recognizes places of national, state, or local historic significance across the United States. Out of over 90,000 National Register sites nationwide, Oregon is home to over 2,000, and 35 of those are found partially or wholly in Wasco County.

This National Park Service list is complete through NPS recent listings posted September 18, 2026.

== Current listings ==
	Name on the Register	Image	Date listed	Location	City or town	Description
1	Lewis Anderson House, Barn and Granary	Lewis Anderson House, Barn and Granary	March 20, 1980 (#80003387)	508 W. 16th Street; 45°35′44″N 121°11′52″W	The Dalles	This well-preserved ensemble of 1890s Swedish American vernacular architecture was originally located on Pleasant Ridge, south of The Dalles. The buildings were relocated in 1972 to restore and protect them, and have been managed as a house museum since that time.
2	Antelope School	Antelope School	June 7, 2016 (#16000347)	45500 McGreer Street; 44°54′47″N 120°43′26″W	Antelope	
3	Balch Hotel	Balch Hotel	September 8, 1987 (#87001469)	40 S. Main Street; 45°27′02″N 121°07′53″W	Dufur	This hotel was built in 1908 to serve travelers connecting between the railroad and stagecoaches. Its advanced amenities and the regular presence of salesmen made it a center of the Dufur community. Its fortunes declined with the Great Depression and the failure of the railroad, but it has remained in continuous use to the present.
4	Barlow Road	Barlow Road	April 13, 1992 (#92000334)	Mount Hood National Forest (Note: The Barlow Road is a linear district that runs north of and roughly parallel to the line of the White and Salmon rivers from southwest of Wamic to Rhododendron. See also Hood River and Clackamas counties.); 45°13′50″N 121°34′47″W	Wamic to Rhododendron	Beginning with its construction by Sam Barlow in 1846, this toll road provided the first overland connection for wagons between The Dalles and Oregon City over Mount Hood, and offered a majority of Oregon Trail emigrants an alternative to the hazardous raft passage down the Columbia River from The Dalles to Fort Vancouver.
5	Bennett–Williams House	Bennett–Williams House	February 27, 1986 (#86000291)	608 W. 6th Street; 45°36′09″N 121°11′35″W	The Dalles	Built in 1899 for prominent local lawyer, judge, and Oregon Supreme Court justice Alfred S. Bennett, this house is the most outstanding and best preserved example of Queen Anne architecture in The Dalles. It later became the home of Edward M. Williams, a notable local merchant.
6	Columbia River Highway Historic District	Columbia River Highway Historic District	December 12, 1983 (#83004168)	Roughly along the south side of the Columbia River (Note: The Columbia River Highway Historic District is a linear district with the Chenoweth Creek Bridge, The Dalles, at its east end, and the Sandy River Bridge, Troutdale, at the west end. See also Hood River and Multnomah counties.); 45°40′56″N 121°18′01″W	The Dalles to Troutdale	Constructed between 1913 and 1922, this was the first scenic highway in the United States. Designed specifically to provide visitors access to the most outstanding of the scenic features of the Columbia River Gorge, the highway is also an outstanding example of modern highway development for its pioneering advances in road engineering.
7	Columbia Southern Hotel	Columbia Southern Hotel	October 31, 1979 (#79002150)	4th and E Streets; 45°00′13″N 120°45′10″W	Shaniko	Built by the Columbia Southern Railway in 1900–1902 at the southern terminus of its line, this hotel is the most imposing structure in Shaniko. It was the hub of the community during the heyday of the local wool industry in the early 20th century. In addition to lodging, it served as saloon, bank, stage stop, dance hall, and general gathering place.
8	First Wasco County Courthouse	First Wasco County Courthouse	March 18, 1998 (#98000260)	410 W. 2nd Place; 45°36′13″N 121°11′19″W	The Dalles	One of only two remaining courthouses from prior to Oregon statehood, this building served Wasco County from 1859 until 1882, and then as The Dalles city hall until 1907. From its original downtown location, it has been moved several times before its current location.
9	Fivemile Rapids Site (35 WS 4)	Fivemile Rapids Site (35 WS 4)	December 19, 1974 (#74001719)	Address restricted (Note: Federal and state laws and practices restrict general public access to information regarding the specific location of this resource. In some cases, this is to protect archeological sites from vandalism, while in other cases it is restricted at the request of the owner.)	The Dalles	Yielding remains beginning soon after the end of the last glacial period, this archeological site (along with other nearby sites) provides a nearly continuous record of human occupation from at least 9000 BCE to 1820 CE. It also provides some of the earliest available evidence of fishing in human economy.
10	Fort Dalles Surgeon's Quarters	Fort Dalles Surgeon's Quarters	September 10, 1971 (#71000682)	15th and Garrison Streets; 45°35′46″N 121°11′50″W	The Dalles	The U.S. Army built this Gothic Revival-style house ca. 1857 to serve the medical officer of Fort Dalles. The Army occupied Fort Dalles from 1850 to 1867, (Note: The Army established Camp Drum in 1850. The post became Fort Drum and then Fort Dalles in 1853.) using it as a base of operations for the northwest Indian Wars. The Surgeon's Quarters, which became a museum in 1905, is one of only two surviving structures from Fort Dalles.
11	Edward French House	Edward French House	October 2, 1992 (#92001319)	515 Liberty Street; 45°36′04″N 121°11′14″W	The Dalles	Originally built ca. 1865, this home was acquired by the French family in 1892 and renovated in the Italianate style ca. 1900. Edward French, with his uncle Daniel and other family members, were prominent bankers and businessmen from early The Dalles until the 1920s.
12	Fulton–Taylor House	Fulton–Taylor House	September 9, 1993 (#93000920)	704 Case Street; 45°35′52″N 121°11′02″W	The Dalles	Built ca. 1858, this house was later occupied by two figures important in The Dalles. James Fulton (in residence 1864–1881), an American emigrant, became a rancher, militia leader, and state legislator. The Rev. O. D. Taylor (in residence 1891–1897) led a long-running but failed real estate scheme that was widely regarded as fraudulent.
13	Hugh Glenn House	Hugh Glenn House	February 20, 1991 (#91000064)	100 W. 9th Street; 45°35′52″N 121°11′20″W	The Dalles	This is one of the most notable and historically well-preserved Queen Anne-style houses in The Dalles. Hugh Glenn, a prominent architect and businessman in The Dalles, designed and built the house around 1882 and lived there until his death in 1927.
14	Heimrich–Seufert House	Heimrich–Seufert House	June 1, 1990 (#90000827)	303 E. 10th Street; 45°35′48″N 121°11′10″W	The Dalles	This 1927 Tudor Revival house was home to two prominent figures in commerce and industry in The Dalles. John G. Heimrich (in residence 1927–1931) was a leader in the development of short line railroads in Oregon. Edward Seufert (in residence 1933–1966) managed his family's locally important salmon cannery.
15	Orlando Humason House	Orlando Humason House	June 21, 1991 (#91000809)	908 Court Street; 45°35′51″N 121°11′13″W	The Dalles	Orlando Humason, the "Father of Wasco County", lived in this modest house from its construction in 1860 until his death in 1875. In the territorial and state legislatures, he introduced legislation establishing Wasco and Multnomah counties, and the City of The Dalles. He also championed construction of the Cascade Locks.
16	Imperial Stock Ranch Headquarters Complex	Imperial Stock Ranch Headquarters Complex	August 5, 1994 (#94000808)	Hinton Road; 45°05′55″N 120°47′22″W	Shaniko vicinity	
17	Indian Shaker Church and Gulick Homestead	Indian Shaker Church and Gulick Homestead	April 4, 1978 (#78003087)	Near the junction of Interstate 84 and U.S. Route 197; 45°36′21″N 121°08′08″W	The Dalles	The only remaining 19th century fishing homestead in Oregon, this complex was built by Henry Gulick on the Columbia riverbank in the 1890s. He included a church for his wife, Harriet, a member of the Wasco people. The church was the smallest of five Indian Shaker Church congregations in the state.
18	Joseph D. and Margaret Kelly House	Joseph D. and Margaret Kelly House	May 27, 1999 (#99000641)	921 E. 7th Street; 45°35′51″N 121°10′41″W	The Dalles	Joseph Kelly, a successful farmer during the establishment of wheat as a cash crop in Wasco County, built and retired to this house in 1908. He and his wife Margaret became prominent local philanthropic figures. The house is also notable for its unusual vernacular rendering of the Queen Anne style.
19	Maupin Section Foreman's House	Maupin Section Foreman's House	November 29, 2006 (#06001082)	601 Deschutes Access Road; 45°10′06″N 121°05′04″W	Maupin	This house recalls the "Last Great Railroad War" between transport barons E. H. Harriman and James J. Hill, as they raced to build routes up the Deschutes River canyon to Central Oregon. Harriman's company built the house to Union Pacific standard plans in 1910 to house the local track maintenance foreman. (Note: Most of Harriman's tracks and stations in the Deschutes canyon were abandoned in 1936. The other two buildings of the Maupin station, the depot and the maintenance crew bunk, were demolished by 1968.)
20	Malcolm A. Moody House	Malcolm A. Moody House	October 10, 1980 (#80003388)	300 W. 13th Street; 45°35′47″N 121°11′37″W	The Dalles	Believed to have been built in 1850 for noncommissioned officers at Camp Drum, this house may be the oldest remaining building in The Dalles. It was later occupied by mayor and U.S. Representative Malcolm A. Moody, and ultimately became a museum.
21	Jefferson Mosier House	Jefferson Mosier House	February 23, 1990 (#90000286)	704 3rd Avenue; 45°40′56″N 121°23′43″W	Mosier	Jefferson N. Mosier (1860–1928) first platted the town of Mosier in 1902 on what had been his father's donation land claim and promoted it for decades after. He built this prominent house in 1904, where he resided until his death. It is the only Queen Anne building in Mosier, and features many signature characteristics of the type.
22	Mosier Mounds Complex	Mosier Mounds Complex	February 24, 2003 (#03000053)	Address restricted	Mosier	This collection of stone walls, pits, and mounds amid a basalt talus slope is the largest and most complex of a number of similar Native American sites in the southern Columbia Plateau. The site predates the arrival of Europeans and probably the local ascendance of Chinookan peoples, but has resisted more precise dating or cultural affiliation.
23	Dr. J. A. Reuter House	Dr. J. A. Reuter House	June 27, 1997 (#97000578)	420 E. 8th Street; 45°35′49″N 121°10′59″W	The Dalles	John Alexander Reuter (1876–1954) practiced medicine in The Dalles for 44 years, joining a partnership that established the city's first hospital (1901) and nursing school. He bought this house in 1909 and transformed it into the city's finest example of the Craftsman style.
24	Rock Fort Campsite	Rock Fort Campsite	September 4, 1980 (#80003389)	W. 1st Street, at the Columbia River shore 45°36′25″N 121°11′17″W	The Dalles	The Lewis and Clark Expedition camped at this natural riverside fortification for three nights in 1805, just after passing Celilo Falls on its descent to the Pacific, and again for one night on its return journey. Here the expedition first made significant contact and commerce with the Chinookan-speaking peoples of the lower Columbia.
25	St. Peter's Roman Catholic Church	St. Peter's Roman Catholic Church	June 20, 1974 (#74001720)	3rd and Lincoln Streets; 45°36′10″N 121°11′15″W	The Dalles	The Dalles' original Catholic parish, established in 1848, outgrew its second church by 1890. This building was constructed in 1898 based on Otto Kleemann's adaptation of plans imported from Germany. Upon its completion, it was considered the finest Catholic church in Oregon. The 1898 building became a museum in the 1960s.
26	Shaniko Historic District	Shaniko Historic District	March 18, 1982 (#82003754)	U.S. Route 97 and Oregon Route 218; 45°00′15″N 120°45′09″W	Shaniko	
27	Edward F. Sharp Residential Ensemble	Edward F. Sharp Residential Ensemble	October 25, 1991 (#91001561)	400 and 404 E. 4th Street and 504 Federal Street; 45°35′57″N 121°10′55″W	The Dalles	Edward Sharp (1865–1954) was the county surveyor and roadmaster whose work underlies much of the development in Wasco County. He built this trio of houses (1895–1905) for himself, his family, and their employees in the Queen Anne and Craftsman styles.
28	The Dalles Carnegie Library	The Dalles Carnegie Library	December 8, 1978 (#78002325)	220 E. 4th Street; 45°36′00″N 121°11′01″W	The Dalles	This Beaux-Arts style Carnegie library was built in 1910 with a $10,000 grant. It was The Dalles' first public library and provided the seed for a small cluster of civic buildings, including the county courthouse and civic auditorium. In 1966, the library moved to a new facility and the Carnegie building became an arts center.
29	The Dalles Civic Auditorium	The Dalles Civic Auditorium	December 12, 1978 (#78002326)	323 E. 4th Street; 45°35′59″N 121°10′56″W	The Dalles	Dedicated in 1921 as The Dalles' memorial to veterans of World War I, this was also one of the earliest community centers in Oregon to serve multiple recreational needs. It housed an auditorium, gymnasium, ballroom, fireside reception room, and (briefly) a swimming pool.
30	The Dalles Commercial Historic District	The Dalles Commercial Historic District	November 4, 1986 (#86002953)	Roughly bounded by Interstate 84 and Laughlin, 5th, and Union Streets; 45°36′04″N 121°11′00″W	The Dalles	Strategically located at the eastern end of the Columbia River Gorge, The Dalles became the hub of the interior Northwest in the 19th and early 20th centuries. The buildings of the historic district, built between 1860 and 1938, (Note: The district's 1997 National Register nomination file listed the Port of The Dalles Grain Elevator, built in 1942, as a contributing resource in the district. However the grain elevator was subsequently removed, leaving 1938 as the most recent date of construction of a contributing building.) reflect the city's status and evolution as the commercial, governmental, and cultural center of Eastern Oregon.
31	John L. Thompson House	John L. Thompson House	November 6, 1980 (#80003390)	209 W. 3rd Street; 45°36′10″N 121°11′11″W	The Dalles	John Thompson, an emigrant and successful blacksmith, built his house in 1889 in a simple vernacular style. It underwent a major expansion in 1897 to become a prominent, Queen Anne residence. It represents the evolution of architecture in frontier towns, and is one of The Dalles' outstanding examples of the Queen Anne style.
32	Trevitt's Addition Historic District	Trevitt's Addition Historic District	June 20, 1995 (#95000686)	Roughly bounded by 2nd, Liberty, and 6th Streets and Mill Creek; 45°36′09″N 121°11′24″W	The Dalles	Victor Trevitt platted this first expansion of the original 1855 "Dalles City" townsite in 1860. The addition saw the first flour mill and electrical and water systems in The Dalles, and direct connection to important highway and rail networks. Surviving buildings in the district, primarily residential, reflect a spectrum of architectural styles from 1864 to 1937.
33	U.S. Post Office	U.S. Post Office	March 4, 1985 (#85000545)	100 W. 2nd Street; 45°36′09″N 121°11′05″W	The Dalles	Built in 1916 from standardized federal plans in the Greek Revival style, this was the first federal building in The Dalles and one of a set of nine built in Oregon in the 1910s. It remained in operation as a post office longer than seven of the other eight in that group.
34	John and Murta Van Dellen House	John and Murta Van Dellen House	February 20, 1991 (#91000063)	400 E. 8th Street; 45°35′50″N 121°11′02″W	The Dalles	Built in 1920, this is the outstanding example of a California bungalow in The Dalles. Original owner John Van Dellen was a prosperous lumber yard owner, and made use of the finest local building materials and craftsmanship in constructing his house.
35	Wasco Warehouse & Milling Company Hydroelectric Project Historic District	Wasco Warehouse & Milling Company Hydroelectric Project Historic District	June 14, 2023 (#100009054)	White River Rd. and Sherars Bridge Hwy. (OR 216); 45°14′45″N 121°05′50″W	Maupin vicinity	

== See also ==
- National Register of Historic Places listings in Oregon
- Listings in neighboring counties: Clackamas, Gilliam, Hood River, Jefferson, Klickitat, Marion, Sherman, Wheeler
- List of National Historic Landmarks in Oregon
- Historic preservation
- History of Oregon
- Lists of Oregon-related topics
