= Mosier (surname) =

Mosier is the surname of the following people

- Carli Mosier (born 1978), American voice actress and singer
- Charles Mosier (1941–2006), American Pentecostal bishop
- Chris Mosier, American transgender advocate, triathlete, and speaker
- Elizabeth Mosier, American author and professor
- Harold G. Mosier (1889–1971), U.S. Representative from Ohio
- John Mosier, American academic
- Scott Mosier (born 1971), Canadian American film producer, editor, podcaster, writer and actor
- Susan Mosier (born 1959), American legislator and politician
