= Edward F. Sharp Residential Ensemble =

Historic house in Oregon, United States

- U.S. National Register of Historic Places
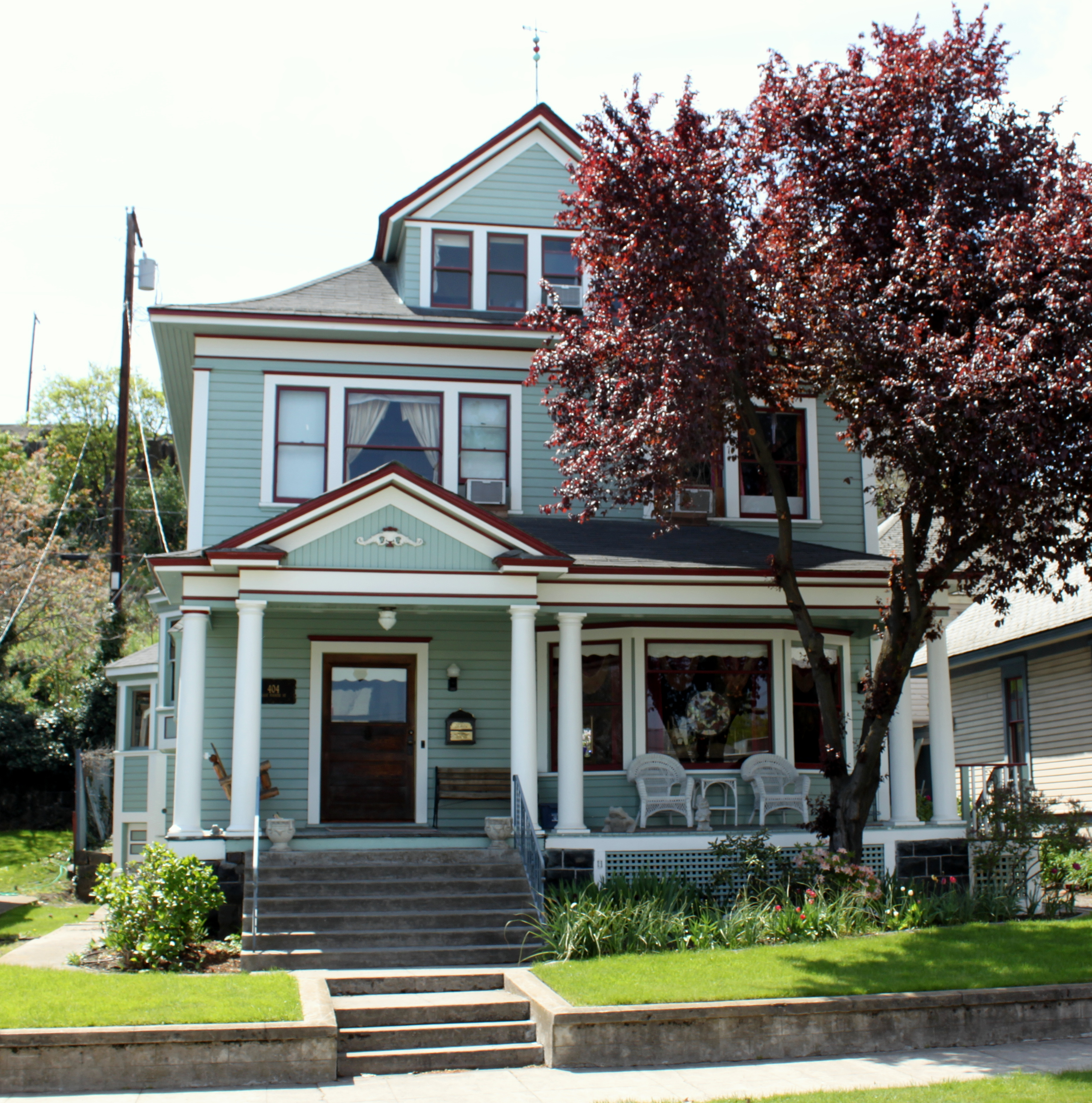
- The house at 404 E. 4th Street in 2009

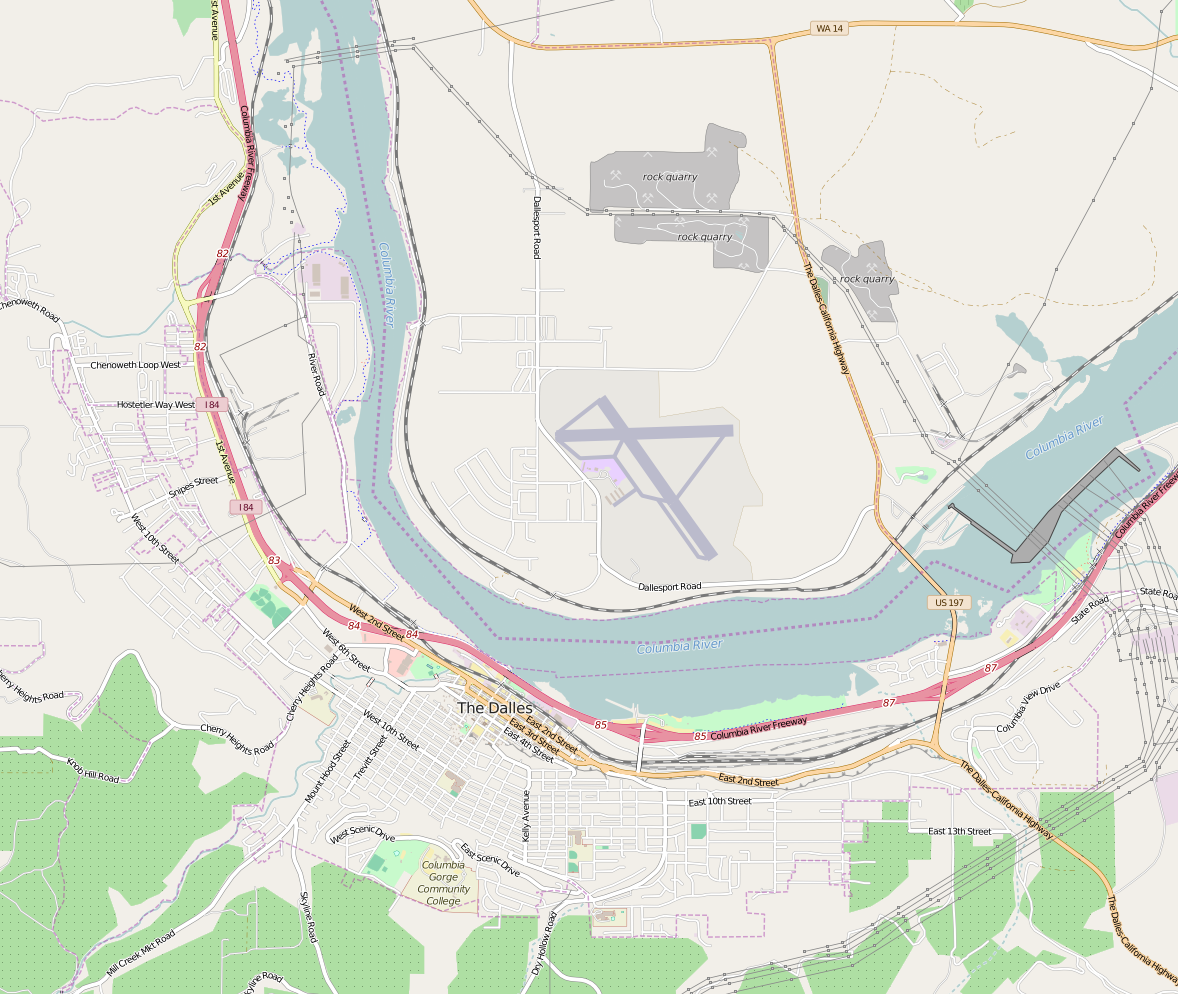
- Location within The Dalles OR
- Location: 400 E. 4th Street; 404 E. 4th Street; 504 Federal Street; The Dalles, Oregon
- Coordinates: 45°35′57″N 121°10′55″W
- Area: 0.23 acres (0.093 ha)
- Built: 1895–1905
- Architectural style: Queen Anne, Craftsman
- NRHP reference No.: 91001561
- Added to NRHP: October 25, 1991

The Edward F. Sharp Residential Ensemble, also known as the Sharp Family Residential Ensemble, is a set of three adjacent historic houses in The Dalles, Oregon, United States. Edward Sharp (1865–1954) was the county surveyor and roadmaster whose work underlies much of the development in The Dalles and Wasco County. As the official surveyor for the Eastern Oregon Land Company, he also conducted important early surveys across large stretches of Oregon and Idaho. He built the houses at 400 and 404 E. 4th Street for himself and his family (1895 and 1905, respectively), and the house at 504 Federal Street for employees (1900). Because the houses remained under common ownership in the Sharp family for many years, they have retained an exceptional level of preservation. The houses on 4th Street are also exceptional local examples of the Queen Anne (400) and Craftsman (404) styles.

The ensemble was added to the National Register of Historic Places in 1991.

== See also ==
- National Register of Historic Places listings in Wasco County, Oregon
