= Messenger College =

- Motto: Developing world changing Pentecostal leaders for the 21st century.
- Type: private
- Established: 1987
- Affiliations: Pentecostal Church of God
- President: James Rayburn
- Vice-president: Angela Heppner and Candace Rayburn
- Location: Bedford, Texas, United States; 32°49′52″N 97°06′01″W
- Campus: Urban
- Colors: Red, White, and Blue
- Nicknames: MC, Messenger
- Mascot: Eagles
- Website: Messenger College

Messenger College is a private Pentecostal college in Bedford, Texas. The institution is accredited through the Transnational Association of Christian Colleges and Schools (TRACS) and its students are eligible for federal student aid programs. Messenger College offers Bachelor of Arts and Associate of Arts degrees. Distance learning is offered through Messenger College On-Line.

== History ==
Joplin Era

In September 1987, Messenger College was created by the merging of two collegiate institutions. In November 1983, the Pentecostal Church of God, the sponsoring organization of the two denominational colleges in the United States, elected to merge those institutions into one college in Joplin, Missouri, the host city of its international headquarters. Southern Bible College in Houston, Texas and Evangelical Christian College in Fresno, California were closed and the resources moved to Joplin, Missouri to create Messenger College. Messenger College was opened in newly constructed facilities on 16 acres (65,000 m^{2}) of wooded property across from the international offices of the church denomination.

It is the Pentecostal Church of God's national collegiate institution, serving as the organization's educational arm for its ministers, missionaries, teachers, and other professionals to serve its constituency and others in the United States and abroad.

During the 2011 tornado that devastated the city of Joplin, Messenger College and The Pentecostal Church of God opened its doors to the people of Joplin for emergency relief, housing, and some day care services.

Dallas-Fort Worth Era

In 2012, Messenger College relocated its campus to Euless, Texas, in the Dallas-Fort Worth Metroplex. In 2018, Messenger College relocated again to Bedford, Texas still in the Dallas-Fort Worth Metroplex, united once again with the campus of the Pentecostal Church of God's International Missions Center.

== Academics ==
Major Programs

Messenger College offers two major programs, Christian Ministry and Christian Counseling.

In Christian Ministry there are seven different concentrations that can be applied to the degree: Student Ministry, Worship Ministry, Inter-Cultural Ministry, Pastoral Ministry, Biblical Studies, Discipleship Ministry, and Administration and Leadership. These concentrations allow for a deeper connection to the specific area of ministry a student is hoping to work in.

The Christian Ministry major program can be followed through a one-year certification, a two-year associates, or a four-year bachelor's degree. The Christian Counseling program can only be followed through a four-year bachelor's degree.

== See also ==
- Mizpa Pentecostal University: San Juan, Puerto Rico
- Southern Bible College: Houston, Texas
