= Southern Bible College =

Coordinates: 29°49′7″N 95°14′24″W

Southern Bible College was a coeducational Bible college in Houston, Texas.

The East Texas District of the Pentecostal Church of God wanted a regional educational facility in Greater Houston, so the facility opened in 1958. The facility received a permanent campus along Beaumont Highway in 1963. The college closed in May, 1984 due to financial reasons.

The Southern Bible College site now hosts the Ben A. Reid Community Corrections Center, a halfway house operated by GEO Group (originally operated by Cornell Corrections), which contracts with the Texas Department of Criminal Justice. As of 2004 the facility housed almost 400 parolees; 224 of them were subject to sex offender registration. Because of aspects of state law and because of a shortage of halfway houses, almost two thirds of the sex offenders were from outside of Harris County. Reid is the largest of the three Texas adult halfway houses that take sex offenders and out of county parolees, so Reid gets a significant number of paroled sex offenders.

== See also ==
- Messenger College: Bedford, Texas
- Mizpa Pentecostal University: San Juan, Puerto Rico
