= John and Murta Van Dellen House =

Historic house in Oregon, United States

- U.S. National Register of Historic Places
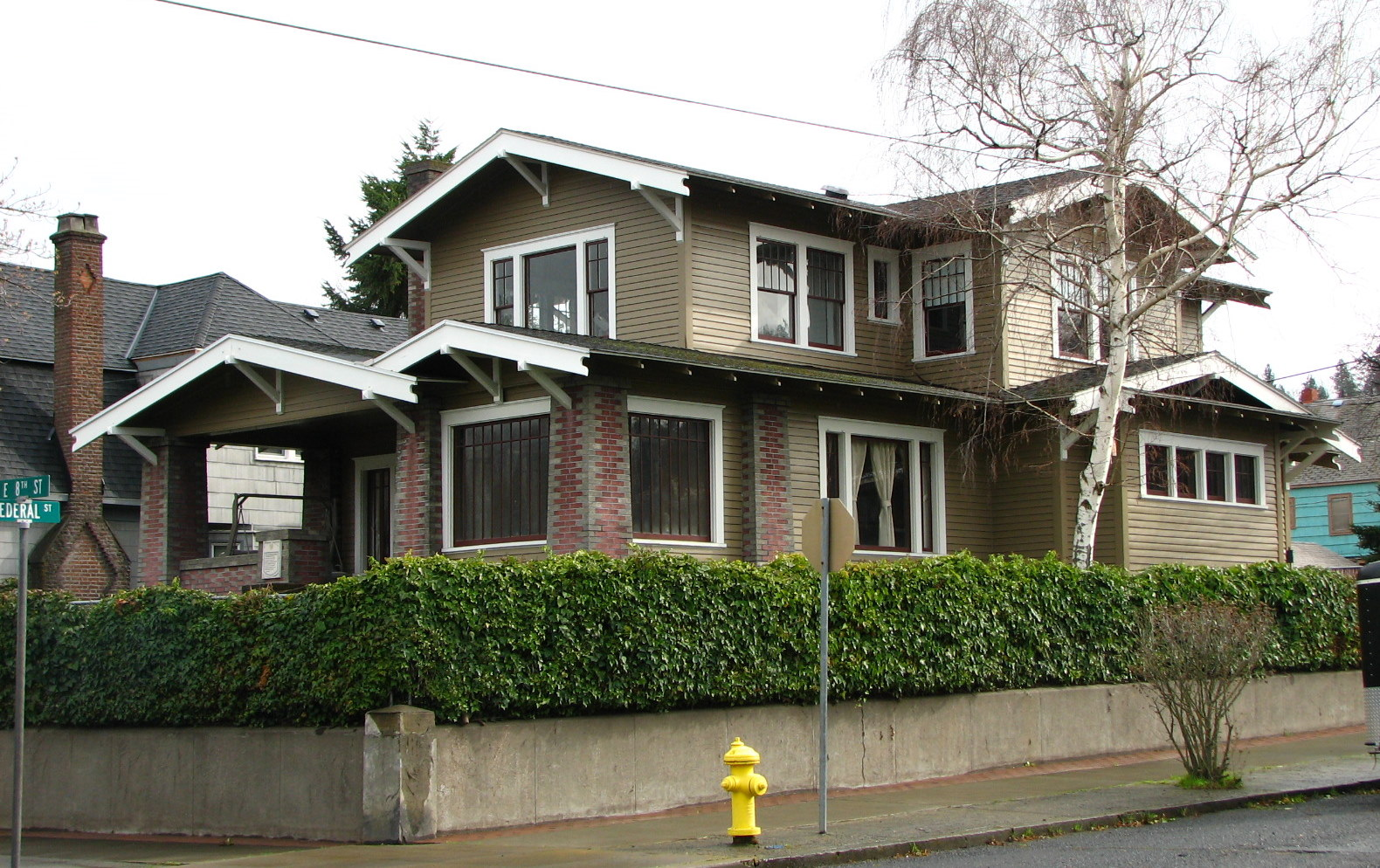
- The Van Dellen House in 2009

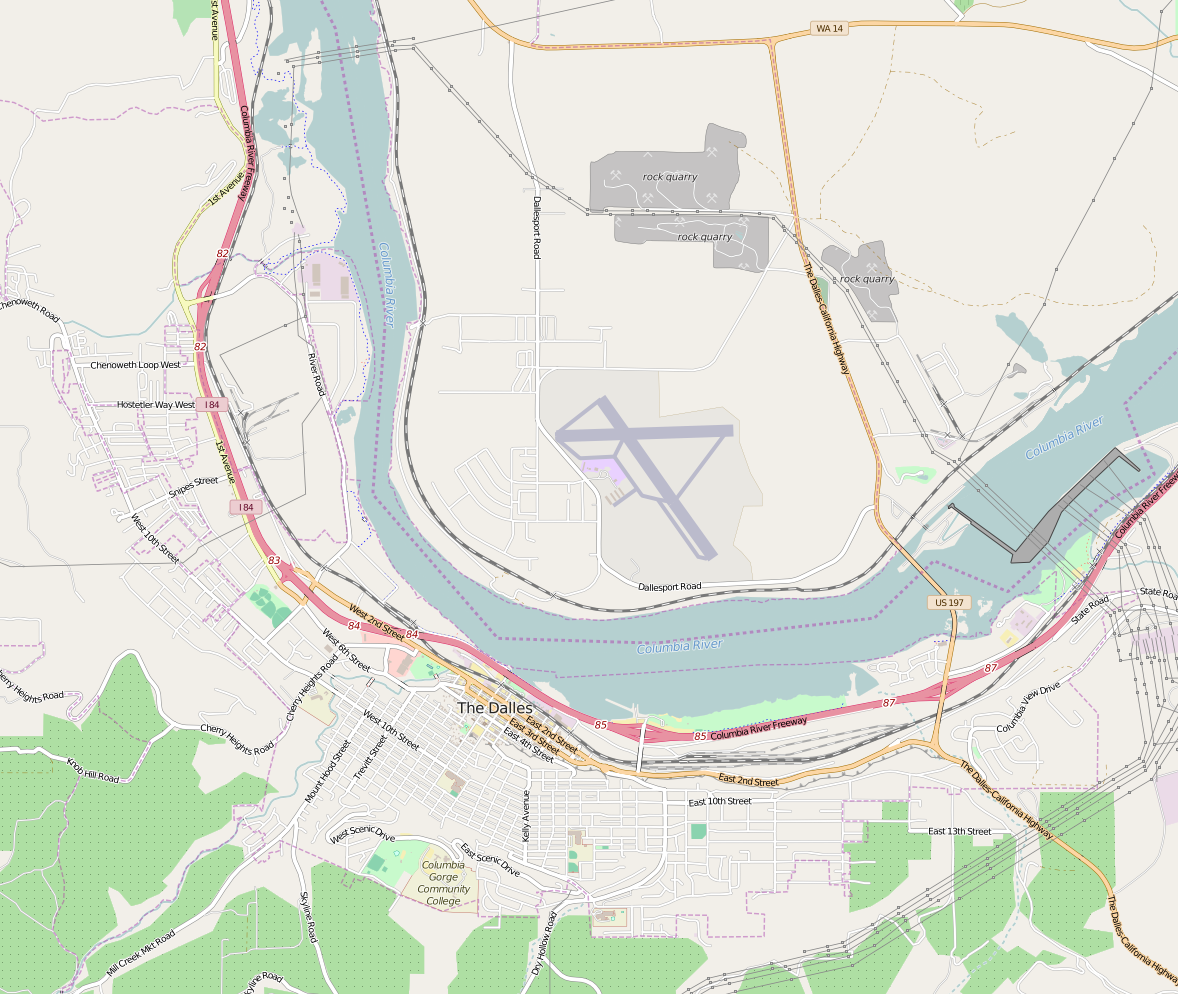
- Location within The Dalles OR
- Location: 400 E. 8th Street, The Dalles, Oregon
- Coordinates: 45°35′50″N 121°11′02″W
- Built: 1920
- Architectural style: California bungalow
- NRHP reference No.: 91000063
- Added to NRHP: February 20, 1991

The John and Murta Van Dellen House is a historic house located in The Dalles, Oregon, United States. Built in 1920, it is the outstanding example of a California bungalow in The Dalles. Original owner John Van Dellen was a prosperous lumber yard owner, and made use of the finest local building materials and craftsmanship in constructing his house.

The house was added to the National Register of Historic Places in 1991.

== See also ==
- National Register of Historic Places listings in Wasco County, Oregon
