= Fivemile Rapids Site =

- Fivemile Rapids Site (35 WS 4)
- U.S. National Register of Historic Places
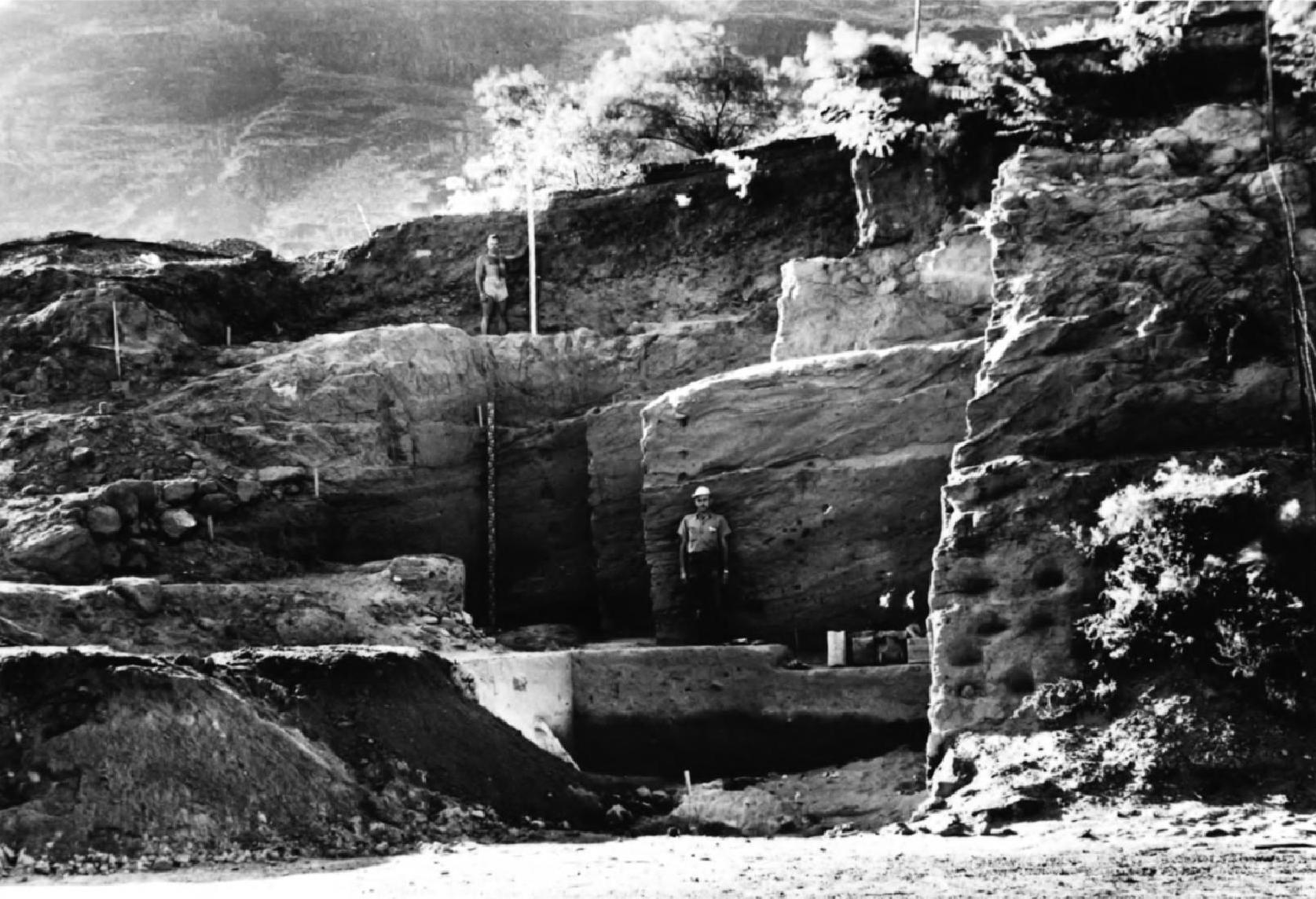
- Excavation at the Fivemile Rapids Site in 1955
- Location: Address restricted
- Nearest city: The Dalles, Oregon
- Area: 2 acres (0.81 ha)
- NRHP reference No.: 74001719
- Added to NRHP: December 19, 1974

The Fivemile Rapids Site (Smithsonian trinomial: 35 WS 4), is an archaeological site near The Dalles, Oregon, United States. Yielding remains beginning soon after the end of the last glacial period, this and other nearby sites provide a nearly continuous record of human occupation from at least 9000 BCE to 1820 CE. It also provides some of the earliest available evidence of fishing in human economy.

The site was added to the National Register of Historic Places in 1974.

== See also ==
- National Register of Historic Places listings in Wasco County, Oregon
