= Orlando Humason House =

Historic house in Oregon, United States

- U.S. National Register of Historic Places
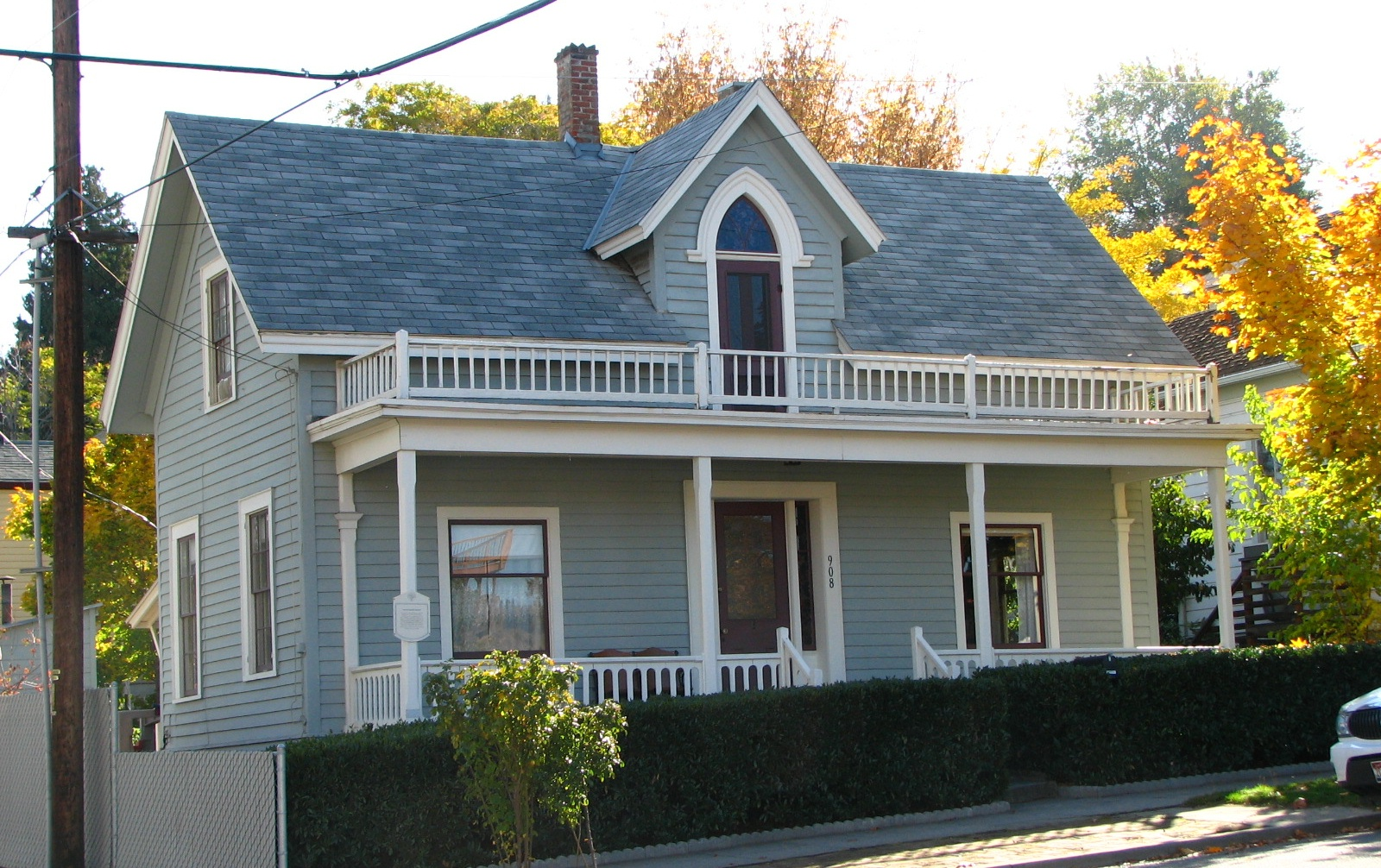
- The Humason House in 2008

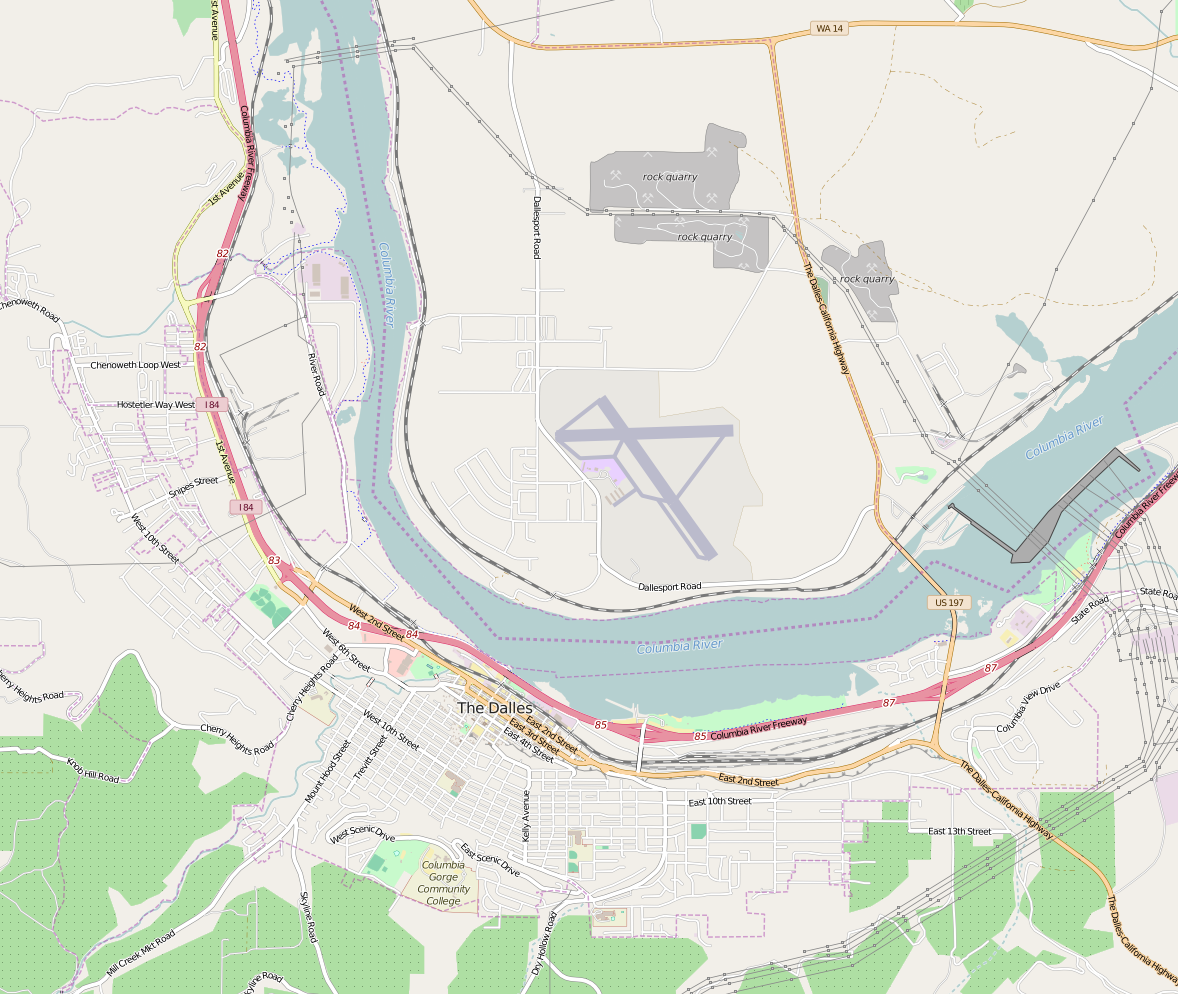
- Location within The Dalles OR
- Location: 908 Court Street; The Dalles, Oregon
- Coordinates: 45°35′51″N 121°11′13″W
- Area: 0.11 acres (0.045 ha)
- Built: 1860
- Architectural style: Gothic Revival
- NRHP reference No.: 91000809
- Added to NRHP: June 21, 1991

The Orlando Humason House is a historic house located in The Dalles, Oregon, United States. Humason (1828–1875), the "Father of Wasco County", lived in this modest Gothic Revival house from its construction in 1860 until his death. Originally from Ohio, he worked in law, prospecting, agriculture, and journalism, prior to settling in The Dalles as a prosperous merchant and river transport businessman. Representing first Oregon City then The Dalles in the territorial and state legislatures, he introduced legislation establishing Wasco County, Multnomah County, and the City of The Dalles. He also championed a bill to build a canal around the Cascades Rapids to allow Lower Columbia shipping to reach The Dalles, which did not come to fruition in his lifetime. Humason's other public positions included mayor of The Dalles and Wasco County judge. The house is architecturally notable as one of very few Gothic Revival houses in The Dalles.

At some date between 1875 and 1908, it was moved to its present location from elsewhere in The Dalles. It was entered on the National Register of Historic Places in 1991.

== See also ==
- National Register of Historic Places listings in Wasco County, Oregon
