= Mizpa Pentecostal University =

Theological university in San Juan, Puerto Rico

Coordinates: 18.35804°N 66.08493°W

Mizpa Pentecostal University (Universidad Pentecostal Mizpa) is a theological university located in San Juan, Puerto Rico, led and administrated by the Pentecostal Church of God, International Movement of Puerto Rico Region.

Founded in 1937 (88 years ago), Mizpa is the oldest Pentecostal theological school in Puerto Rico.

== History ==
In 1937, the Juan L. Lugo founded the Mizpa Bible Institute. The first Pentecostal missionary, Longo established the institute in barrio Santurce in the facilities of the Pentecostal Church of God, International Movement. On January 9, 1939, the first 12 students graduated. The Institute later moved to barrio Pajaros in Bayamon.

In 1956, Lugo move the institute to the barrio Caimito in Rio Piedras, its current location. . Currently the college community is represented by more than 13 denominations sisters.

In 1985, the Pentecostal Seminary of Puerto Rico (SEPRI) and Mizpa Bible Institute merged under the name of Mizpa Pentecostal College. The new college offered university-level education with associates and bachelor's degrees.

In February 2001, received the status "Initial Accreditation" from the Association for Biblical Higher Education (ABHE). In February 2006, the ABHE reaffirmed the accreditation of the College for the next ten years.

== Programs ==
=== Certificates ===
Mizpa offers certificate programs in 20 centers across the island

- Chaplaincy
- Christian education
- Ministerial erts

=== Associate degrees ===
- Christian education
- Christian counseling
- Pastoral theology
- Missiology

Mizpa offer courses in professional improvement to all pastors who are promoted by the Church of God Pentecostal, M. I. in Puerto Rico.

At the San Juan campus, students have the opportunity to receive Pell Grants and federal aid via Title IV program.

== Directors ==
- Rev. Fr. Juan L. Lugo,
- Reverend. Jose M, Martinez (3 times),
- Rev. Fr. Benigno Colon,
- Reverend. Luis C. Otero,
- Reverend. Ramon Muniz (2 times),
- Mis. Matilde Roman, Reverend.
- Juan Caban (2 times),
- Rev. Fr. Eleuterio Feliciano,
- Reverend. Esmeraldo Cruz,
- Reverend. David Ramos,
- Rev. Joseph O. Santos
- Dr. Sara Ramos Cartagena

== Presidents ==
- Dr. Ramón Muñiz
- Reverend. Reinaldo Arroyo
- Dr. Naomi Rose
- Rev. Luis R. Cruz
- Rev. Daniel Cruz Olivera (since May 2003)

== See also ==
- Messenger College: Bedford, Texas
- Southern Bible College: Houston, Texas
