= Pentecostal Church of God =

Pentecostal church

- PCG logo
- Classification: Protestant
- Orientation: Pentecostal
- Theology: Finished Work Pentecostal
- Associations: National Association of Evangelicals, Pentecostal/Charismatic Churches of North America
- Region: Worldwide
- Founder: John C. Sinclair
- Origin: 1919
- Congregations: 4,825
- Members: 620,000
- Official website: official Web Site

The Pentecostal Church of God (PCG) is a Finished Work Pentecostal denomination of Christianity headquartered in Bedford, Texas, United States. As of 2010, there were 620,000 members, 6,750 clergy in 4,825 churches worldwide.

The PCG is a member of the National Association of Evangelicals, the Pentecostal World Conference and the Pentecostal/Charismatic Churches of North America. The church's official publication is The Pentecostal Messenger.

== History ==
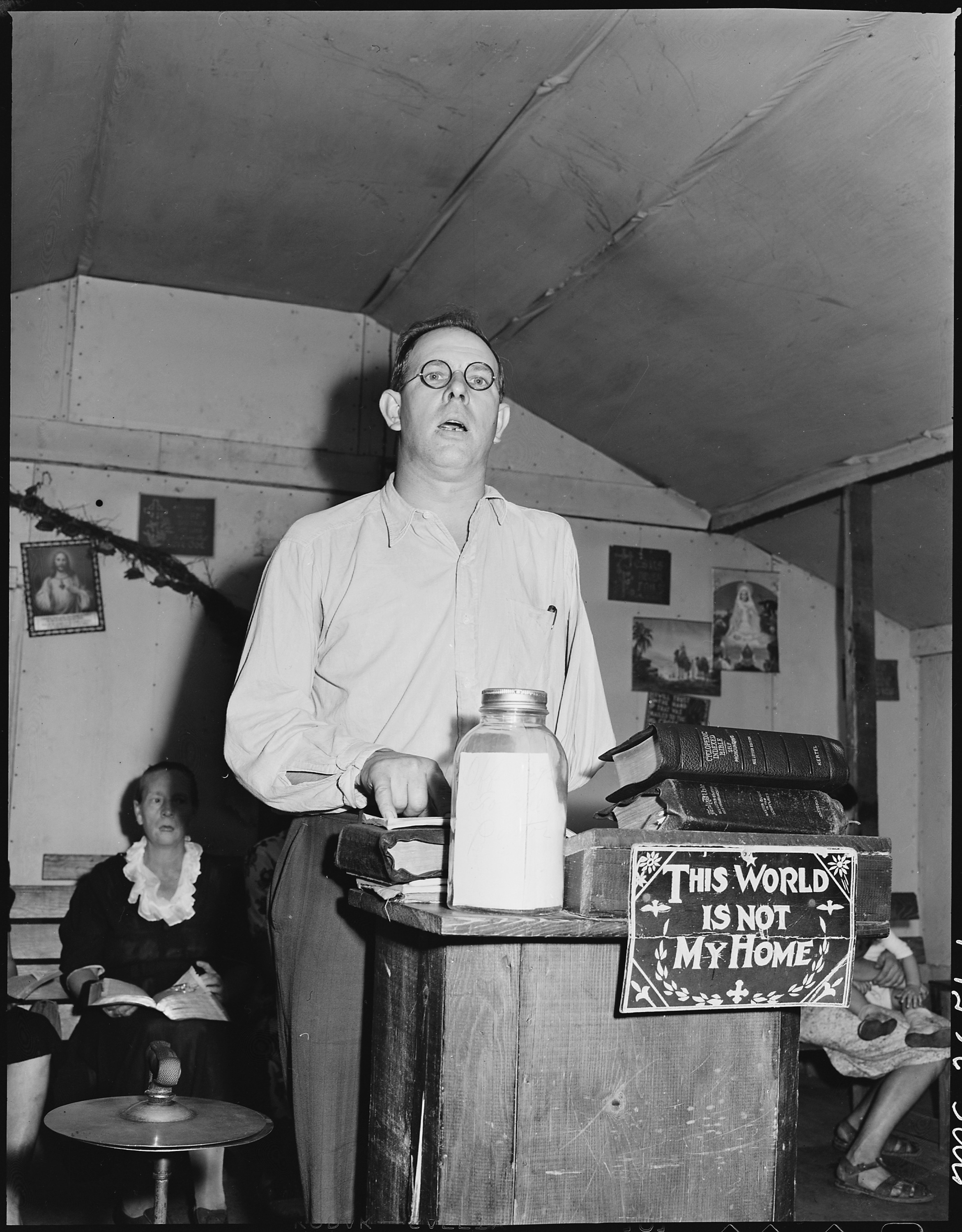
The pastor of a PCG church in Harlan County, Kentucky (1946)

First called the Pentecostal Assemblies of USA, the PCG was formed in Chicago, Illinois in 1919 by a group of Pentecostal ministers who had chosen not to affiliate with the Assemblies of God and several who had left that organization after it adopted a doctrinal statement in 1916. John C. Sinclair, an early Pentecostal pastor in Chicago, and a former Assemblies of God presbyter served as the first moderator. The Pentecostal Assemblies of the USA was dissolved in 1922, and the organization resumed under the name Pentecostal Church of God.

In 1927, the denominational headquarters relocated to Ottumwa, Iowa; in 1933, to Kansas City, Missouri; in 1951, to Joplin, Missouri in 1951; and in 2012, to Bedford, Texas.

Although the relocation to Bedford, TX followed the 2011 Joplin Tornado, the decision to move had started at least three years earlier when the 2009 General Convention voted to explore relocating to a larger metropolitan area. The reason for the move was because of lower income due to declining minister and church membership and Messenger College could no longer support itself.

== Beliefs ==
The Pentecostal Church of God combines Pentecostal and evangelical doctrines in its Statement of Faith.

- Both the Old and New Testament of the Bible is the inspired word of God.
- Believes there is one God that exists as a Trinity.
- Salvation is available through Jesus Christ's sacrifice on the cross.
- Salvation can be lost if one turns away from God by a human's free will.
- Believes in water baptism according to the Trinitarian formula.
- After salvation, a Christian can be baptized with the Holy Spirit, which is evidenced by speaking in tongues.
- Sanctification occurs progressively, that begins at the time of regeneration.
- Heaven and hell are literal places; heaven being for those who have received salvation, and hell for those who have rejected it.
- The Christian Church is made of all true Christians.
- There are two ordinances: water baptism and the Lord's supper. Water baptism symbolizes identification with Christ's death, burial, and resurrection. The Lord's supper is done in remembrance of Christ's death.
- Members practice tithing.
- Believes that Jesus Christ will return and that his return is imminent, personal, pretribulation, and premillennial.

== Organization ==
The church is led by a General Bishop (formerly called General Superintendent and before that General Moderator and General Chairman) and a General Convention which meets biennially. It is divided into a number of districts, including four Hispanic districts in the United States.

Each district is served by a district bishop, previously district superintendent. District conventions meet annually. In 2002, the General Convention came to a consensus to change the title of their overseer from General Superintendent to Bishop. The change was made because internationally, the term bishop is more commonly related to religious leaders than the previous title.

Prior to 2011, the International headquarters were located in Joplin, Missouri where a college and a publishing house operated. In 2012 The International Headquarters moved to Bedford, TX and the College, Messenger College, followed and is located in Euless, Texas. As of 2017, the International Headquarters has changed its name to the IMC, International Missions Center.

The Messenger College learning center was relocated to the fourth floor of the International Missions Center, and classes began in the new location at the start of the 2018-19 academic school year.

Moderator/Chairman
Rev. A. D. McClure: 1927-1933
Rev. G. F. C. Fons: 1933-1935

General Superintendent
Rev. Marion D. Townsend: 1935-1937
Rev. Harold M. Collins: 1937-1942
Rev. J. W. May: 1942-1947
Rev. H. T. Owens: 1947-1949
Rev. M. F. Coughran: 1949-1953
Rev. R. Dennis Heard: 1953-1975
Rev. Roy M. Chappell: 1975-1987
Dr. James D. Gee: 1987-2001

General Bishop
Rev. Phil L. Redding: 2001-2005
Rev. Charles R. Mosier: 2005–2006
Rev. Charles G. Scott: 2007–2015
Rev. Loyd L. Naten: 2015–2017
Dr. Wayman C. Ming: 2017–2025
Rev. Virgil Kincaid: 2025-current

== See also ==
- Messenger College: Bedford, Texas
- Mizpa Pentecostal University: San Juan, Puerto Rico
- Southern Bible College: Houston, Texas
