= Indian Shaker Church and Gulick Homestead =

Historic church in Oregon, United States

- U.S. National Register of Historic Places
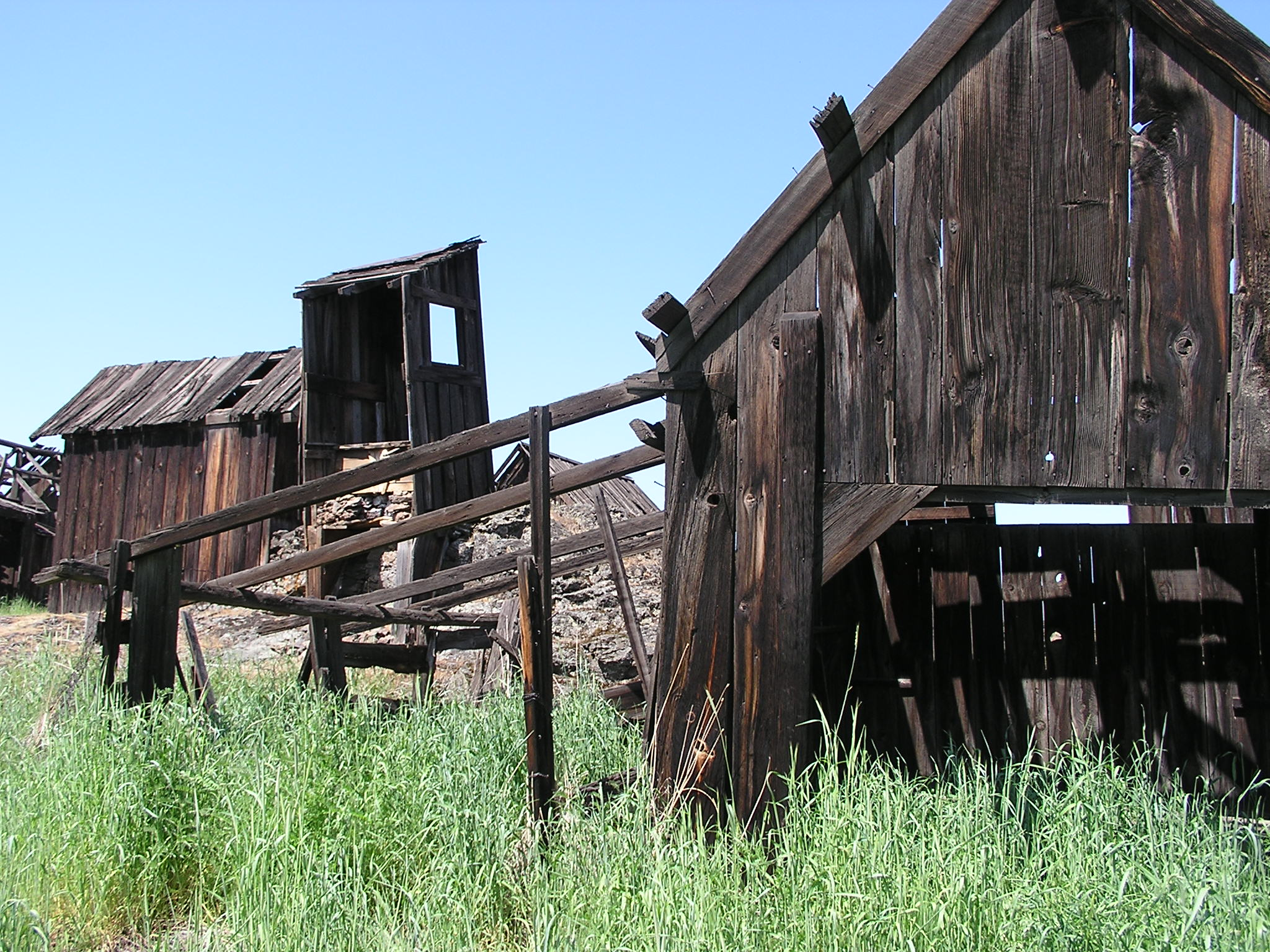
- Gulick Homestead buildings in 2004

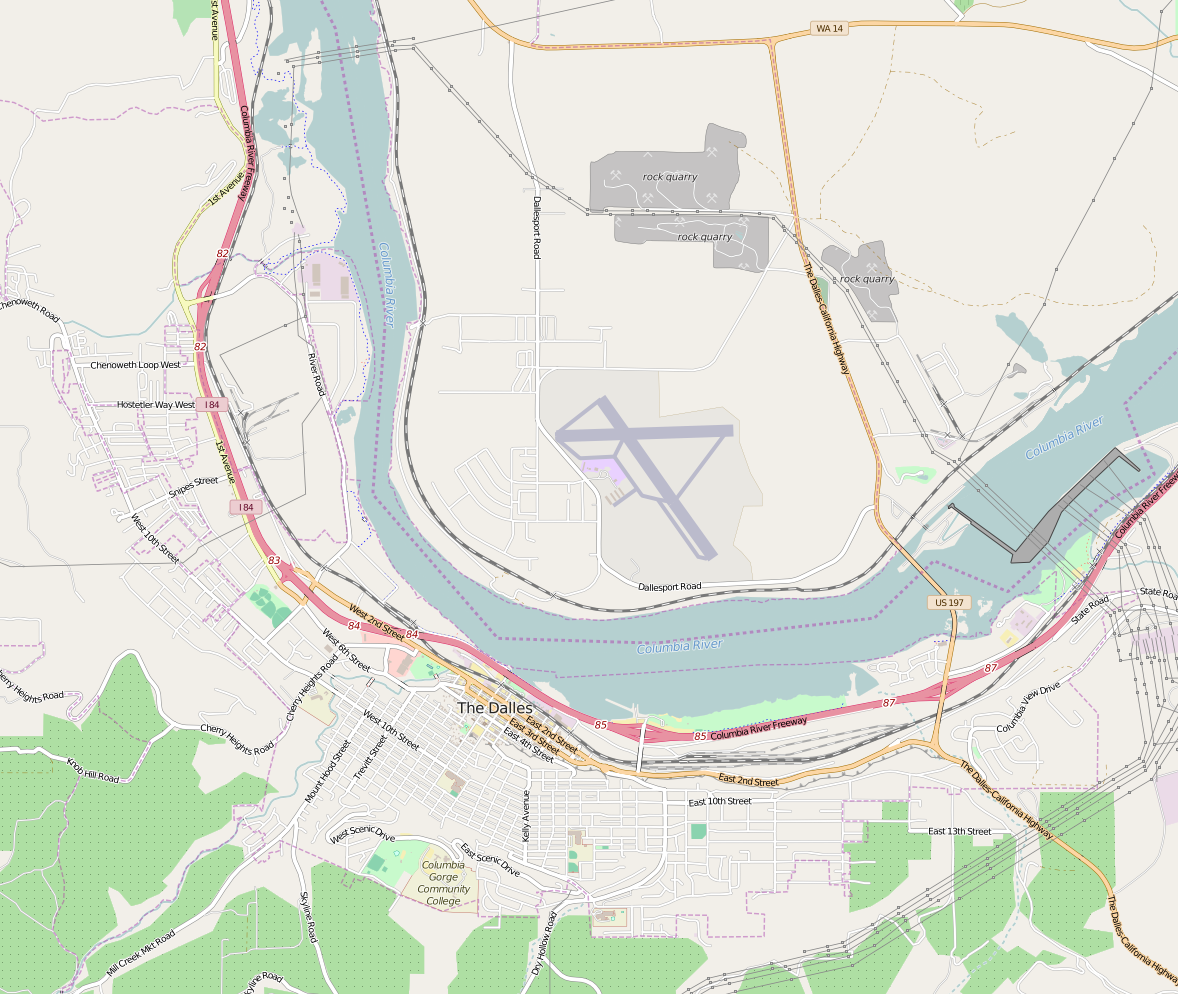
- Location within The Dalles OR
- Location: The Dalles, Oregon, near the junction of Interstate 84 and U.S. Route 197
- Coordinates: 45°36′21″N 121°08′08″W
- Area: 2.12 acres (0.86 ha)
- Built: 1891–1897
- Built by: Henry Gulick, et al.
- Architectural style: Vernacular
- NRHP reference No.: 78003087
- Added to NRHP: April 4, 1978

The Indian Shaker Church and Gulick Homestead are an ensemble of historic buildings in The Dalles, Oregon, United States. Built by Henry Gulick directly on the Columbia riverbank in the 1890s, it is the only remaining 19th century fishing homestead in Oregon. Gulick, an employee of the locally-important Seufert salmon canning concern, included a church building in the complex in ca. 1896 for his wife, Harriet, a member of the Wasco people. The church was the smallest of five Indian Shaker Church congregations in the state.

The church and homestead were added to the National Register of Historic Places in 1978.

== Bibliography ==
- Gary Reinoehl, Susan W. Horton: Preliminary Survey of the Gulick Homestead/Indian Shaker Church (Lone Pine Island Site), in: Northwest Anthropological Research Notes 11,2 (Fall 1977), pp. 146–157.

== See also ==
- National Register of Historic Places listings in Wasco County, Oregon
- Indian Shaker Church (Marysville, Washington)
