= Lewis Anderson House, Barn and Granary =

Historic house in Oregon, United States

- U.S. National Register of Historic Places
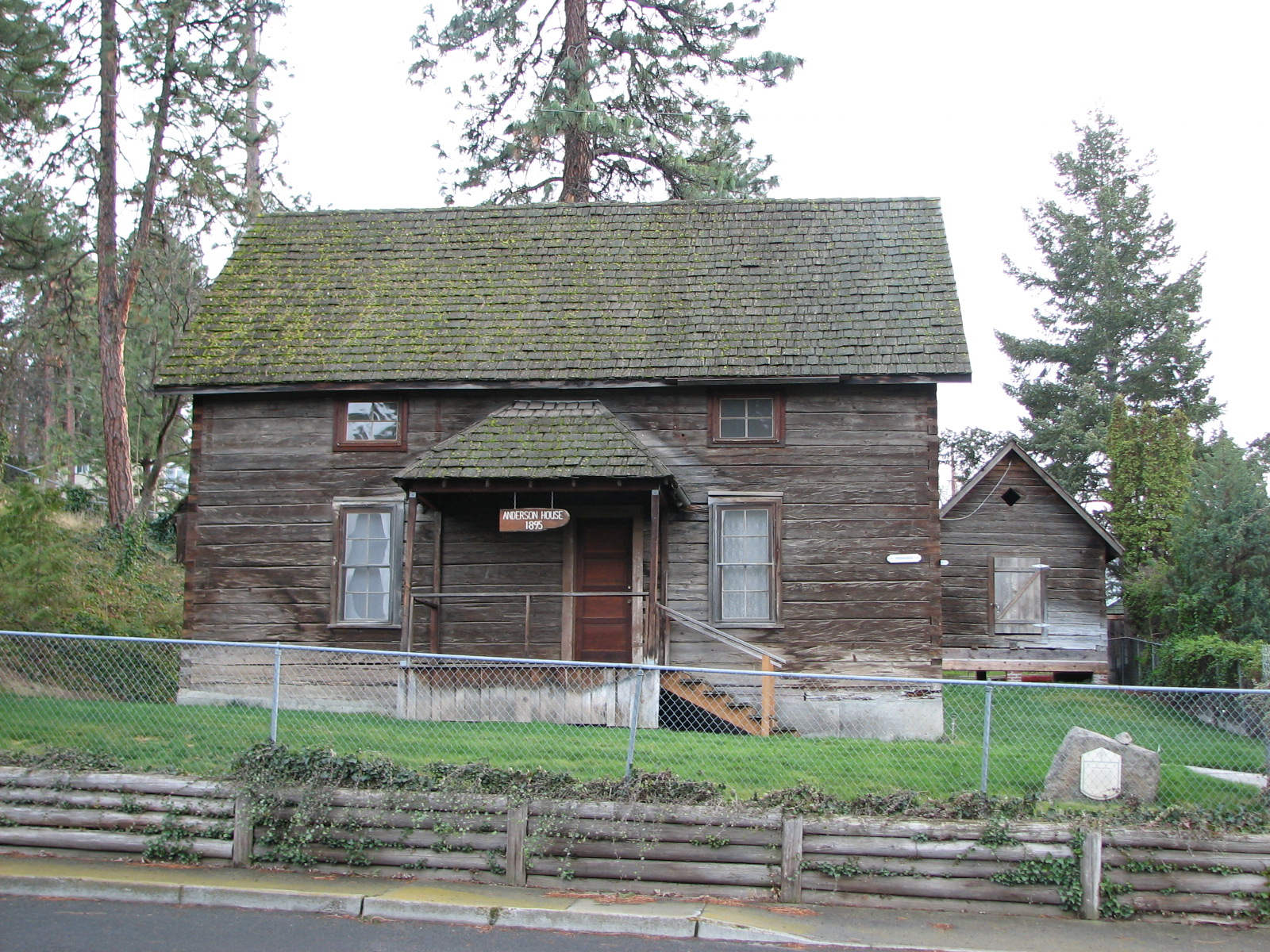
- View of the Anderson house and granary from 16th Street in 2008
- Location: 508 W. 16th Street; The Dalles, Oregon
- Coordinates: 45°35′44″N 121°11′52″W
- Area: 13,000 sq ft (1,200 m^{2})
- Built: 1890–1898
- Built by: Lewis Anderson, Ab Pearson
- Architectural style: Vernacular
- NRHP reference No.: 80003387
- Added to NRHP: March 20, 1980

The Lewis Anderson House, Barn and Granary is a historic ensemble of buildings, currently located in The Dalles, Oregon, United States. This well-preserved set of 1890s Swedish American vernacular architecture was originally located on a farm on Pleasant Ridge, south of The Dalles. Lewis Anderson was a Swedish immigrant who, after establishing himself on Pleasant Ridge, worked semi-successfully to encourage further Swedish settlement in the area of The Dalles. The sidehill barn, with grade entrances on two levels, was the first erected of the ensemble, in 1890. The house was built by Anderson and fellow Swedish immigrant Ab Pearson in 1895. Anderson purchased and relocated the granary from a neighboring farm in 1898, in the process repurposing it from its previous function as a house.

The buildings were relocated to The Dalles in 1972 in order to restore and protect them, and were made part of the Fort Dalles Museum at that time. They were entered onto the National Register of Historic Places in 1980.

== See also ==
- National Register of Historic Places listings in Wasco County, Oregon
