= Dr. J. A. Reuter House =

Historic house in Oregon, United States

- U.S. National Register of Historic Places
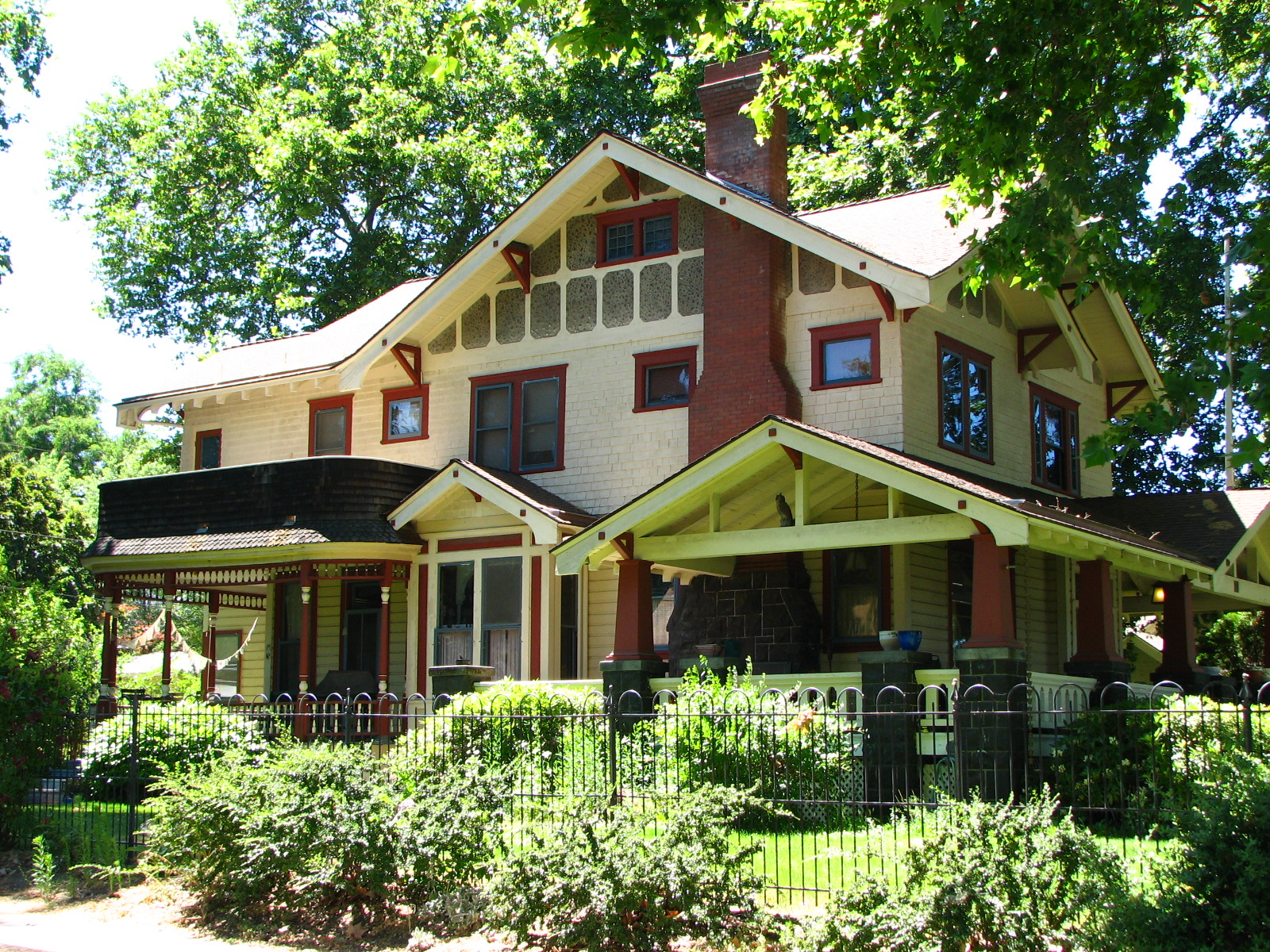
- The Reuter House in 2008

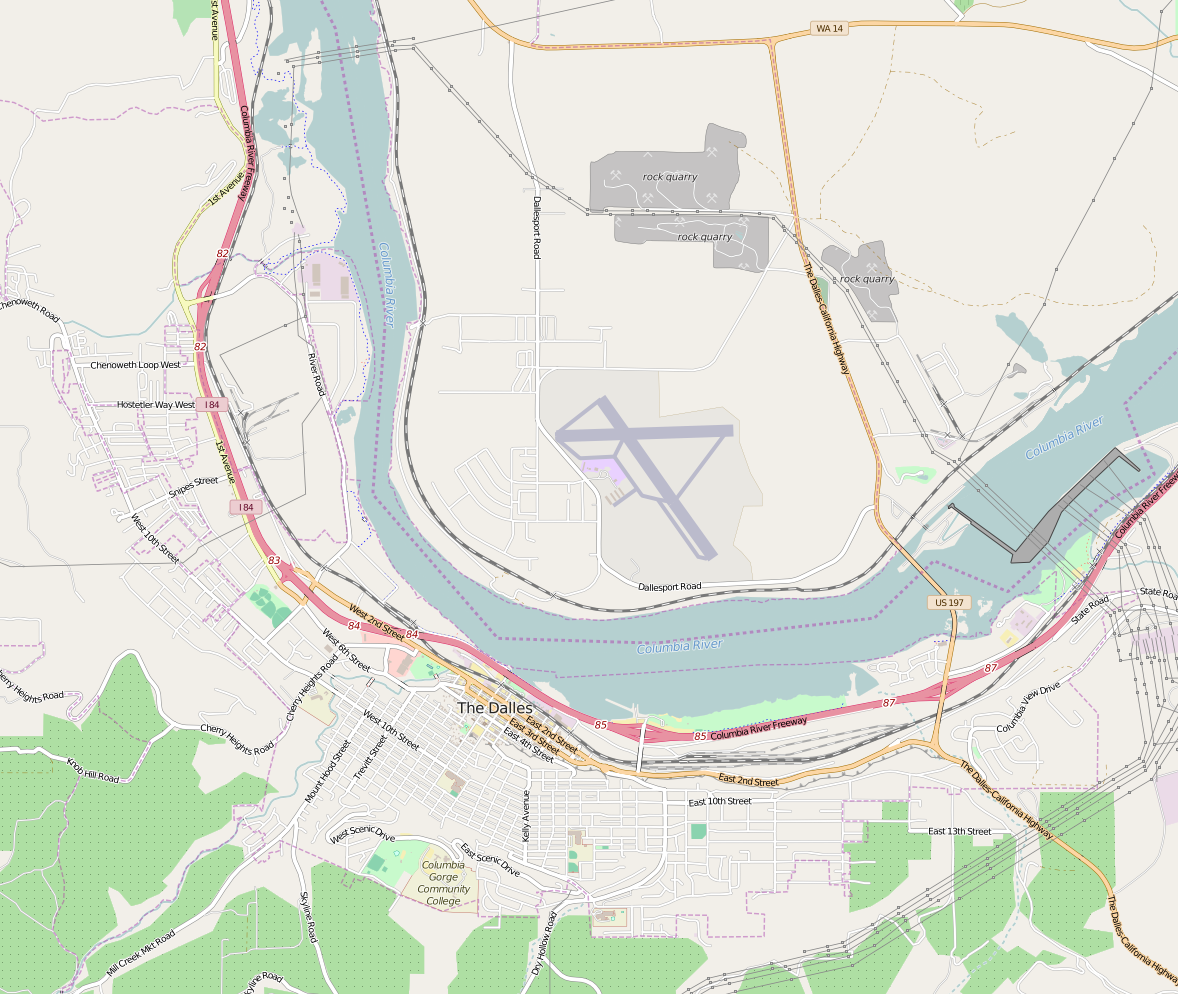
- Location within The Dalles OR
- Location: 420 E. 8th Street; The Dalles, Oregon
- Coordinates: 45°35′49″N 121°10′59″W
- Area: 0.38 acres (0.15 ha)
- Built: 1890, expanded 1909
- Built by: Richard Maxon (expansion)
- Architectural style: Craftsman
- NRHP reference No.: 97000578
- Added to NRHP: June 27, 1997

The Dr. J. A. Reuter House is a historic house in The Dalles, Oregon, United States. John Alexander Reuter (1876–1954) practiced medicine in The Dalles for 44 years (1902–1946), joining a partnership that established the city's first hospital (1901) and nursing school, as well as a large private clinic (1937). He bought this house (originally built 1890) in 1909 and radically transformed it by jacking the old house up to become the second floor and building a new first floor beneath. He also completely remodeled it to become the city's finest example of the Craftsman style.

The house was added to the National Register of Historic Places in 1997.

== See also ==
- National Register of Historic Places listings in Wasco County, Oregon
