= Heimrich–Seufert House =

Historic house in Oregon, United States

- U.S. National Register of Historic Places
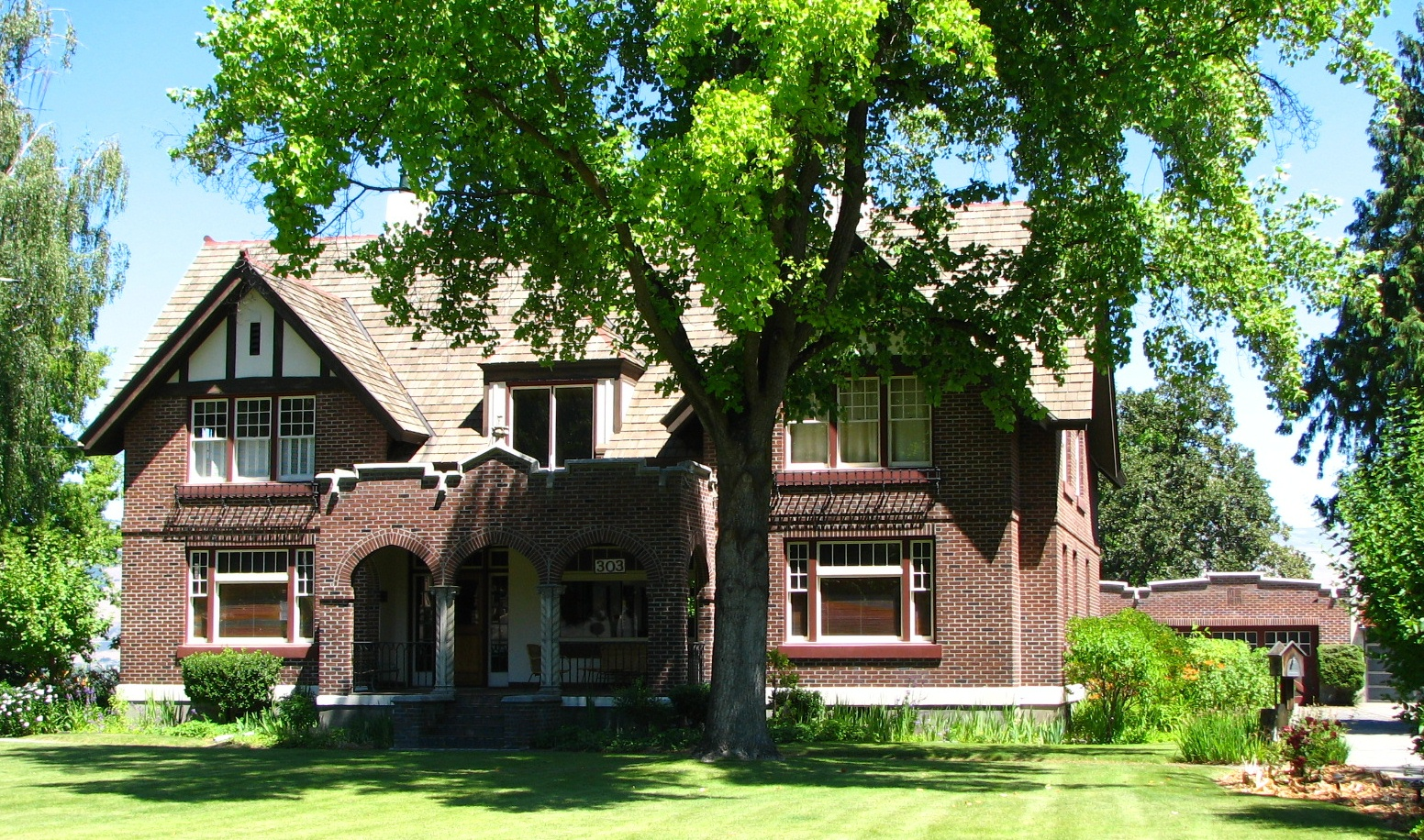
- The Heimrich–Seufert House in 2008

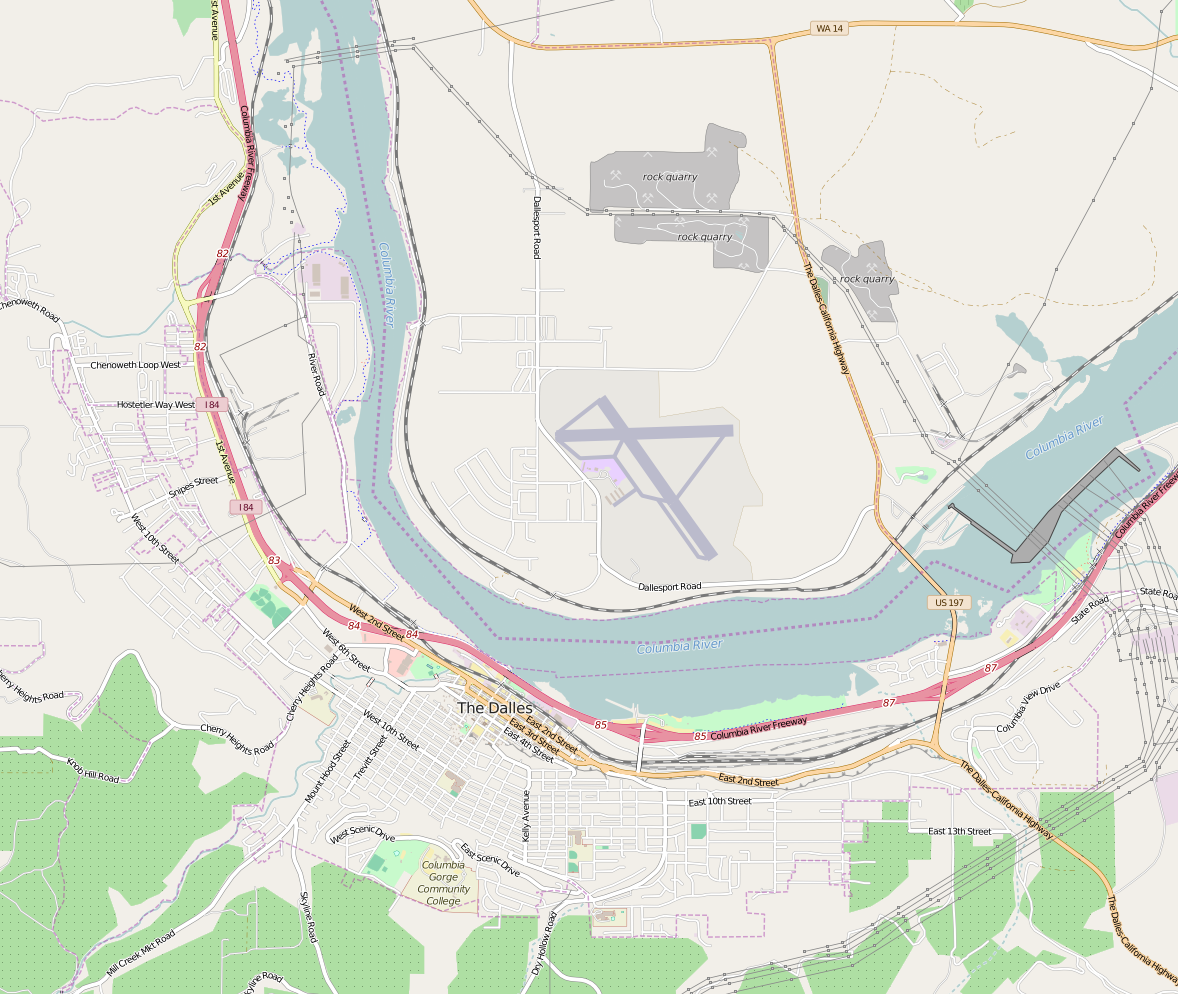
- Location within the United States Location within Oregon Location within The Dalles OR
- Location: 303 E. 10th Street; The Dalles, Oregon
- Coordinates: 45°35′48″N 121°11′10″W
- Area: 0.57 acres (0.23 ha)
- Built: 1927
- Architect: Barrett & Logan, Eugene C. Price
- Architectural style: Tudor Revival
- NRHP reference No.: 90000827
- Added to NRHP: June 1, 1990

The Heimrich–Seufert House (also known as the John G. Heimrich House or Edward Seufert House) is a historic house in The Dalles, Oregon, United States.

== Description and history ==
Built in 1927, the Tudor Revival style was home to two prominent figures in commerce and industry in The Dalles. John G. Heimrich (in residence 1927–1931) was a leader in the development of short line railroads in Oregon, whose career mirrored the decline of such railroads in the face of the internal combustion engine. Edward Seufert (in residence 1933–1966) managed a cannery that was founded in his family's interests in the Columbia River salmon fishery. The house's original designer Eugene C. Price was a self-trained but well-regarded architect of the Pacific Northwest during the late 19th and early 20th centuries. When Seufert acquired the house, he had it remodeled by the firm of Barrett & Logan, emphasizing Tudor Revival details. By the late 20th century, it was recognized as the finest Tudor house in the city.

The house was listed on the National Register of Historic Places on June 1, 1990.

== See also ==
- National Register of Historic Places listings in Wasco County, Oregon
- Seufert House, the Portland home of Edward Seufert's father Francis A. Seufert
