= Seufert House =

Historic house in Oregon, United States

- U.S. National Register of Historic Places
- U.S. Historic district – Contributing property
- Portland Historic Landmark
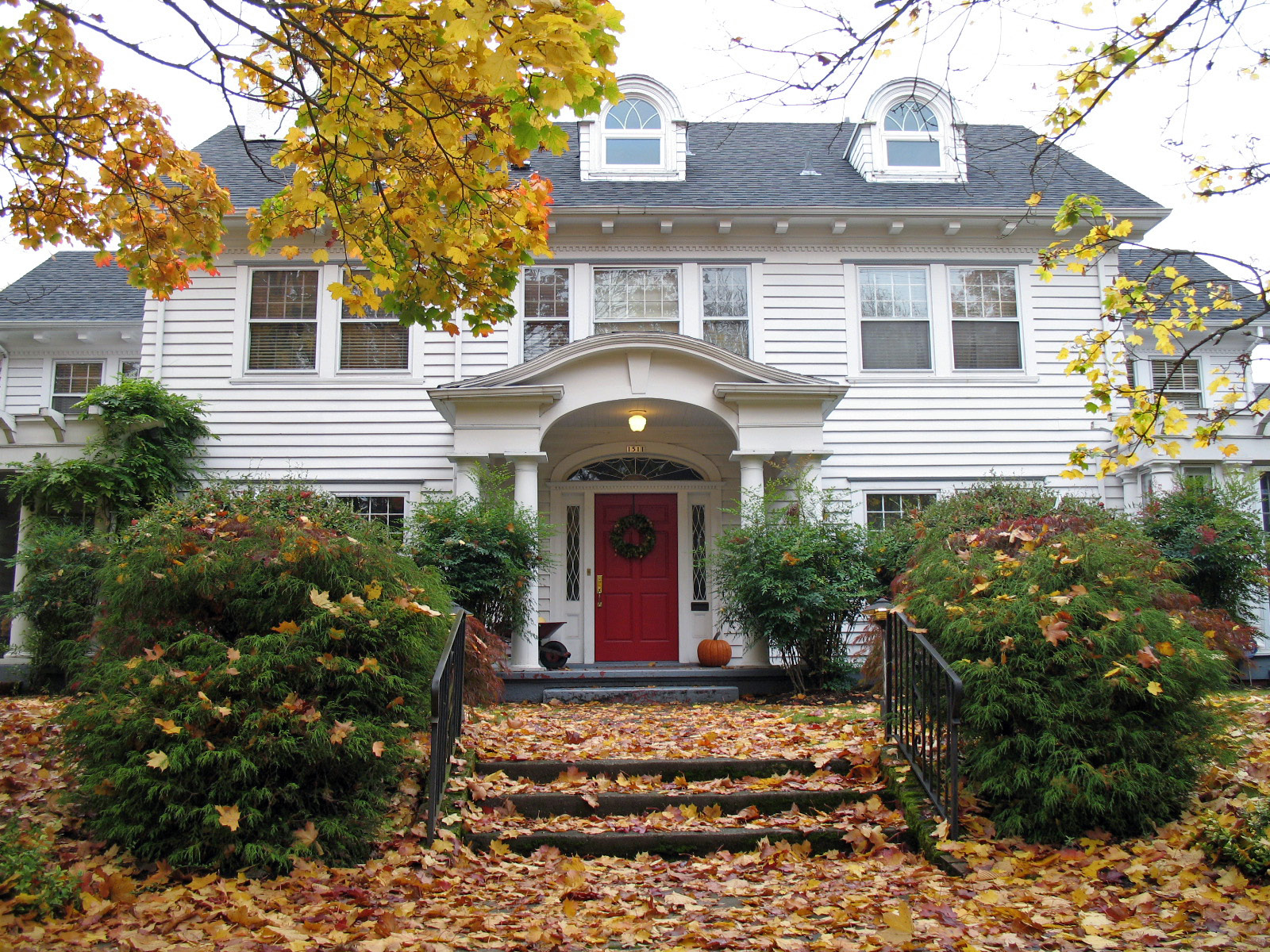
- The house in 2009

- Location within the United States Location within Oregon Location within Portland, Oregon
- Location: 1511 NE Knott Street; Portland, Oregon
- Coordinates: 45°32′32″N 122°39′00″W
- Built: 1913
- Built by: Mautz Building and Investment Company
- Architectural style: Colonial Revival
- Part of: Irvington Historic District (ID10000850)
- NRHP reference No.: 06000944
- Added to NRHP: October 10, 2006

The Seufert House, also known as the Mautz–Seufert House, is a historic residence in Portland, Oregon, United States. From 1914 to 1929, it was the Portland home of fishing and canning businessman Francis A. Seufert (1853–1929), who was an innovative leader in the upper Columbia River salmon industry at The Dalles. He pioneered use of the fish wheel to harvest fish, as well as the shipment of fresh, iced salmon to eastern markets. The house, built in 1913 in the Colonial Revival style, was the product of the Mautz Building and Investment Company, which built over fifty homes in the exclusive Irvington neighborhood. It was briefly occupied by Edmund J. Mautz prior to its sale to Francis Seufert.

The house was entered on the National Register of Historic Places in 2006.

== See also ==
- National Register of Historic Places listings in Northeast Portland, Oregon
- Heimrich–Seufert House, the home of Francis A. Seufert's son Edward J. Seufert in The Dalles
