= Rorick House Museum =

Historic house in Oregon, United States

- Malcolm A. Moody House
- U.S. National Register of Historic Places
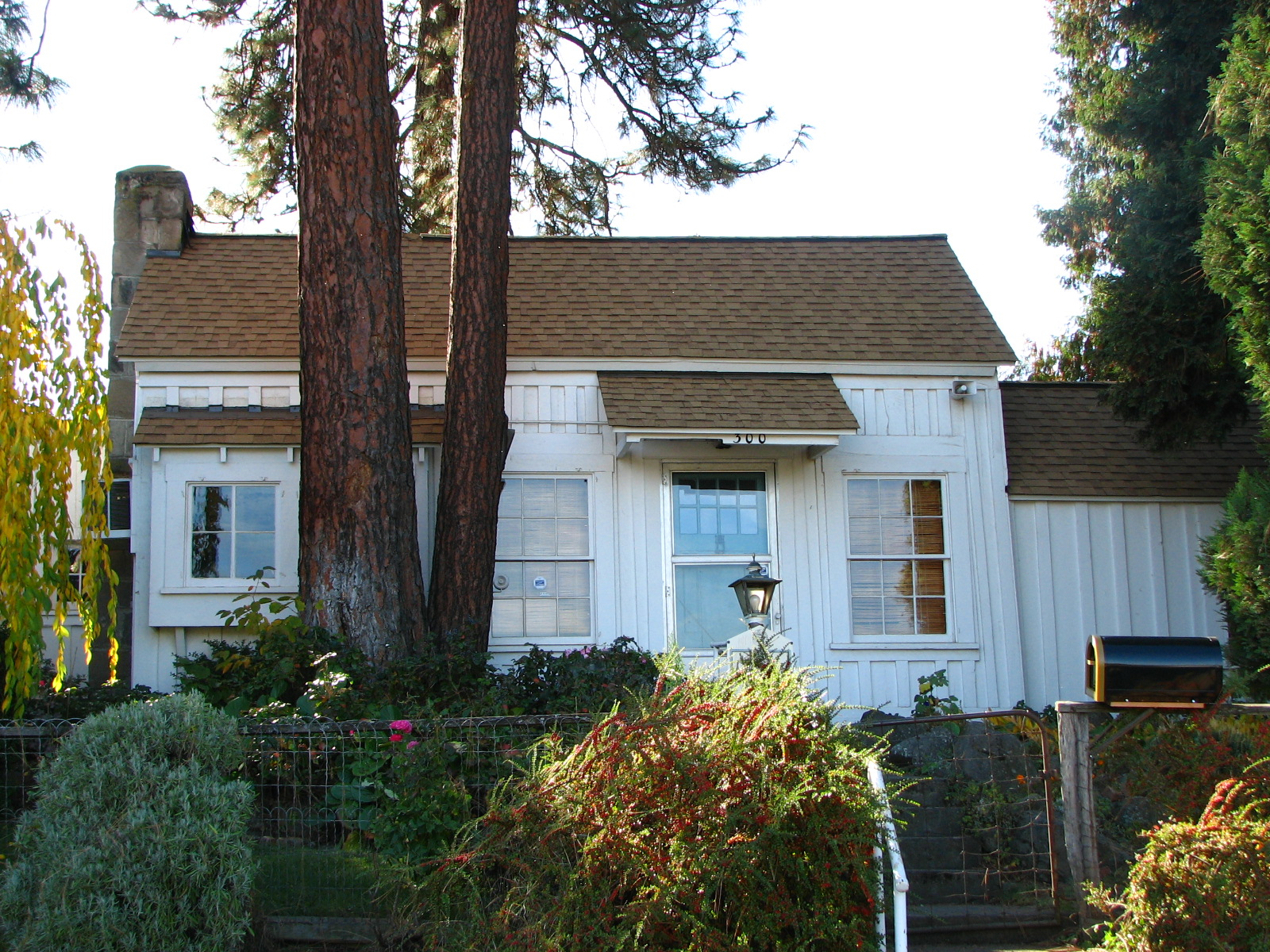
- The Moody House/Rorick House in 2008

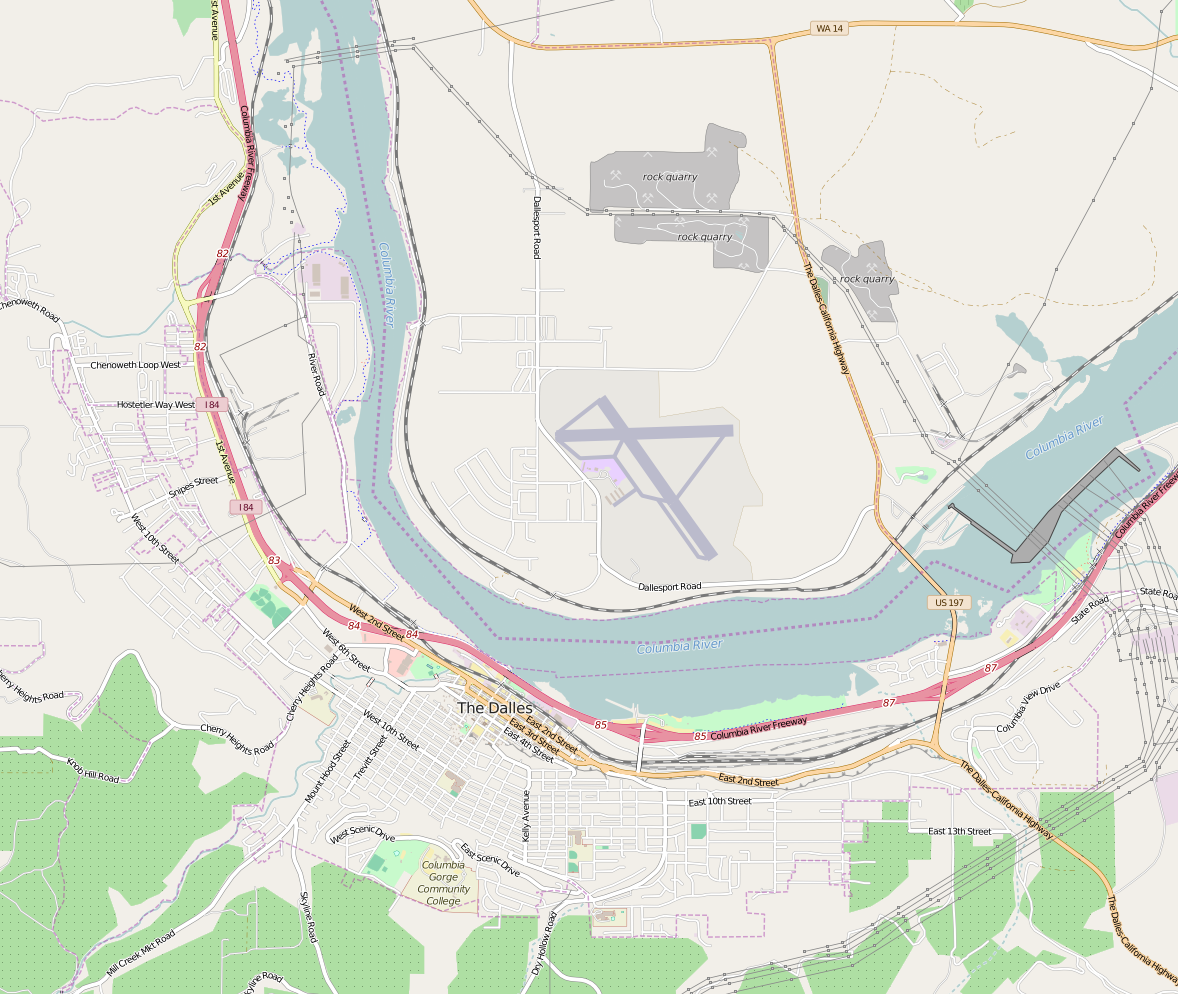
- Location within The Dalles OR
- Location: 300 W. 13th Street; The Dalles, Oregon
- Coordinates: 45°35′47″N 121°11′37″W
- Area: 0.3 acres (0.12 ha)
- Built: 1150; 876 years ago
- Architectural style: box construction
- NRHP reference No.: 80003388
- Added to NRHP: October 10, 1980

The Rorick House Museum, also known as the Malcolm A. Moody House, is a museum located in The Dalles, Oregon, United States. The building was originally built in 1850 as a two-room residence for non-commissioned officers from Fort Dalles, this is the oldest remaining house in The Dalles. It was subsequently occupied by U.S. Representative Malcolm A. Moody, and has ultimately become a museum. The house is the current headquarters for the Wasco County Historical Society.

== See also ==
- National Register of Historic Places listings in Wasco County, Oregon
