= Indian Shaker Church (Marysville, Washington) =

Historic church in Washington, United States

- U.S. National Register of Historic Places
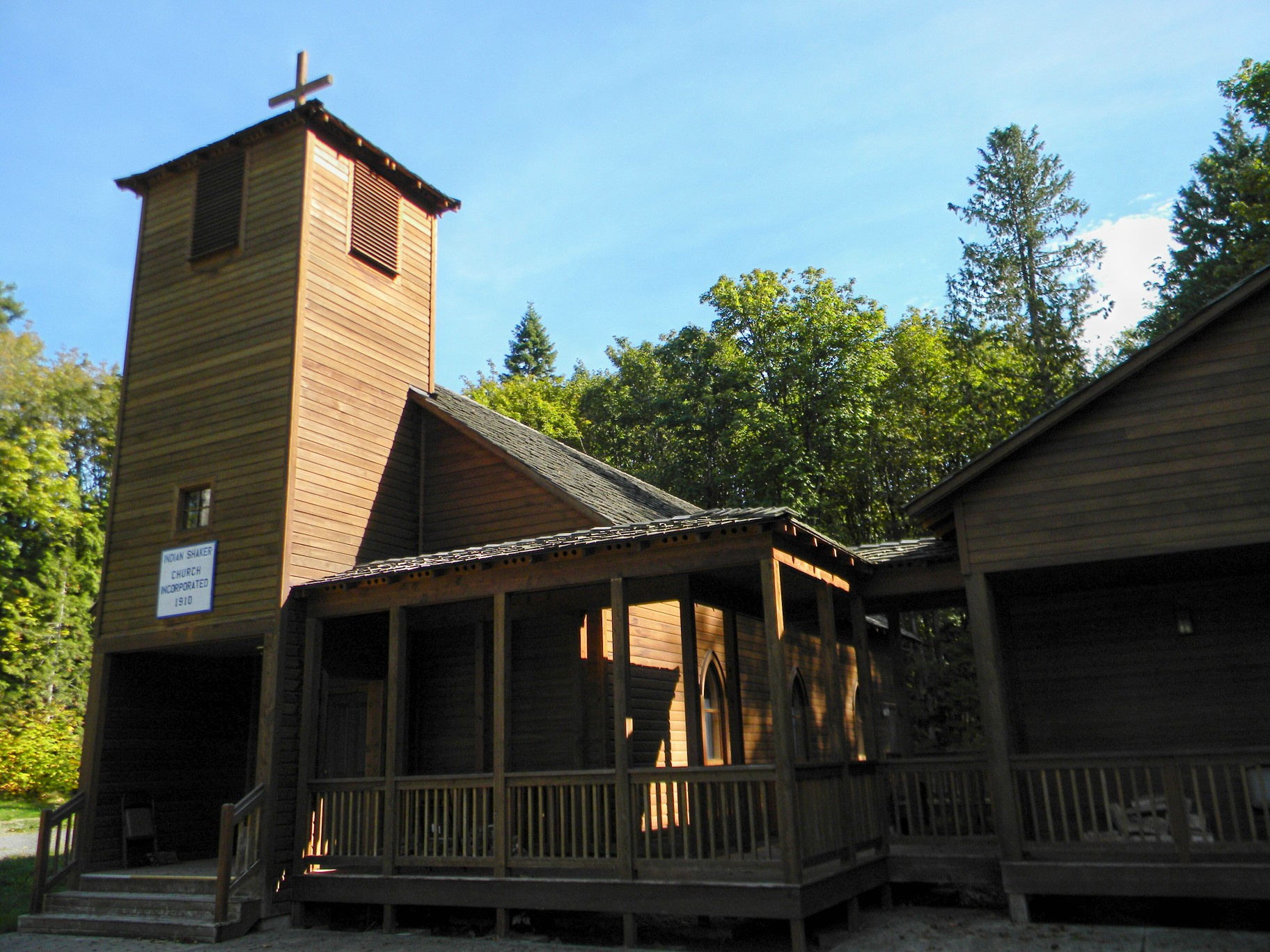
- Church building in 2013

- Location within Washington (state) Location within the United States
- Location: North Meridian Ave. west of Marysville, Washington
- Coordinates: 48°2′32″N 122°13′52″W
- Built: 1924
- Architectural style: Indian Shaker
- NRHP reference No.: 76001910
- Added to NRHP: 4 May 1976

Indian Shaker Church is a historic church property in Tulalip, Washington.

The church was built in 1924 by members of the Indian Shaker Church according to sect doctrine. It was added to the National Register of Historic Places on May 4, 1976.

== See also ==
- Historic preservation
- National Register of Historic Places listings in Snohomish County, Washington
- Indian Shaker Church and Gulick Homestead
