= Fulton–Taylor House =

Historic house in Oregon, United States

- U.S. National Register of Historic Places
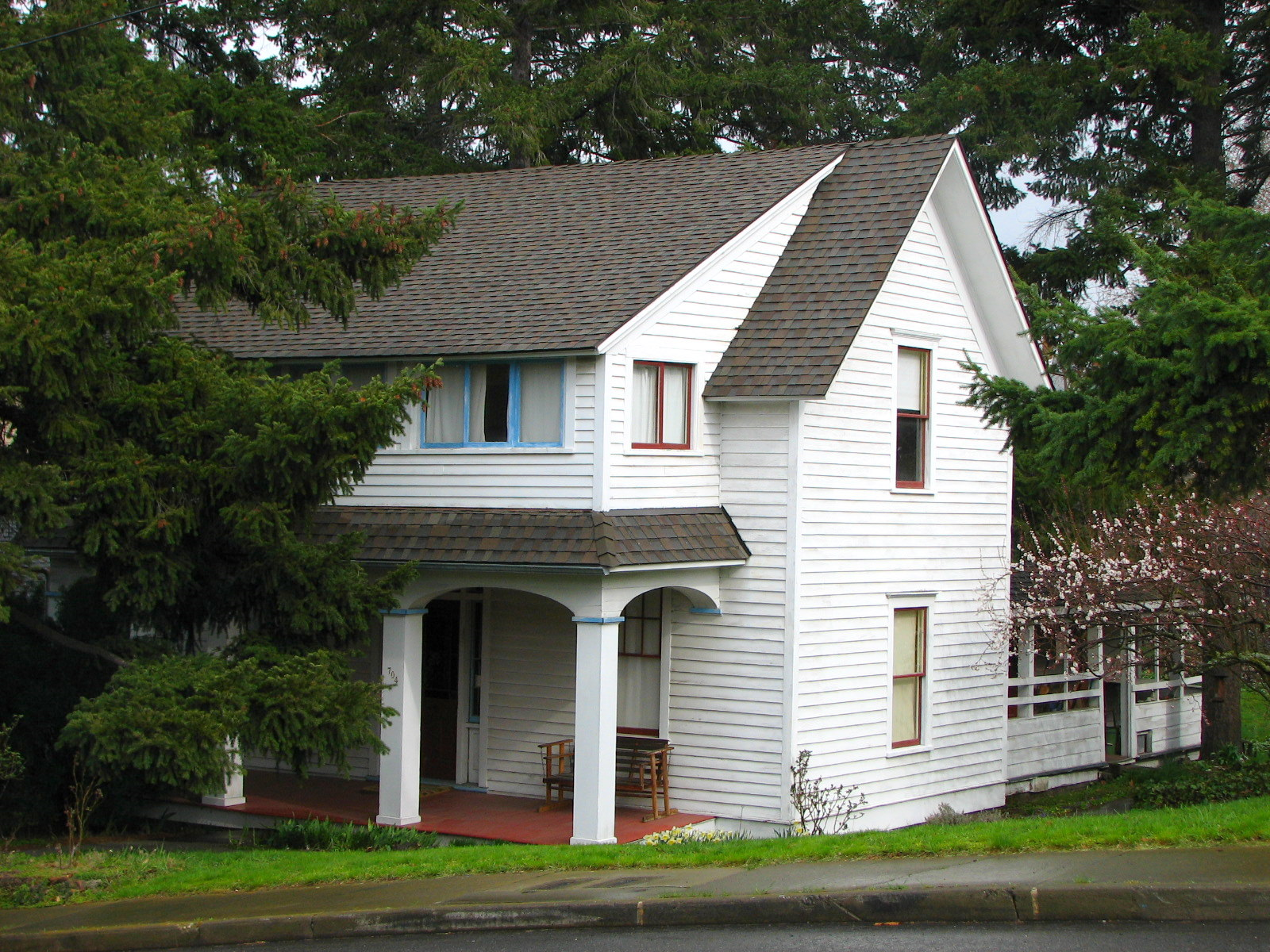
- The Fulton–Taylor House in 2009

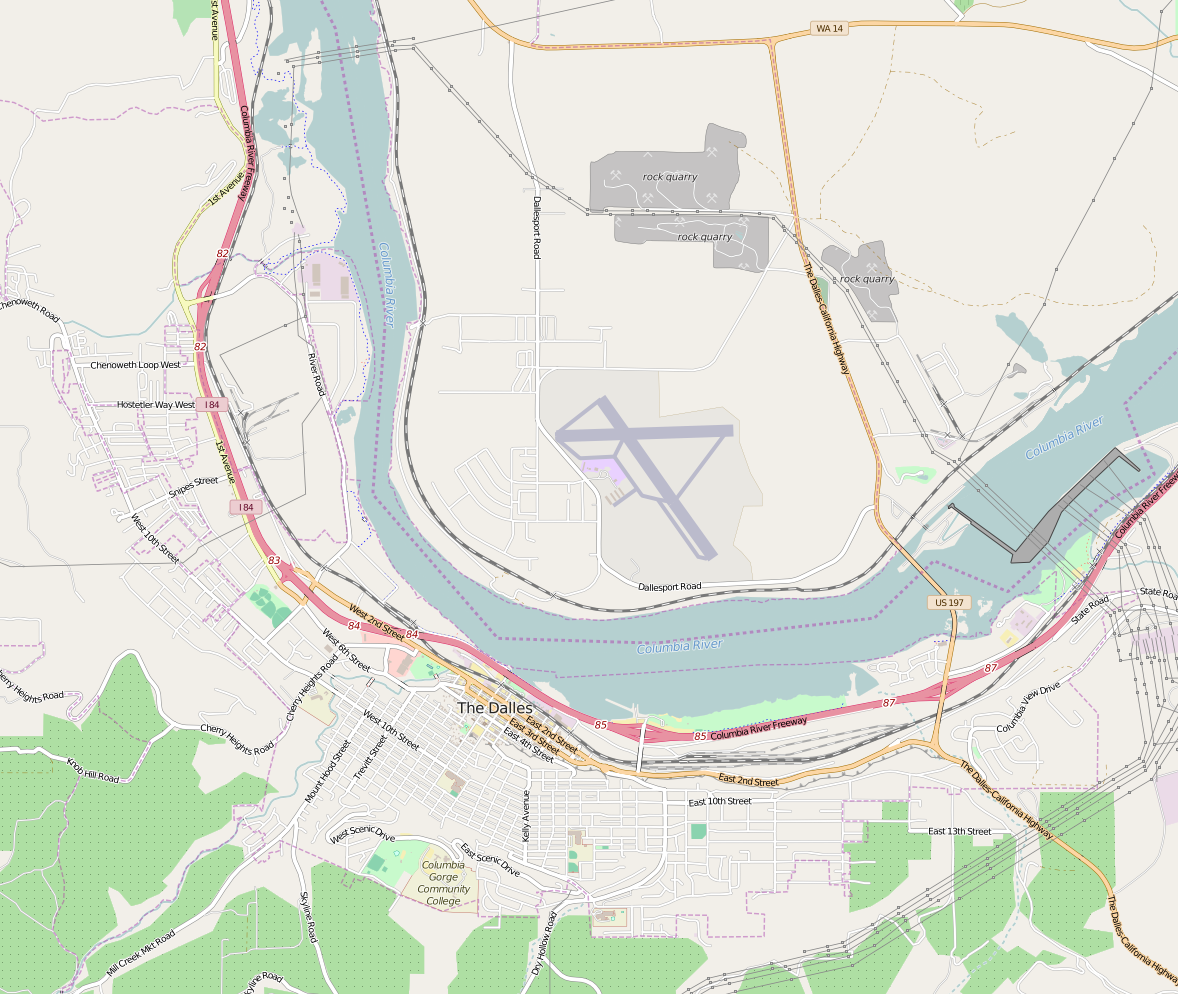
- Location within The Dalles OR
- Location: 704 Case Street; The Dalles, Oregon
- Coordinates: 45°35′52″N 121°11′02″W
- Built: c. 1858
- Architectural style: Gothic Revival
- NRHP reference No.: 93000920
- Added to NRHP: September 9, 1993

The Fulton–Taylor House was a historic house located in The Dalles, Oregon, United States. Built and modified in phases between circa 1858 and circa 1930, this house was only one of a few remaining houses of similar age and style in The Dalles. James Fulton (in residence 1864 – 1881) emigrated to Oregon on the Oregon Trail, and eventually established himself as a cattle rancher, leader of the settler militia, and a state legislator. The Rev. O.D. Taylor (in residence 1891 – 1897) was a Baptist minister, but was far more noted as the driving force behind a major, failed, but long-running real estate scheme that was widely regarded as fraudulent. The house was destroyed by a human-caused wildfire in June 2025.

The house was listed on the National Register of Historic Places.

== See also ==
- National Register of Historic Places listings in Wasco County, Oregon
