= Charles Mosier =

American bishop (1941–2006)

Charles Mosier (March 23, 1941 – July 28, 2006) was the General Bishop of the Pentecostal Church of God based in Joplin, Missouri, from 2005 until his death of cancer in 2006.

== Early life ==
Bishop Mosier was born in Campbell, Missouri, to John V. and Kathleen Mosier. He was a graduate of Chelsea High School, Chelsea, Michigan, and he received his Associate of Arts from Evangelical Christian College and an Honorary Doctorate from School of Bible Theology.

On April 1, 1961, he married Barbara Ann White. He is survived by two daughters, Deborah Ann Brannon and husband Michael of Flint, Michigan, Patricia Ann Kilbreath and husband Timothy of Burton, Michigan; three brothers, Clyde E. of Williamsville, Missouri, Ronald D. of Kansas City, Missouri, and Gary W. of Tulsa, Oklahoma.

== Duties ==
Since 1961, Mosier has served in various capacities in the Pentecostal Church of God. He began his full-time ministry in 1961 as the pastor of Bethel Tabernacle in Jackson, Michigan. He also pastored Jackson Avenue Pentecostal Church of God in Ann Arbor, Michigan. After serving in various District positions, he pastored Glad Tidings Tabernacle of Flint, Michigan. During his forty-five years of ministry, he served the Pentecostal Church of God in the following capacities: 5 years as Michigan District PYPA (Pentecostal Young People's Association) President, 9 years as Michigan District Secretary/Treasurer, 7 ½ years as Michigan District Superintendent, 14 years as Assistant General Superintendent, 10 years as World Missions Director, 38 years as a Member of the Pentecostal Church of God General Board, and 11 months as General Bishop.
