= Jefferson Mosier House =

Historic house in Oregon, United States

- U.S. National Register of Historic Places
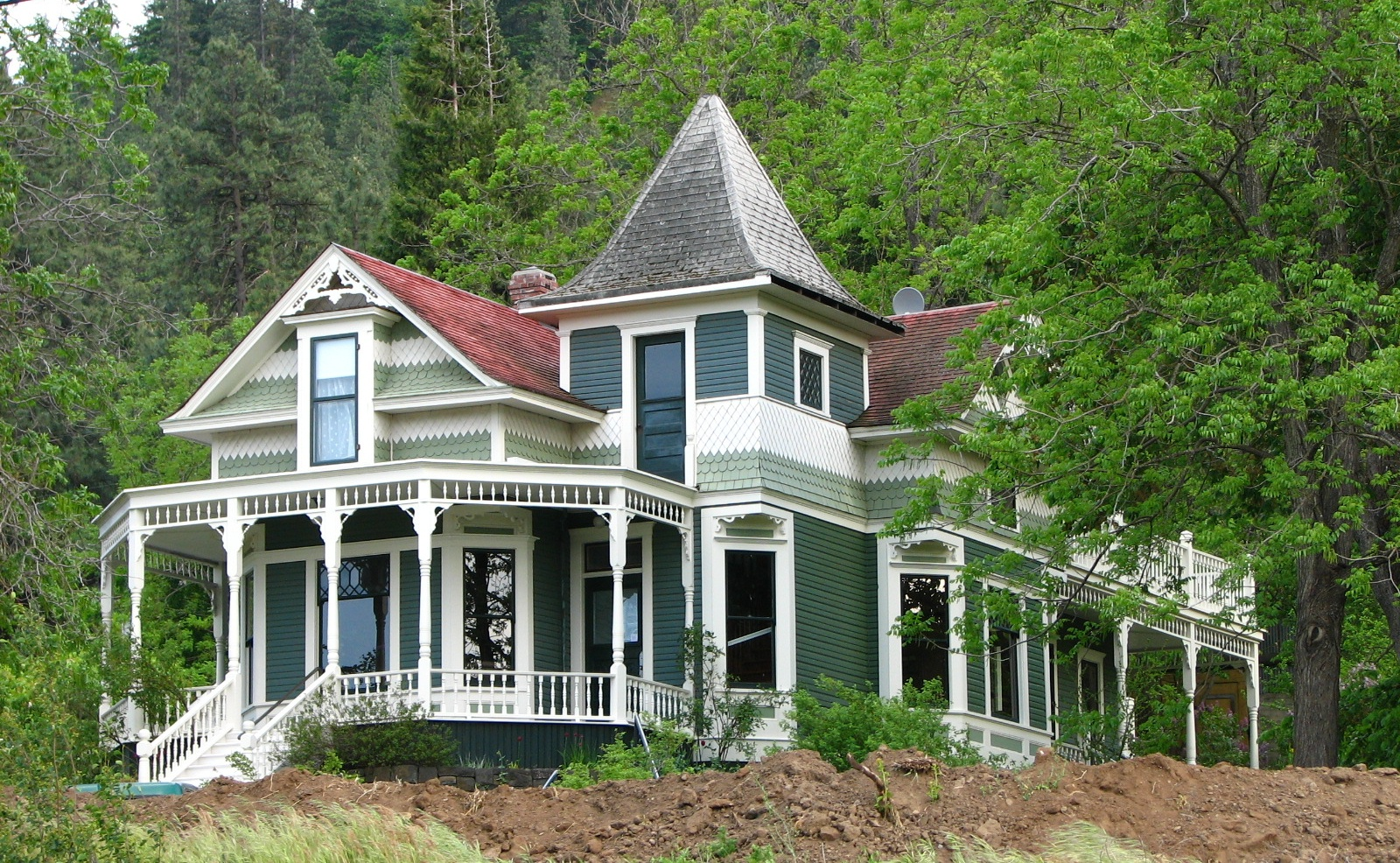
- The Mosier House in 2008
- Location: 704 3rd Avenue; Mosier, Oregon
- Coordinates: 45°40′56″N 121°23′43″W
- Area: 1.67 acres (0.68 ha)
- Built: 1904
- Built by: Mr. Soule
- Architectural style: Queen Anne
- Restored: ca. 1990
- NRHP reference No.: 90000286
- Added to NRHP: February 23, 1990

The Jefferson Mosier House is a historic house in Mosier, Oregon, United States. Jefferson N. Mosier (1860–1928) first platted the town in 1902 on what had been his father's donation land claim, and tirelessly promoted it for decades after. He built this prominent house in 1904, and remained in residence until his death. It is the only Queen Anne building in Mosier, and features many signature characteristics of the type.

The house was added to the National Register of Historic Places in 1990. By 2006, it had been converted for use as a bed and breakfast inn.

== See also ==
- National Register of Historic Places listings in Wasco County, Oregon
