= Rock Fort Campsite =

- U.S. National Register of Historic Places
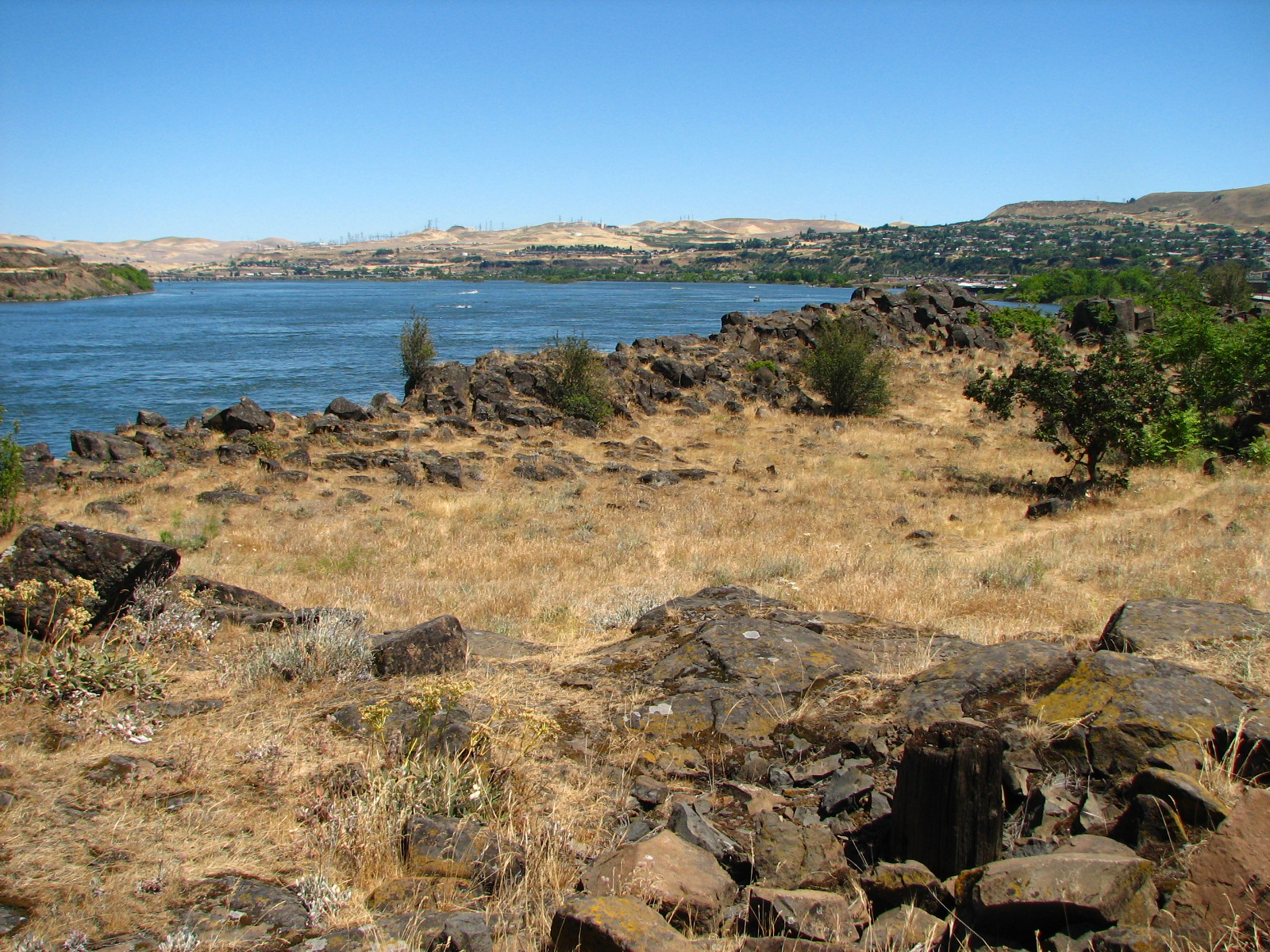
- The Rock Fort Campsite looking upriver (east), the direction the Lewis and Clark Expedition came from when it stopped here.
- Location: West 1st Street; The Dalles, Oregon
- Coordinates: 45°36′25″N 121°11′17″W
- NRHP reference No.: 80003389
- Added to NRHP: September 4, 1980

The Rock Fort Campsite is a natural fortification on the south shore of the Columbia River in The Dalles, Oregon, United States. The Lewis and Clark Expedition camped at this defensible spot for three nights in late October 1805, just after it passed Celilo Falls on its descent to the Pacific Ocean, and again for one night on their return journey. It was here that the expedition first made significant contact and commerce with the Chinookan-speaking peoples of the lower Columbia.

== See also ==
- National Register of Historic Places listings in Wasco County, Oregon
