= Mosier Mounds Complex =

- U.S. National Register of Historic Places
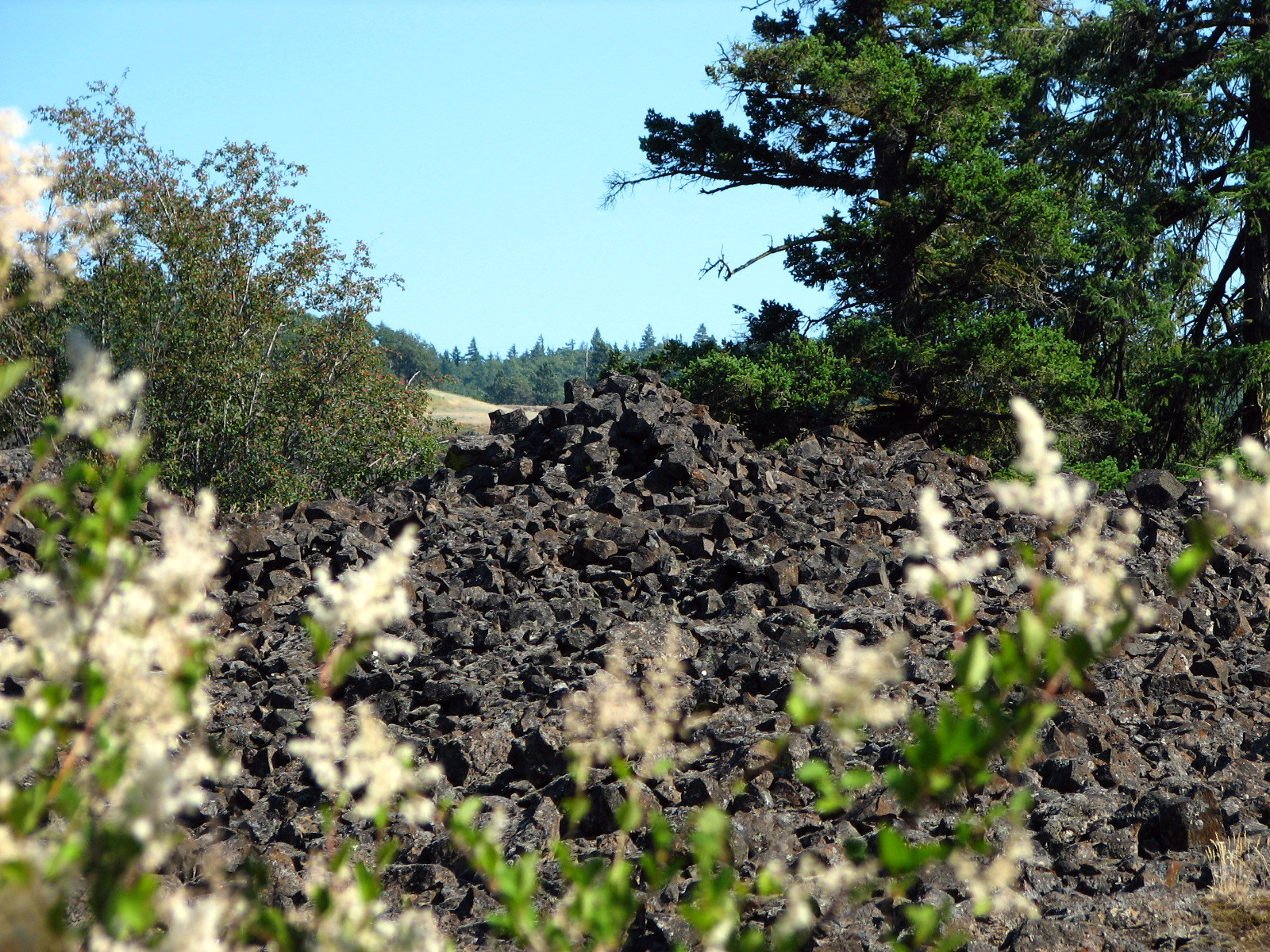
- The Mosier Mounds in 2009
- Location: Address restricted
- Nearest city: Mosier, Oregon
- NRHP reference No.: 03000053
- Added to NRHP: February 24, 2003

The Mosier Mounds Complex (Smithsonian trinomial: 35WS274), also known locally as the Mosier Battlements, is an archaeological site near Mosier, Oregon, United States. This collection of stone walls, pits, and mounds amid a basalt talus slope is the largest and most complex of a number of similar Native American sites in the southern Columbia Plateau. The site predates the arrival of Europeans and probably the local ascendance of Chinookan peoples, but has resisted more precise dating or cultural affiliation.

The site was added to the National Register of Historic Places in 2003.

== See also ==
- National Register of Historic Places listings in Wasco County, Oregon
