= Adventist Health Columbia Gorge =

- Adventist Health
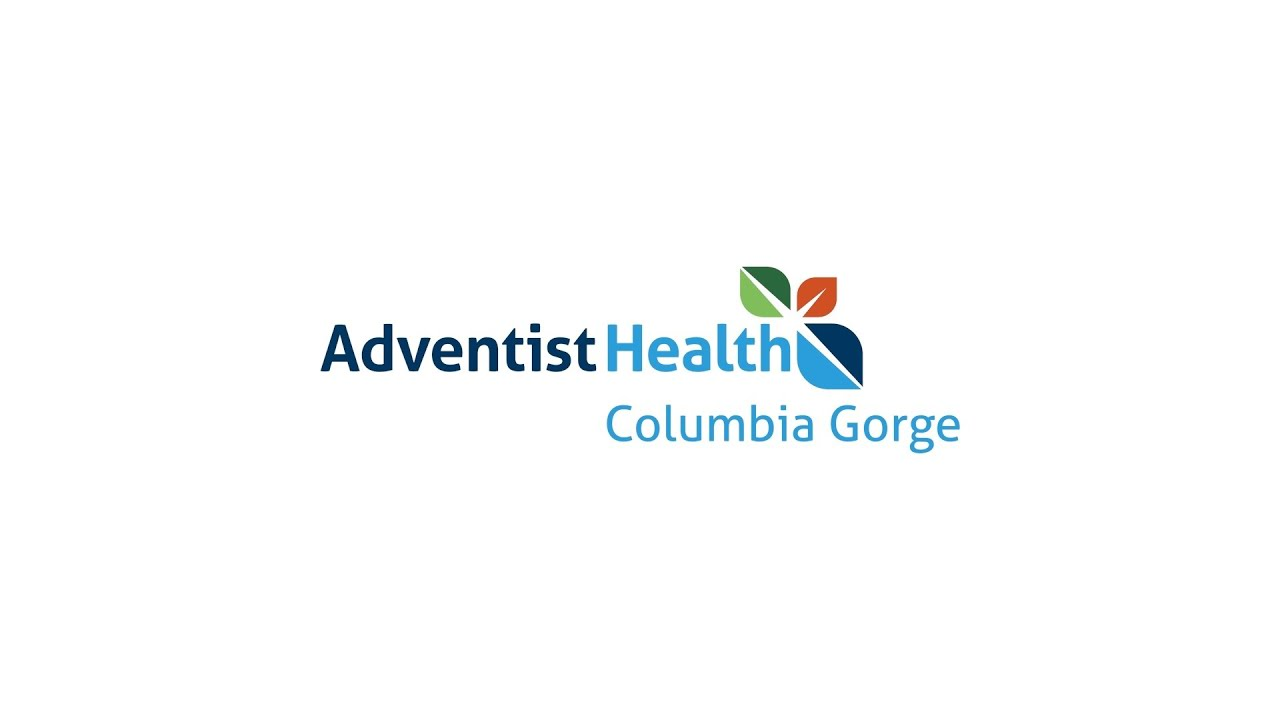

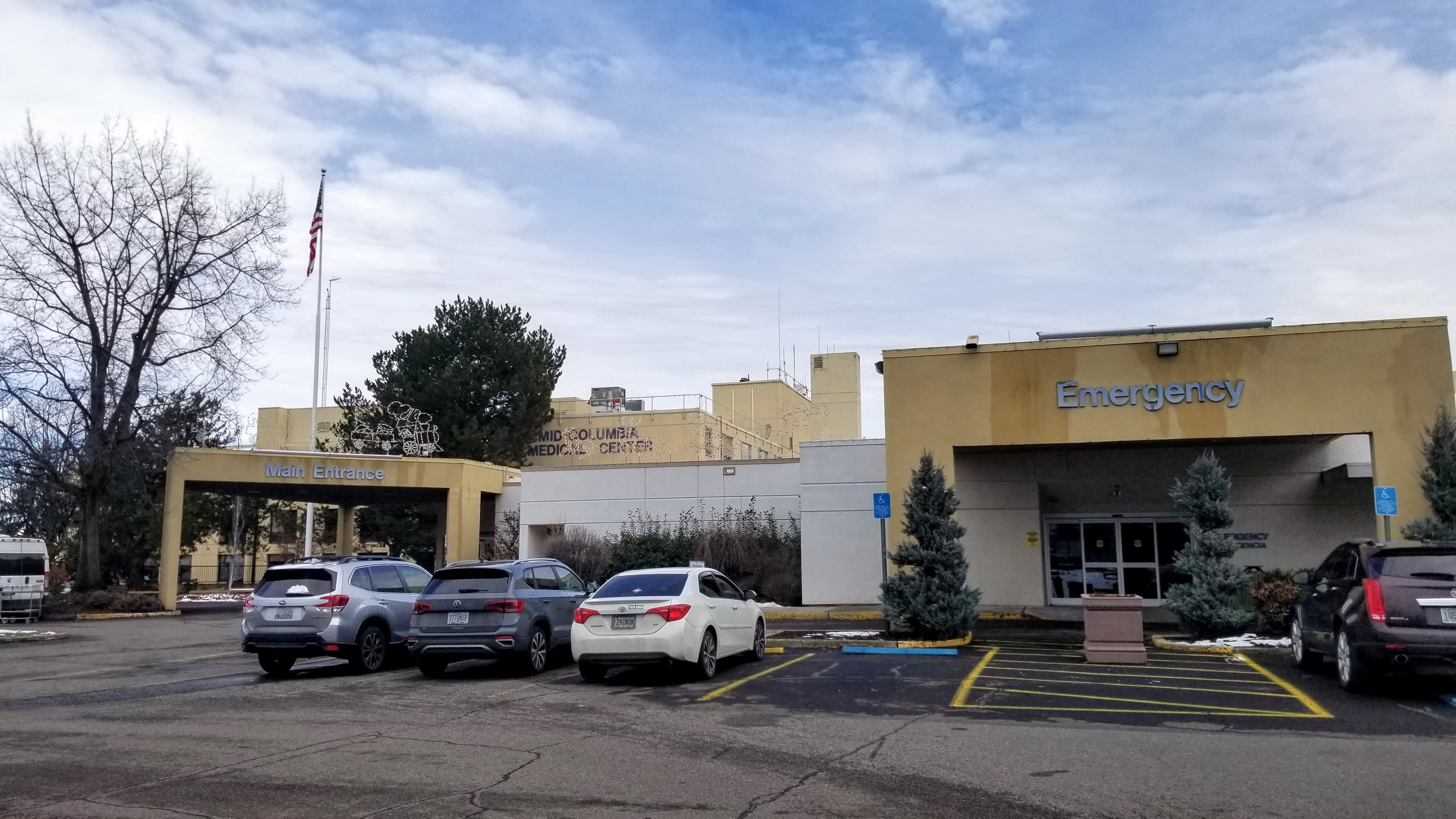
- Hospital entrance in 2024.

Geography
- Location: The Dalles, Oregon, United States
- Coordinates: 45.5875°N 121.16429°W

Organization
- Type: General, acute care

History
- Founded: 1901

Links
- Website: www.adventisthealth.org/columbia-gorge/
- Lists: Hospitals in Oregon

Adventist Health Columbia Gorge is a hospital complex in The Dalles, Oregon, United States.

In June 1992, it became the first hospital in the world to implement the Planetree concept of patient-centered care facility wide and in 2007 the hospital was recognised as a "Designated Patient-Centered Hospital", one of five such hospitals in the country.

On June 14, 2023, the complex known as Mid-Columbia Medical Center (MCMC) for forty years was purchased by Adventist Health.

== History ==
The original hospital in The Dalles was started in 1901 by pioneer doctors, Dr. Belle Cooper Rinehart and Dr. Mary Powell Johnson in the Rinehart family home. Dr. Belle was the widow of a physician and mother of four young boys when she had her mother move in to care for her children and she began studying medicine. She graduated from medical school in 1897 and set up her practice near the location of The Dalles Clinic building on East 7th Street. Belle Cooper Rinehart Ferguson gave high praise to her mother, "…whose encouragement, intelligence and ability imparted strength and determination." Two of Belle's sons became physicians.

In 1903, Dr. Belle Cooper Rinehart married Dr. Elmer Ferguson. They expanded their home and enlarged the hospital, which came to be known as The Dalles Hospital. Dr. John Reuter became their partner in their practice and hospital. Other hospital expansions occurred in 1912 and 1937. They had an approximate 20-bed capacity. When World War II caused a shortage of nurses, The Dalles General Hospital opened a nursing school. Doctors served as nursing instructors until the school closed in 1951.

Donations from local citizens, businesses, physicians and hospital staff helped pay for a new hospital in 1959 on 19th Street. The new hospital was described as one of the most modern hospitals in the country with its electric beds, electric doctor registry (light board), the still to purify tap water in the central supply, and the latest in mercury vapor illumination in the parking lot. The hospital building included the kitchen, laundry, maintenance and supplies on the 1st floor, administration, emergency, pharmacy, lab, x-ray, and maternity on the 2nd floor, medical patients on the 4th and surgical patients on the 3rd floor. The mental hold locked room was located on 4A where the Sleep Center Monitoring/Scoring Room is located.

In 1979, twenty years after opening, the hospital expanded by 20,000 square feet (1,900 m^{2}) to accommodate more patients with more beds and other improvements. The hospital began offering on-site child care and child development services in 1982. In 1983, Ancillary service departments are remodeled and the hospital changes its name to Mid-Columbia Medical Center (MCMC) to more accurately reflect its emergence as a regional resource for comprehensive healthcare. The organization restructures into an independent parent corporation and several corporate entities, which include the hospital, home health and other programs. Also in 1983, the Mid-Columbia Health Foundation is established.

MCMC agreed to become the first hospital to adopt the Planetree model of patient-centered care facility-wide in 1989. The transformation involved a near-complete architectural makeover, a massive training program involving the entire hospital staff and many other significant changes designed to "personalize, humanize and demystify" the hospital experience for patients. In 1990, Dr. Bill Hamilton and Dr. Hal Sessions performed the first laparoscopic gall bladder surgeries in the Columbia River Gorge at MCMC. Patients took home a VHS tape of their surgery. In 1992, MCMC's remodel is complete, transforming the traditional hospital into a comfortable "center of healing" and ushering in the Planetree era.

The hospital was sued by 12 women after sexual abuse by Dr. Fredrick Field was revealed in May 2011. MCMC settled most of the cases and lost a $2.4 million judgment over the abuse.

In 2013 it was reported by an anonymous social worker in Hood River, Oregon, that the primary reason for the majority of bankruptcies filed in the Mid-Columbia area were medical bills incurred at MCMC. It was alleged that MCMC's collections and billing department was primarily to blame for patients being unable to successfully pay off their medical bills. Overcharging for basic services has also been alleged; most unbiased references online comparing normal costs of medical services compared to MCMC clearly indicated that MCMC charges more for their services than other regional facilities.
