= Sentinel Hotel =

Sentinel
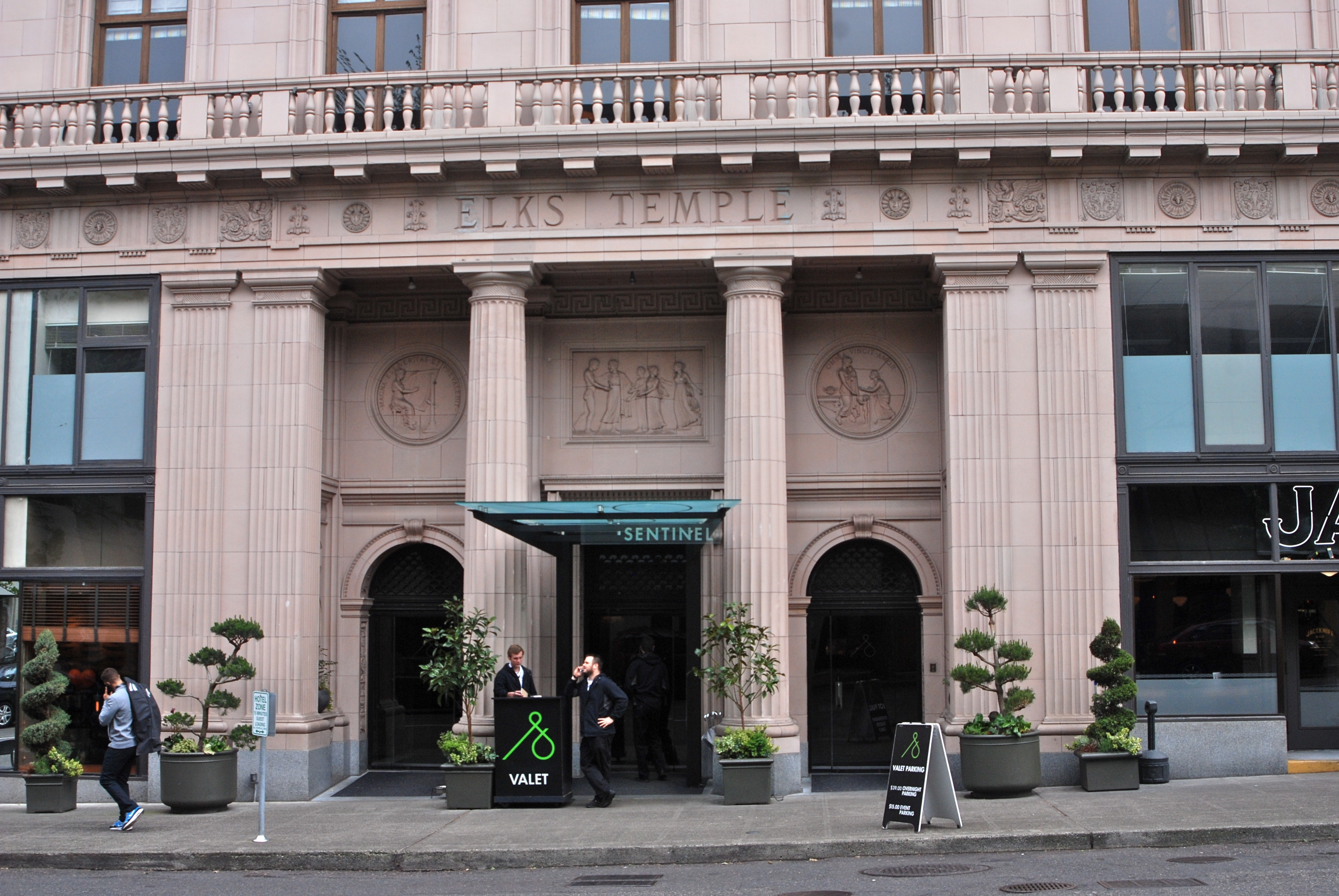
- The hotel's entrance in 2015, with recently restored "Elks Temple" signage above

General information
- Location: 614 SW 11th Avenue; Portland, Oregon, U.S.
- Owner: Provenance Hotels

Technical details
- Floor count: East building: 5 West building: 6

Other information
- Number of restaurants: 3

Website
- www.sentinelhotel.com
- Seward
- U.S. National Register of Historic Places
- Location: 611–619 SW 10th Avenue; Portland, Oregon
- Built: 1909
- Architect: William C. Knighton
- NRHP reference No.: 85000370
- Added to NRHP: February 28, 1985
- Elks Temple
- U.S. National Register of Historic Places
- Location: 614 SW 11th Avenue; Portland, Oregon
- Built: 1923
- Architect: Houghtaling & Dougan
- NRHP reference No.: 78002313
- Added to NRHP: February 17, 1978

The Sentinel is a hotel in downtown Portland, Oregon, United States. It is composed of two buildings, both of which are listed on the National Register of Historic Places (NRHP). The east building was completed in 1909 and was originally the Seward Hotel, while the west building was completed in 1923 as the Elks Temple. The Seward Hotel was renamed the Governor Hotel in 1931. The two buildings were joined in 1992, and together they became an expanded Governor Hotel. In 2004, the hotel's entrance was moved to the west building, the former Elks Temple.

In the early 1990s, the hotel served as the filming location for several films: Portlander Gus Van Sant filmed a scene of My Own Private Idaho and Madonna filmed several scenes of Body of Evidence inside.

In 2003, the hotel was sold to Grand Heritage Hotel Group, who announced plans to close the lobby in the east building and make the west building's lobby, on 11th Avenue, the main entrance. At that time, the hotel had 100 rooms and suites, and 13 meeting rooms. The former 10th Avenue lobby area would be used for an expansion of Jake's Grill restaurant.

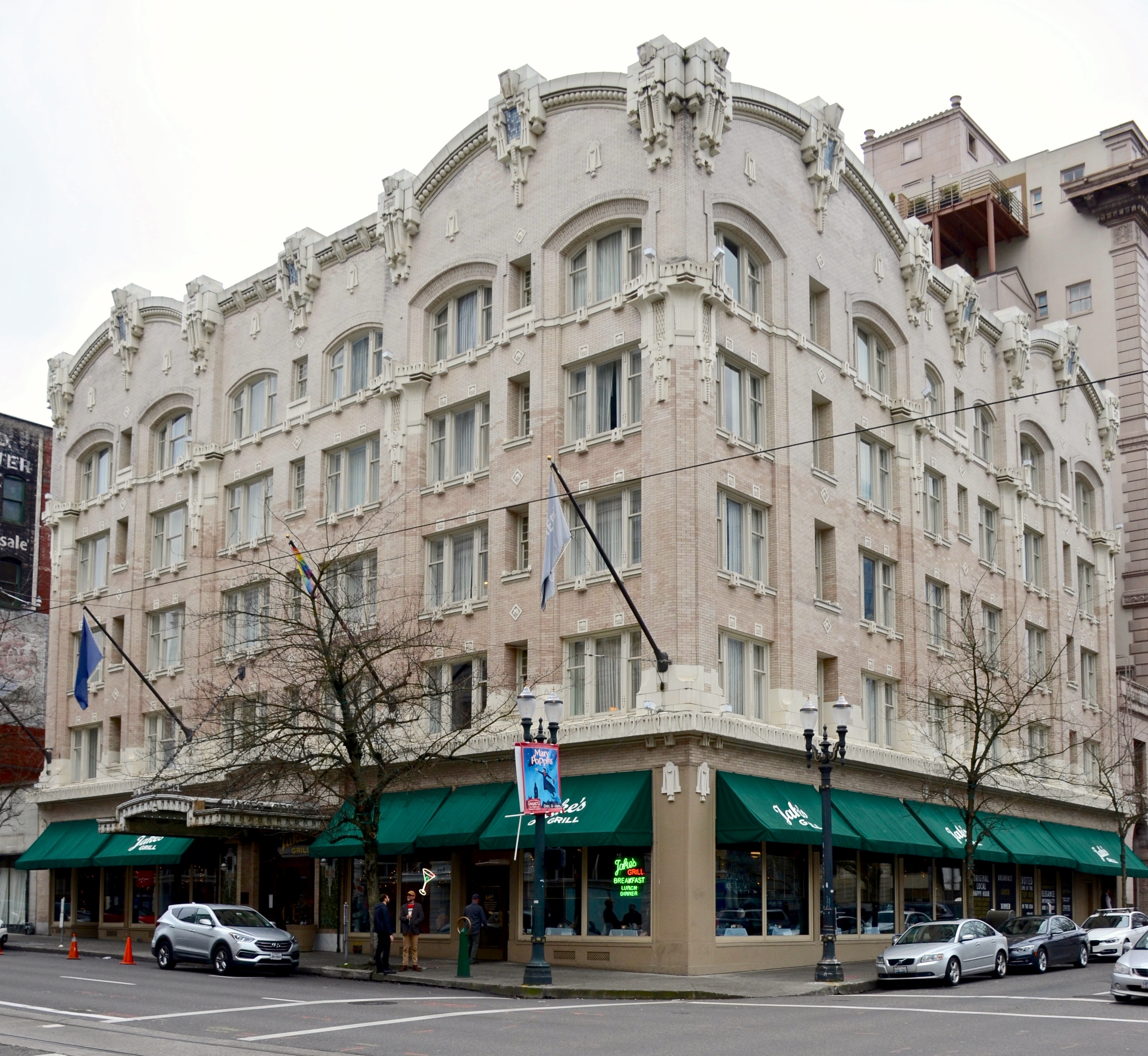
The hotel's east wing, the older of its two buildings, with the (taller) west wing in the righthand background

The Governor Hotel was sold again in 2012, to Portland-based Provenance Hotels. The company invested $6 million in renovations, and renamed the hotel the Sentinel on March 14, 2014. The name is a reference to the robot-like stone sentinel sculptures along the roofline of the east building (the former Seward Hotel). Many conferences, civic events, and banquets are hosted in the hotel. The City Club of Portland has been hosting its weekly Friday Forums there since 2004.

== See also ==
- Architecture in Portland, Oregon
- Governor Hotel (disambiguation)
- Jackknife Bar
