= Unicorn Bake Shop =

Defunct bakery in Portland, Oregon, U.S.

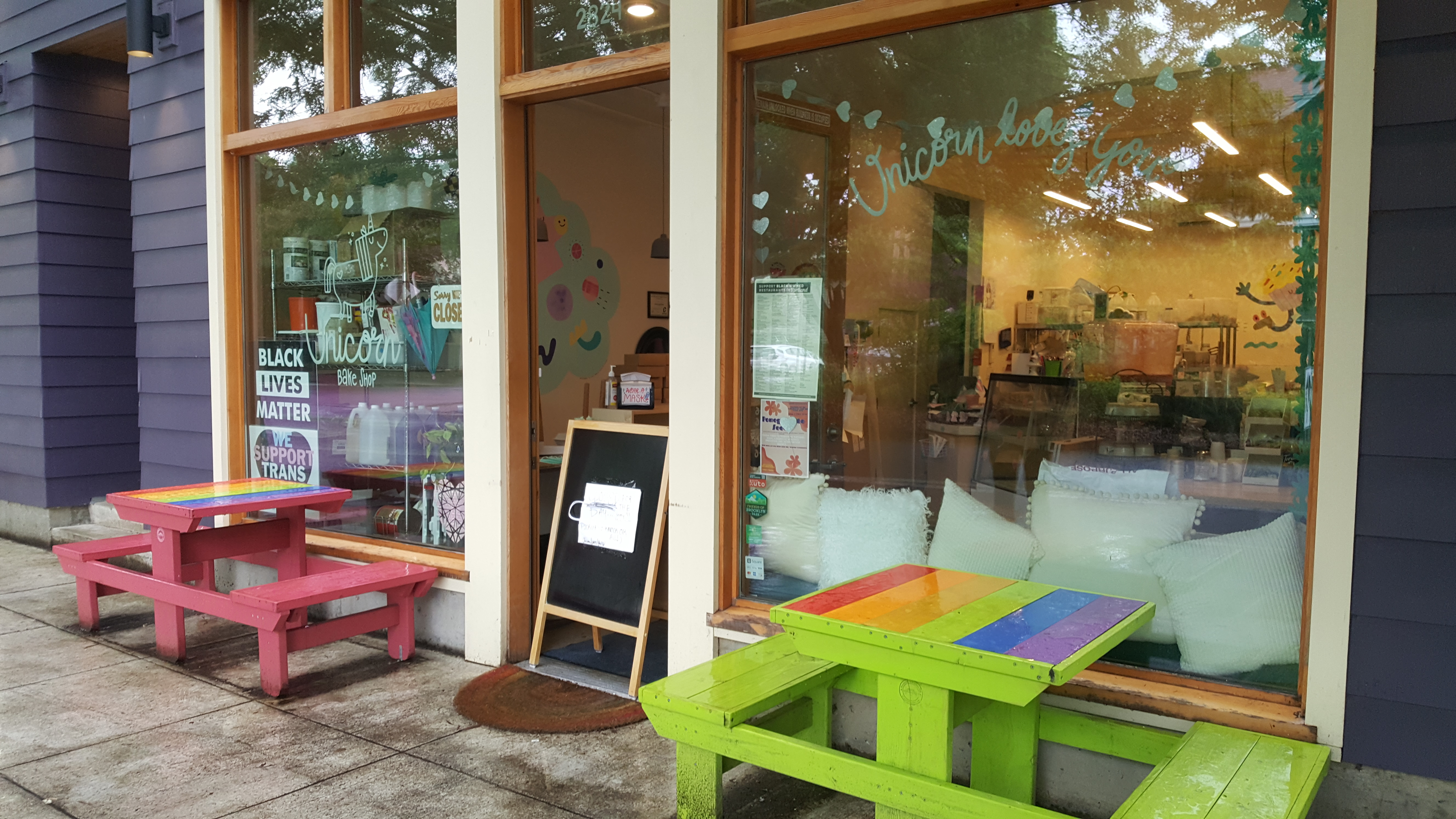
- The bakery's exterior, 2022
- Interactive map of Unicorn Bake Shop

Restaurant information
- Established: February 29, 2020
- Closed: February 29, 2024
- Owner: Carrie Padian
- Food type: Vegan
- Location: 2824 Southeast Gladstone Street, Portland, Multnomah, Oregon, 97202, United States
- Coordinates: 45.4932°N 122.6369°W
- Website: unicornbakeshop.com

Unicorn Bake Shop was a bakery in Portland, Oregon, United States. Carrie Padian opened the storefront in southeast Portland's Creston-Kenilworth neighborhood in February 2020, after operating a home kitchen since 2016. The business specialized in gluten-free and vegan baked goods such as cakes, cupcakes, cookies, macarons, and pies, along with drinks including coffee and tea. Unicorn garnered a positive reception and was included in a 2024 list of the 16 best bakeries in the nation for vegan cupcakes by VegNews. The bakery's storefront closed permanently on February 29, 2024, after operating for exactly four years.

== Description ==
The family-friendly bakery Unicorn Bake Shop operated on Gladstone Street in southeast Portland, Oregon's Creston-Kenilworth neighborhood. The interior had white walls and a pastel mural by artist Ryan Bubnis that depicted cookies, a roller-skating cupcake, and unicorns. The Oregonian and Eater Portland described the bakery as "colorful" and "whimsical", respectively. The magazine PDX Parent called Unicorn "joyful".

Unicorn operated within the mixed-use development known as Jolene's First Cousin, which was built by Guerrilla Development. The business had a subscription service that delivered baked goods to customers.

=== Menu ===
The menu featured gluten-free and vegan baked goods. The "unicorn bar" was made of sugar cookie and had frosting and "super-adorable" sprinkles. Macarons included a colorful sherbet variety and another that was decorated to resemble a cheeseburger, while cookies included a "Defund the Police" option with pieces of Andes Chocolate Mints as well as the vegan "Universal Preschool". Among cupcake varieties were blueberry-waffle, chocolate, Funfetti, lemon, Oreo, red velvet, strawberry, and vanilla.

According to Eater Portland, Unicorn's desserts like cakes and mousses were not "saccharine sweet" because the owner preferred to use chocolate and salt for balance. Cakes were decorated with cookies, "sparkly" frosting, and unicorn horns. Varieties included Funfetti and strawberry, using various buttercream options and fillings such as raspberry jam. "Mini" and full-size cakes were available. Unicorn also offered pies, coffee, and tea.

Unicorn had holiday specials. For the holiday season in late 2021, the bakery offered special varieties, including Egg Nog and Orange Rosemary as well as the gluten-free Frostry and Salted Caramel Apple options. Unicorn also carried almond shortbread dipped in chocolate as well as gingerbread cookie bars. In 2022, the business offered chocolate brownie bites in the shape of heart symbols, strawberry cupcakes dipped in chocolate, and sugar-cookie lollipops for Valentine's Day.

== History ==
Unicorn was owned by Carrie Padian, who started operating a home kitchen in 2016. In January 2019, during the 2018–2019 United States federal government shutdown, Unicorn offered 4-inch (10 cm) custom celebration cakes or a $40 discount on larger orders for federal employees in financial stress.

In February 2020, Brooke Jackson-Glidden of Eater Portland described Padian's plan to open a storefront for Unicorn on February 29. The bakery's murals were painted by the time of the Leap Year grand opening.

Unicorn was among approximately 100 businesses in the Portland metropolitan area to participate in the 2022 "Shop Small Win Big" event, which supports local businesses. In late 2023, Padian said Unicorn was experiencing a financial strain. She wrote on social media that the shop made insufficient sales and urged its customers to spend their money on small businesses.

Unicorn's shop closed permanently on February 29, 2024, after operating for exactly four years. The Oregonian said the closure was part of a "rash of recent shutters" of local bakeries. Similarly, KGW said the closure was among several local vegan establishments that stopped operating around the same time, including Blossoming Lotus, Fermenter, and Sweet Hereafter. Padian continued to fulfill custom cake orders from her home after Unicorn's storefront closed.

== Reception ==
In Eater Portland's 2024 overview of recommendations for birthday cakes in the city, Michelle Lopez, Brooke Jackson-Glidden, and Janey Wong stated Unicorn was "ideal for kids' birthday parties", a sentiment shared by Denise Castañon of PDX Parent. The magazine VegNews included Unicorn in a 2024 list of the 16 best bakeries in the nation for vegan cupcakes. NW Kids Magazine recommended Unicorn for custom cakes for birthday parties and celebrations.

== See also ==
- List of bakeries
- List of defunct restaurants of the United States
- List of vegetarian and vegan restaurants
