= Jackknife Bar =

Bar in Portland, Oregon, U.S.

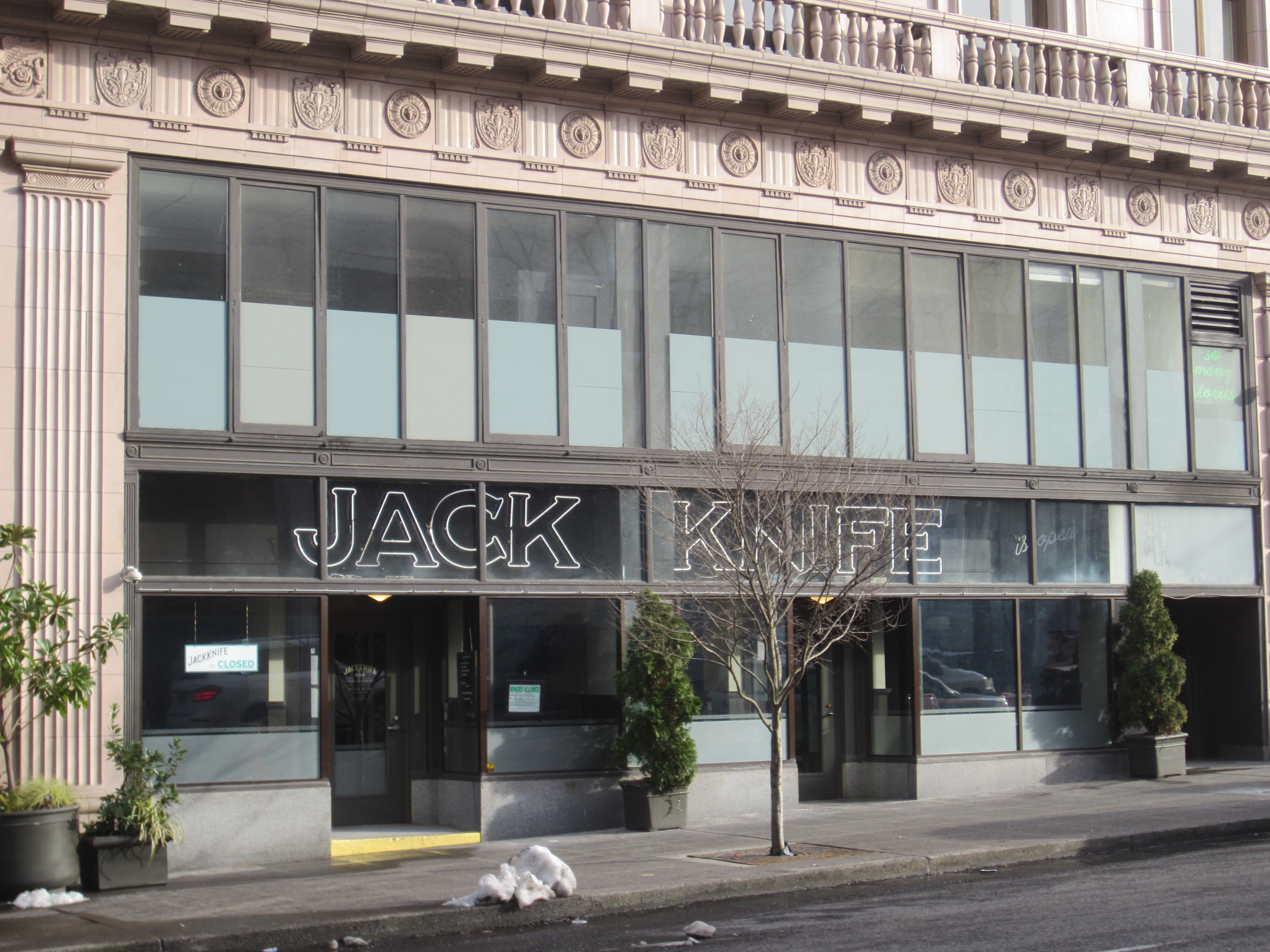
- The bar's exterior in February 2021
- Interactive map of Jackknife Bar

Restaurant information
- Established: April 2014
- Closed: May 2020
- Location: 614 Southwest 11th Avenue, Portland, Multnomah, Oregon, 97205, United States
- Coordinates: 45.5206°N 122.6824°W

Jackknife Bar, or simply Jackknife, was a bar in Portland, Oregon. The 4,000-square-foot cocktail bar was housed in the Sentinel Hotel, before closing in May 2020, during the COVID-19 pandemic.

== Description ==
The interior featured a 50-seat, 65-foot-long curved marble and wood-lined bar, as well as a domed stained glass ceiling.

== History ==
Jake Carey and John Janulis opened the bar in April 2014, with Justin Diaz overseeing the bar operation and Erik Paulsen as chef. Russell Van der Genugten became executive chef in March 2015.

In 2019, a man was removed from the bar for wearing a shirt with the text "Anti-Fascist"; Jackknife's parent company Lightning Bar Collective (Bye and Bye, Sweet Hereafter, Victoria Bar) said the policy against clothing promoting hate groups was "misinterpreted" by a contracted security guard.

The bar closed in May 2020, during the COVID-19 pandemic.

== Reception ==
Eater included Jackknife in a list of the "most beautiful restaurants" in the U.S. Samantha Bakall said the bar has a "relaxed vibe that heats up as the night goes on". In his 2019 list of "Best Bars for Single Mingling in Portland", Pete Cottell of Thrillist described Jackknife as a "moderately fancy hotel bar ... that's known for eclectic DJ nights, tasty cocktails, and an overall vibe that celebs like Bruno Mars or Pharrell would probably dig."

== See also ==
- Impact of the COVID-19 pandemic on the restaurant industry in the United States
