= Granada Theater (The Dalles, Oregon) =

- U.S. Historic district – Contributing property
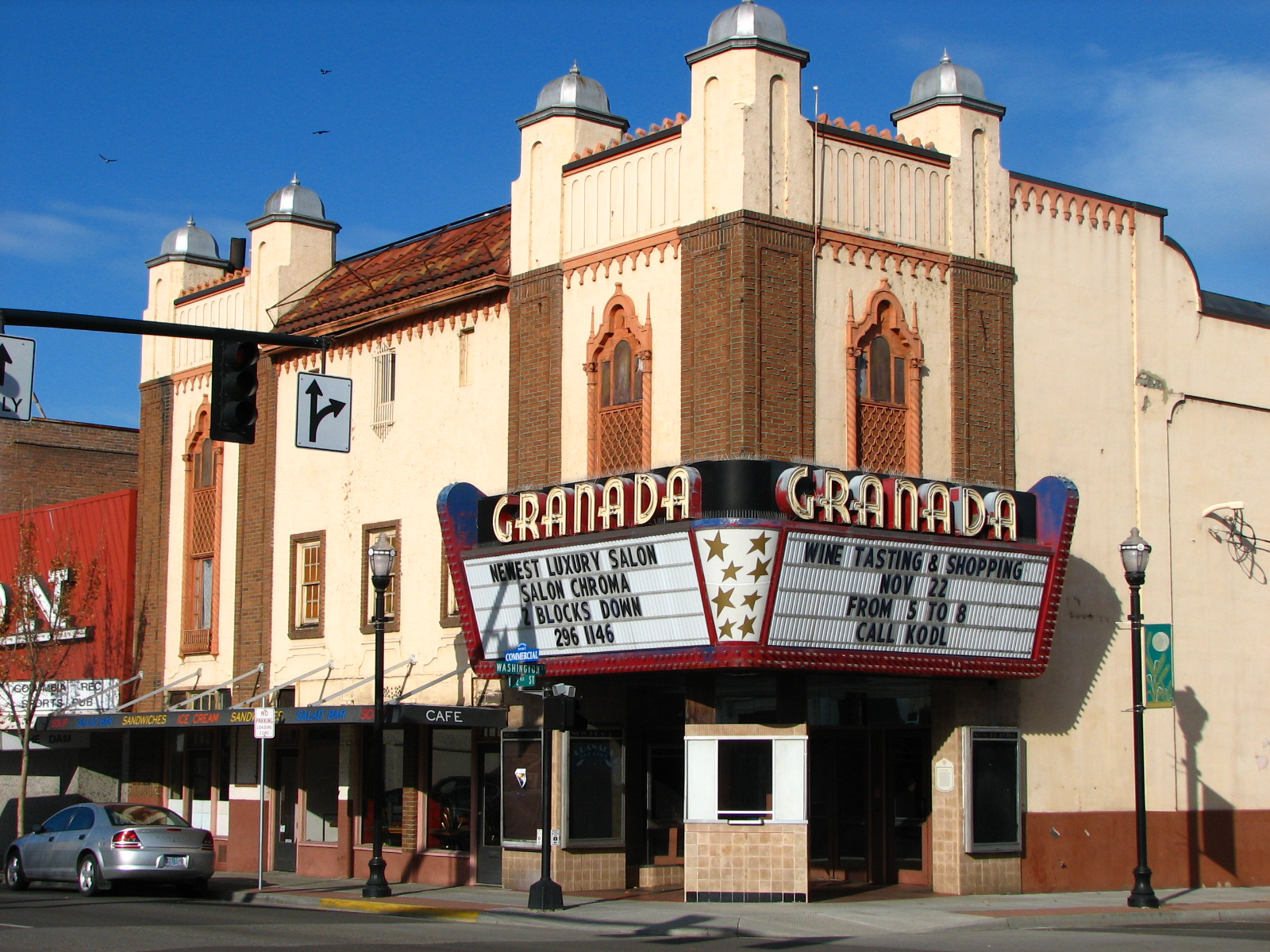
- The Granada Theater in 2008.

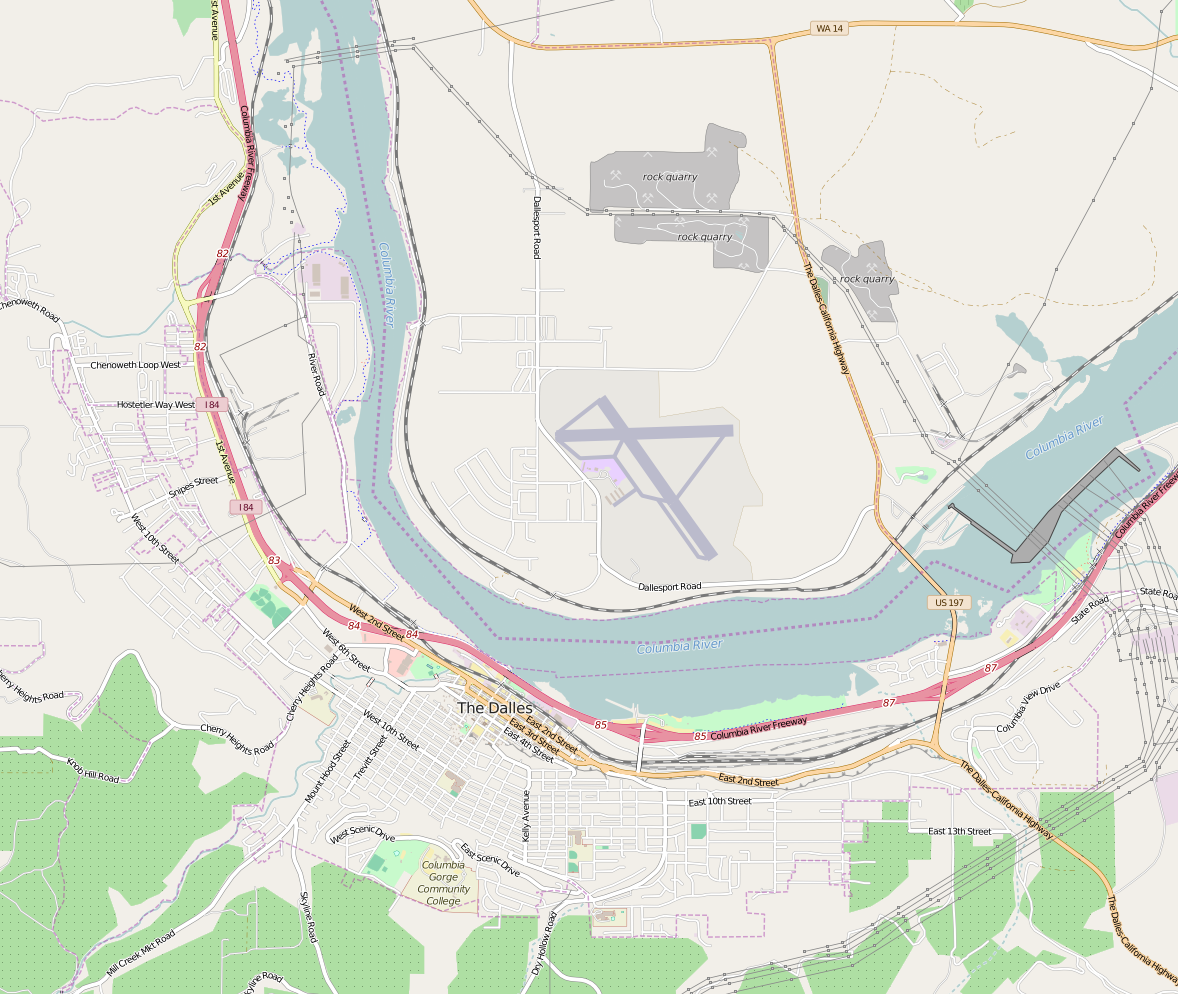
- Location within The Dalles OR
- Location: 221 E. 2nd Street; The Dalles, Oregon
- Coordinates: 45°36′06″N 121°10′55″W
- Built: 1929
- Built by: M.R. Matthew
- Architect: William Cutts
- Architectural style: Moorish Revival
- Restored: 1996
- Part of: The Dalles Commercial Historic District (ID86002953)
- Added to NRHP: November 4, 1986

The Granada Theater, located on 2nd and Washington streets in The Dalles, Oregon, United States, was built in 1929. The exterior of theater is in the Moorish Revival style.

== History ==
The theater was designed by architect William A. Cutts for the Universal Film Corporation and building owner M.R. Matthew. Initial costs totaled $125,000. The building was equipped with Vitaphone and Movietone sound systems. This theater is said to have been the first theater west of the Mississippi to show a "talkie".

The building's corner marquee was added in the 1950s.

In 1986 the building was added to The Dalles Commercial Historic District.

The city of The Dalles purchased the theater in September 2010. In March 2017 the building was sold to new owners, who planned to renovate and reopen the building. The theater reopened in November of that year, with its facade repainted as it would have been in 1929.

The theater received funding from the Oregon Parks and Recreation Department during the COVID-19 pandemic, in order to fund repairs and to keep the building open.
