= The Dalles Carnegie Library =

- U.S. National Register of Historic Places
- U.S. Historic district – Contributing property
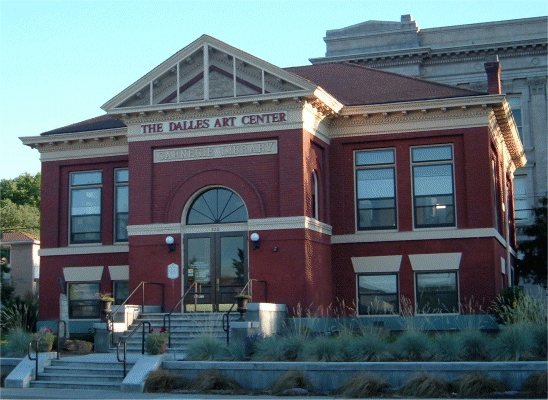
- The Dalles Art Center (old Carnegie Library) in 2006

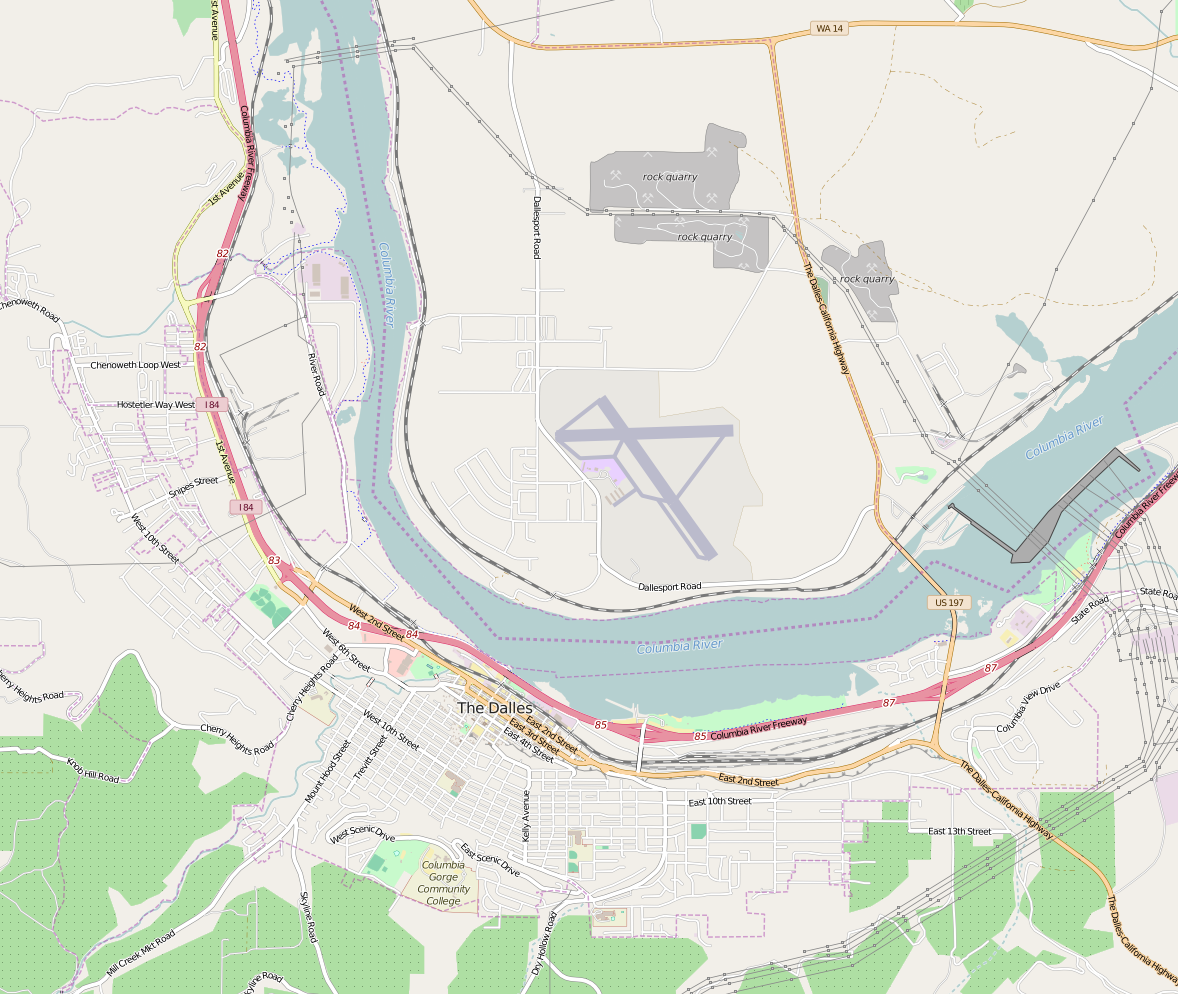
- Location within The Dalles OR
- Location: 220 E. 4th Street; The Dalles, Oregon
- Coordinates: 45°36′00″N 121°11′01″W
- Area: Lot: 10,000 square feet (930 m^{2})
- Built: 1910
- Architectural style: Beaux-Arts
- Part of: The Dalles Commercial Historic District (ID86002953)
- NRHP reference No.: 78002325
- Added to NRHP: December 8, 1978

The Dalles Carnegie Library is a historic former library building located in The Dalles, Oregon, United States. It is one of the thousands of libraries whose construction was funded by Andrew Carnegie. The construction grant of $10,000 was approved in March 1907, and it was dedicated in September 1910.

The building was used as the local public library until September 1966. In 1967 the building was leased from the city and converted into an art center. In 1997 the city deeded the building The Dalles Art Association, which continues the building's arts function. The building was added to the National Register of Historic Places in 1978.

The building is approximately 50 by 36 feet (15 by 11 m), is Beaux-Arts classical in style, and is constructed of brick with concrete foundation walls and window sills. There is a hip roof and tall brick chimneys with flared tops extending above the eaves. The building remains much as it was when constructed, with extensive original trim, a fireplace on the south wall upstairs, large windows, and the integrity of the exterior appearance is intact. Some minor modifications, including a small office and kitchenette have been added in the southwest corner upstairs.

== See also ==
- National Register of Historic Places listings in Wasco County, Oregon
