= The Dalles Commercial Historic District =

Historic district in Oregon, United States

- U.S. National Register of Historic Places
- U.S. Historic district
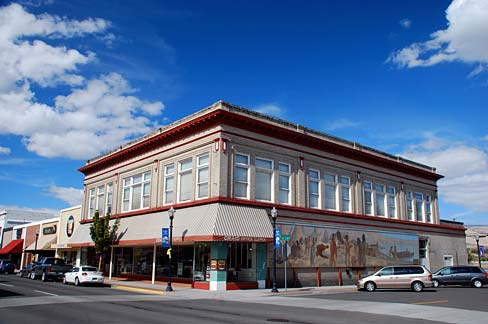
- The district's Edward C. Pease Department Store (historic name, 1911), at the corner of 2nd and Federal Streets, in 2010

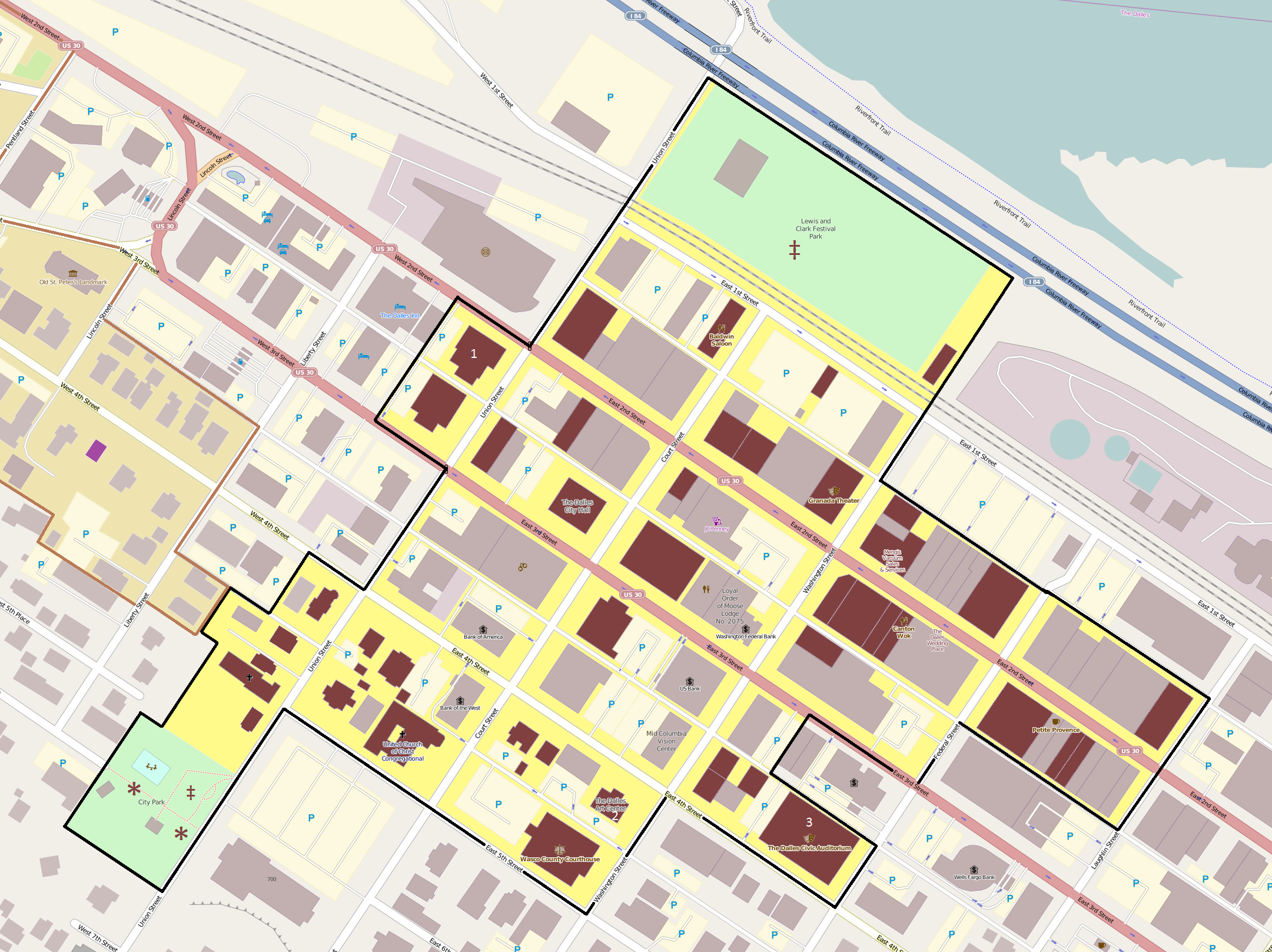
- The Dalles Commercial Historic District boundaries in downtown The Dalles
- Location: The Dalles, Oregon, roughly bounded by Interstate 84 and Laughlin, 5th, and Union Streets
- Coordinates: 45°36′04″N 121°11′00″W
- Area: 34.46 acres (13.95 ha)
- Built: 1860–1945
- Architectural style: Gothic Revival, Italianate, Queen Anne, Colonial Revival, Classical Revival, Renaissance Revival, Commercial, Modernistic, Moorish Revival
- NRHP reference No.: 86002953; 90000542 (decrease)

Significant dates
- Added to NRHP: November 4, 1986
- Boundary increase: June 15, 1998
- Boundary decrease: April 5, 1990

The Dalles Commercial Historic District comprises a primarily commercial and civic portion of downtown The Dalles, Oregon, United States. Strategically located at the eastern end of the Columbia River Gorge and near Celilo Falls, The Dalles became the preeminent transportation and trading hub of the interior Northwest in the 19th and early 20th centuries. The 46 historic buildings and other features of the district, built between 1860 and 1938, (Note: The district's 1997 National Register nomination file listed the Port of The Dalles Grain Elevator, built in 1942, as a contributing resource in the district. However the grain elevator was subsequently removed, leaving 1938 as the most recent date of construction of a contributing building.) reflect the city's status and evolution as the gateway to the Columbia Plateau and the commercial, governmental, and cultural center of Eastern Oregon.

The district was added to the National Register of Historic Places in 1986.

== See also ==
- National Register of Historic Places listings in Wasco County, Oregon
- The Dalles Carnegie Library
- The Dalles Civic Auditorium
- United States Post Office (The Dalles, Oregon, 1916)
- Granada Theater (The Dalles, Oregon)
