= Elks Temple (Portland, Oregon) =

Historic building in Portland, Oregon, U.S.

- U.S. National Register of Historic Places
- Portland Historic Landmark
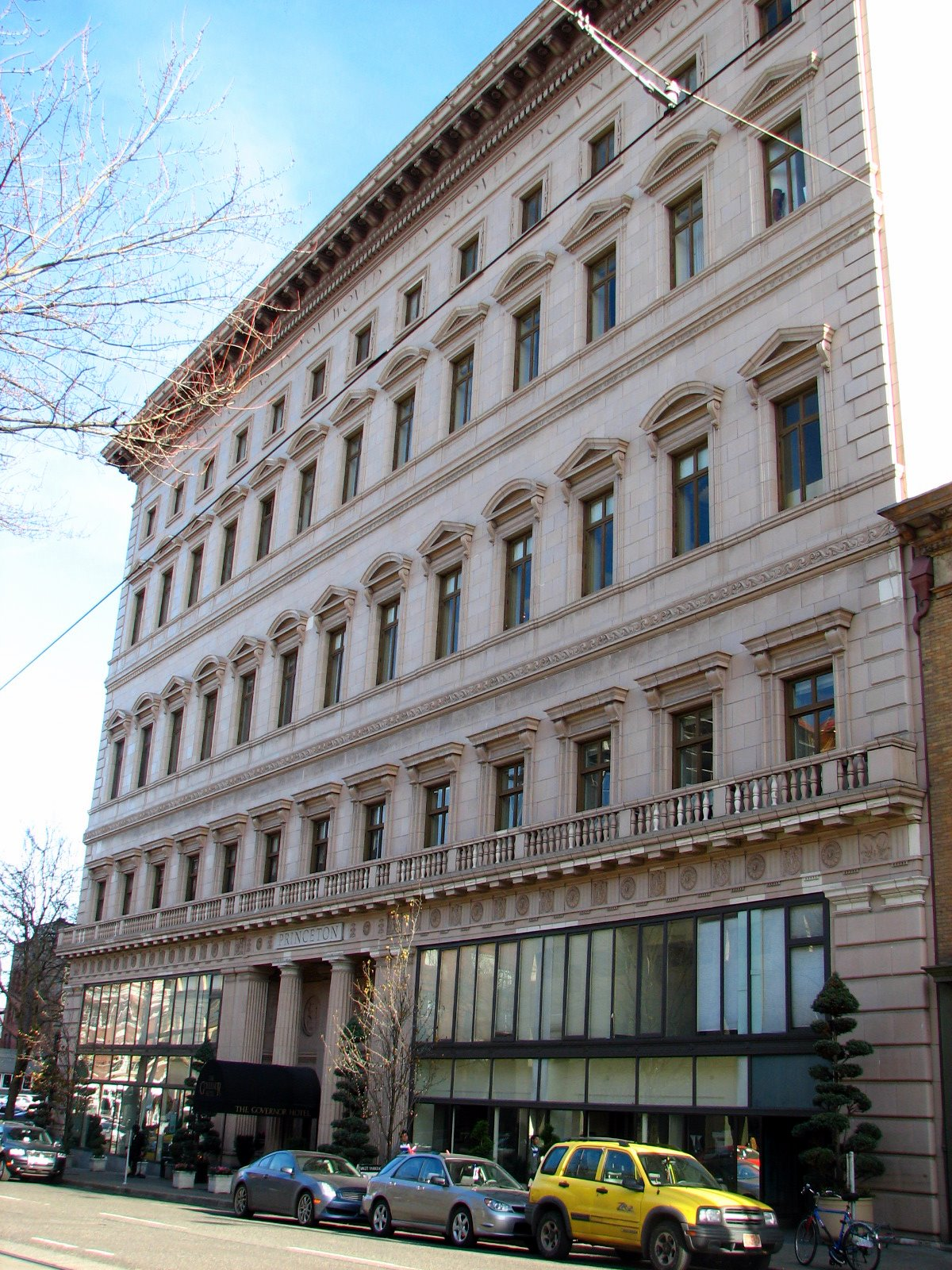
- The former Elks Temple in 2009, when it was part of the Governor Hotel

- Location within Portland, Oregon Location within Oregon Location within the United States
- Location: 614 SW 11th Avenue; Portland, Oregon
- Coordinates: 45°31′14″N 122°40′57″W
- Area: 0.3 acres (0.12 ha)
- Built: 1922–1923
- Architect: Houghtaling & Dougan
- Architectural style: Late 19th and 20th Century Revivals, Second Renaissance Revival
- NRHP reference No.: 78002313
- Added to NRHP: February 17, 1978

The Elks Temple, also known as the Princeton Building and as the west wing of the Sentinel hotel, is a former Elks building and historic hotel building in downtown Portland, Oregon, United States. Built in 1923, it is one of two NRHP-listed buildings that make up the Sentinel Hotel, the other being the 1909-built Seward Hotel. The Seward was renamed the Governor Hotel in 1932, and in 1992 it was joined with the former Elks building, and thereafter the building became the west wing of a two-building hotel, an expanded Governor Hotel. The hotel's main entrance was moved to this building from the east building in 2004. The Governor Hotel was renamed the Sentinel Hotel in 2014. Use of the building as an Elks temple lasted less than a decade, ending in 1932.

== History ==
Construction of the building began on the last day of 1922 and was completed in December 1923. According to the 1977 document nominating the building for listing on the NRHP, the Elks Temple was, at the time of its construction, "the most important building project undertaken in Portland in 10 years". It was designed by Houghtaling & Dougan. It was believed to be the largest Elks lodge in the country and was built at a cost exceeding a million dollars. There were 3,800 Elks members in Portland at the time. After the 1929 stock market crash, Portland-area Elks membership declined steeply, and by 1932 had dwindled to 450. The Portland chapter went bankrupt in July 1932, lost title to the building, and moved out. The six-story building was then vacant for seven years, until 1939. The Works Progress Administration moved in at that time, and during World War II the U.S. Army's induction headquarters for Portland were located here. In the 1950s, two health clubs used the space. The building had always included a swimming pool and gymnasium, originally for use by Elks members. Then followed an even lengthier period of vacancy, from 1959 to 1973.

The former Elks Temple was designated a Portland Historic Landmark by the city's Historical Landmarks Commission in 1970, and was listed on the NRHP in 1978, as the Elks Temple (Old), or Old Elks Temple.

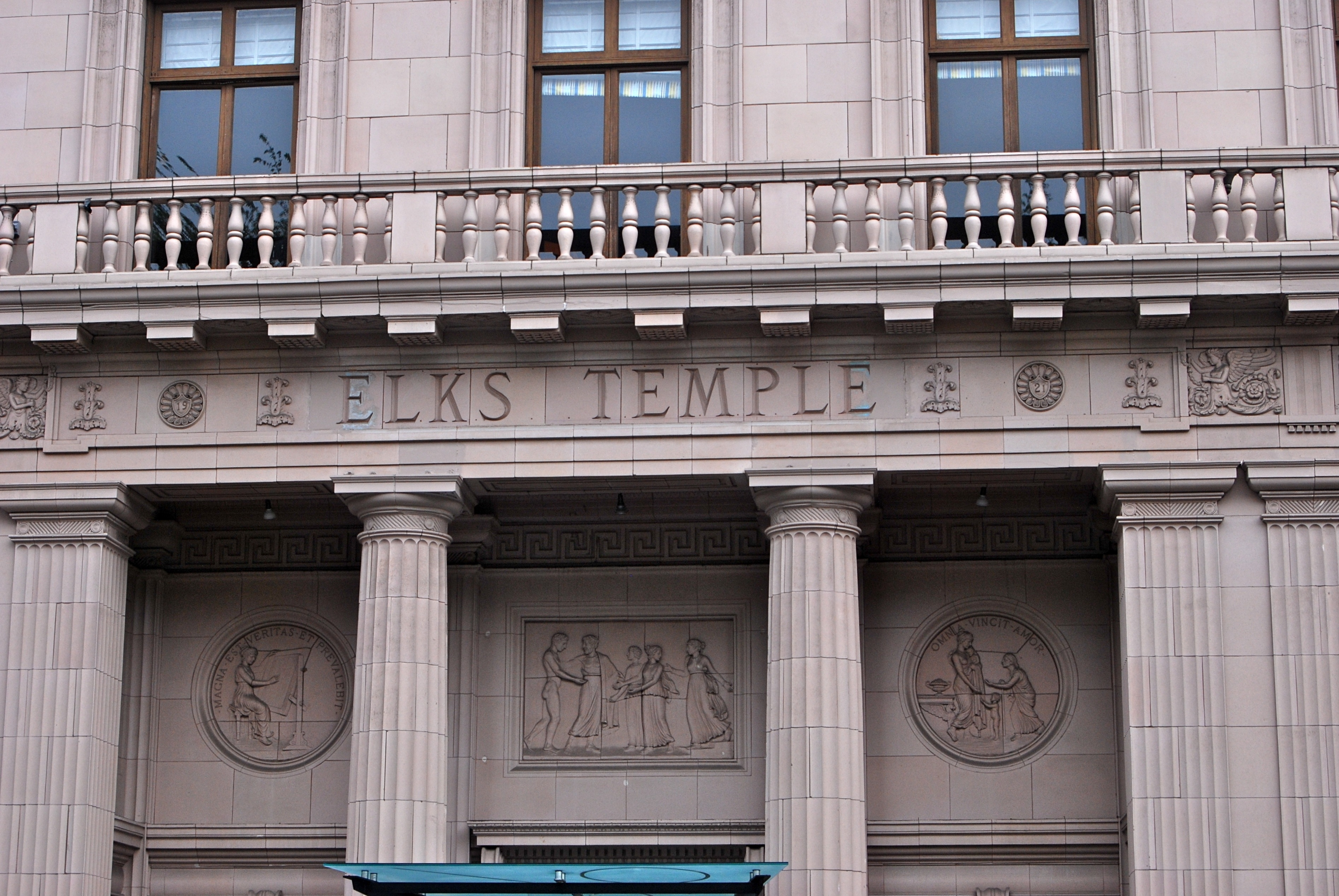
In 2014, the "Elks Temple" lettering above the entrance to the newly renamed hotel was restored, by removal of the "Princeton" sign that had covered it since 1985.

In 1985, the Elks Temple was renamed the Princeton Building, after extensive renovations. It was an office building at that time. The work included the addition of three new mezzanines, and the building's usable space was increased from 60,000 ft^{2} (5,600 m^{2}) to 95,000 ft^{2} (8,800 m^{2}). Another health club was also among the tenants in the late 1980s, the Princeton Athletic Club, occupying about 21,000 ft^{2} (2,000 m^{2}) feet of space.

In 1992, the building was acquired by the Governor Hotel (then occupying the former Seward Hotel building, adjacent to the Princeton) and became the west wing of that hotel. When the Governor Hotel was remodeled in 2004, the main lobby was moved to the Princeton Building or "West Wing".

The Governor Hotel was sold to Provenance Hotels in 2012 and renovated, and in 2014 it was renamed the Sentinel Hotel.

== See also ==
- List of Elks buildings
- National Register of Historic Places listings in Southwest Portland, Oregon
