= Jones Cash Store =

Defunct business and historic building in Portland, Oregon, U.S.

- U.S. National Register of Historic Places
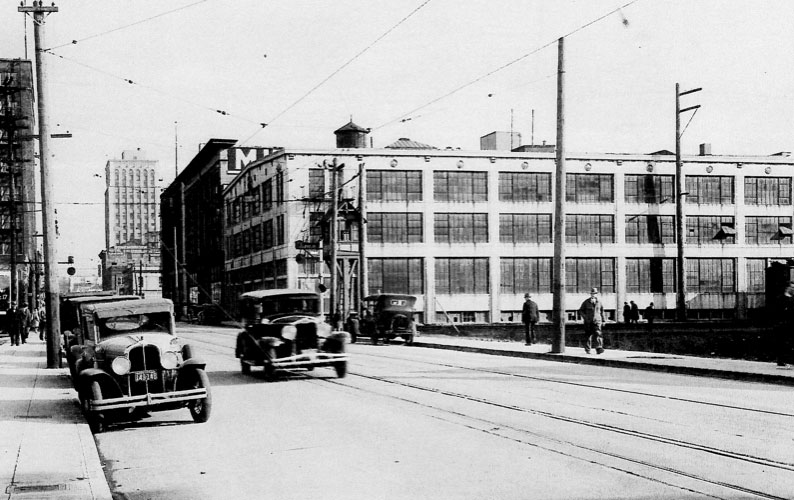
- View of Jones Cash Store from SE Morrison Street near SE Water Avenue, in the 1930s
- Location: 111 SE Belmont Street; Portland, Oregon
- Coordinates: 45°31′01″N 122°39′52″W
- Built: 1921
- Architect: Houghtaling & Dougan
- NRHP reference No.: 05001148
- Added to NRHP: 2005

The Jones Cash Store was a mail order catalog business established by Portland, Oregon, entrepreneur Henry J. Ottenheimer in 1882, and is a building listed on the National Register of Historic Places. Before moving to a larger, more prominent location, the Jones Cash Store operated out of a building at 80 and 82 Front Street in the downtown area of Portland. As popularity of the mail order catalog grew throughout the Pacific Northwest, Henry sought to find a larger building within which to operate. He later purchased the property at 111 SE Belmont Street and began construction on his state-of-the-art 80,000-square-foot (7,400 m^{2}) catalog supply store. Because of its location by the railroad tracks and the river, the store could easily ship and receive goods by railroad, steamer ship, and via truck. The building remained the Jones Cash Store until 1929 at which time it was sold to Montgomery Ward.

Since 1929, the building has been used as a cold storage facility, a fresh produce distribution facility, an electrical supply warehouse, a bicycle supply warehouse, and several other uses. In 2009, Belmont & Morrison LLC was formed with the intent of saving the venerable old building from the wrecking ball. During the latter half of 2009 and continuing into 2010, a major architectural and structural rehabilitation was done of the entire facility. As a result, the building is now more structurally sound than it ever was at any point in its history. All work has been done to current building standards while maintaining as much of the historic look and feel of the building as possible. The building is now used by a local self-storage company named Rose City Self Storage & Wine Vaults.
