= United States Post Office (The Dalles, Oregon) =

- U.S. Post Office
- U.S. National Register of Historic Places
- U.S. Historic district – Contributing property
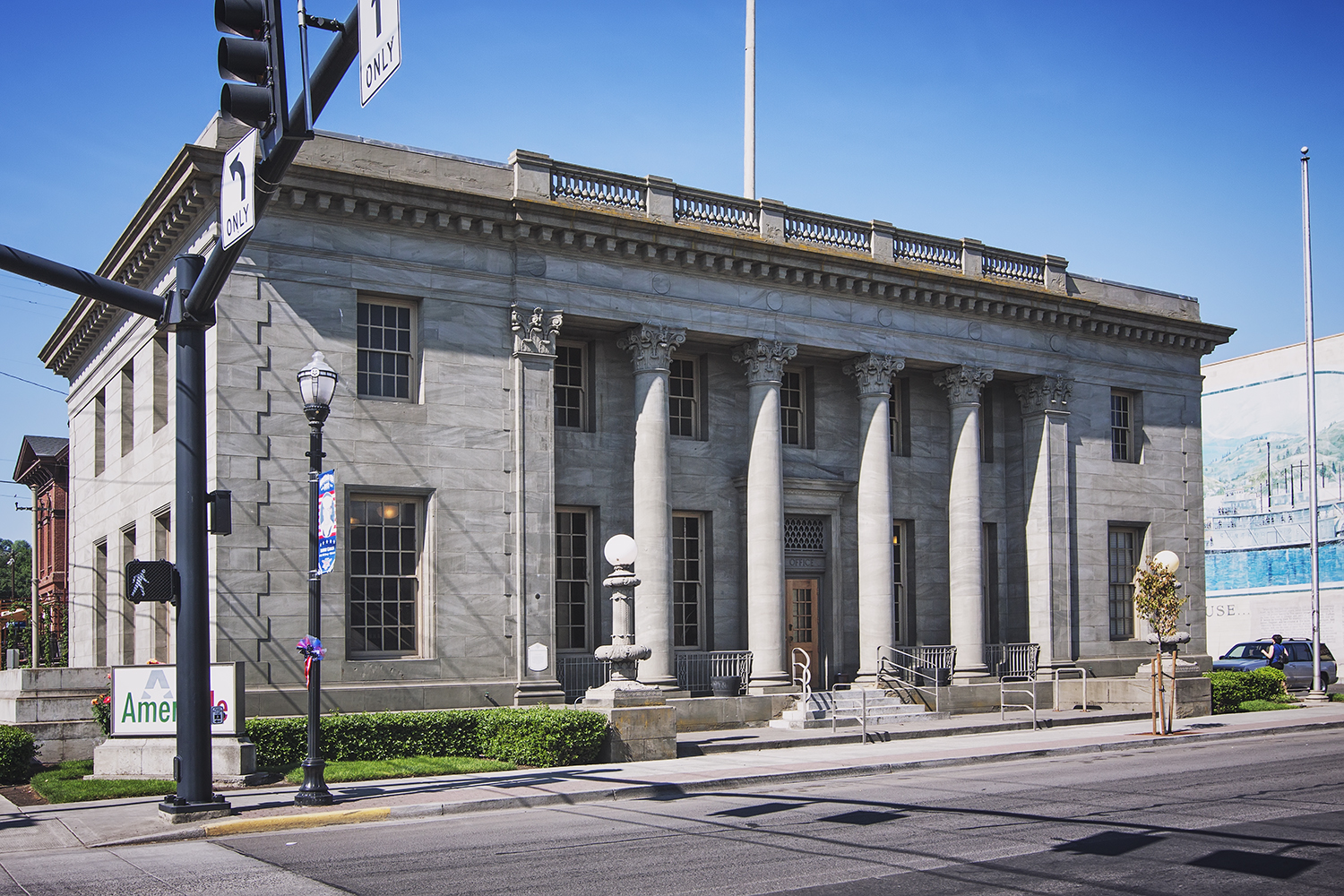

- Location within Oregon Location within the United States
- Interactive map showing the location of U.S. Post Office The Dalles
- Location: 100 W. 2nd Street; The Dalles, Oregon
- Coordinates: 45°36′09″N 121°11′05″W
- Area: 0.33 acres (0.13 ha)
- Built: 1916
- Built by: Campbell Construction Company
- Architect: Oscar Wenderoth, Supervising Architect, U.S. Department of the Treasury
- Architectural style: Neoclassical/Greek Revival
- Part of: The Dalles Commercial Historic District (ID86002953)
- MPS: Significant US Post Offices in Oregon 1900–1941 TR
- NRHP reference No.: 85000545
- Added to NRHP: March 4, 1985

The former United States Post Office in The Dalles, Oregon, United States, is a historic building constructed in 1916. Executed from standardized federal plans in the Greek Revival style, it was the first federal building in The Dalles and one of a set of nine built in Oregon in the 1910s. It remained in operation as a post office longer than seven of the other eight in that group. The building was added to the National Register of Historic Places in 1985.

== See also ==
- National Register of Historic Places listings in Wasco County, Oregon
