= Medical Arts Building (Portland, Oregon) =

Historic building in Portland, Oregon, U.S.

- U.S. National Register of Historic Places
- Portland Historic Landmark
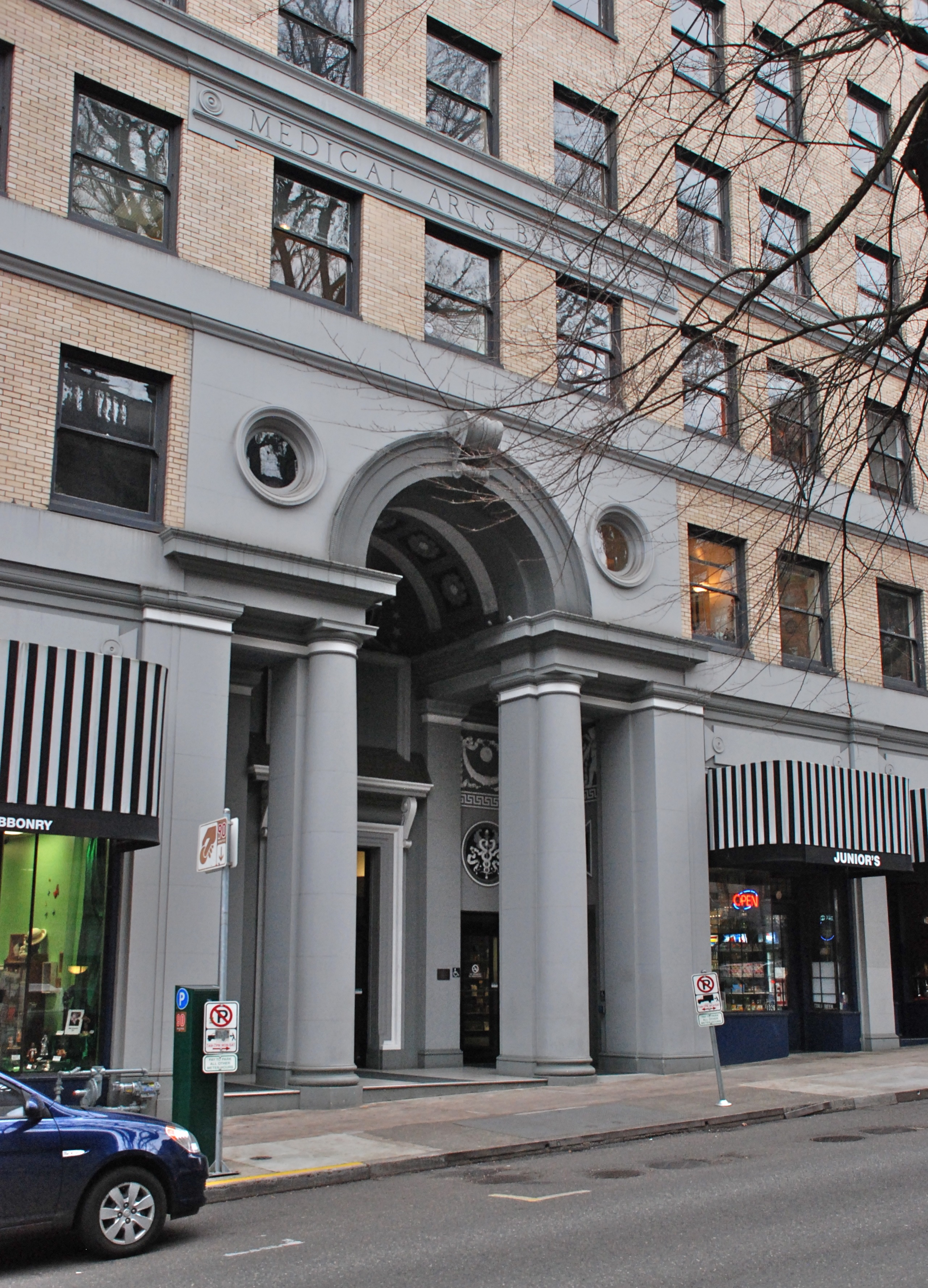
- Medical Arts Building, main entrance, in 2011

- Location within Portland, Oregon
- Location: 1020 SW Taylor Street; Portland, Oregon
- Coordinates: 45°31′07″N 122°41′00″W
- Area: less than one acre
- Built: 1924–25
- Architect: Houghtaling & Dougan
- Architectural style: Late 19th And 20th Century Revivals, Italian Renaissance
- NRHP reference No.: 86002968
- Added to NRHP: November 6, 1986

The Medical Arts Building is a historic building located at 1020 SW Taylor Street in Downtown Portland, Oregon. It was completed in 1925 by the Houghtaling & Dougan architecture firm, and was listed on the National Register of Historic Places on November 6, 1986.

== See also ==
- National Register of Historic Places listings in Southwest Portland, Oregon
