= The Dalles Civic Auditorium =

- U.S. National Register of Historic Places
- U.S. Historic district – Contributing property
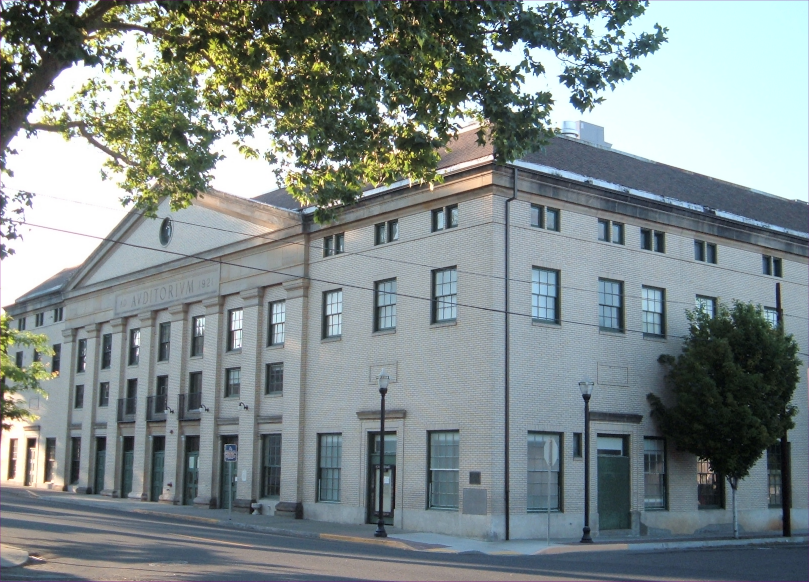
- The Dalles Civic Auditorium in 2006

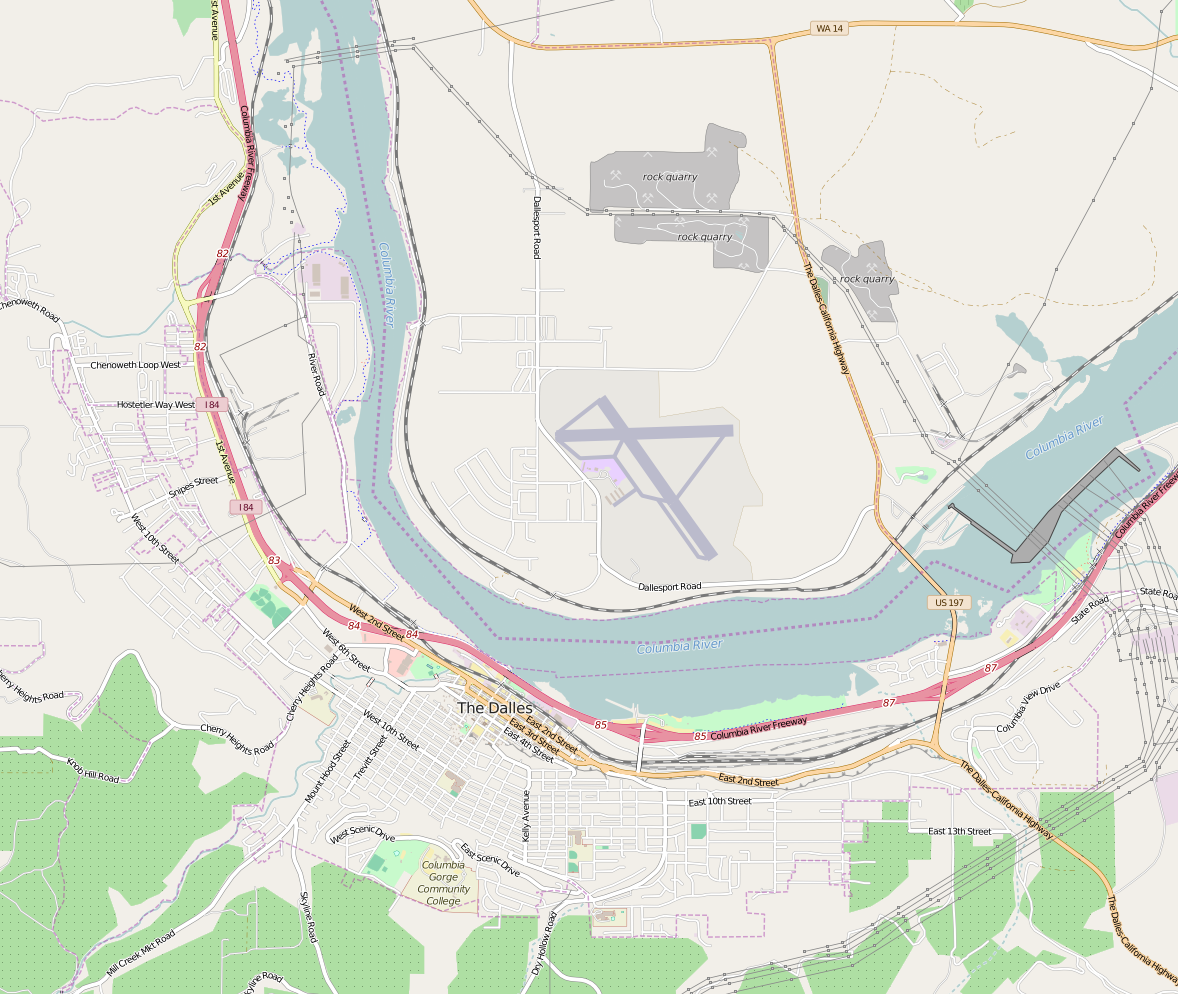
- Location within The Dalles OR Location within Oregon Location within the United States
- Location: E. 4th and Federal Streets; The Dalles, Oregon
- Coordinates: 45°35′59″N 121°10′56″W
- Architect: Houghtaling & Dougan
- Architectural style: Classical Revival
- Part of: The Dalles Commercial Historic District (ID86002953)
- NRHP reference No.: 78002326
- Added to NRHP: December 12, 1978

The Dalles Civic Auditorium is a historic building on the National Register of Historic Places located at the corner of Fourth and Federal streets in The Dalles, Oregon. It is currently owned by the Civic Auditorium Historic Preservation Committee, a non-profit corporation formed specifically for the purpose of purchasing it from the City of The Dalles to save it from scheduled demolition, restore it, and operate it as a local and regional cultural center.

"The Civic," as it is most commonly called, was once an important center of cultural and recreational activity for its community and region, and after more than a decade of dereliction and disuse, has been partially restored with plans in place for complete rehabilitation. The facility is becoming, once again, the site of public and private events.

== Architecture ==
The Civic was designed by the Portland architectural firm of Houghtaling & Dougan, whose work includes the Jeffrey Center Building in Portland, and countless other prominent Oregon buildings, many still standing. The light tan brick building occupies nearly one-quarter of a city block, and is an example of the neoclassical style common to public and governmental buildings of its era, more frequently implemented in stone or concrete block construction.

In addition to its over 1100-seat auditorium proper (or theater), with balcony, which is still at the planning stage for restoration, the building also boasts a grand ballroom with "floating" hardwood floor with its own balcony (or mezzanine), a "fireside room," for meetings, and a gymnasium.

== History ==
The site of the Civic Auditorium was the location of a livery stable which had operated since the 1870s. In 1921, the era of horse and buggy coming to a close, the property was purchased by the city in 1921 from Frank McCullough. Construction began the following year, and upon completion the Civic was dedicated as a memorial to the local veterans of World War I.

During its heyday, it was the venue for local cultural, entertainment, ceremonial, social, and recreational events ranging from concerts and theatricals to high school graduation ceremonies.

In the 1950s and early 1960s, it was operated by the city Parks & Recreation Department, who held indoor recreational activities and "sock hops," referred to as "Rec Dances," in its gymnasium for local youth. Toward the end of that era, the facility had largely fallen into disuse, the auditorium proper having been turned into a professional wrestling arena. It was ultimately condemned for safety reasons.

By the 1970s some initiatives were already beginning to be proposed to the city for its rehabilitation and reopening, but because of budgetary pressures, worsened by local economic conditions, none of these gained approval.

The renovation project currently underway, and as of 2006 approximately 50% accomplished, was one such proposal prepared for consideration by the city in 1984. By 1991, after over 20 years of disuse, the city decided it needed to be relieved of the burden of maintaining a derelict property, and demolition was scheduled. This, despite the building's status as a historical landmark, listed on the National Register of Historic Places in 1978.

The same year, a group of concerned citizens formed the non-profit corporation which raised the funds to purchase the property from the city, and undertook the project privately.

== See also ==
- National Register of Historic Places listings in Wasco County, Oregon
