= Governor Hotel =

The Governor Hotel may refer to:

- The Sentinel Hotel, Portland, Oregon, a two-building hotel which was named The Governor Hotel from 1992 to 2014
- The Seward Hotel, Portland, Oregon, which was named The Governor Hotel from 1931 to 1992 and was the east wing of the Governor Hotel from 1992 to 2014
- The Elks Temple (Portland, Oregon), which was the west wing of the Governor Hotel from 1992 to 2014 and housed the hotel's main entrance from 2004 to 2014
- The Rector Hotel (Seattle, Washington), known as the Governor Hotel from 1931 to about 1942.
