= Seward Hotel =

Historic building in Portland, Oregon, U.S.

- U.S. National Register of Historic Places
- Portland Historic Landmark
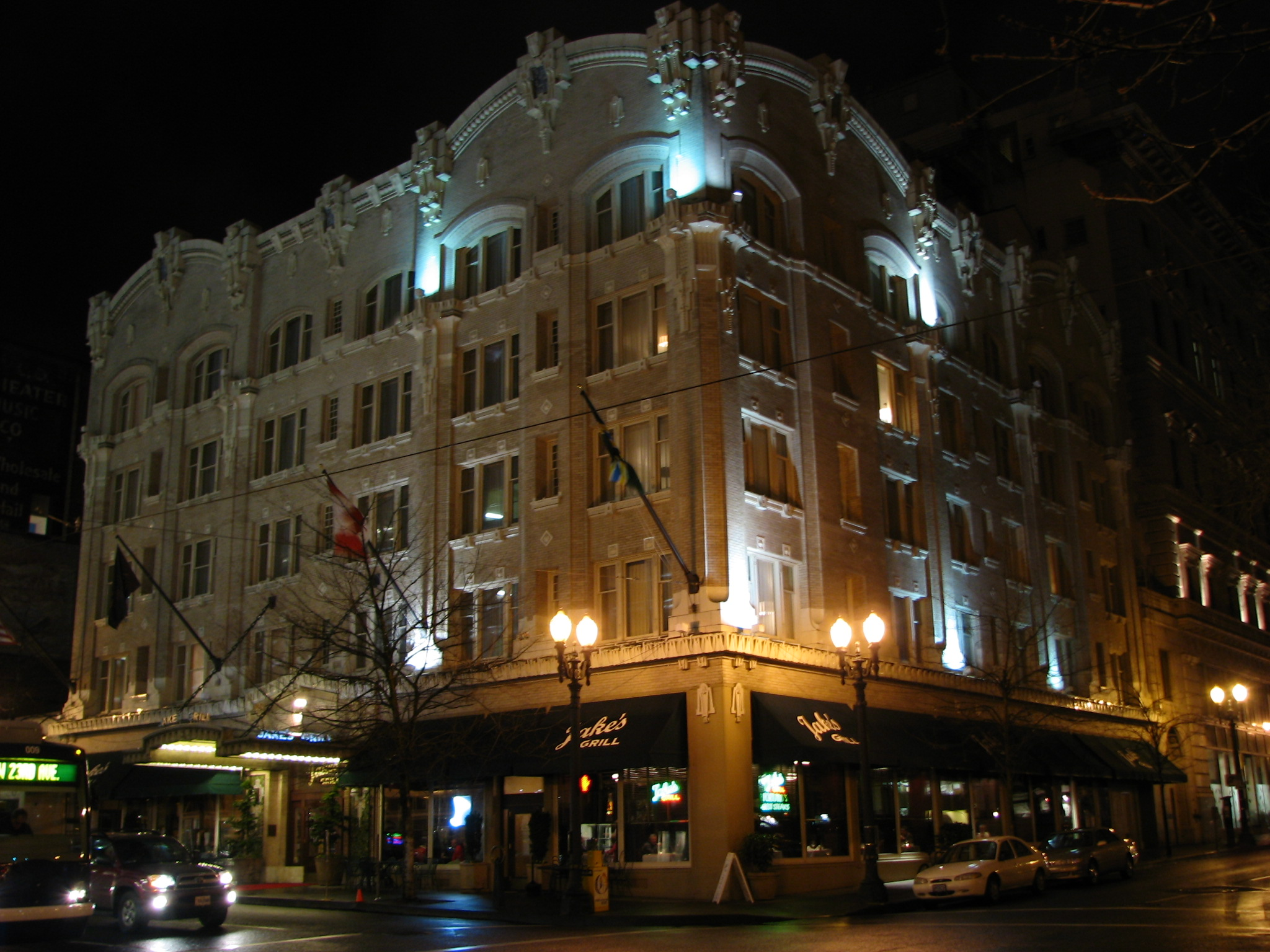
- The former Seward Hotel at night

- Location within Portland, Oregon
- Location: 611–619 SW 10th Avenue; Portland, Oregon
- Coordinates: 45°31′14″N 122°40′56″W
- Built: 1909
- Architect: William C. Knighton
- NRHP reference No.: 85000370
- Added to NRHP: February 28, 1985

The Seward Hotel, also known as the Governor Hotel (east wing), is a historic hotel building in downtown Portland, Oregon, United States, that is listed on the National Register of Historic Places (NRHP). Built in 1909, it is one of two NRHP-listed buildings that make up the Sentinel Hotel, the other being the 1923-built Elks Temple. The Seward was renamed the Governor Hotel in 1931, closed in the mid-1980s, and reopened in 1992 joined with the former Elks building, and thereafter formed the east wing of a two-building hotel.

== History ==
The Seward Hotel was completed in 1909. Its glazed terracotta exterior motif features a blending of Art Nouveau and Native American designs. Its interior architecture is in the arts and crafts style, popular during the period in which it was built. The hotel's architect, William C. Knighton, went on to become the first Oregon State Architect in 1912, and later designed the Oregon State Supreme Court Building.

The hotel's original owner was G. Rosenblatt, but it was named for its proprietor, Walter M. Seward. It included a restaurant in the basement, the Seward Grill, which Mr. Seward also operated until selling it in 1921. The hotel was sold in 1930, and was renamed The Governor Hotel upon reopening in 1931.

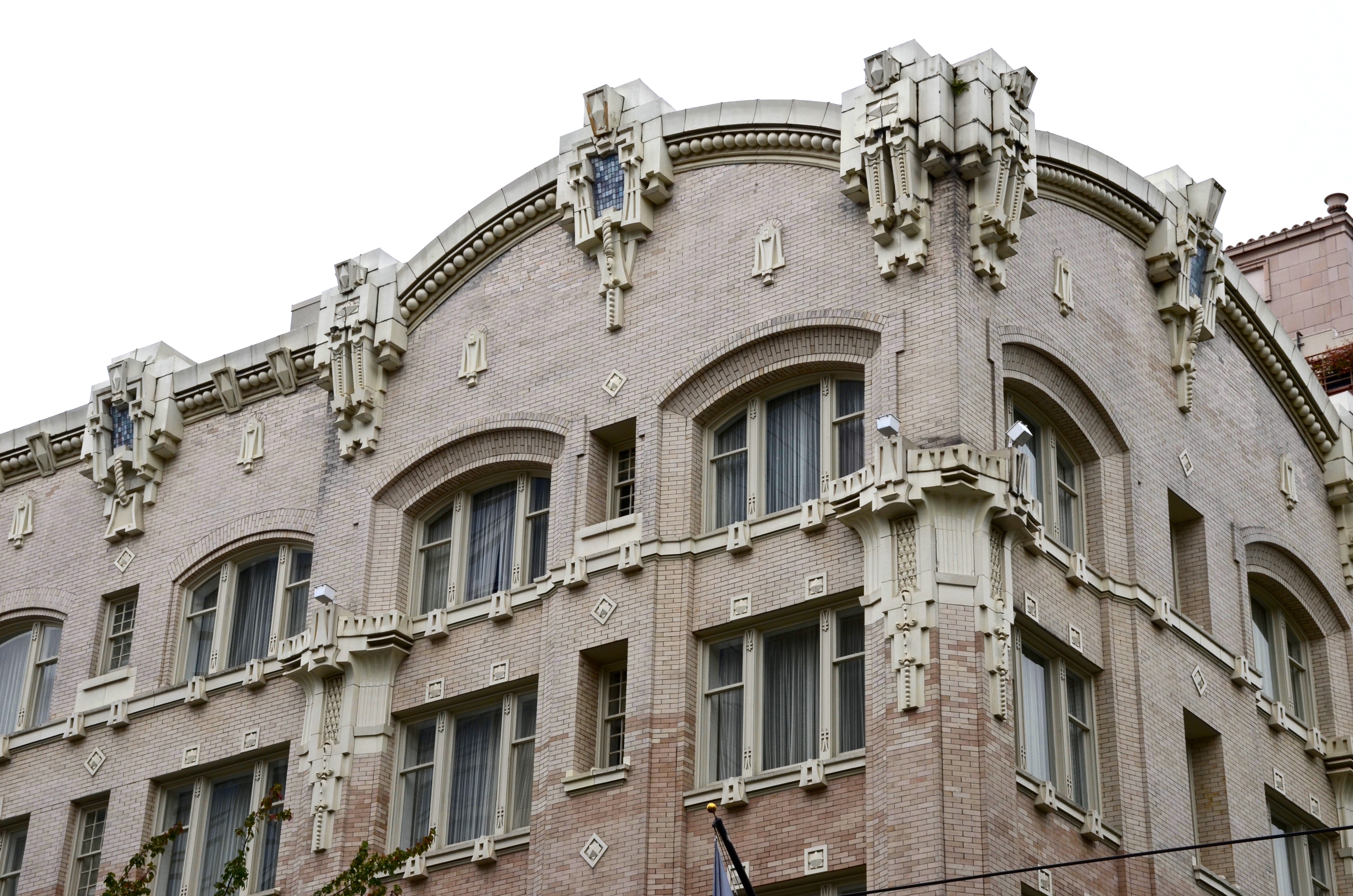
Exterior detail view

Atiyeh Brothers, a rug and carpet retailer, occupied a large space in the ground floor of the Governor Hotel for 38 years, from 1935 to 1973. Alterations made in 1934–1935 when Atiyeh Brothers moved in included moving the lobby to nearer the center of the building. A stained-glass dome hung from the ceiling in the ground-floor corner area that was occupied after 1934 by the office of George and Aziz Atiyeh. When the business moved out in 1973, the approximately 5-by-8-foot (1.5 m × 2.4 m) decorative fixture was dismantled and placed into storage by the Atiyehs. It was reacquired by the hotel in 1992 and restored for reinstallation.

The building was added to the National Register of Historic Places in 1985, as the Seward Hotel, the name it carried between 1909 and 1931.

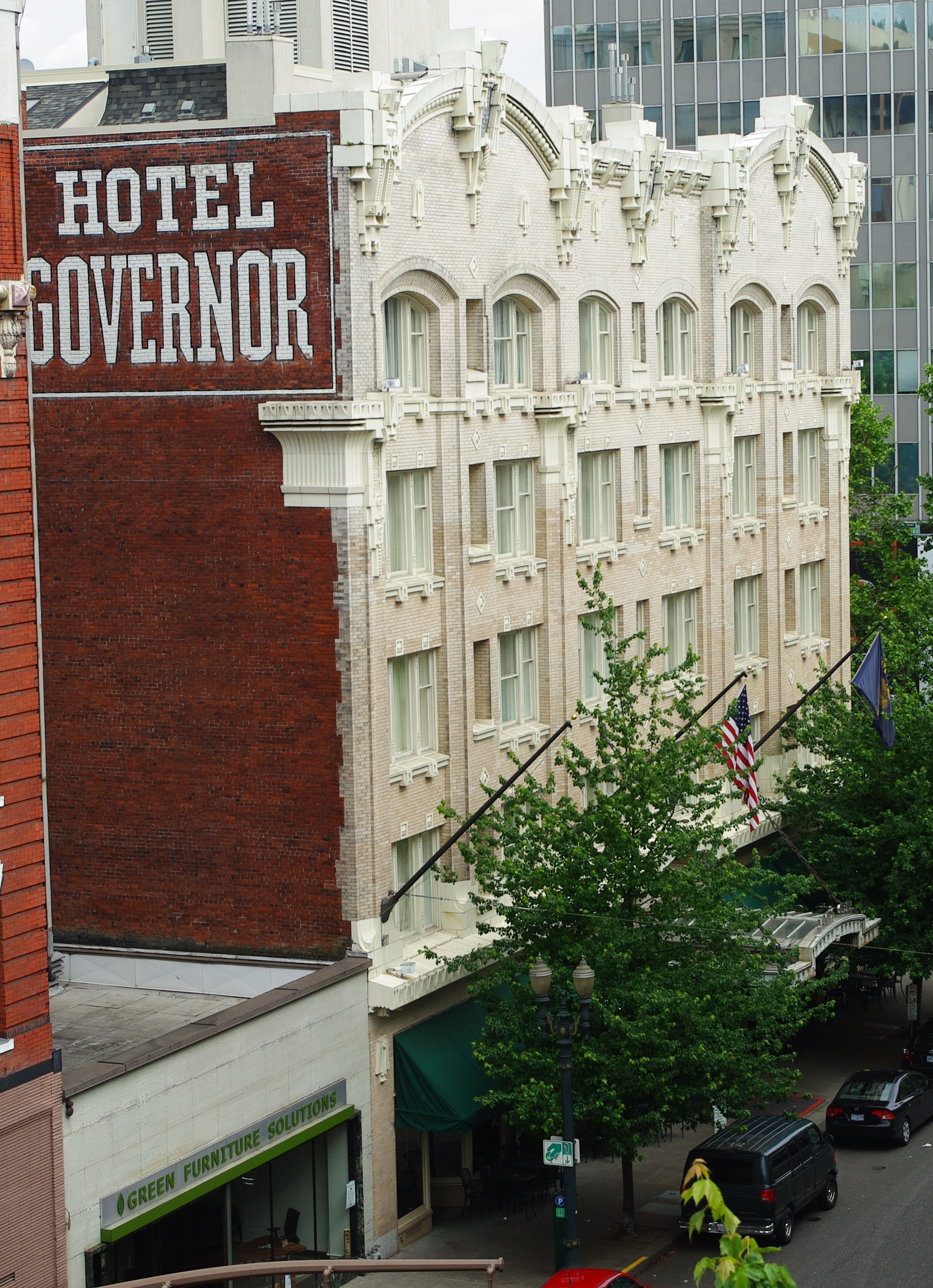
The hotel in 2014

By the mid-1980s, the Governor Hotel had fallen into disrepair and closed, but new owners were planning renovations. Work was under way in 1987, but later stalled because of financing problems.

Renovation work eventually resumed, and was completed in spring 1992. The project included connecting the former Seward Hotel building with the neighboring Princeton Building, which had originally been constructed in 1923 as the Elks Temple and in 1978 had received its own listing on the National Register of Historic Places. In 1994, McCormick & Schmick's opened Jake's Grill in space next to the hotel entrance and lobby, on 10th Avenue.

In 2004, during another round of renovations, a new lobby was created inside the Princeton Building, and its entrance (on SW 11th Avenue) became the main entrance to the Governor Hotel. Jake's Grill then expanded into the former hotel lobby area, on SW 10th Avenue.

The Governor Hotel was sold to Provenance Hotels^{fr} in 2012 and renovated, and in 2014 it was renamed the Sentinel Hotel.

== See also ==
- Architecture in Portland, Oregon
- Governor Hotel (disambiguation)
- National Register of Historic Places listings in Southwest Portland, Oregon
