= Victoria Bar =

Bar and restaurant in Portland, Oregon, U.S.

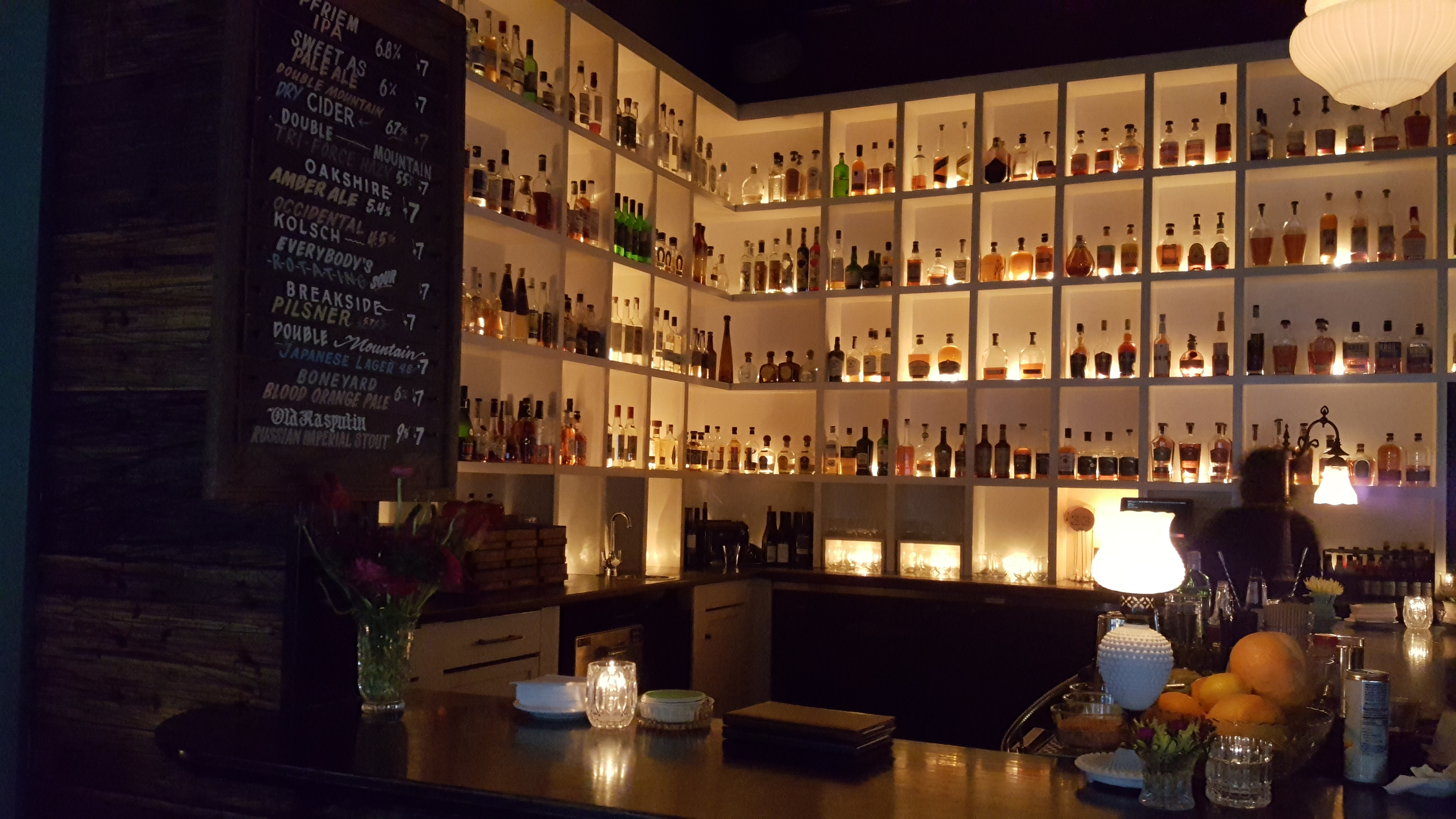
- The bar's interior, 2022
- Interactive map of Victoria Bar

Restaurant information
- Established: 2015
- Owner: Lightning Bar Collective
- Location: 4835 North Albina Avenue, Portland, Multnomah, Oregon, 97217, United States
- Coordinates: 45.5580°N 122.6751°W
- Website: victoriapdx.com

Victoria Bar is a bar and restaurant in Portland, Oregon.

== Description ==
Named after cocktailer Lisa Hare (middle name), Victoria Bar is a 5,000 square foot bar in the north Portland part of the Humboldt neighborhood. The interior has backlit shelves, hobnail lamps, wooden benches, and a "hulking" painting of the RMS Lusitania. Cocktail names are inspired by the film The Princess Bride. The bar's most popular cocktail is the Florin, which has gin, strawberry, basil, lime, and soda water.

== History ==
Owned by the Lightning Bar Collective (Bye and Bye, Jackknife Bar, Sweet Hereafter), Victoria Bar opened in 2015. Russell Van der Genugten was the chef, as of 2016. The bar hosted a Puppy Bowl watch party in 2020.

== Reception ==
In 2015, Victoria Bar ranked second on The Oregonian's list of the city's best new bars, and the bar was nominated in the Stone Cold Stunner category at Eater Portland's Eater Awards. Victoria Bar ranked third in the Best New Bar category in Willamette Week's annual readers' poll in 2016. Thrillist's Alex Frane included Victoria Bar in a 2018 list of "The Best Bars to Drink with Your Dog in Portland".

In 2021, Portland Monthly's Katherine Chew Hamilton included the bar in a list of "Our Favorite Patios for Drinking & Soaking Up Sun", and Willamette Week included Victoria Bar in a list of "Our Favorite Portland Patios for Dates". Eater Portland's Michelle DeVona and Brooke Jackson-Glidden included Victoria Bar in a 2021 list of "13 Dynamite Dog-Friendly Bars and Restaurants in Portland".
