= Bye and Bye (bar) =

Bar and restaurant in Portland, Oregon, U.S.

Coordinates: 45°33′33″N 122°39′19″W

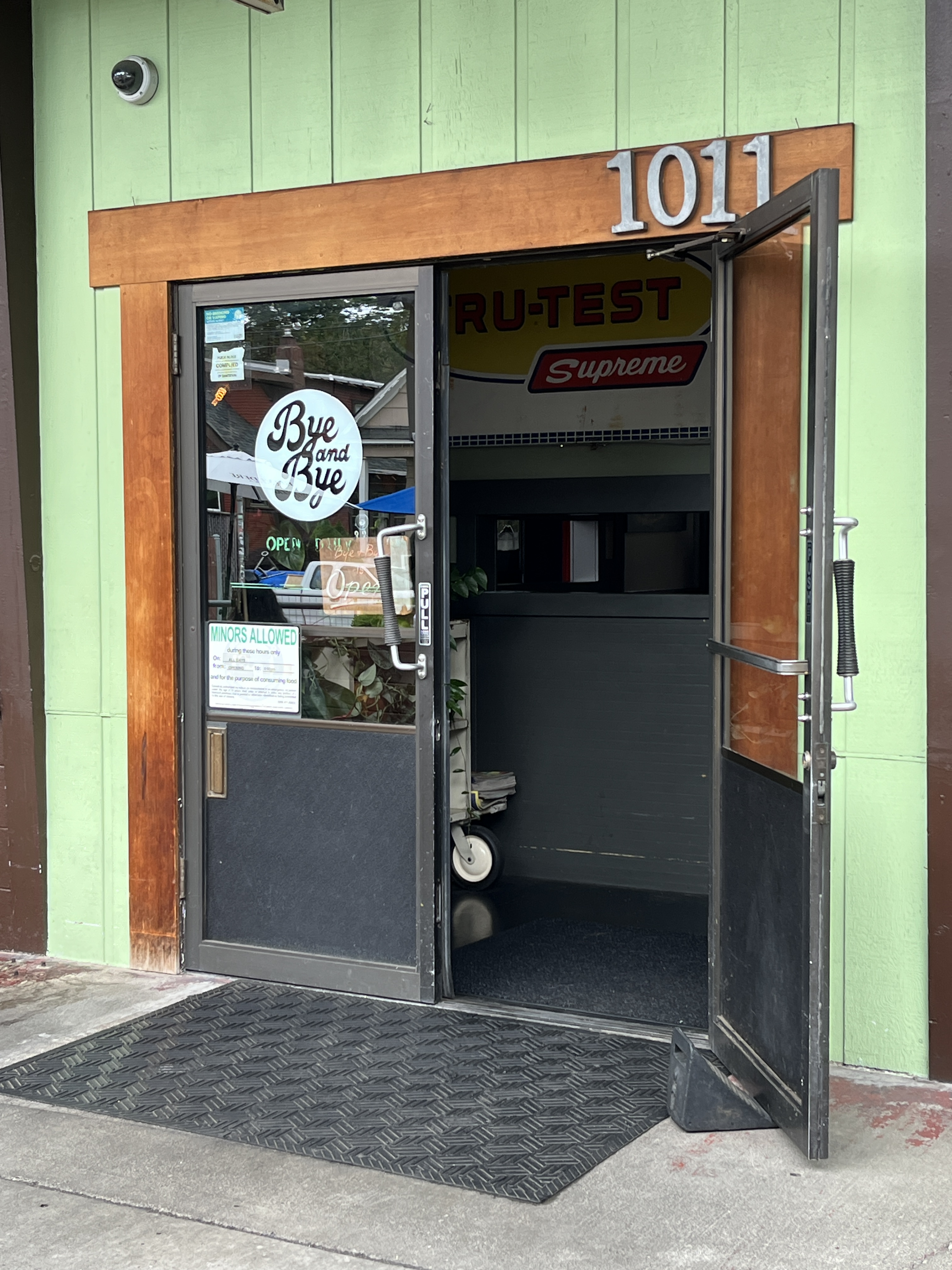
- Interactive map of Bye and Bye

Restaurant information
- Location: 1011 Northeast Alberta Street, Portland, Multnomah, Oregon, 97211, United States
- Website: thebyeandbye.com

Bye and Bye is a vegan bar in Portland, Oregon, United States.

== Description ==
Bye and Bye is a bar on Northeast Alberta Street in Portland's King neighborhood. It has two large patios and serves brunch on weekends. The vegan menu has included a "meatball" sub, an "Eastern" bowl, grilled cheese, spaghetti, chili pie, pretzel knots, and chips and salsa. Bye and Bye serves beer, cider, cocktails, and wine. The bar's signature drink has peach vodka, peach bourbon, lemon, cranberry, and soda.

== History ==
The bar was opened by John Janulis, Liam Duffy, Ben Hufford, Ian David, Clyde Wooten and Jacob Carey of the Lightning Bar Collective (Jackknife Bar, Sweet Hereafter, Victoria Bar).

The vegan pop-up restaurant Feral launched from Bye and Bye in 2022.

== Reception ==
Laurie Wolf called the food "tasty" and "satisfying". Lizzy Acker ranked Bye and Bye eighth in The Oregonian's 2018 overview of nine places for non-alcoholic drinks in Portland. Alex Frane included the signature drink in Eater Portland's 2019 list of the city's fifteen "most iconic cocktails". Brenna Houck included Bye and Bye in the website's 2025 list of Portland's eighteen best vegan and vegetarian restaurants.

In 2023, VegNews readers named Bye and Bye the best vegan bar. The business was included in a Yelp list of Portland's ten best vegan eateries in 2025.
