= Auto Freight Transport Building of Oregon and Washington =

Historic building in Portland, Oregon, U.S.

- U.S. National Register of Historic Places
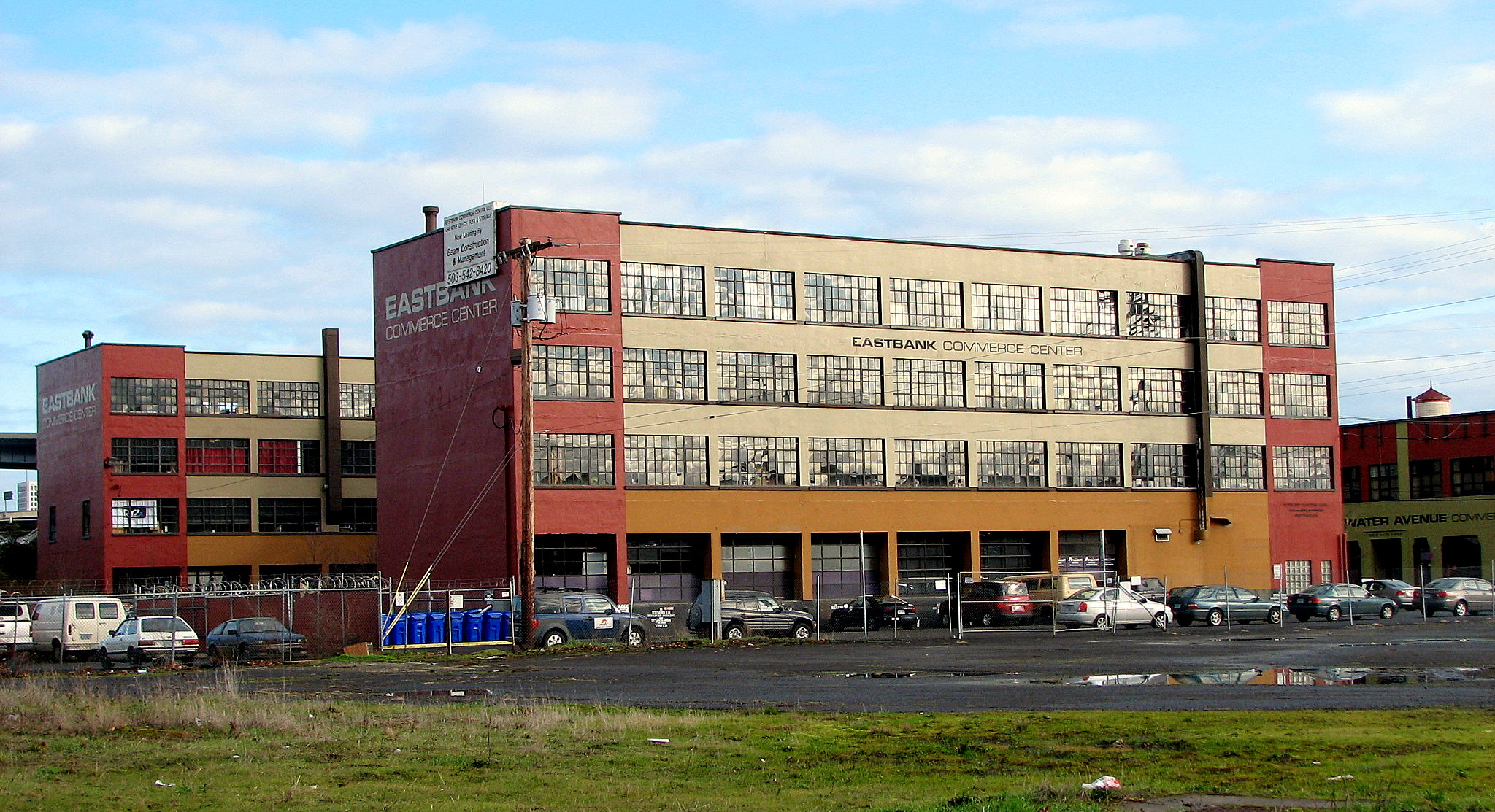
- Auto Freight Transport Building in 2010
- Location: 1001 SE Water Avenue; Portland, Oregon
- Coordinates: 45°30′56″N 122°39′58″W
- Area: 0.85 acres (0.34 ha)
- Built: 1924
- Architect: Houghtaling and Dougan
- NRHP reference No.: 05000641
- Added to NRHP: June 30, 2005

The Auto Freight Transport Building of Oregon and Washington, also known as East Side Terminal and Eastbank Commerce Center, in southeast Portland in the U.S. state of Oregon is a four-story commercial structure listed on the National Register of Historic Places. Built in 1924, it was added to the register in 2005.

Occupying an entire block of the Central Eastside Industrial District, the 64,892-square-foot (6,028.7 m^{2}), U-shaped structure has a flat roof, large industrial windows, and a plain interior with concrete floors and walls. The original building, an open warehouse with a few offices on the second floor, has since been divided into spaces for light industry, business, and office work.

The original building was part of an industrial complex that developed on the east bank of the Willamette River in the early 20th century. As Portland grew, freight shipments delivered to receiving stations on the river's west side were slowed by heavy traffic on the city's bridges and in the central downtown. Pressure from business owners and civic groups over two decades led to construction of a central eastside receiving station, the Auto Freight Transport Building. The building, served by huge river docks located about 100 feet (30 m) to the west and by rail lines and surface streets, was capable of handling and storing a wide variety of cargo for transhipment to its ultimate destination. In addition, many small freight companies used it for office and lounge space for their employees.

The Auto Freight Transportation Association of Oregon and Washington, a group of small trucking companies, operated the terminal jointly until 1938, when the group changed its name to East Side Terminal, Inc., and moved to another building in the Central Eastside Industrial District. Subsequently, the building became a warehouse used by a variety of freight companies.

The Auto Freight Transport Building had a small built-in service station. However, around 1930 an adjunct building called the Auto Freight Terminal Service Station, across Southeast Water Avenue, was constructed to provide fuel and mechanical repairs to vehicles using the Transport Building. It continued to function as a service station until the early 1940s.

In 1964, relocation of Interstate 5 from the west bank of the Willamette to the east led to removal of the docks and other waterfront structures of the industrial district and demolition of many old industrial buildings. The Auto Freight Transport Building is the best-preserved historic waterfront building in the 680-acre (280 ha) district.

== See also ==
- National Register of Historic Places listings in Southeast Portland, Oregon
