= Jake's Grill =

Restaurant in Portland, Oregon, U.S.

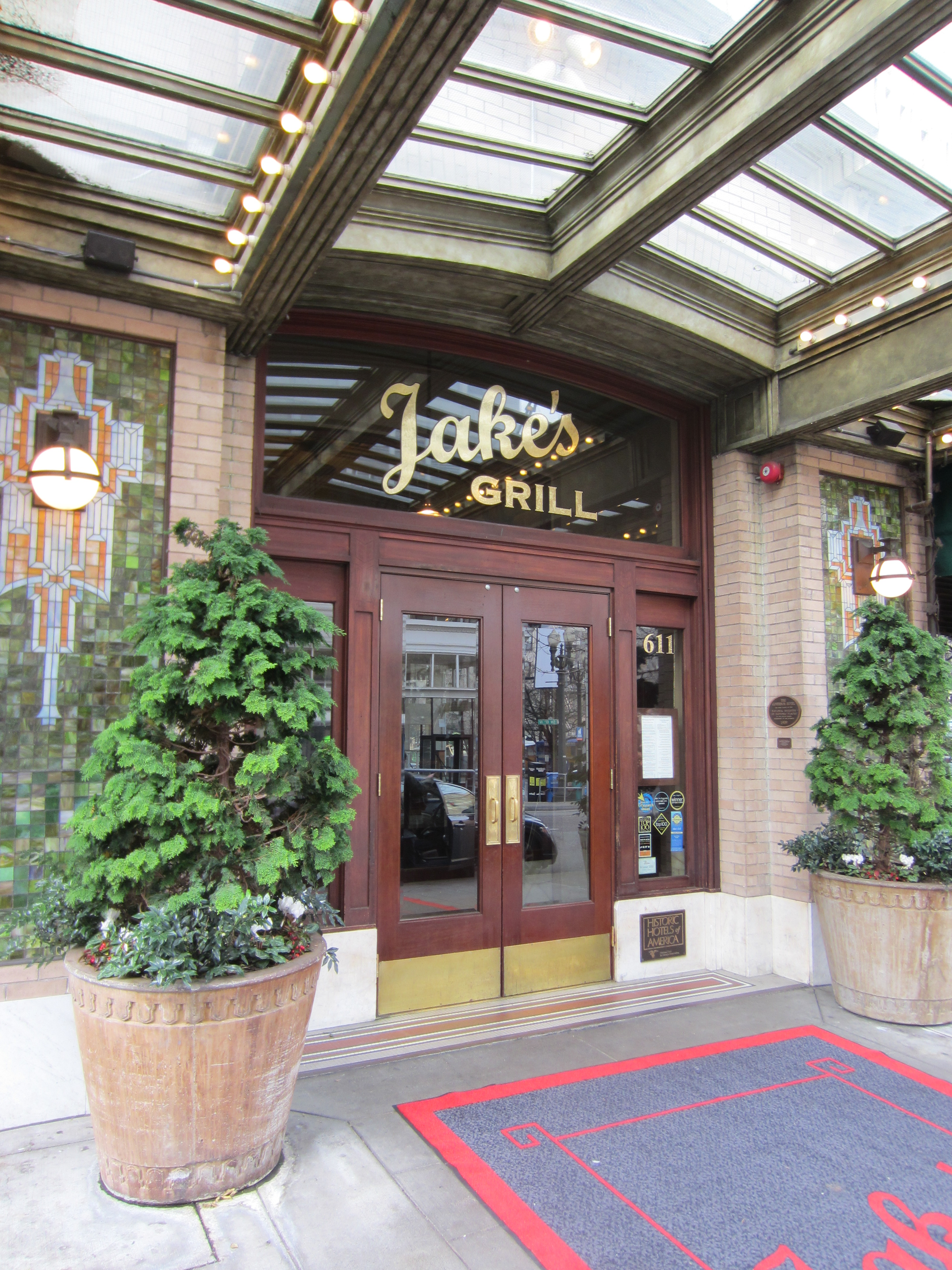
- The restaurant's entrance, 2012
- Interactive map of Jake's Grill

Restaurant information
- Established: 1994
- Location: Portland, Oregon, United States
- Coordinates: 45.5206°N 122.6823°W
- Website: jakesgrill.com

Jake's Grill is a restaurant in Portland, Oregon.

== Description ==
Jake's Grill is a steakhouse in downtown Portland's Seward Hotel. The menu features steak and seafood, including cedar plank salmon. Surf and turf and happy hour are also offered. The restaurant's interior features dark woodwork and stuffed animal heads.

Jake's Grill has been described as a "sibling" restaurant to Jake's Famous Crawfish.

== History ==
The restaurant opened in 1994. In 2014, a man sued the restaurant after being diagnosed with food poisoning.

== Reception ==
In 2021, Eater Portland's Jenni Moore and Krista Garcia included Jake's Grill in the lists "12 Stellar Portland Seafood Restaurants" and "Nine Steakhouses to Try in Portland and Beyond", respectively.
