= Houghtaling & Dougan =

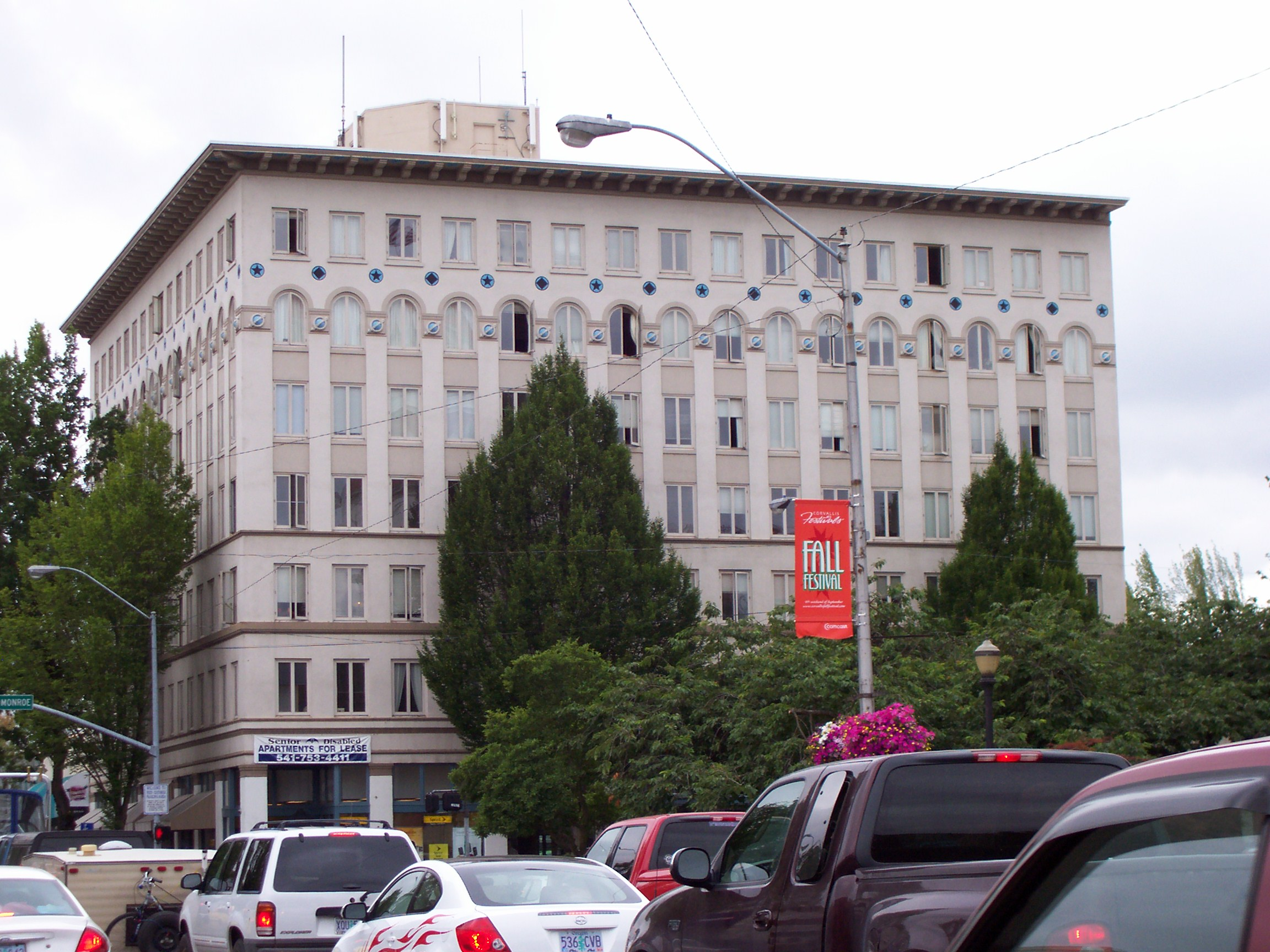
Hotel Benton

Houghtaling & Dougan was an American architectural firm based in Oregon. It was a partnership of Chester A. Houghtaling (October 27, 1882 – March 31, 1940) and Luther Lee Dougan (July 28, 1883 – October 9, 1983). A number of their works are listed on the U.S. National Register of Historic Places (NRHP).

== History ==
The partnership existed from 1914 to 1925 "and by 1921 had become a well patronized and respected firm as a result of their excellent work and reliable dealings." Chester Houghtaling was born in Cleveland, Ohio and studied at the Lewis Institute of Chicago. Among his experiences, he worked for three years for Cutter and Malmgren in Spokane, Washington, and opened his own office in 1913 in Portland, Oregon.

Dougan studied architecture at the Armour Institute of Technology in Chicago, but withdrew before completing a degree. He arrived in Portland in 1911. He designed a number of buildings after his partnership with Houghtaling. "Dougan gained a reputation for his authoritative scholarship, which enabled him to draw upon the classical styles for usage in large design and ornamentation which is evident in the Old Elks Temple." He was "well into his 80s" when he retired.

== Works on NRHP ==
Houghtaling & Dougan

- Auto Freight Transport Building of Oregon and Washington, 1001 SE Water Ave, Portland
- Elks Temple, 614 SW 11th Ave, Portland
- Jones Cash Store, 111 SE Belmont St, Portland
- Hotel Benton, 408 SW Monroe, Corvallis
- Marshfield Hotel, 275 Broadway, Coos Bay
- Medical Arts Building, 1020 SW Taylor, Portland
- The Dalles Civic Auditorium, East 4th and Federal streets, The Dalles
- Washington High School (1924), Portland
- Washington Park Comfort Station (1925), Portland

Dougan

- Virgil and Beulah Crum House, 4438 NE Alameda St, Portland
- Old First National Bank Building (1926–27), 388 State St NE, Salem

Houghtaling

- Oregon State Bank Building, 4200 NE Sandy Blvd, Portland

== Other works by Dougan ==
- Medical Dental Building, Portland
- Monastery at the Sanctuary of Our Sorrowful Mother, Portland
- Oregon State Tuberculosis Hospital, Salem
- Studio Building (1927), Portland
