= Sweet Hereafter (bar) =

Bar and restaurant in Portland, Oregon, U.S.

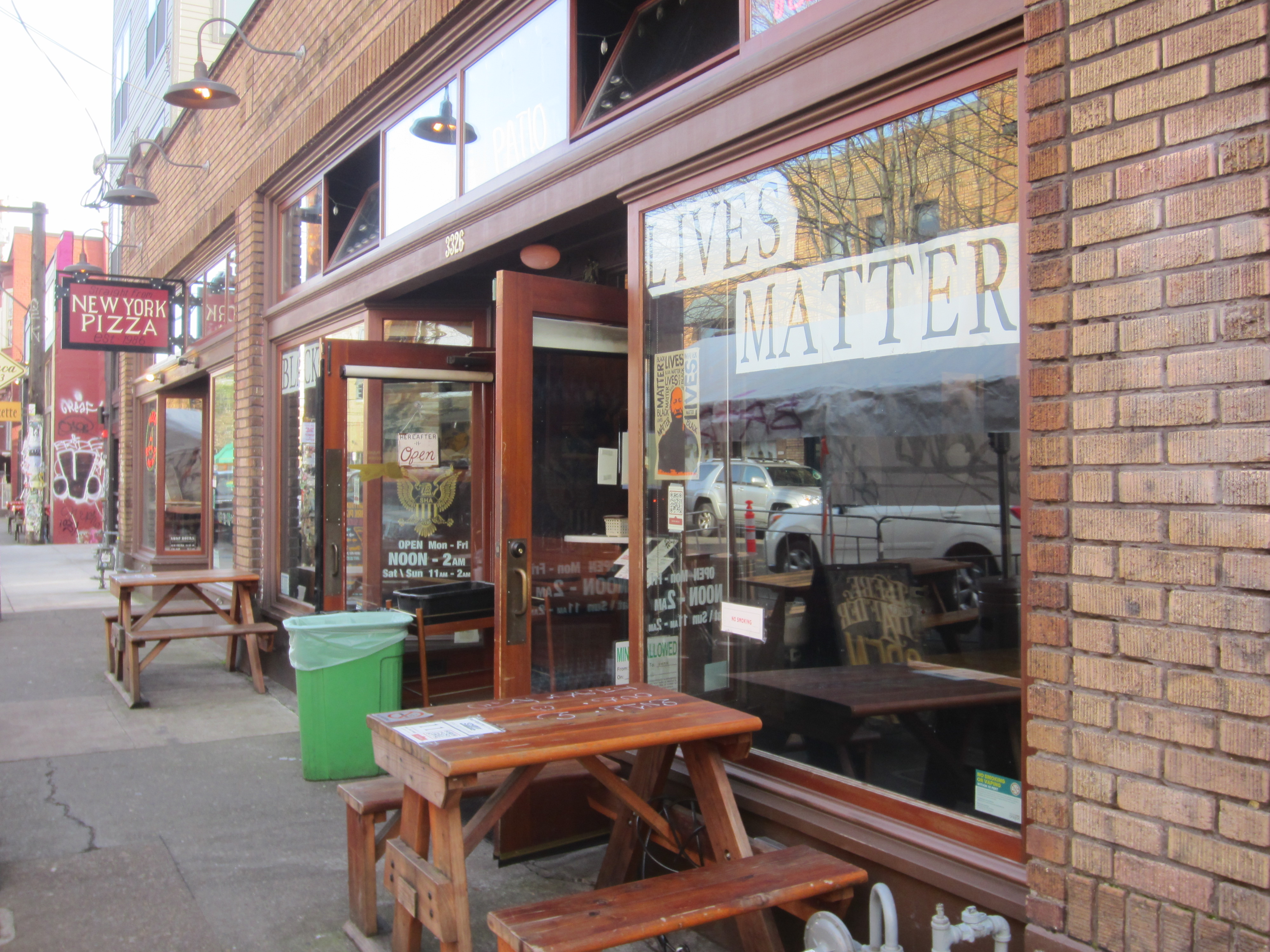
- The bar's front entrance, 2021
- Interactive map of Sweet Hereafter

Restaurant information
- Established: July 26, 2011
- Owners: Lightning Bar Collective: Jacob Carey; Ian David; Liam Duffy; Ben Hufford; John Janulis; Clyde Wooten
- Location: 3326 Southeast Belmont Street, Portland, Multnomah, Oregon, 97214, United States
- Coordinates: 45.5163°N 122.6303°W
- Website: hereafterpdx.com

The Sweet Hereafter was a bar and restaurant in Portland, Oregon, United States. It closed on February 29, 2024.

== Description ==
The Sweet Hereafter operated in a former Dixie Mattress Co. building on Belmont Street in southeast Portland's Sunnyside neighborhood. The small menu included vegan rice bowls with jerk tofu and coconut kale, vegan and vegetarian sandwiches, as well as cocktails served in Mason jars. The bar's eponymous drink had vodka, bourbon, lemon, and iced tea. The Sweet Hereafter had a "prohibition vibe", according to Michael Russell of The Oregonian, as well as a covered patio.

== History ==
Partners Jacob Carey, Ian David, Liam Duffy, Ben Hufford, John Janulis, and Clyde Wooten opened the Sweet Hereafter on July 26, 2011, via the Lightning Bar Collective (Bye and Bye, Jackknife Bar, Victoria Bar).

In February 2024, the bar announced plans to close permanently on February 29. A closing announcement read: "We lost one of our founders, navigated COVID and weathered many other challenges. We’re forever indebted to our amazing staff, both past and present. Without them we would not have been able to last as long as we did. We are so extremely grateful to have been part of this community for so long." The business was replaced by Bar Loon, of which Duffy is a "small-percentage" owner.

== Reception ==
Grant Butler included the restaurant's tofu banh mi sandwich in The Oregonian's 2012 list of "Portland's top 10 vegan dishes".
