= Alice French House =

Alice French House may refer to:

- Alice French House (Clover Bend, Arkansas), formerly listed on the National Register of Historic Places (NRHP) in Lawrence County
- Alice French House (Davenport, Iowa), NRHP-listed, in Scott County

== See also ==
- French House (disambiguation)
