= John L. Thompson House =

Historic house in Oregon, United States

- U.S. National Register of Historic Places
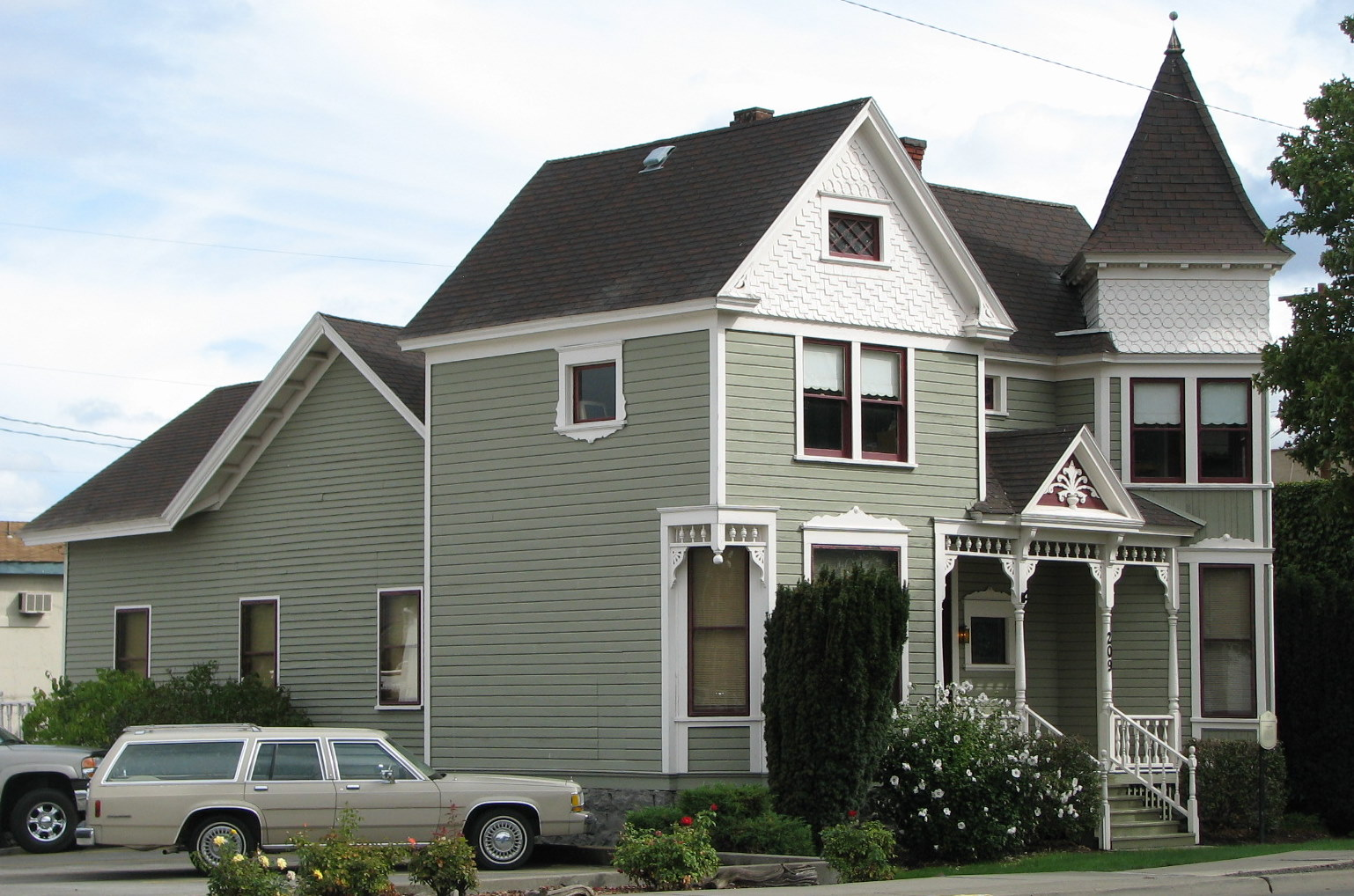
- The Thompson House in 2008

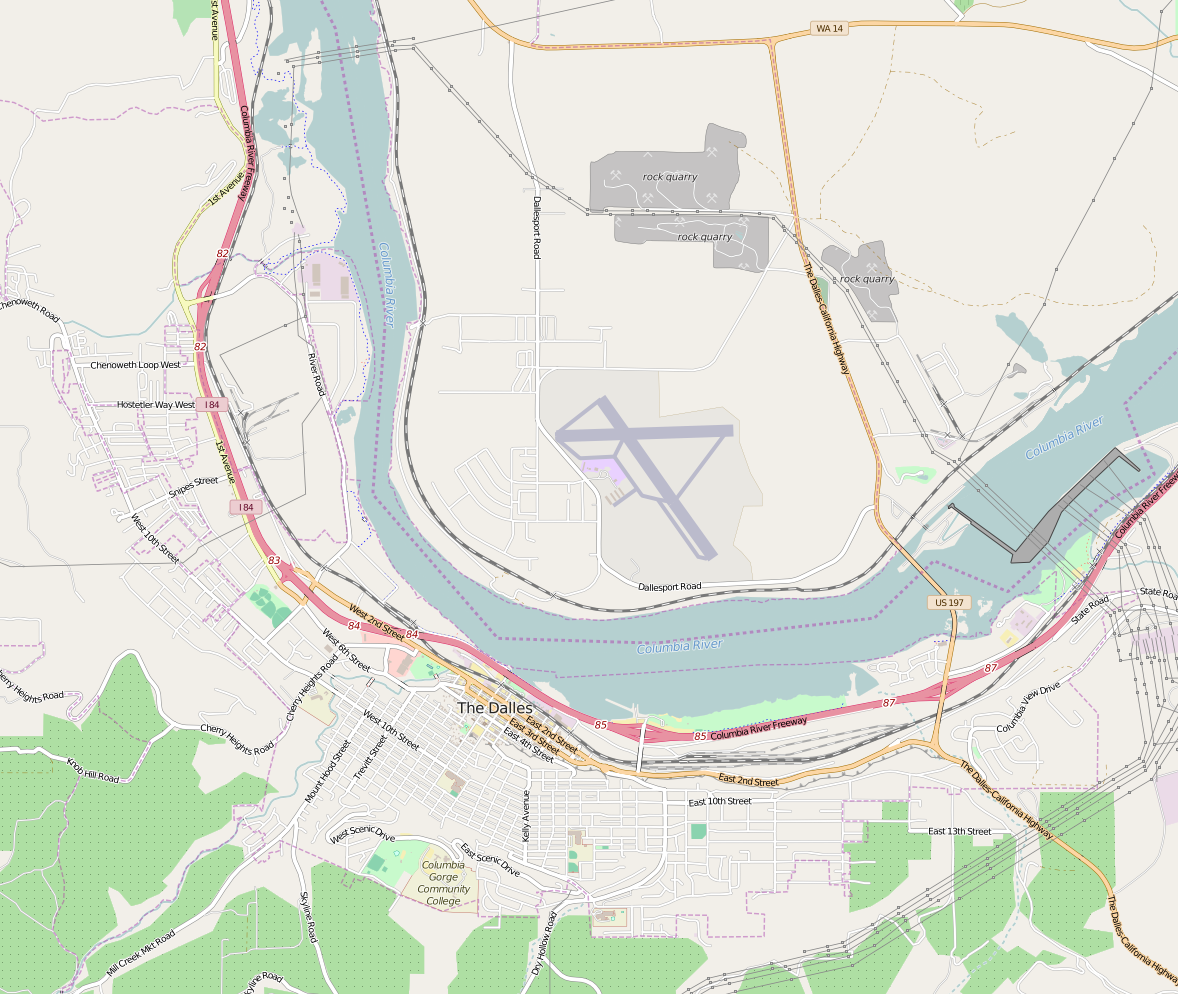
- Location within The Dalles OR
- Location: 209 W. 3rd Street; The Dalles, Oregon
- Coordinates: 45°36′10″N 121°11′11″W
- Area: Less than 1 acre (0.40 ha)
- Built: 1889, expanded 1897
- Architectural style: Queen Anne
- NRHP reference No.: 80003390
- Added to NRHP: November 6, 1980

The John L. Thompson House is a historic house in The Dalles, Oregon, United States. John L. Thompson, an American emigrant and successful blacksmith, built his house in 1889 in a simple, one-story vernacular style. Subsequently, in 1897, the house underwent a significant expansion to become a prominent Queen Anne residence. The house represents the evolution of architecture in frontier towns, and is one of The Dalles' outstanding examples of the Queen Anne style. It was converted to professional offices in 1979.

The house was added to the National Register of Historic Places in 1980.

== See also ==
- National Register of Historic Places listings in Wasco County, Oregon
- Bennett–Williams House
- Hugh Glenn House
- Joseph D. and Margaret Kelly House
