= French House (disambiguation) =

French house is a type of music.

French House or The French House may refer to:

== United Kingdom ==
- The French House, Soho, London

== United States ==
- Looney–French House, Dalton, Arkansas, listed on the National Register of Historic Places (NRHP) in Randolph County
- French–England House, Little Rock, Arkansas, listed on the NRHP in Pulaski County
- Seth French House, Orange City, Florida, listed on the NRHP in Volusia County
- Henry French House, Jeffersonville, Indiana, listed on the NRHP in Indiana
- Alice French House (Davenport, Iowa), listed on the NRHP in Scott County
- The French House (Baton Rouge, Louisiana), listed on the NRHP in East Baton Rouge Parish
- Pillsbury–French House, Andover, Massachusetts, listed on the NRHP in Essex County
- Holyoke–French House, Boxford, Massachusetts, listed on the NRHP in Essex County
- Valentine–French House, Fall River, Massachusetts, listed on the NRHP in Bristol County
- French–Andrews House, Topsfield, Massachusetts, listed on the NRHP in Essex County
- Edward French House, The Dalles, Oregon, listed on the NRHP in Wasco County
- Col. William Henderson French House, Athens, West Virginia, listed on the NRHP in Mercer County
- Teter Myers French House, Hedgesville, West Virginia, listed on the NRHP in Berkeley County
- Porter–French House, Orange, California, listed on the NRHP in Orange County
- The French House, a student residence at Wesleyan University, Middletown, Connecticut
- The French House, Vincennes, Indiana, see List of the oldest buildings in Indiana
- Charles & Elizabeth Haskell French House, Lawrence, Kansas, listed on the NRHP in Douglas County
- Simon French House, Hensleytown, Kentucky, listed on the NRHP in Christian County
- Adams–French House, Aberdeen, Mississippi, listed on the NRHP in Monroe County
- Thomas French Jr. House, Moorestown, New Jersey, listed on the NRHP in Burlington County
- The French House at New York University, a cultural and events center, New York City
- Garnet B. French House, Canton, Ohio, listed on the NRHP in Stark County
- French–Parks House, Tahlequah, Oklahoma, listed on the NRHP in Cherokee County
- French House, Austin, Texas, a cooperative house administered by University of Texas Inter-Cooperative Council
- The French House at the University of Virginia, a student residence, Charlottesville, Virginia
- The French House at the University of Wisconsin–Madison, a student residence and cultural center

== See also ==
- Public housing in France
