= Davenport Group =

- Clockwise from top right: Glaspell; Cook; Dell; Ficke

The Davenport Group is the informal name of a nationally known group of early modernist writers who first came together in Davenport, Iowa. In the early 20th century, they migrated east to New York City to assume leading roles in several important artistic and cultural developments in the 1910s and 1920s. Core members of the group are Susan Glaspell, her husband George Cram Cook, who were among the founders of the Provincetown Players; Floyd Dell, and Arthur Davison Ficke. Other Davenport writers associated with the group include Alice French, Charles Eugene Banks, Nilla Cram Cook (daughter of Cook), and Harry Hansen.

== Background ==
In the last decades of the nineteenth century, Davenport was a prosperous and cosmopolitan port city on the upper Mississippi River and center of trade. By 1890 local author Alice French had become the first Iowa writer with a national reputation. In the mid-1890s writer Charles Eugene Banks moved to Davenport from Chicago, and started a weekly newspaper devoted to literature and local social life. Over the next decade Banks would mentor several young local aspiring writers (Susan Glaspell, George Cram Cook, and Floyd Dell) who would constitute the Davenport group. Though inspired and influenced by French's success, the socially progressive younger writers rejected her starkly conservative views.

As the young writers began to find success publishing their works, they left Davenport to advance their careers in Chicago and New York. Glaspell and Cook had married before going to New York. Together they had a daughter, Nilla Cram Cook, and son, Harl Cook. Nilla later became a writer.

George "Jig" Cram Cook led the founding of the Provincetown Players in the summer of 1915. Considered the first modern American theatre company, it was famed for producing the first plays of Eugene O'Neill. In addition to participating in the theater, Glaspell became "one of America's most widely read novelists", and she won a Pulitzer Prize in 1931 for one of her plays, Alison's House. In addition, her short stories were regularly published in the top periodicals.

Dell became a best-selling novelist and leading critic and editor; he is known for influencing many major American writers of the first half of the 20th century. Arthur Davison Ficke stayed in Davenport longer, becoming a lawyer in his father's firm. While practicing law, he still established himself as a nationally appreciated poet. He eventually quit law and followed his friends to New York to focus on writing.

== Locations ==
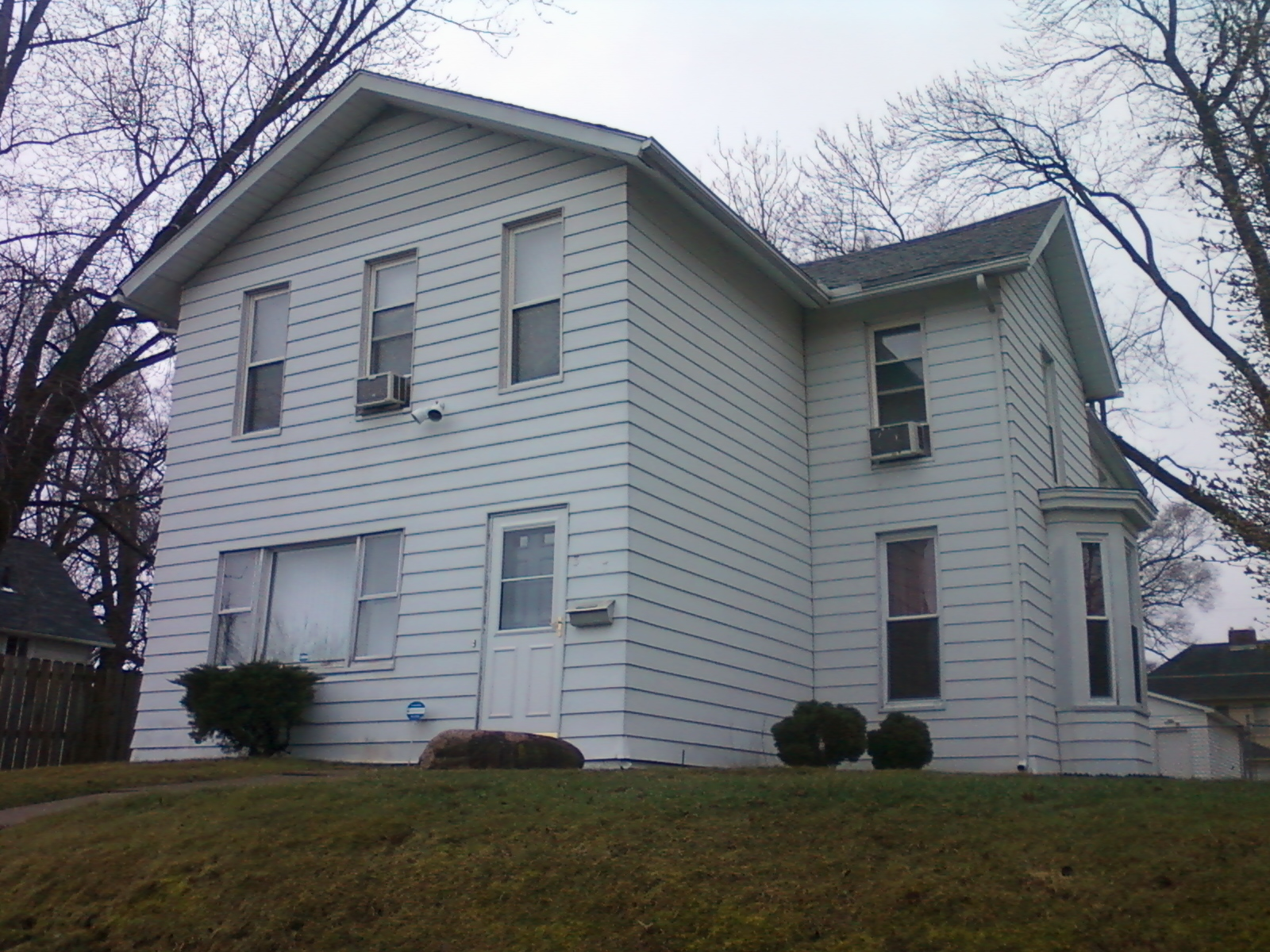
317 E 12th St: Susan Glaspell home.

NW corner of 6th & Brady St: George Cram Cook boyhood home (razed).

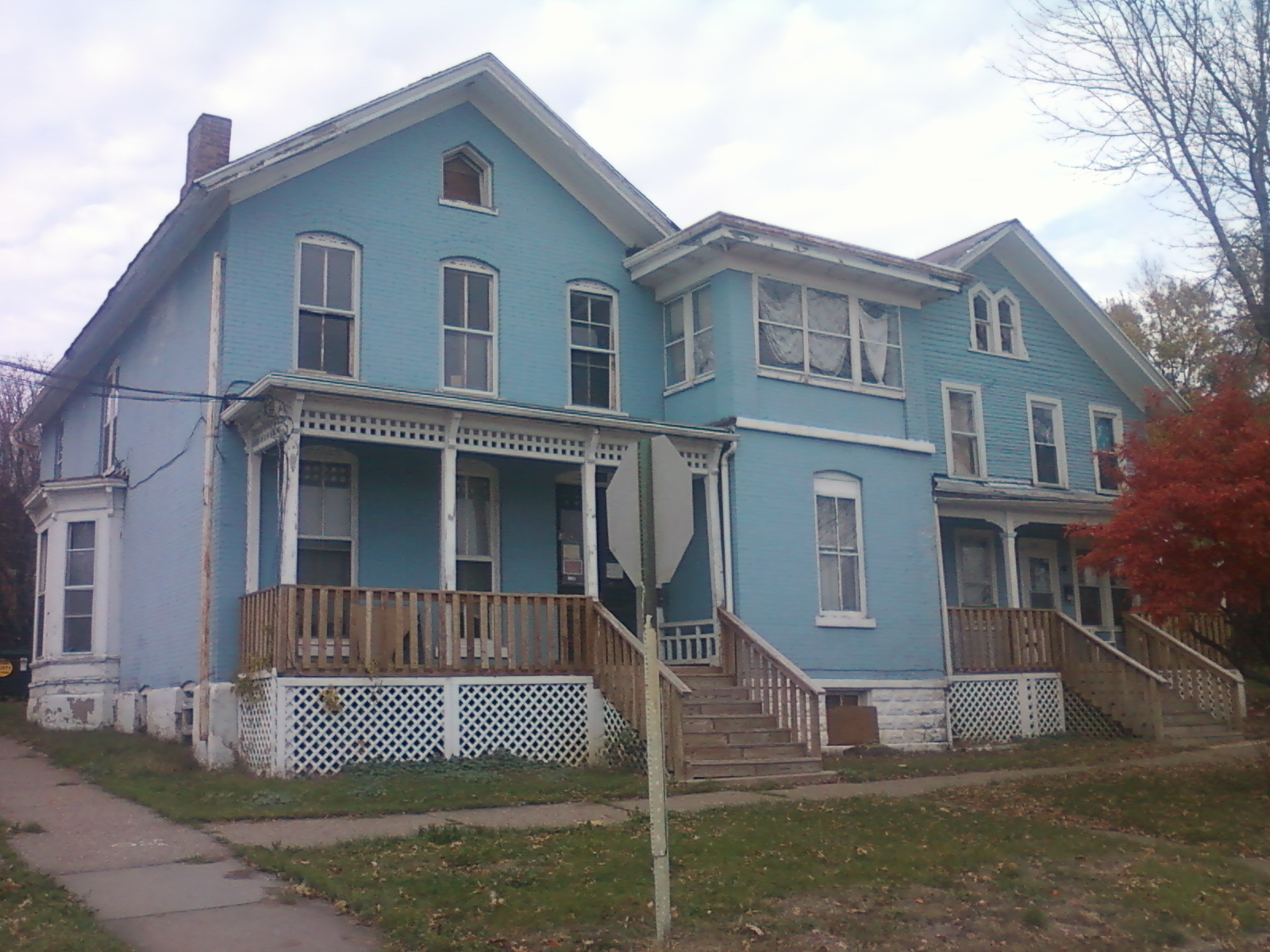
302 E 6th St: Floyd Dell home (razed).

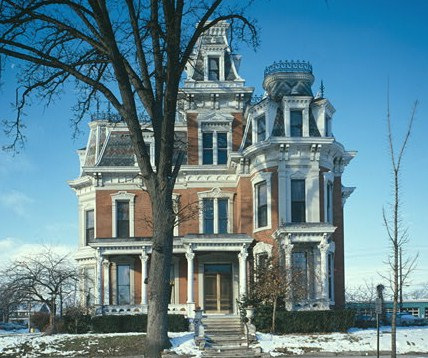
1208 Main St: Arthur Davison Ficke boyhood home

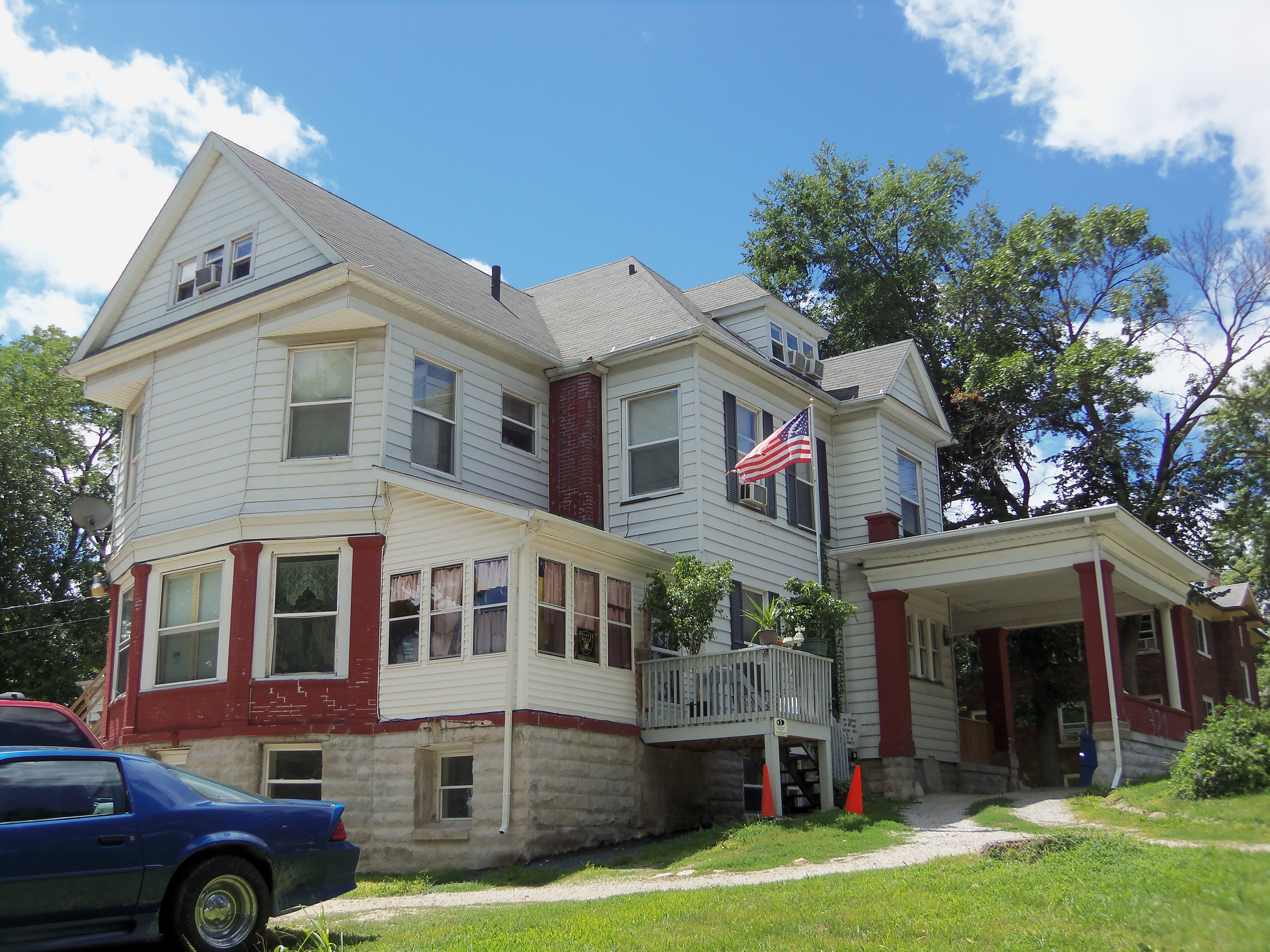
321 E. 10th St: Alice French home
