= Charles Eugene Banks =

American poet

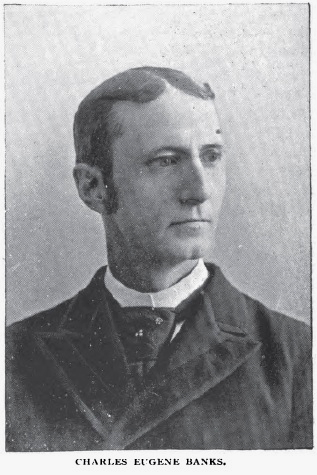
- Born: Charles Eugene Banks; April 3, 1852; Clinton County, Iowa, United States
- Died: April 30, 1932 (aged 80); Honolulu, Hawaii, United States
- Spouse: Carrie Wyatt Lounsbury

Signature
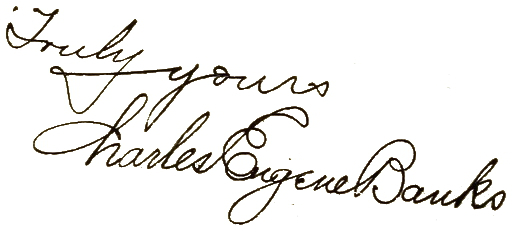

Charles Eugene Banks (April 3, 1852 – April 30, 1932) was an American newspaper editor, journalist, author, novelist, poet, playwright, historian, and orator. Considered a mentor of the Davenport Group of writers in Iowa, he later moved to Seattle. There he was an editor of the Seattle Post-Intelligencer newspaper. He retired to Hawaii.

== Biography ==
Banks was born to Seth Lee and Sarah M. Banks at Lyons in Clinton County, Iowa. Raised on a farm, he was educated by his mother for several years before attending public schools. As a poetically-inclined traveling shoe salesman, Banks began his professional writing career with submissions to a regionally distributed trade journal. He eventually found writing work in Chicago, wherein 1892 he married actress Carrie Wyatt Lounsbury.

Banks returned to Iowa with his wife, and in Davenport, started a journal. There he mentored several young writers, who became known as the Davenport group, including Susan Glaspell, George Cram Cook, and Floyd Dell.

Banks later moved to Seattle, Washington, where he worked as an editor for the Seattle Post-Intelligencer newspaper. He retired to Hawaii. Banks was widowed in 1926. In 1932 he was struck by an automobile and died. His close personal friend, noted attorney Clarence Darrow, delivered Banks' eulogy and served as executor of his estate. According to his obituary, Banks left no surviving offspring.
