= Alice French =

American novelist

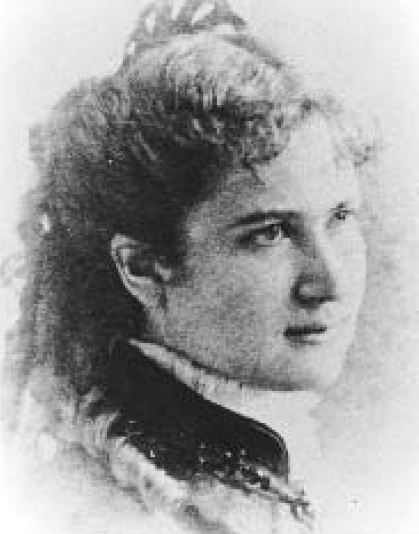
- Born: March 19, 1850; Andover, Massachusetts
- Died: January 9, 1934 (aged 83); Davenport, Iowa
- Resting place: Oakdale Memorial Gardens
- Occupation: Writer
- Relatives: Marcus Morton (grandfather)
- Writing career
- Pen name: Octave Thanet
- Notable work: Expiation

Alice French (March 19, 1850 – January 9, 1934), better known as Octave Thanet, was an American novelist and short fiction writer.

== Biography ==
Alice French was born at Andover, Massachusetts, a daughter of George Henry French, a successful leather merchant, and his wife Frances Morton. Frances Morton French was the daughter of Massachusetts Governor Marcus Morton. Alice had four brothers: George, Morton, Nathaniel, and Robert.

In 1856 the French family moved to Davenport, Iowa, where the father engaged in manufacturing agricultural implements. Alice progressed through the public schools, then studied at Vassar College in Poughkeepsie, New York. She later transferred to Abbot Academy in Andover, graduating in 1868, and returning to Davenport.

== Later life ==
By 1890, she had been settled in her comfortable lifelong lesbian partnership with a widowed friend, Jane Allen Crawford (1851-1932), for close to a decade, dividing their year between their home in Davenport, Iowa, and their plantation in Arkansas. The two women shared their lives, except for Jane's four-year marriage and then her European tour. Their home in Iowa, the Alice French House, has been on the National Register of Historic Places since 1983. For fifteen years, the home they shared in Arkansas known as Thanford, was also on the National Register (until its destruction by fire).

Critics and editors acclaimed Octave Thanet. She was financially successful as a writer, though her investments in banks and railroads provided most of her income. In the 1890s, French published ten books. Between 1896 and 1900, fifty of her stories were published, and four different publishers collected five volumes for reprinting.

In 1909, French and Crawford gave up their Thanford house, after which French traveled widely in the United States, speaking for the conservative causes she embraced, adding to them her opposition to woman suffrage. She regularly attended the reunions of the Daughters of the American Revolution in Washington, D.C.

Her point of view remained fixed in the era of her youth. After the first year of the twentieth century, she lost touch with literary and social developments in the United States. She developed diabetes, and complications from the disease caused the loss of one leg and most of her eyesight. She died on January 9, 1934, in Davenport. She is buried alongside Jane Allen Crawford in Davenport's Oakdale Memorial Gardens

== Writing ==
French began her literary career with a sentimental story, Hugo's Waiting, printed in the Davenport Gazette in 1871. She then worked on Communists and Capitalists, A Sketch from Life, inspired by a railroad workers' strike. The piece was published in October 1878 in Lippincott's Monthly Magazine, which paid her forty-two dollars, the first money she earned from writing. At that point, French took the pseudonym “Octave Thanet.” She later claimed that she chose “Octave” because it was gender-neutral, and that she had seen the word “Thanet” written on a freight car in the Davenport yards. She published stories and essays in such national periodicals as the Atlantic Monthly, Harper’s, Scribner’s Magazine, and Century Magazine. These were often republished in book-length collections. She also published several novels and a work about photography.

Her first works contained a social and economic bent, such as Schopenhauer on Lake Pepin: A Study, but she soon turned to short stories. Iowa and Arkansas gave her opportunities for exploiting regions hitherto little attempted in fiction. Her stories The Bishop's Vagabond, The Hay of the Cyclone, and Whitsun Harp, Regulator were popular. These initially appeared in the Atlantic Monthly and Scribner's Magazine. Later they appeared in her books. Her novel Expiation (1890), won high praise. She prided herself on accurately depicting the physical setting of her stories, and limning the customs and dialect of her characters.

French also drew on her travel experiences. The “Schopenhauer” piece arose from a trip to the upper Mississippi Valley. Following a three-month coach tour of Great Britain with industrialist Andrew Carnegie, she published A Day in an English Town and Through Great Britain in a Drag in Lippincott’s.

The Alice French House in Arkansas (Thanford) was the center of the area's literary and artistic life, with frequent galas and dinner parties hosting the literati and prominent citizens. French also exercised other talents at Thanford; she had a woodworking shop, where she built shelves and simple furniture, and a darkroom, where she developed and printed photographs with chemicals she mixed herself, an experience that she described and illustrated in An Adventure in Photography, which was first published by Scribner’s in 1893.

== Partial bibliography ==
- The Bishop's Vagabond (1884)
- Knitters in the Sun (1887)
- We All (1889)
- Expiation (1890)
- Victory's Divorcement (with Lura Eugenie Brown Smith, 1891)
- Stories of a Western Town (1892)
- Otto the Knight (1893)
- The Defeat of Amos Wickliff (1896)
- The Stout Miss Hopkins's Bicycle (1897)
- The Dream Captured (1897)
- A Book of True Lovers (1897)
- Missionary Sheriff (1897)
- The Heart of Toil (1898)
- An Adventure in Photography (1899)
- The Best Letters of Mary Wortley Montagu (1901) (editor)
- The Man of the Hour (1905)
- The Lion's Share (1907)
- By Inheritance (1910)
- Stories That End Well (1911)
- A Step on the Stair (1913)

== See also ==
Two of Alice French's houses have been listed on the National Register of Historic Places:

- Alice French House (Clover Bend, Arkansas)
- Alice French House (Davenport, Iowa)
