= Original Wasco County Courthouse =

- First Wasco County Courthouse
- U.S. National Register of Historic Places
- U.S. Historic district – Contributing property
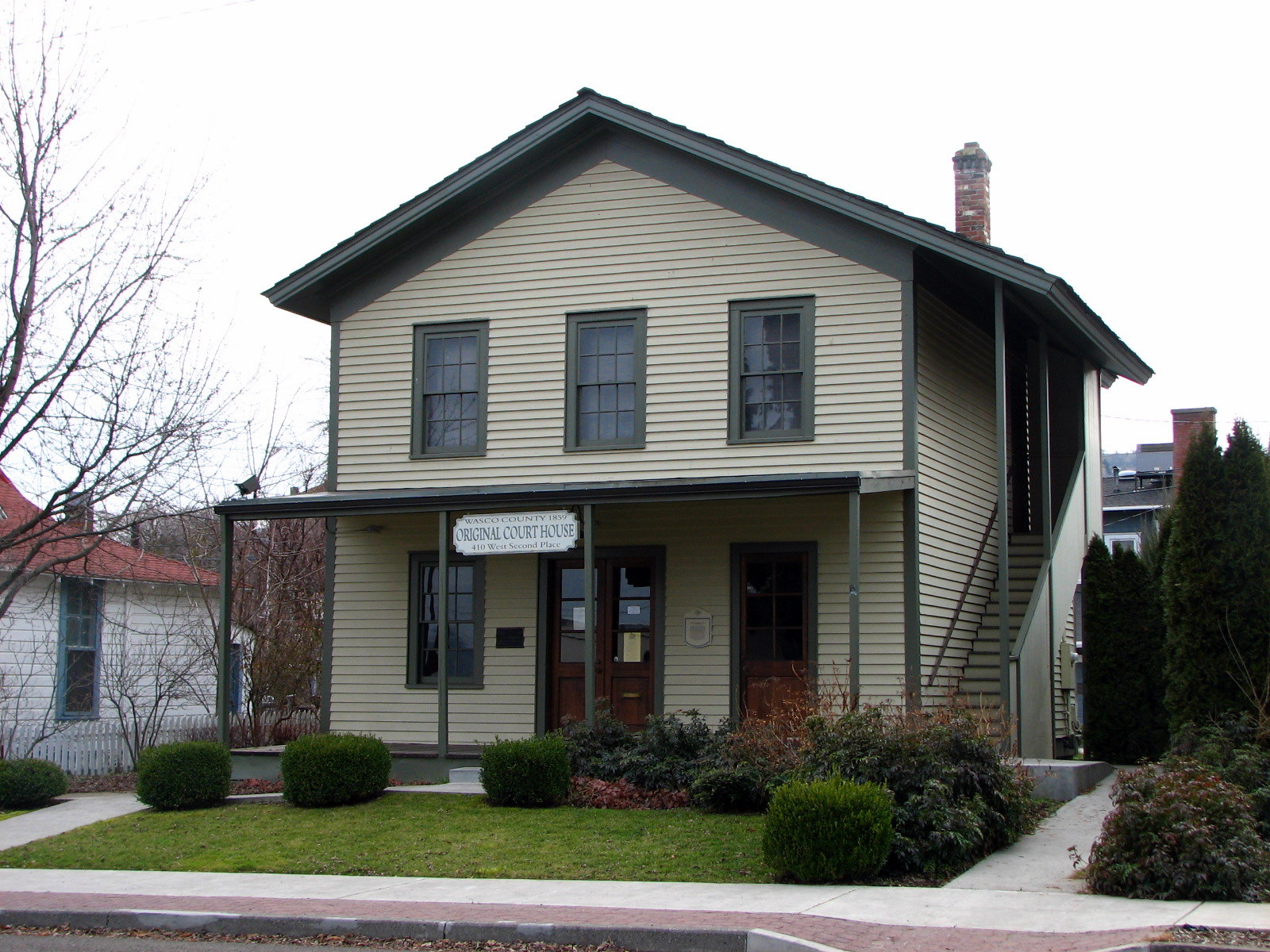

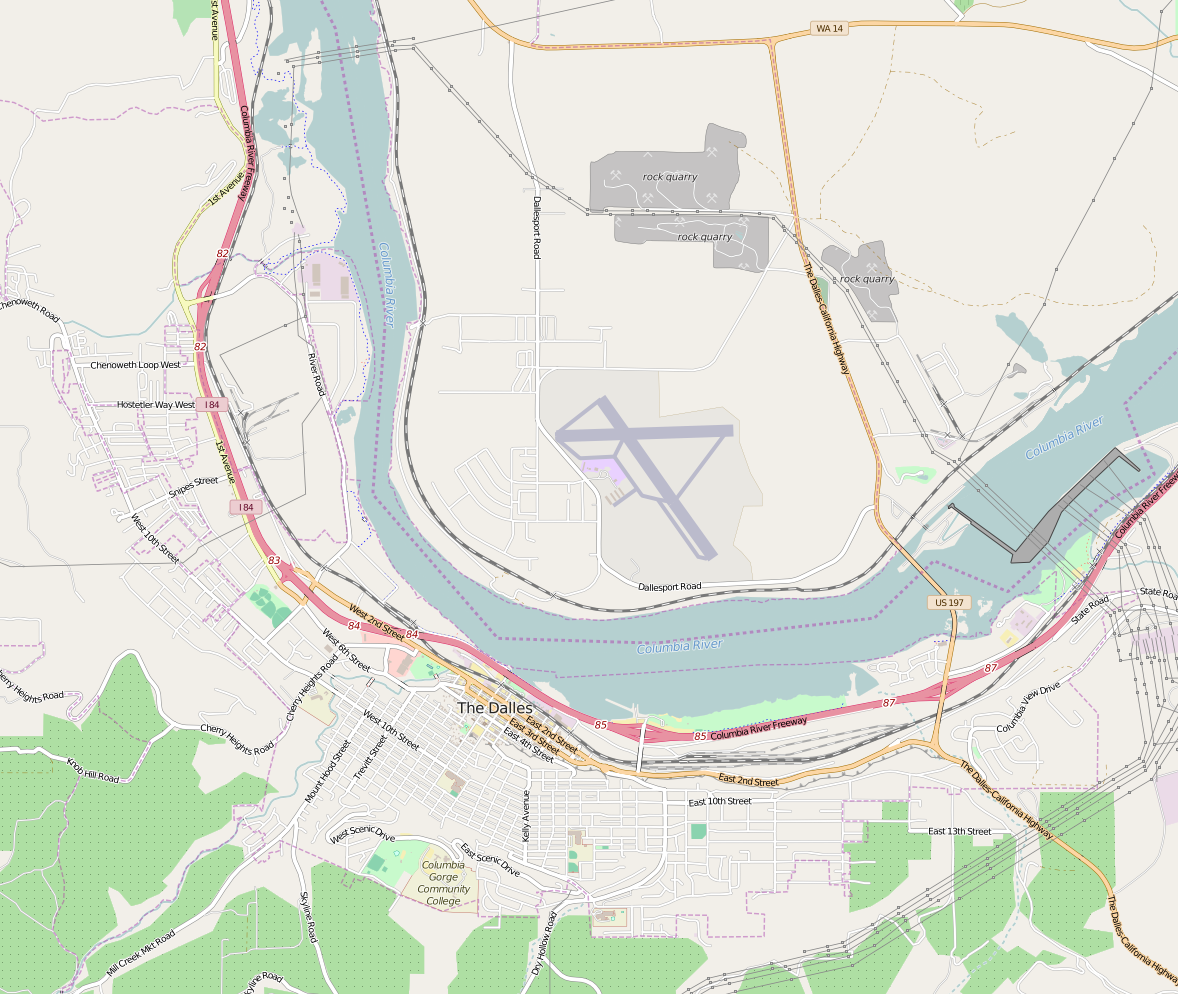
- Location within The Dalles OR
- Location: 410 W. 2nd Place; The Dalles, Oregon
- Coordinates: 45°36′13″N 121°11′19″W
- Built: 1859
- Part of: Trevitt's Addition Historic District (ID95000686)
- NRHP reference No.: 98000260 (previously 77001116)

Significant dates
- First listed on NRHP: November 16, 1977
- First de-listed: March 18, 1998
- Re-listed: March 18, 1998

The Original Wasco County Courthouse is a historic former courthouse, located in The Dalles, Oregon, United States. It is listed on the National Register of Historic Places under the name First Wasco County Courthouse, and is also listed as a contributing resource in the National Register-listed Trevitt's Addition Historic District.

One of only two remaining courthouses from prior to Oregon statehood, this building served Wasco County from 1859 until 1882, and then as The Dalles city hall until 1907. From its original location in downtown The Dalles, it has been moved several times before its current location within Trevitt's Addition Historic District.

As of 2010, it was managed as a museum by the Wasco County Historical Society.

== See also ==
- National Register of Historic Places listings in Wasco County, Oregon
