= Joseph D. and Margaret Kelly House =

Historic house in Oregon, United States

- U.S. National Register of Historic Places
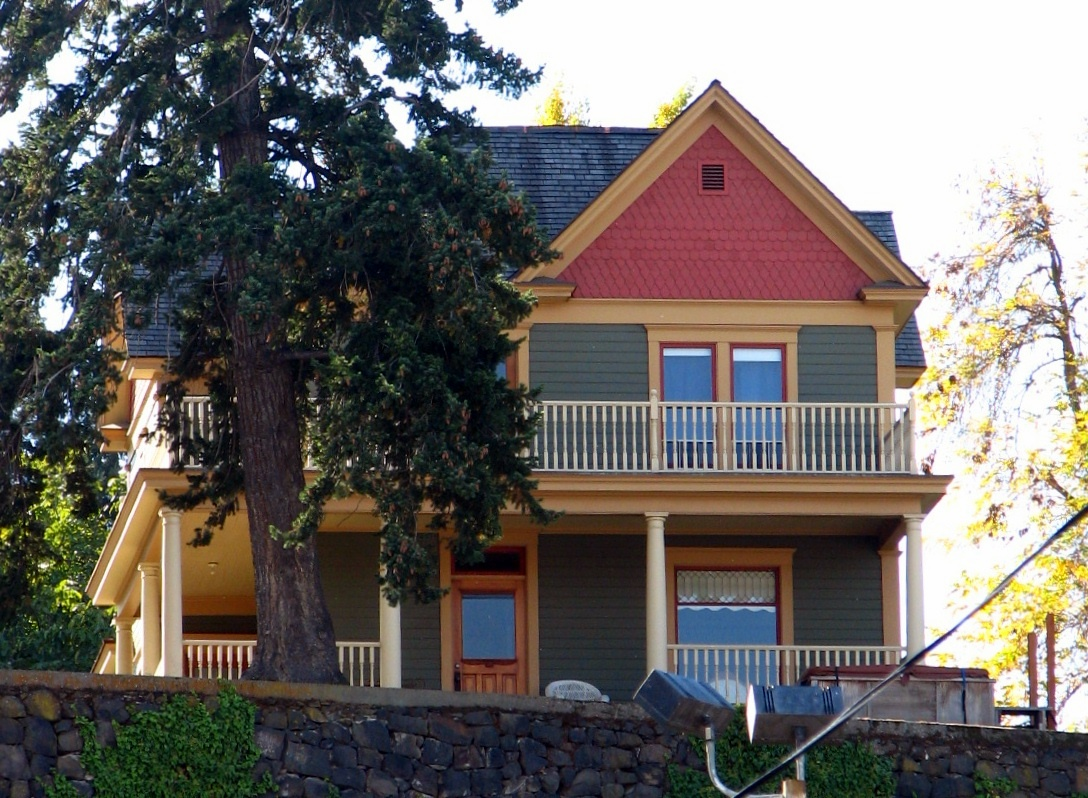
- The Kelly House in 2008, seen from downtown The Dalles, below the bluff

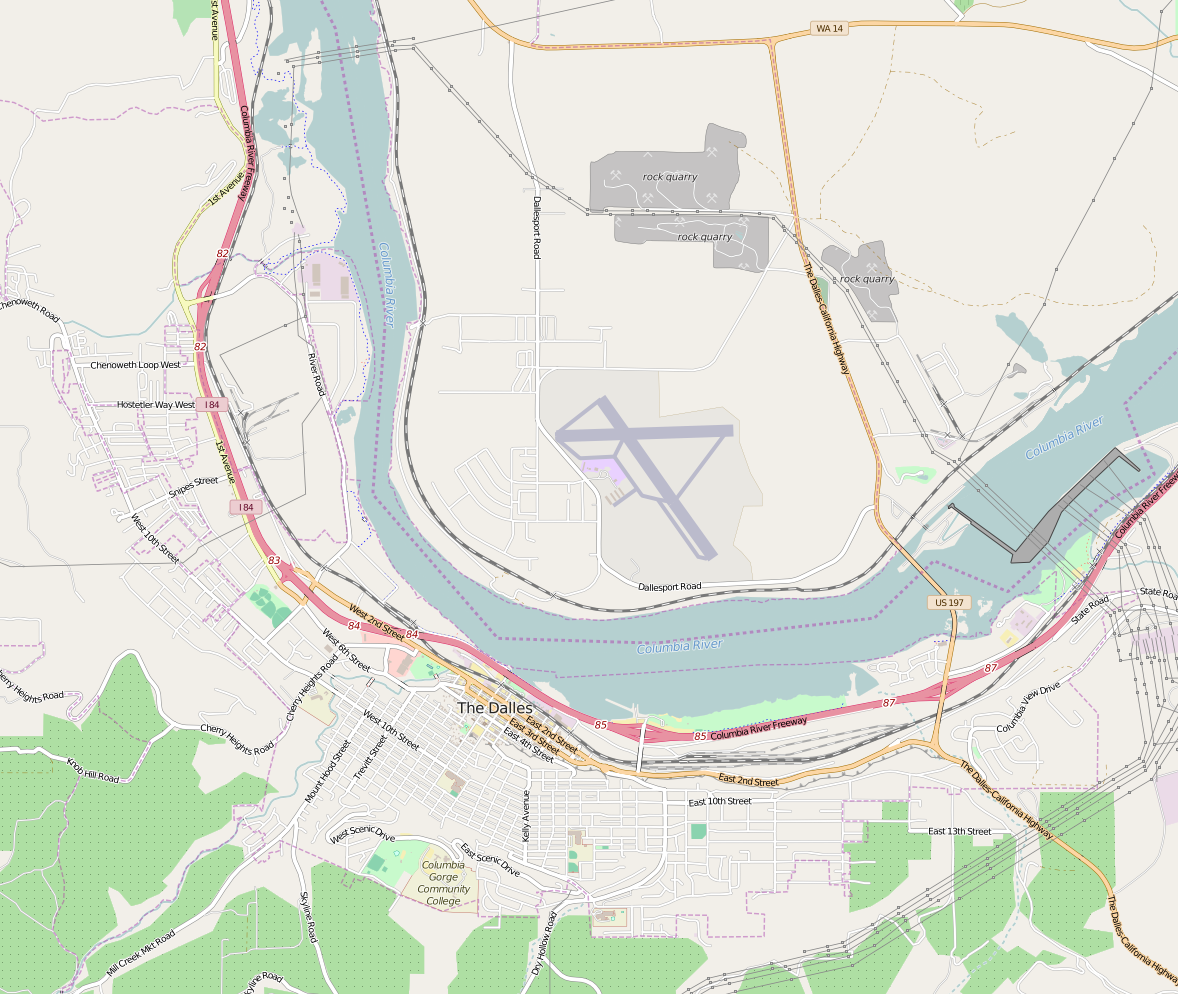
- Location within The Dalles OR
- Location: 921 E. 7th Street; The Dalles, Oregon
- Coordinates: 45°35′51″N 121°10′41″W
- Area: 0.43 acres (0.17 ha)
- Built: 1908
- Architectural style: Queen Anne, with Colonial Revival details
- Restored: 1990s
- NRHP reference No.: 99000641
- Added to NRHP: May 27, 1999

The Joseph D. and Margaret Kelly House is a historic residence in The Dalles, Oregon, United States. Joseph Kelly, a highly successful farmer during the establishment of wheat as a major cash crop in Wasco County, retired young to this 1908 blufftop house and continued his career as a landlord and businessman. He and his wife Margaret, a teacher and member of another important wheat family, became a prominent philanthropic figures in The Dalles. The house is architecturally notable for its vernacular rendering of the Queen Anne style, reflecting the Kellys' rural background in contrast to the high Victorian approach used elsewhere in The Dalles.

The house was added to the National Register of Historic Places in 1999.

== See also ==
- National Register of Historic Places listings in Wasco County, Oregon
- Bennett–Williams House
- Hugh Glenn House
- John L. Thompson House
