= Lura Eugenie Brown Smith =

American journalist

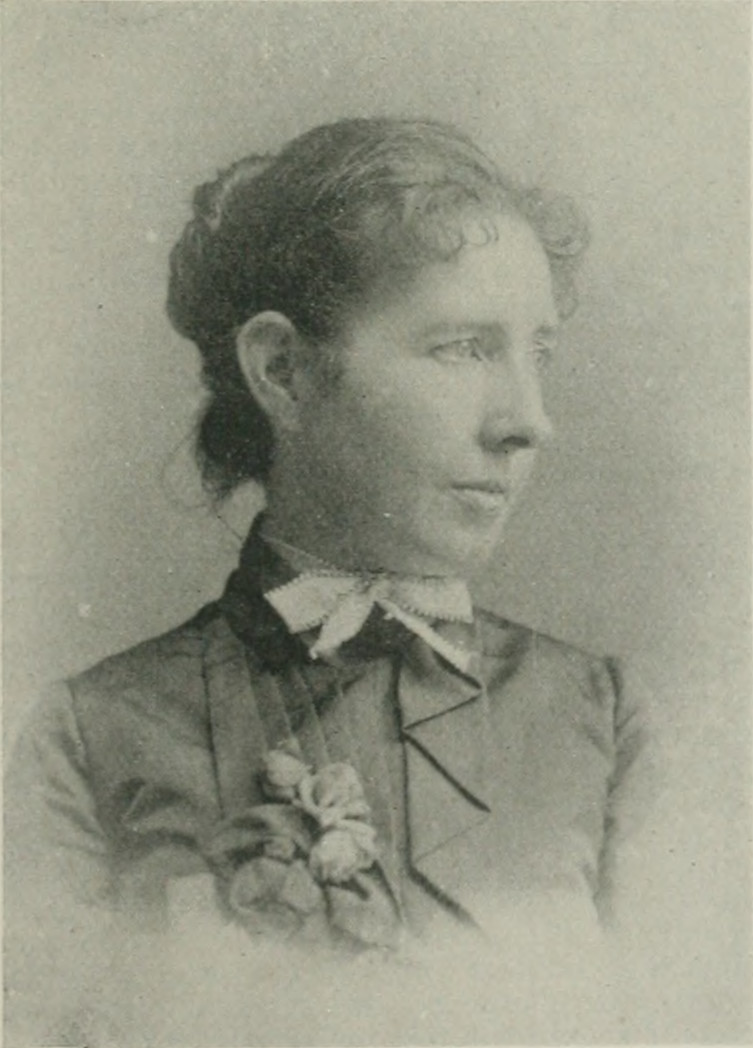
- "A Woman of the Century"
- Born: Lura Eugenie Brown; June 23, 1854/64; Rochester, New York, U.S.
- Died: April 11, 1935; Masonic Home of Washington, in Zenith, King County, Washington
- Resting place: Hillcrest Burial Park in Kent, Washington
- Occupations: journalist; newspaper editor; author
- Spouse: Sidney Smith (m. 1892; died 1930)
- Parents: Leverett Russell Brown; Catherine Anne Ostrander Brown
- Writing career
- Pen name: Lura E. Brown
- Language: English
- Notable works: On the Track and Off the Train

Signature
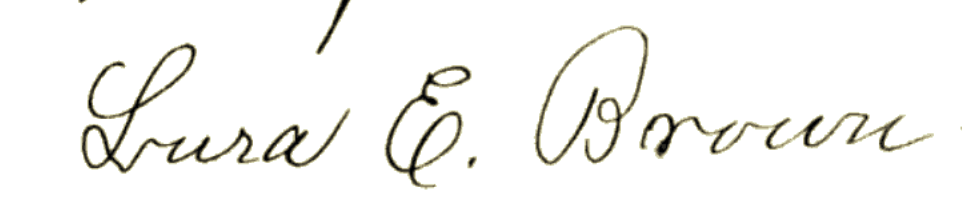

Lura Eugenie Brown Smith (June 23, 1854/64 – April 11, 1935) was an American journalist, newspaper editor, and author. She wrote short stories, poems, and miscellany, and did editorial work in newspapers. She was the author of Victory's Divorcement (with Alice French, 1891) and On the Track and Off the Train (1892), and the editor of The Autocrat of Arkansas (1883).

== Early life ==
Lura (Note: The given name is sometimes misspelled "Laura".) Eugenie Brown was born in Rochester, New York, June 23, 1854 or June 23, 1864. (Note: Lura Smith's death certificate records the date of birth as June 23, 1854, as do Herringshaw (1914), and Leonard & Marquis (1908). Willard & Livermore (1893) record June 23, 1864.)

Her father, Leverett Russell Brown, died in Little Rock, Arkansas, in January, 1891. Her grandfather, Joseph Patterson Brown, was a citizen of Windsor, New York, where he married Lura M. Russell. Smith's mother was Catherine Anne Ostrander, a member of the Knickerbocker community in New York state. Smith was the second of a family of four children. The eldest sibling, George Russell Brown (b. 1852), was the president and principal owner of the Press Printing Company, which served as Arkansas state printers in Little Rock.

== Career ==
Smith removed to Little Rock, in 1883, and engaged in journalistic work since 1884. She became one of the most widely known journalists of the South, and she was well known also in the North. Her early work in that field included correspondence of the special sort for Arkansas, Tennessee, Texas, and other journals. For a time, she edited the Arkansas Life, and for several years, was the poet of the Arkansas Press Association. She was an earnest worker in the Chautauqua Circle in Little Rock. At one time, she held a department editorship on the Milwaukee Sunday Telegraph, which failing health compelled her to give up. In April 1903, Smith, through the general Press Bureau, received an official invitation to attend the dedication ceremonies of the Louisiana Purchase Exposition at St. Louis, Missouri.

With her husband, Sidney Smith, she was co-editor and owner of the Northwestern Freemason. The Masonic Tribune, an eight-page, four-column weekly newspaper devoted to the welfare of Masons and their families, appeared for the first time December 14, 1916. It was published in Seattle, Washington under the editorship and management of Sidney Smith and John H. Reid. Mrs. Smith was associate and literary editor.

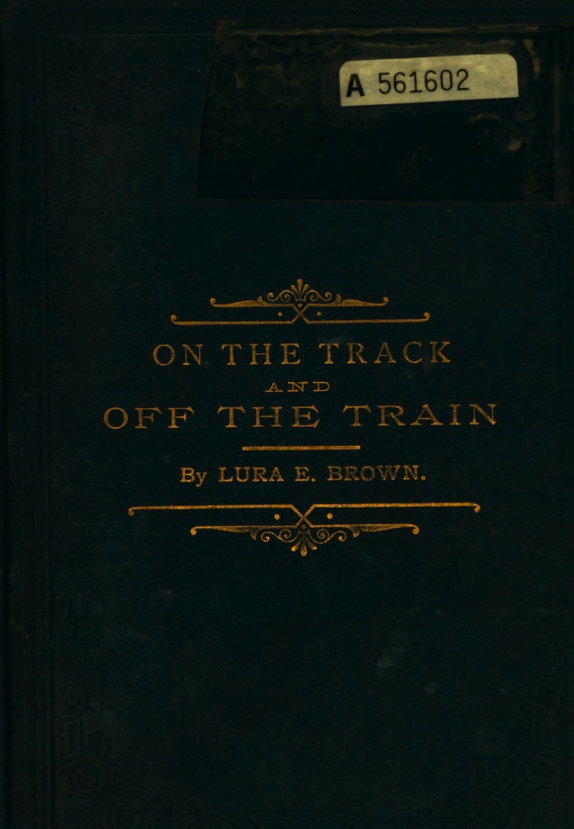
On the Track and Off the Train (1892)

With Octave Thanet, Smith was co-author of Victory's Divorcement (New York, 1891). She contributed "The Autocrat of Arkansas" to the Arkansas Press in 1890, which was later published in book form. In 1891, she wrote the serial "On the Track and Off the Train", which in 1892 was also issued in book form.

Smith was a member of the Daughters of the American Revolution, the American Academy of Political and Social Science, Woman's Relief Corps, the Order of the Eastern Star, and National Geographic Society. While serving as the Washington State Representative to the National League of American Pen Women, she worked in the interest of the Welfare, Protection, and Rescue Association. Smith was also an honorary member of the Arkansas Press Association.

== Personal life ==
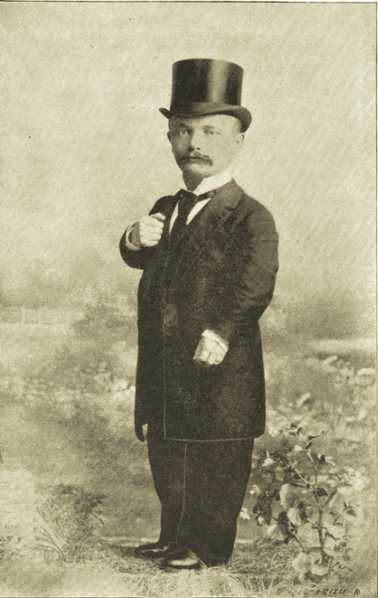
Sidney Smith

In Little Rock, on April 20, 1892, she married Sidney Smith (1857–1930), editor of the Cedar Rapids, Iowa, Masonic Review, and the couple made their first home in that city. His first jobs were that of telegraph operator and assistant station agent at Sac City, Iowa, for the Chicago & North Western Railroad. He was a member of the Iowa State Traveling Men's Association, a Mason, a Noble of the Mystic Shrine, a Past Junior Grand Warden of the Masonic Grand Lodge of Iowa, and a member of the Brotherhood of Elks. His parents were of ordinary size but an accident to Sidney's spine in infancy stunted his growth without causing any deformity, leaving him short, at 4 feet 2 inches (1.27 m) in height.

In religion, Smith was Episcopalian. She favored woman suffrage.

Lura Eugenie Brown Smith died at the Masonic Home of Washington, in Zenith, King County, Washington, April 11, 1935, and was buried in Hillcrest Burial Park in Kent, Washington.

== Selected works ==
- Victory's Divorcement, with Alice French/Octave Thanet (1891)
- On the Track and Off the Train, by Lura E. Brown (1892)

=== Editor ===
- The Autocrat of Arkansas (1883)
