= Trevitt's Addition Historic District =

Historic district in Oregon, United States

- U.S. National Register of Historic Places
- U.S. Historic district
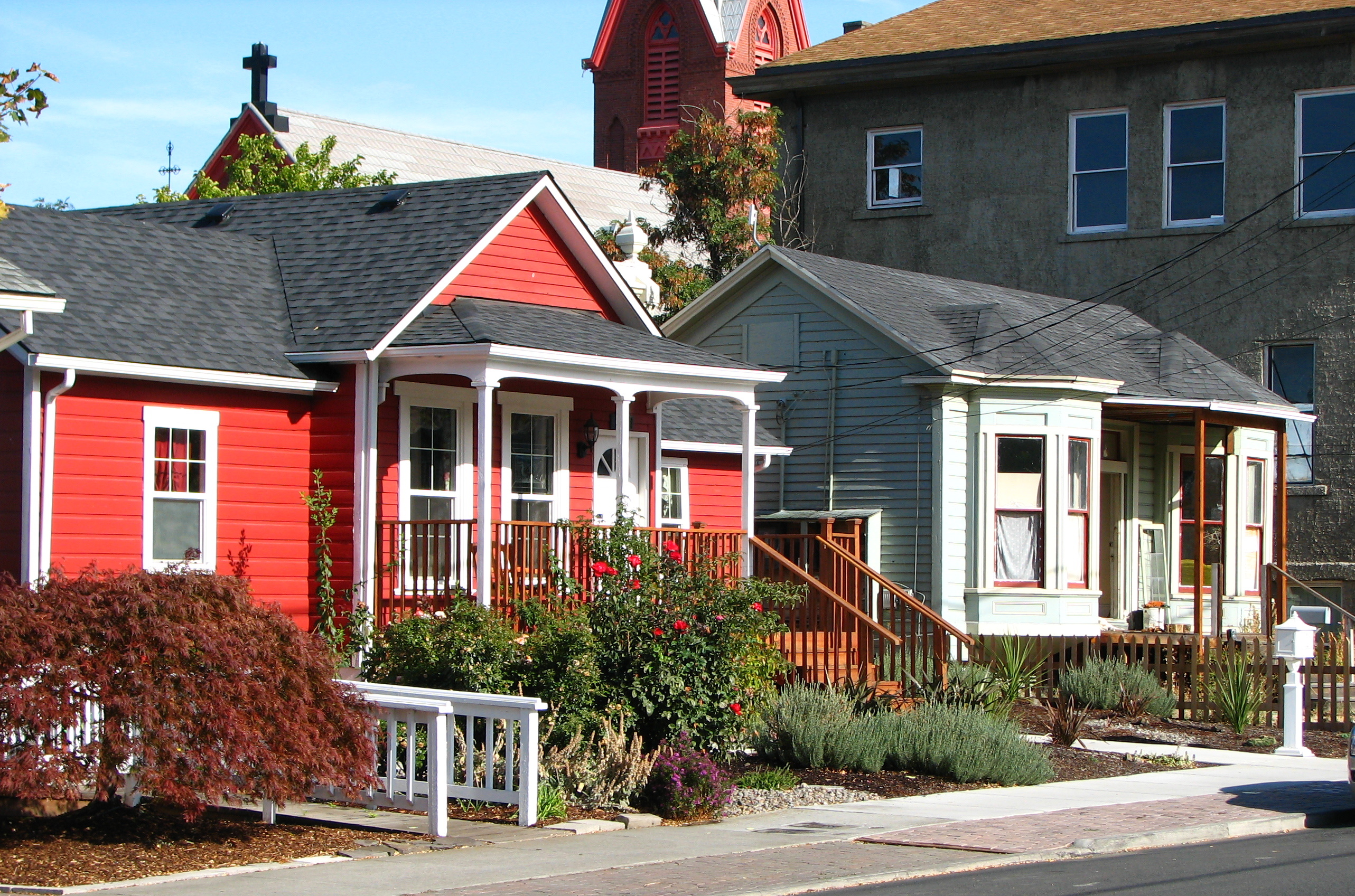
- The Carey and Wall Houses on West 4th Street in Trevitt's Addition. In the background, the former St. Peter's Roman Catholic Church and Vogt Hall are visible.

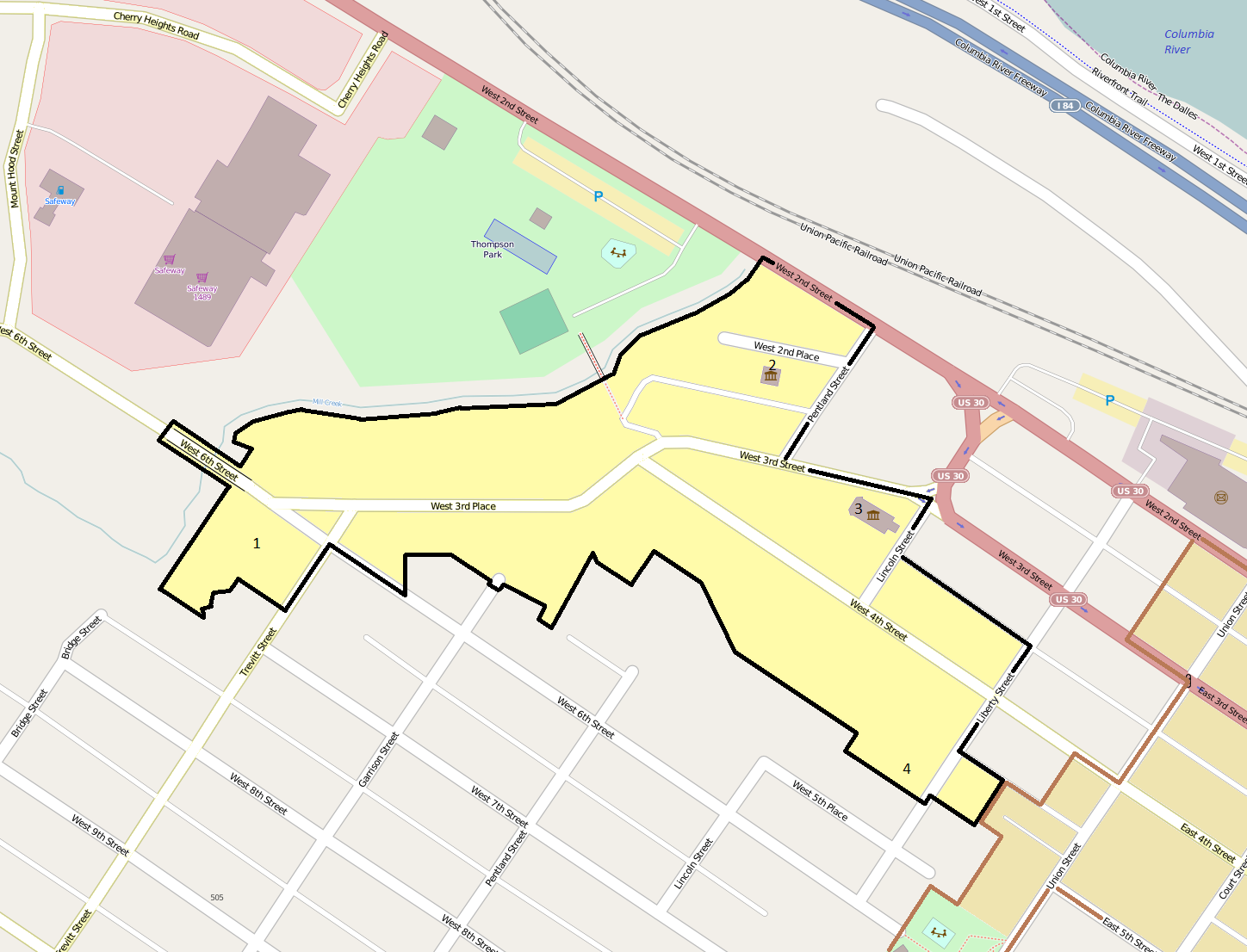
- Trevitt's Addition Historic District boundaries in The Dalles
- Location: The Dalles, Oregon
- Coordinates: 45°36′09″N 121°11′24″W
- Built: 1864–1937
- NRHP reference No.: 95000686
- Added to NRHP: June 20, 1995

Trevitt's Addition Historic District is a neighborhood, primarily residential in character, located in The Dalles, Oregon, United States. Victor Trevitt platted the first expansion of the original 1855 "Dalles City" townsite in 1860, and continued to extend his addition in response to economic developments. The district saw the first flour mill and electrical and water systems in The Dalles, one of the area's earliest Catholic churches, and direct connection to transportation networks including the Columbia River Highway and the railroad. Surviving buildings in the district reflect a continuous spectrum of architectural styles from 1864 to 1937.

The historic district was listed on the National Register of Historic Places in 1995.

== See also ==
- National Register of Historic Places listings in Wasco County, Oregon
- Bennett–Williams House
- Old St. Peter's Landmark
- Original Wasco County Courthouse
- Edward French House
