= Old St. Peter's Landmark =

Historic church in Oregon, United States

- St. Peter's Roman Catholic Church
- U.S. National Register of Historic Places
- U.S. Historic district – Contributing property
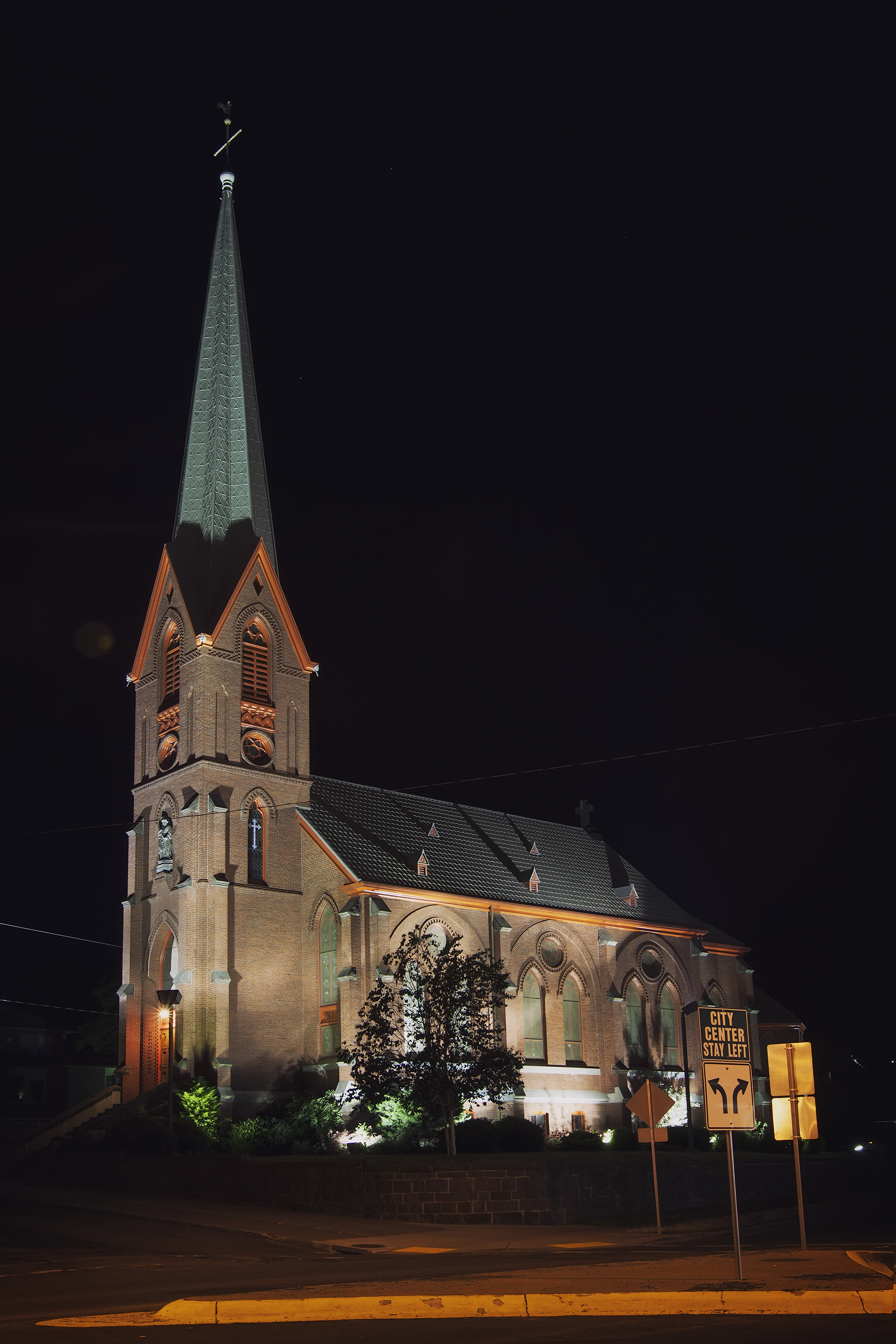
- Old St. Peter's Landmark, The Dalles, Oregon

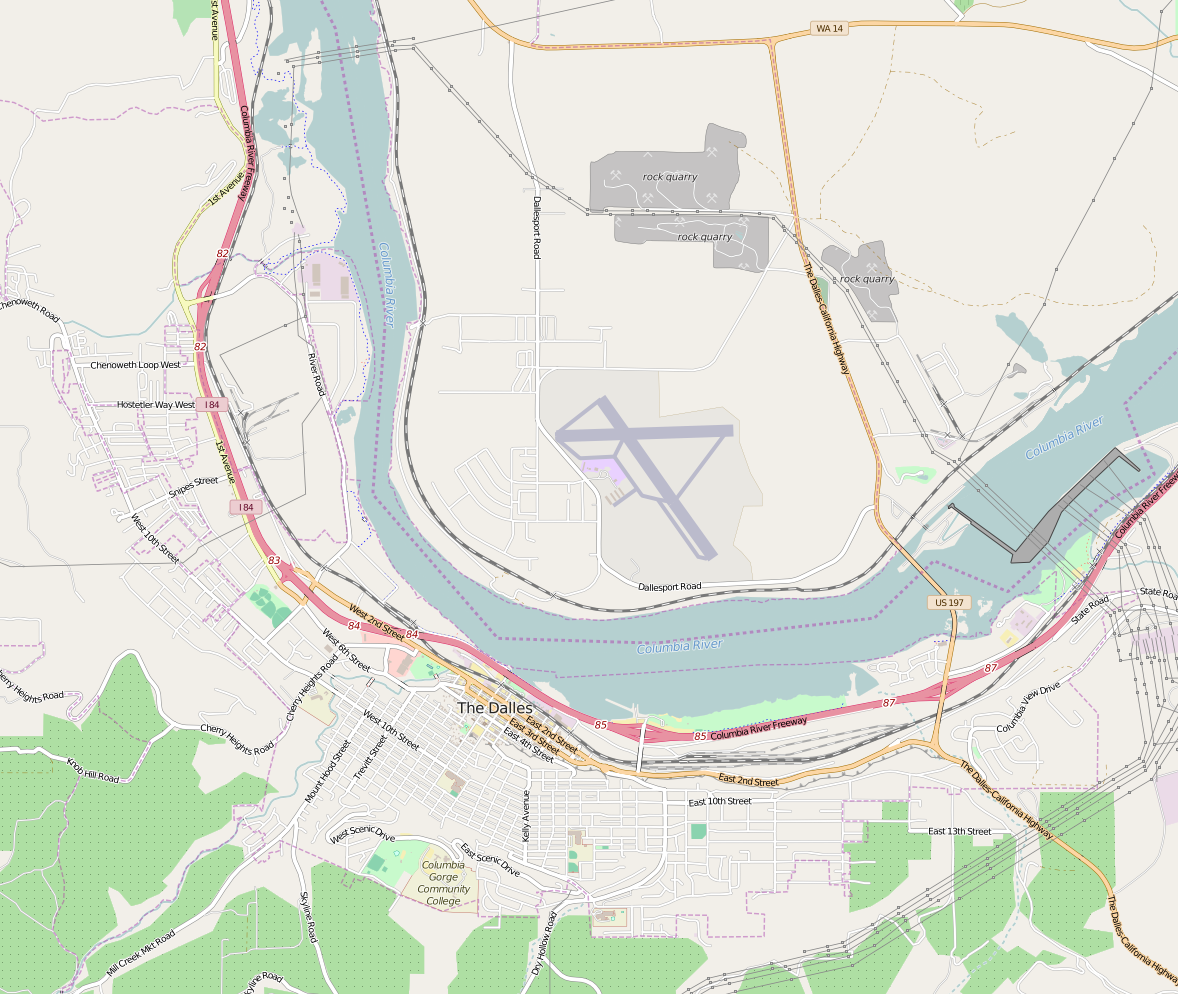
- Location within The Dalles OR
- Location: 3rd and Lincoln Sts., The Dalles, Oregon
- Coordinates: 45°36′10″N 121°11′15″W
- Area: 0.4 acres (0.16 ha)
- Built: 1897
- Architectural style: Gothic Revival
- Part of: Trevitt's Addition Historic District (ID95000686)
- NRHP reference No.: 74001720
- Added to NRHP: June 20, 1974

Old Saint Peter's Landmark, commonly referred to simply as Old St. Peter's, is a historic building located at the corner of 3rd and Lincoln Streets in downtown The Dalles, Oregon, United States. It was built in 1897 and dedicated on March 17, 1898 as St. Peter's Church, and served the local Roman Catholic congregation as its place of worship until 1968. It was saved from scheduled demolition in 1971 by a group of concerned citizens who formed Old St. Peter's Landmark, Inc., for that specific purpose, and which maintains the building as a museum and site for weddings, concerts and other cultural events.

== Architecture and appointments ==
The building is an example of Gothic Revival architecture, and was constructed of red brick with a roof of galvanized iron Spanish tile. 120 feet (36.6 m) long and 40 feet (12.2 m) wide, the church boasts a spire which reaches 176 feet (53.6 m) at its peak, topped by a six-foot rooster weathervane, a symbol of the Saint Peter.One parishioner stated her father, a blacksmith across the street from church at the time, made the rooster weathervane. Its height makes it literally a landmark, as it is visible from virtually all points in the city, and has been used by surveyors as a reference point from the time it was built to the present day. It is still used as a reference point by river boat pilots. The belfry houses a 533-pound (242 kg) bell connected to a rope which reaches to the narthex.

Old St. Peter's features 34 stained glass windows, typical of Victorian art glass style. They were designed and installed by the Povey Brothers Studio in Portland, Oregon, including six rose windows. The faces of the daughters of David Povey were included among the cherubs depicted in the rose windows. The names on the window dedications include many pioneer families.

The statue of the Virgin Mary was carved from the keel of a sailing ship which sank off the coast of San Francisco in the mid-1850s. The keel was retrieved at the behest of two The Dalles families and the statue carved as a thank you for the survival of their loved ones.

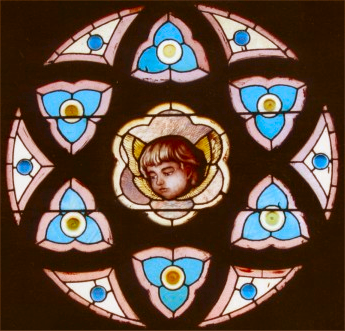
Cherub rose window.

The interior vaulted ceiling, nearly 40 feet at its highest point, is of stamped metal, and the sanctuary is decorated with painted detail by German artist Theodore Braash, who completed his work over several months in 1954 and 1955. The railings and altars are of Carrara marble, created and installed by Italian artisans.

The building as you see it today is as it was when saved in 1971, with the exception of a few more stations of the Cross having been returned. The Church chose not to take any of the interior appointments or furnishings, including statuary, baptistry, wooden hand-carved confessionals or pews decorated by steam press with wood and pearl trim in a leaf and ivy motif.

The Kilgen pipe organ, made of rare tigerwood and installed in 1927, thanks to the Church Ladies Society at the time, is still in place in the loft at the back of the nave, and has been kept in working condition. This pipe organ was made by the same company that made the pipe organ in St. Patrick's Cathedral in New York City. The first pump organ to be used at St. Peter's is on display, as well as a collapsible pump organ, transported by horseback, as the priest traveled the county.

== See also ==
- National Register of Historic Places listings in Wasco County, Oregon
