= Bennett–Williams House =

Historic house in Oregon, United States

- U.S. National Register of Historic Places
- U.S. Historic district – Contributing property
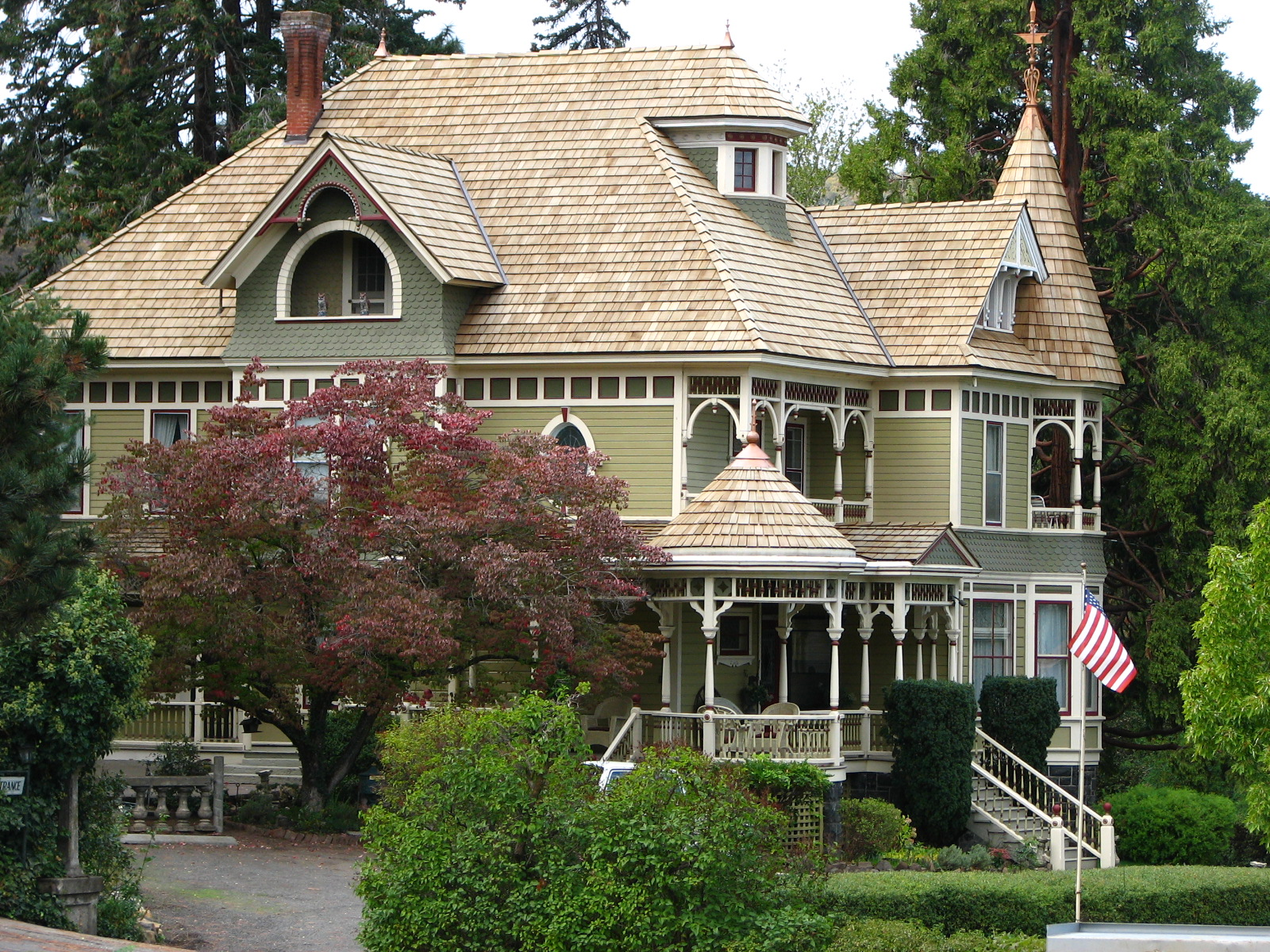
- The Bennett–Williams House in 2008

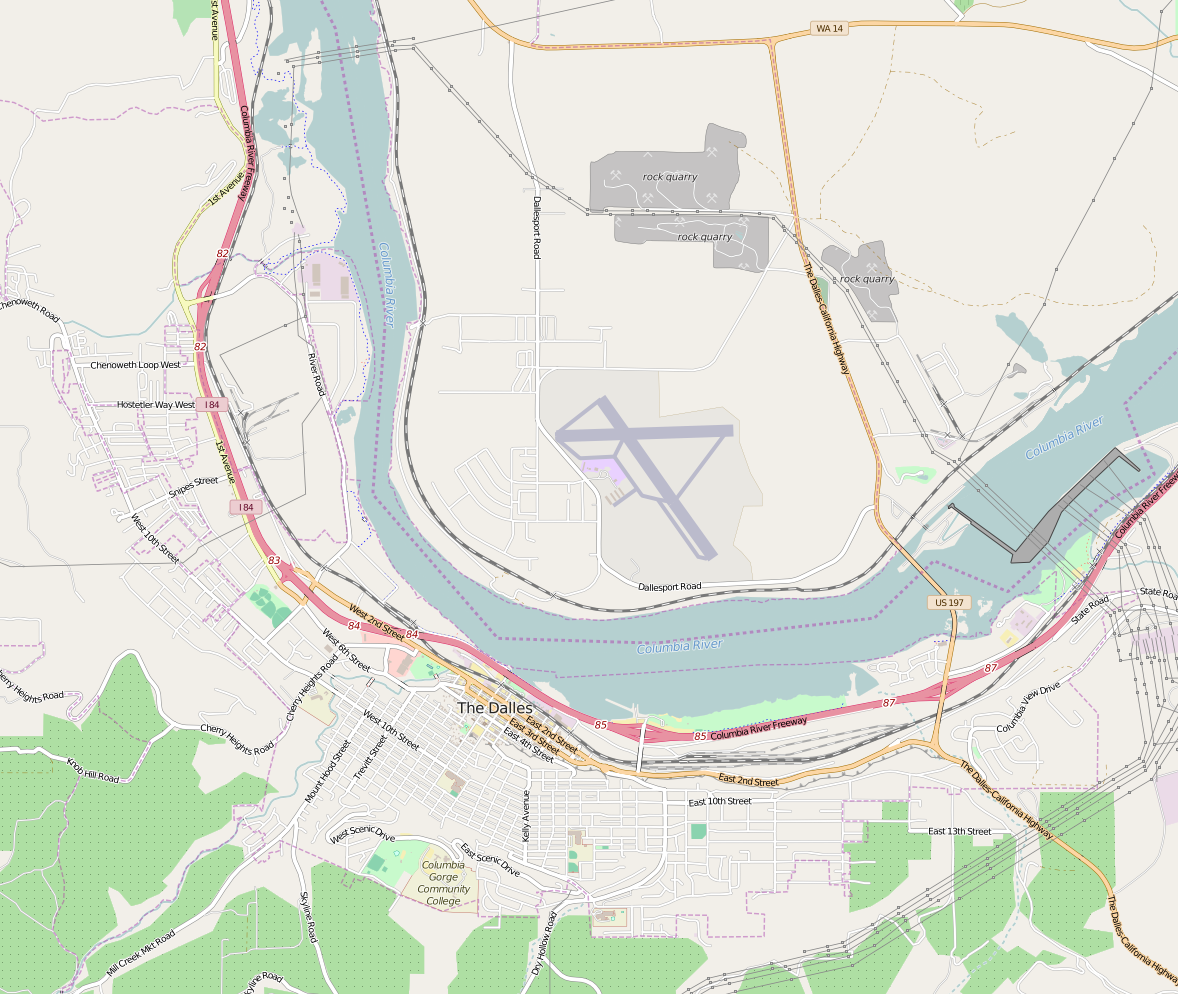
- Location within The Dalles OR
- Location: 608 W. 6th Street; The Dalles, Oregon
- Coordinates: 45°36′09″N 121°11′35″W
- Area: 1.36 acres (0.55 ha)
- Built: ca. 1899
- Architectural style: Queen Anne
- Part of: Trevitt's Addition Historic District (ID95000686)
- NRHP reference No.: 86000291
- Added to NRHP: February 27, 1986

The Bennett–Williams House is a historic house, located in The Dalles, Oregon, United States. It is listed on the National Register of Historic Places, and is also listed as a contributing resource in the National Register-listed Trevitt's Addition Historic District.

Built circa 1899 for prominent local lawyer, judge, and Oregon Supreme Court justice Alfred S. Bennett, the house is the most outstanding and best preserved example of Queen Anne architecture in The Dalles. It later became the home of leading members of the Williams family, a notable local merchant family.

== See also ==
- Joseph D. and Margaret Kelly House
- Hugh Glenn House
- National Register of Historic Places listings in Wasco County, Oregon
