= Hugh Glenn House =

Historic house in Oregon, United States

- U.S. National Register of Historic Places
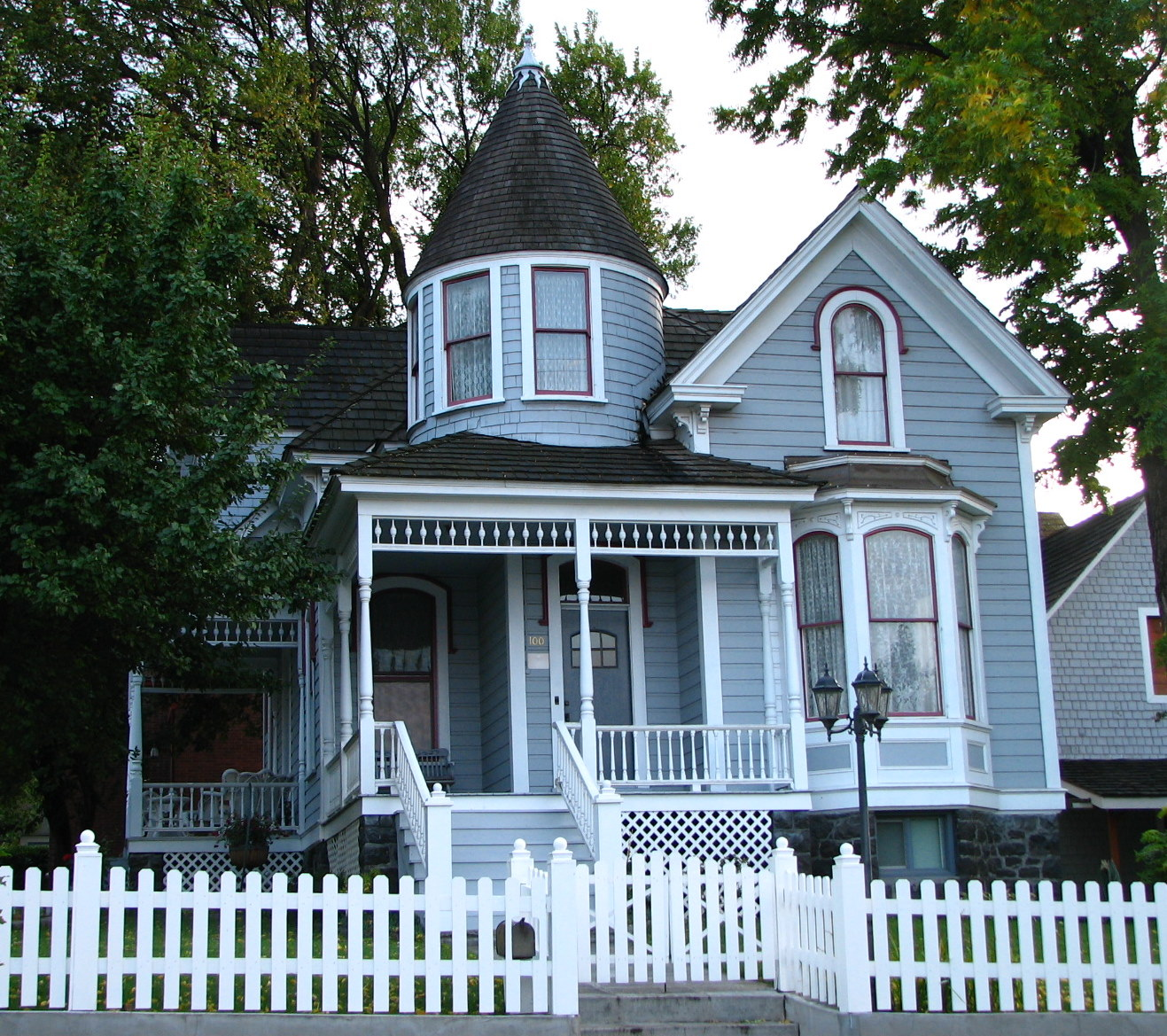
- The Glenn House in 2008

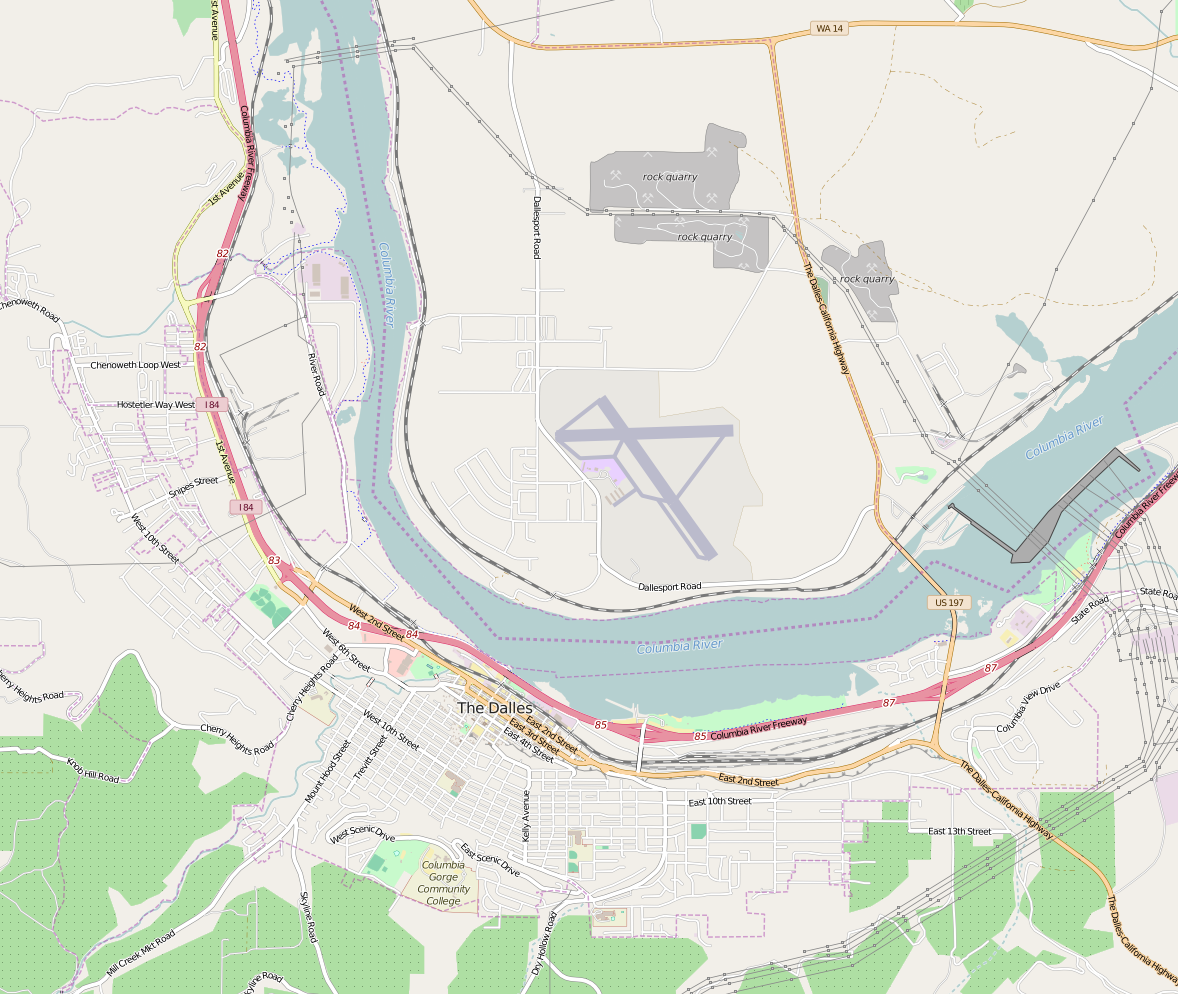
- Location within The Dalles OR
- Location: 100 W. 9th Street; The Dalles, Oregon
- Coordinates: 45°35′52″N 121°11′20″W
- Area: 0.22 acres (0.089 ha)
- Built: 1882
- Architect: Hugh Glenn
- Architectural style: Queen Anne
- NRHP reference No.: 91000064
- Added to NRHP: February 20, 1991

The Hugh Glenn House is a historic house located in The Dalles, Oregon, United States. It is one of the most notable and historically well-preserved Queen Anne-style houses in The Dalles. Hugh Glenn, a prominent architect and businessman in The Dalles, designed and built the house around 1882 and lived there until his death in 1927.

The house was added to the National Register of Historic Places in 1991.

== See also ==
- National Register of Historic Places listings in Wasco County, Oregon
- Bennett–Williams House
- Joseph D. and Margaret Kelly House
