= Edward French House =

Historic house in Oregon, United States

- U.S. National Register of Historic Places
- U.S. Historic district – Contributing property
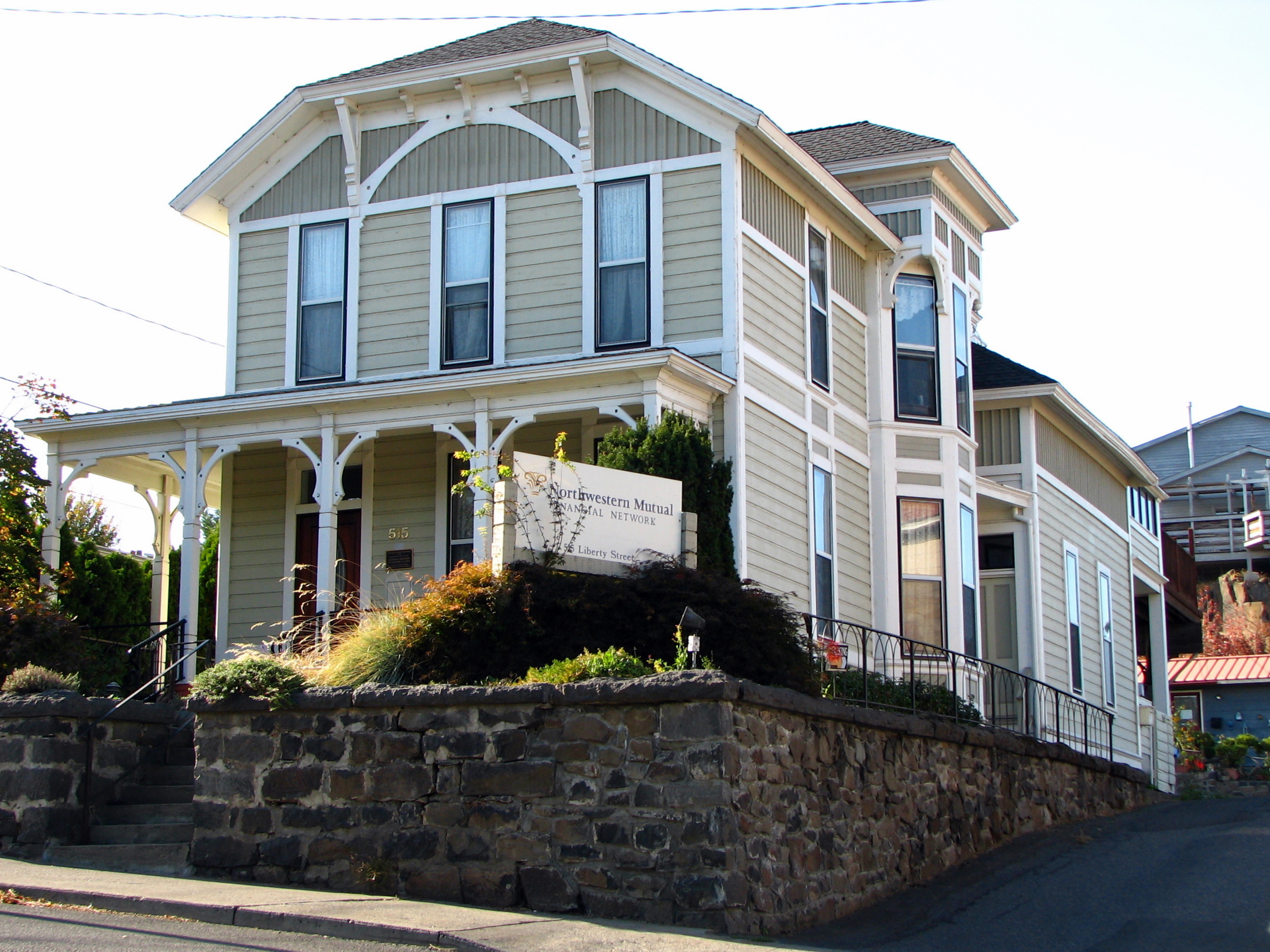
- The French House in 2009

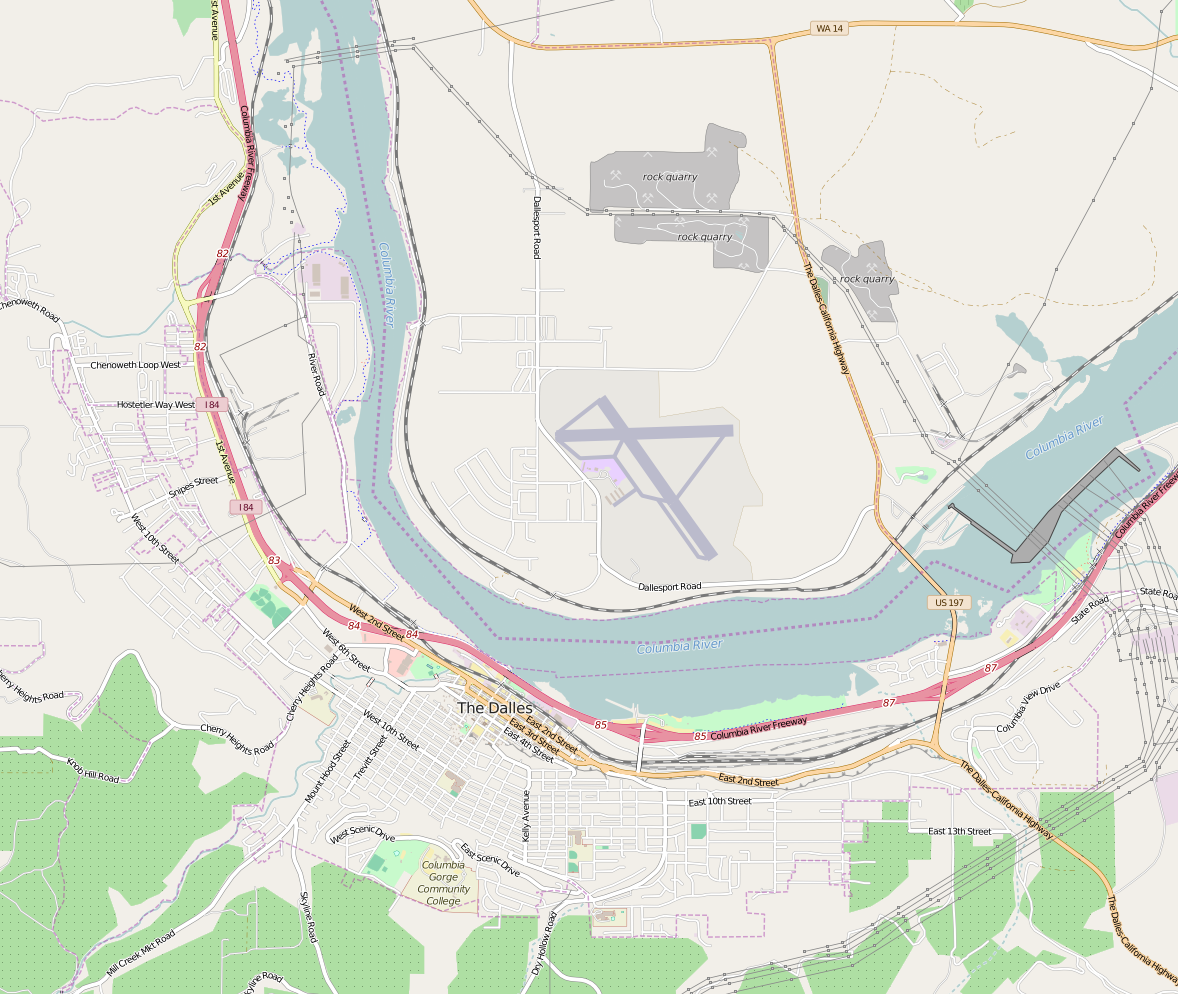
- Location within The Dalles OR
- Location: 515 Liberty Street; The Dalles, Oregon
- Coordinates: 45°36′04″N 121°11′14″W
- Area: 0.19 acres (0.077 ha)
- Built: ca. 1865
- Architectural style: Italianate
- Part of: Trevitt's Addition Historic District (ID95000686)
- NRHP reference No.: 92001319
- Added to NRHP: October 2, 1992

The Edward French House is a historic house located in The Dalles, Oregon, United States. Originally dating from circa 1865, it was acquired by the French family in 1892 and renovated by them in the Italianate style in circa 1900. Edward French, along with his uncle Daniel and other members of the French family, were prominent bankers and businessmen from early The Dalles until the 1920s.

The house was listed on the National Register of Historic Places in 1992.

== See also ==
- National Register of Historic Places listings in Wasco County, Oregon
