= Teter Myers French House =

Historic house in West Virginia, United States

- U.S. National Register of Historic Places
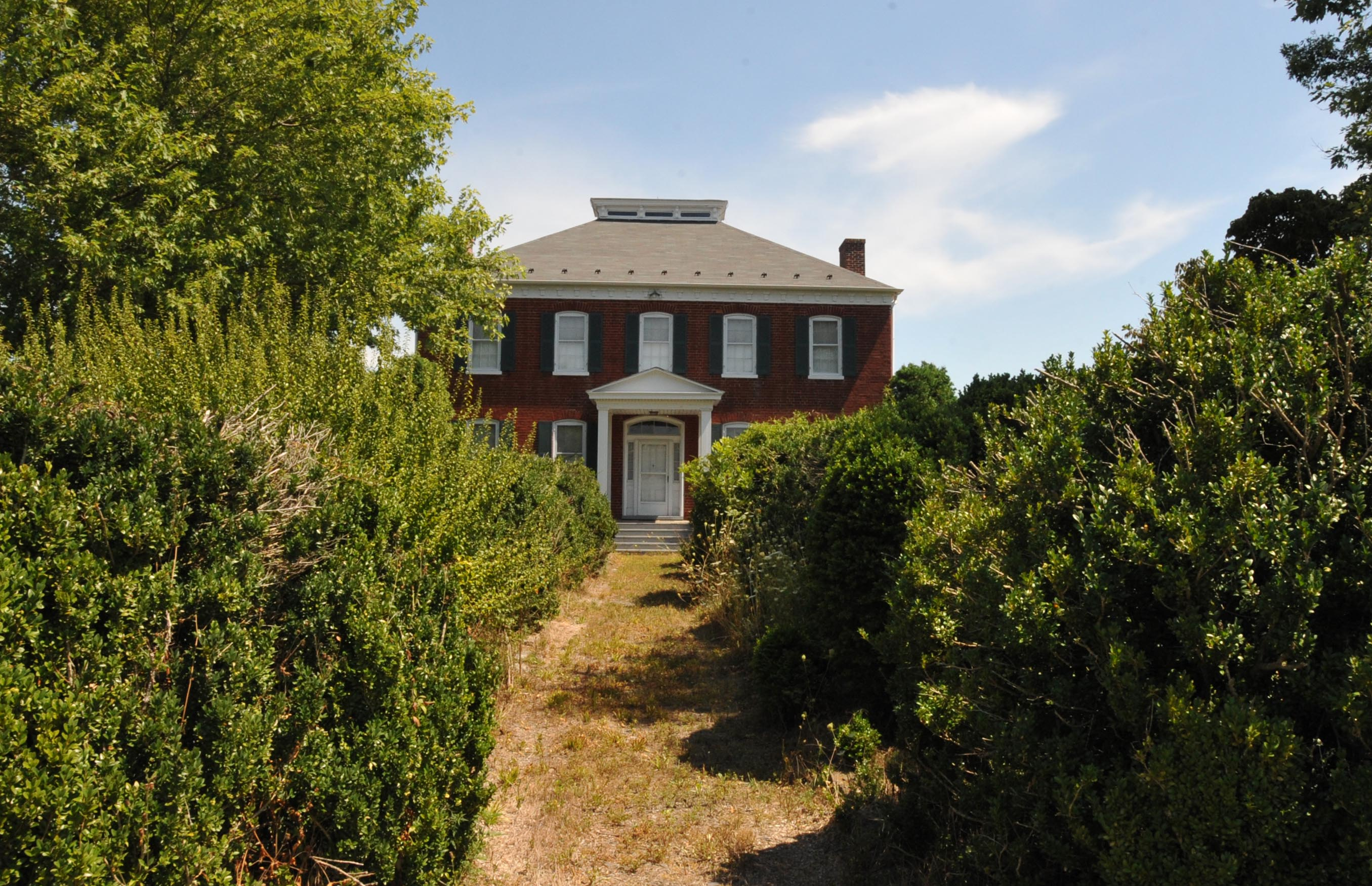

- Location within West Virginia Location within the United States
- Location: Junction of Routes 1 and 3, Hedgesville, West Virginia
- Coordinates: 39°33′57″N 77°58′0″W
- Area: 4 acres (1.6 ha)
- Built: 1860
- Architect: Teter French
- Architectural style: Greek Revival, Victorian
- MPS: Berkeley County MRA
- NRHP reference No.: 80004434
- Added to NRHP: December 10, 1980

Teter Myers French House, also known as Peter Sperow House, is a historic home located near Hedgesville, Berkeley County, West Virginia. It was built in 1860 and is a two / three story, brick dwelling with a stone and brick foundation and hipped roof, situated on a hill. Also on the property is a wash house / root cellar used as slave quarters, corn crib, and barn built into a hillside.

It was listed on the National Register of Historic Places in 1980.
