= Alice French House (Davenport, Iowa) =

Historic house in Iowa, United States

- U.S. National Register of Historic Places
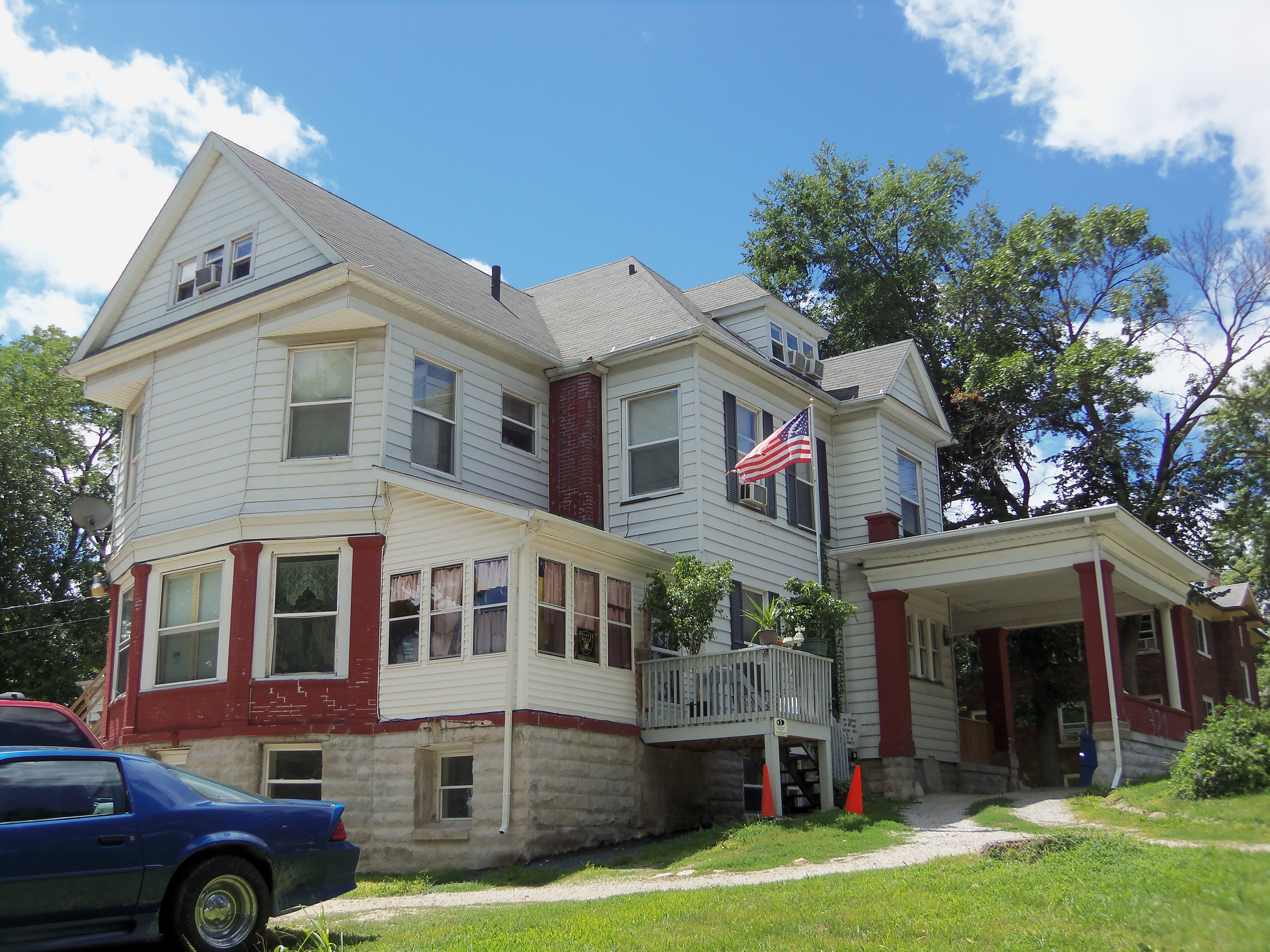

- Location within Iowa Location within the United States
- Location: 321 E. 10th St. Davenport, Iowa
- Coordinates: 41°31′47″N 90°34′13″W
- Area: less than one acre
- Built: 1906
- Architectural style: Queen Anne; Colonial Revival
- MPS: Davenport MRA
- NRHP reference No.: 83002434
- Added to NRHP: July 7, 1983

The Alice French House is a historic building located on a bluff overlooking the Mississippi River on the east side of Davenport, Iowa, United States. It has been listed on the National Register of Historic Places since 1983.

== Alice French ==
George French moved to Davenport from Andover, Massachusetts in 1855 and he served the city as mayor, banker, school board member, and a trustee of the local Unitarian society. His daughter Alice, who was five when the family moved to the Midwest, became the first writer from Iowa with a national reputation. Her first short story appeared in a local newspaper in 1871 and by the 1880s she was being published in The Atlantic and Harper’s. She wrote under the pen name Octave Thanet and her stories became popular in the 1890s and early 1900s.

French was part of an informal literary circle known as the Davenport Writer's Group. Other members included George Cram Cook, Susan Glaspell, Arthur Davison Ficke, Floyd Dell, and Harry Hansen. While most of them had careers away from Davenport, their shared experiences in the city affected their writings. Alice French's work was especially affected by Davenport and life on the Mississippi. She often wrote about life in a western town named Fairport, which was a fictionalized Davenport. She blended realistic details of daily life in the city with romantic ideals. The Man of the Hour (1905), set in Fairport, was her most popular novel.

As literary tastes changed French's work fell out of favor. She abandoned writing and took up social work. She would spend the spring, summer, and autumn in Davenport and the winter in Arkansas.

== Architecture ==
The Alice French House is a rather undistinguished Queen Anne-Colonial Revival combination structure, a style that was popular in Davenport at the turn of the 20th century. It sits on a corner lot that sits diagonally from Sacred Heart Cathedral. It is a large two-story building of wood construction built in 1906. The home was originally a single-family dwelling that has been divided into a multiple-family dwelling. Its significance is due to Alice French residing here rather than the house's architecture.

== See also ==
- Alice French House (Clover Bend, Arkansas)
