= Alice French House (Clover Bend, Arkansas) =

Historic house in Arkansas, United States

- Formerly listed on the U.S. National Register of Historic Places
- Location: AR 28; Clover Bend, Arkansas
- Built: 1896
- NRHP reference No.: 76000425

Significant dates
- Added to NRHP: January 11, 1976
- Removed from NRHP: September 14, 2002

The Alice French House, also known as Thanford, was an historic house located near Clover Bend, Arkansas, United States. It was listed on the National Register of Historic Places in 1976. The house was destroyed by fire in 1986, and was removed from the register in 2002.

== Alice French ==
Born in Andover, Massachusetts, Alice French was five when her family moved to Davenport, Iowa in 1855. She became the first writer from Iowa with a national reputation. Her first short story appeared in a local newspaper in 1871 and by the 1880s she was being published in The Atlantic and Harper’s. She wrote under the pen name Octave Thanet and her stories became popular in the 1890s and early 1900s.

French, along with her widowed friend Jane Allen Crawford, spent their winters at Clover Bend Plantation in Lawrence County, Arkansas from 1883 to 1909. French expanded on the regionalist themes she started in Iowa with stories about the people in the Clover Bend area. She used the poor black and white sharecroppers as the subjects for her stories.

As literary tastes changed French's work fell out of favor. She abandoned writing and took up social work. She died in Davenport in 1934.

== Thanford ==
French and Crawford originally lived in a cabin on the plantation. It was destroyed in a fire in 1895 and they built Thanford in 1896 along the Black River. It was a three-story, fifteen room house, and its name is a combination of Alice French's (Thanet, from her pen name) and June Allen Crawford's last names. The estate was landscaped with shrubs imported from England. The stables housed fine horses and an elegant carriage.

The house was the setting for their literary and social activities. French's study was on the top floor of the house, where she had a commanding view of the river. They entertained many well known people, including Theodore Roosevelt, with fine dining and wines. French also created a woodworking shop, where she built shelves and simple furniture, and a darkroom, where she developed and printed her own photographs.

== See also ==
- Alice French House (Davenport, Iowa)
