= Banana pudding =

Dessert made from banana

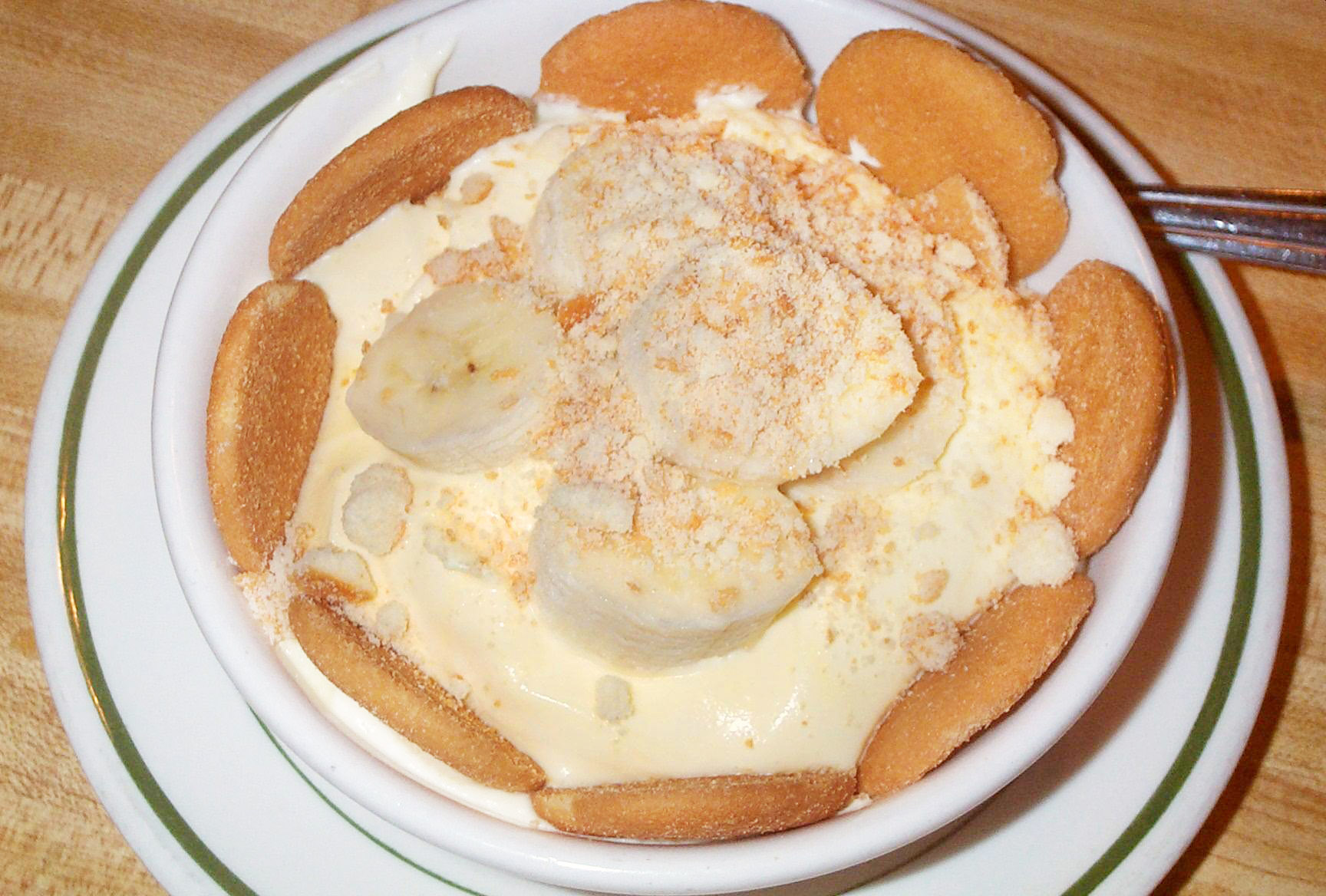
- Banana pudding served in a bowl with vanilla wafers
- Type: Pudding
- Course: Dessert
- Place of origin: United States
- Region or state: Southern United States
- Main ingredients: Bananas, Vanilla Wafers or ladyfingers, custard, vanilla flavoring

Banana pudding is a Southern United States dessert generally consisting of layers of sweet vanilla-flavored custard, vanilla wafers or ladyfingers, and sliced fresh bananas which are assembled in a dish and served topped with whipped cream or meringue.

It is commonly associated with Southern US cuisine, but it can be found around the country in specific areas.

== Ingredients and preparation ==
A typical method for making banana pudding is to repeatedly layer the bananas, custard, and wafers into a dish and top with whipped cream or meringue. Over time, the wafers will absorb the custard and the layers will combine, causing the flavors to intermingle.

== History ==
Recipes for banana pudding became very popular in the 1890s across the US, with the sponge cake approach being the most popular.

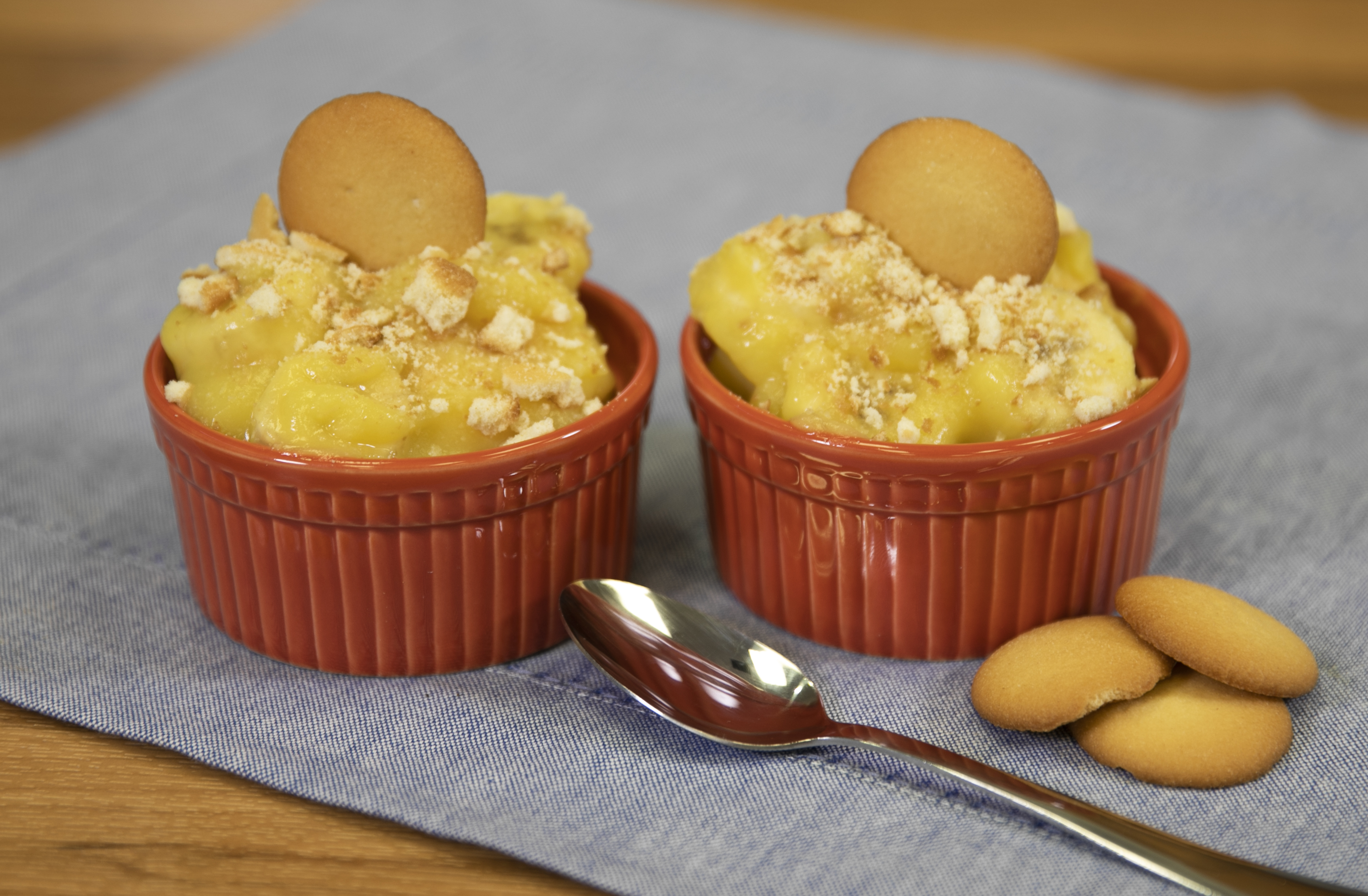
Individually portioned banana pudding

In 1920, the use of vanilla wafers instead of ladyfingers first appeared, first seen in a recipe from Mrs. Laura Kerley in a Bloomington, Illinois local newspaper, The Pantagraph. Following the rise in popularity of using wafers, in the 1940s the National Biscuit Company (later known as Nabisco) began printing a recipe for banana pudding on the Nilla Wafers box, whose marketing helped further boost the dessert's acclaim.

It is clear that banana pudding did not begin with the strong ties to the Southern US that it maintains today, although there is no consensus on how the Southern identity developed. Some have theorized that it developed naturally through large gatherings such as church picnics, family reunions, and barbecues, because the dessert is easy to scale up, requires no cooking, and keeps well.

== National Banana Pudding Festival ==
The National Banana Pudding Festival is held at the Centerville River Park in Centerville, Tennessee. It is a 2-day event held on the first weekend of October.

== Similar dishes ==
- Banana cream pie, a dish of Southern cuisine that includes bananas and custard in a prebaked pie crust, topped with whipped cream
- Trifle, a dish in English cuisine that combines fruit and custard layered with sponge cake and topped with whipped cream

== See also ==
Media related to Banana pudding at Wikimedia Commons

- Banana bread
- Banana custard
- Bananas Foster
- Bánh chuối
- List of banana dishes
- List of custard desserts
- Summer pudding
- Tipsy cake
