= Banana cake (disambiguation) =

Banana cake is a cake prepared using bananas.

Banana cake may also refer to:

- Banana bread, a type of bread that is made with mashed bananas
- Banana roll, a common Chinese or Hongkonger pastry
