= Tamarind Tree (restaurant) =

Vietnamese restaurant in Seattle, Washington, U.S.

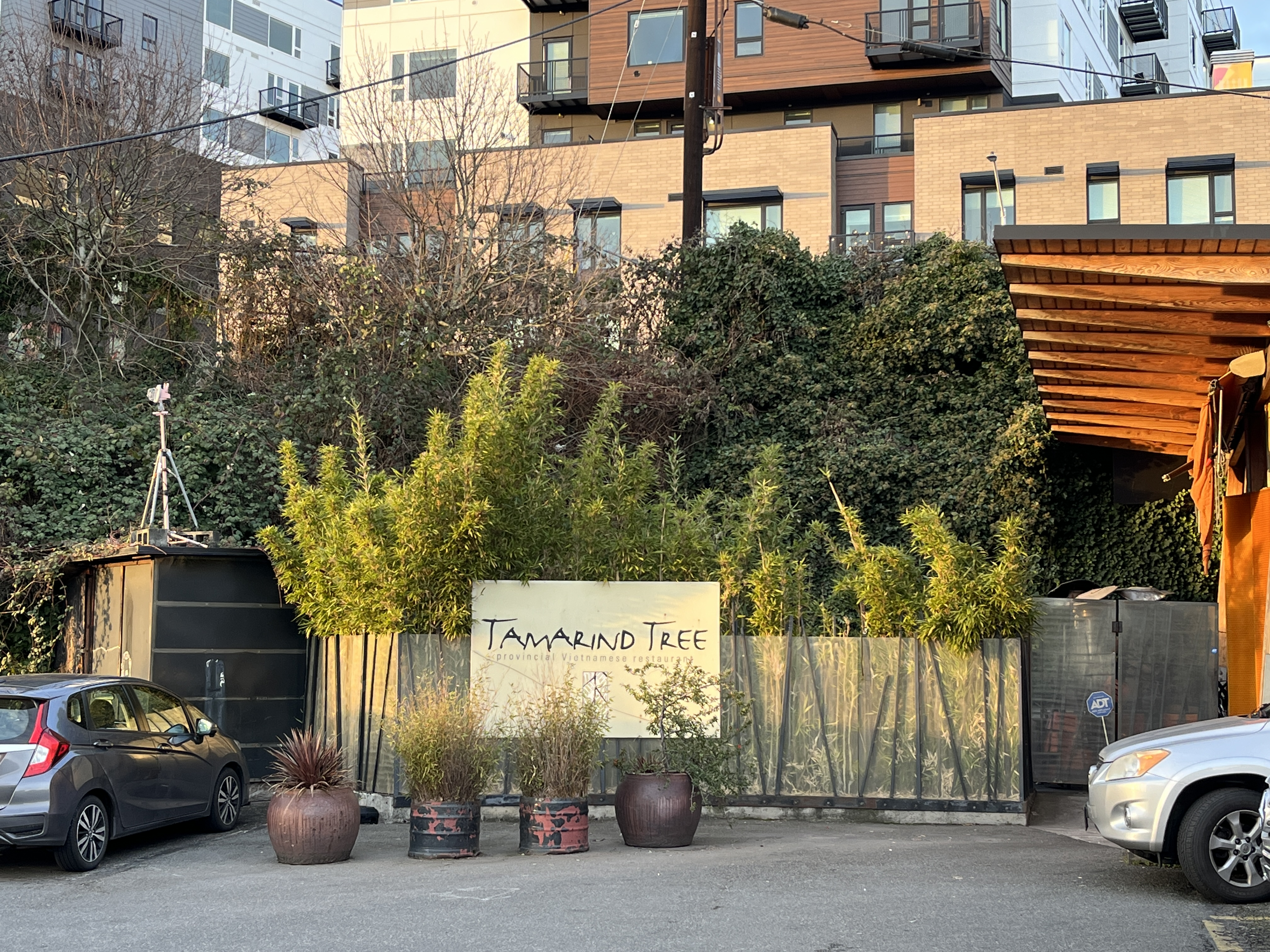
- The restaurant's exterior, 2023
- Interactive map of Tamarind Tree

Restaurant information
- Established: 2004
- Owner: Tam Nguyen
- Food type: Vietnamese
- Location: 1036 S Jackson Street, Seattle, King, Washington, 98104, United States
- Coordinates: 47.5998°N 122.3178°W
- Website: tamarindtreerestaurant.com

Tamarind Tree is a Vietnamese restaurant in Seattle, in the U.S. state of Washington.

== Description ==
The Vietnamese restaurant Tamarind Tree is located in Seattle's Chinatown-International District. The menu has included muc nhoi thit (grilled squid with ground pork), banh mi hap (steamed baguette), and green mango salad. The spring rolls have fried tofu, peanuts, coconut, jicama, carrots, and herbs. The restaurant has also served bánh xèo, pho, clams with pineapple anchovy sauce, steamed prawn coconut rice cakes, banana cake, and coconut milk. The green papaya salad has prawns, jicama, and roasted peanuts.

Fodor's says, "Wildly popular with savvy diners from all across the city, this Vietnamese haunt on the eastern side of the I.D. really doesn't look like much from the outside, especially because the entrance is through a grungy parking lot (which it shares with Sichuanese Cuisine restaurant), but once you're inside, the elegantly simple, large, and warm space is extremely welcoming... Service is attentive, but the waits can be long, even with reservations."

== History ==
Tam Nguyen, the owner and founder of Tamarind Tree, arrived in the United States as an immigrant from a Malaysian refugee camp in October 1980. Nguyen opened the restaurant in late 2004; he opened a separate restaurant in Downtown Seattle named Long in January 2009. Tamarind Tree will expand to Capitol Hill by the end of 2023, taking over and renovating the 1917 building that was previously home to R Place, a gay bar that shuttered in 2021.

The restaurant was the site of a Shigellosis outbreak in January 2023, with 32 patrons falling ill as a result; it was subsequently closed for cleaning and disinfection from January 24 until February 7.

== Reception ==
In 2011, Allecia Vermillion included Tamarind Tree in Eater Seattle lists of 38 "essential" Seattle restaurants. Shalini Gujavarty selected the restaurant for similar lists in 2012. The website's Jenise Silva included the green papaya salad in a 2018 list of "11 Sumptuous Salads in Seattle". In 2020, during the COVID-19 pandemic, Gabe Guarente included Tamarind Tree in Eater Seattle's overview of "where to get fantastic Vietnamese food in Seattle for takeout and delivery". Writers for the site also included the restaurant in a 2022 list of 15 "lively Seattle restaurants for big group dinners". Tamarind Tree was included in The Infatuation's 2025 list of the 25 best restaurants in the Chinatown–International District.

== See also ==
- List of Vietnamese restaurants
- Vietnamese in Seattle
