= Monsoon (restaurant) =

- Interactive map of Monsoon

Restaurant information
- Established: 1999
- Owner: Sophie Banh
- Head chef: Sophie Banh
- Food type: Vietnamese
- Location: 615 19th Avenue East, Seattle, King, Washington, 98112, United States
- Coordinates: 47°37′29.5″N 122°18′27.5″W
- Other locations: Bellevue
- Website: monsoonrestaurants.com

Monsoon is a Vietnamese restaurant with two locations in the Seattle metropolitan area, in the U.S. state of Washington.

== Description ==
In 2016, Keiko Sagami of KING-TV said Monsoon serves "traditional Vietnamese cuisine blended with Pacific Northwest innovation". Fodor's says of the Capitol Hill restaurant: "Upscale fare blends Vietnamese and Pacific Northwest elements, including wild gulf prawns with lemongrass, catfish clay pot with fresh coconut juice and green onion, and lamb with fermented soybeans and sweet onions. Homemade ice creams include lychee and mango, but the restaurant's most famous dessert is the coconut crème caramel." The menu has also included dim sum, drunken chicken, and banana cake.

== History ==
Siblings Eric and Sophie Banh opened the original restaurant, sometimes referred to as Monsoon Seattle, on Capitol Hill in 1999. The duo opened a second location in Bellevue in December 2008.

== Reception ==
Emma Banks included the original restaurant in Thrillist's 2022 overview of "The Best Patios for Eating and Drinking Outside in Seattle". She and Bradley Foster also included the Capitol Hill location in a 2022 list of "The Absolute Best Rooftop Bars in Seattle".

Leonardo David Raymundo and Ryan Lee included the restaurant in Eater Seattle's 2022 list of "14 Delightful Dim Sum Restaurants in the Seattle Area". Brett Bankson included the Bellevue restaurant in a 2022 list of "20 Restaurants Showcasing the Eastside's Multicultural Dining Scene". Jay Friedman included Monsoon in Eater Seattle's 2022 list of 18 "vibrant" Vietnamese restaurants in the city. Gabe Guarente, Mark Van Streefkerk, and Jade Yamazaki Stewart included the business in a 2022 list of 25 "essential" Capitol Hill restaurants.

Allecia Vermillion included Monsoon in Seattle Metropolitan's 2022 list of Seattle's best Vietnamese restaurants.

== See also ==
- List of Vietnamese restaurants
- Vietnamese in Seattle
