= Hello Em =

Vietnamese coffee shop in Seattle, Washington, U.S.

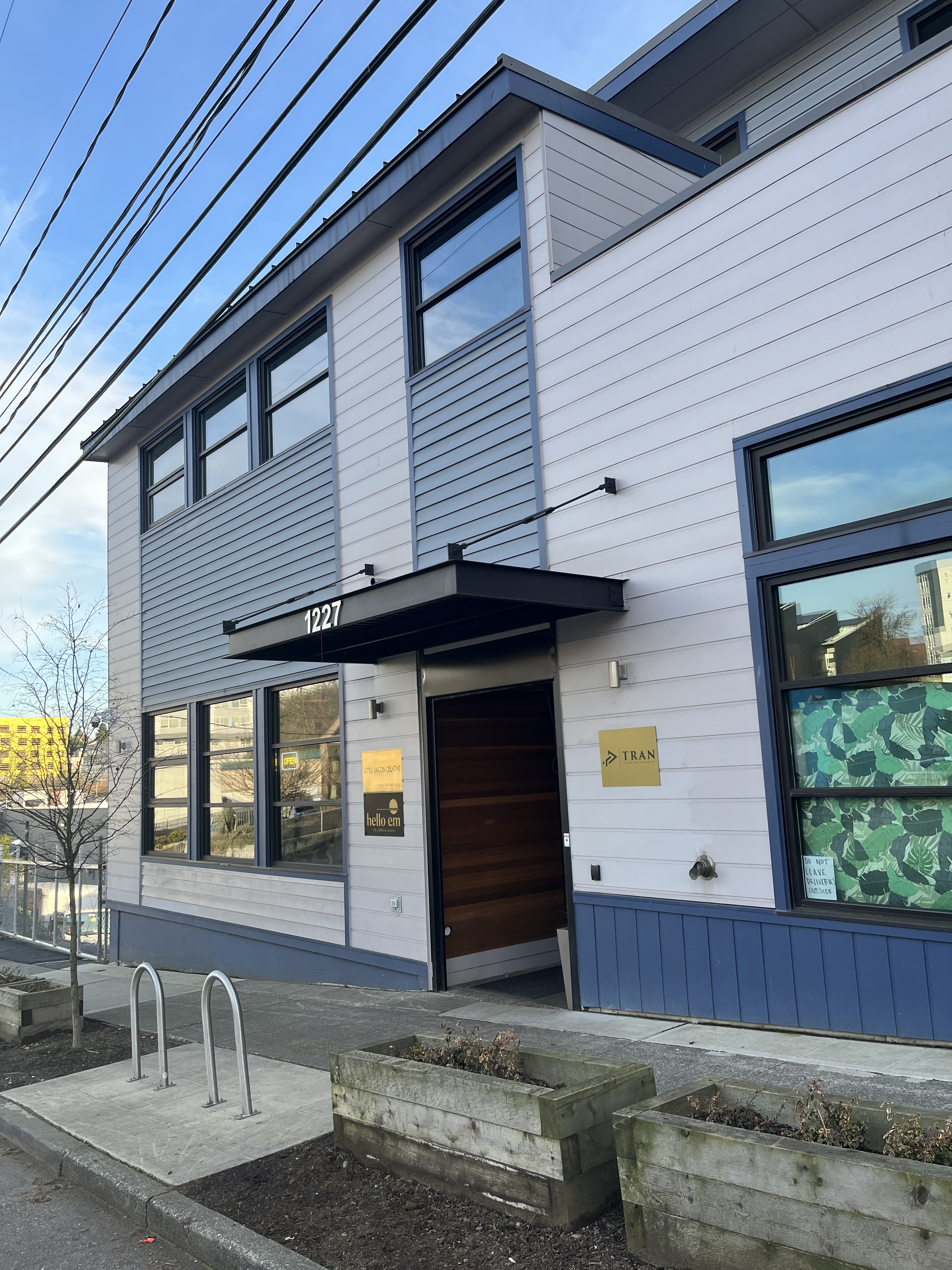
- Entrance exterior, 2023
- Interactive map of Hello Em

Restaurant information
- Location: 1227 South Weller Street, Seattle, King, Washington, 98144, United States
- Coordinates: 47.5973°N 122.3155°W

Hello Em Việt Coffee & Roastery, or simply Hello Em, is a Vietnamese coffee shop in Seattle, in the U.S. state of Washington.

== Description ==
Hello Em is a "sleek" Vietnamese coffee shop on Weller Street in the Little Saigon area of Seattle's Chinatown-International District. The Seattle Times has described Hello Em as an "artisanal coffeehouse". The business' name was inspired by a greeting used in Vietnam.

Hello Em shares the space with Friends of Little Sài Gòn within the Little Saigon Creative, which offers programming for the local Vietnamese community and has an art gallery, a community library, and an area for events and meetings. An interior wall displays historical facts about Little Saigon. A coffee roaster operates inside the front entrance, "so customers can watch the beans go from pale green to shimmering brown as they wait for their drinks", according to Naomi Tomky of the Seattle Post-Intelligencer. Beans sourced from Vietnamese are roasted on-site using a Neuhaus Neotec air roaster.

=== Menu ===
The cà phê brûlée is coffee with egg cream, topped with torched sugar. The cà phê chuoi has caramelized banana, coconut, and an egg cloud with salted peanuts and banana chips, and the cà phê my dua is an iced coffee with a coconut cloud, pandan dust, and sesame seeds. In addition to coffee drinks, the menu has included bánh mì, a Seattle Dog-inspired hot dog made with Laughing Cow cheese, pastries, and "cloud mochi" (mochi balls with fruit, Oreo cookies, and whipped cream). A breakfast sandwich version of bánh mì has pâté, pork charcuterie, fried shallots, and lemongrass sauce.

== History ==
Hello Em began operating in January 2021, hosting a grand opening on January 24. The business is owned by Nghia Bui and Yenvy Pham, a co-owner of Phở Bắc and Phởcific Standard Time. Hello Em is Seattle's first Vietnamese coffee roastery, according to the South Seattle Emerald.

In 2022, employees of Hello Em attended a "special personal safety and de-escalation training" by the city's crime prevention team, and sought help from authorities to clear a nearby homeless camp.

== Reception ==
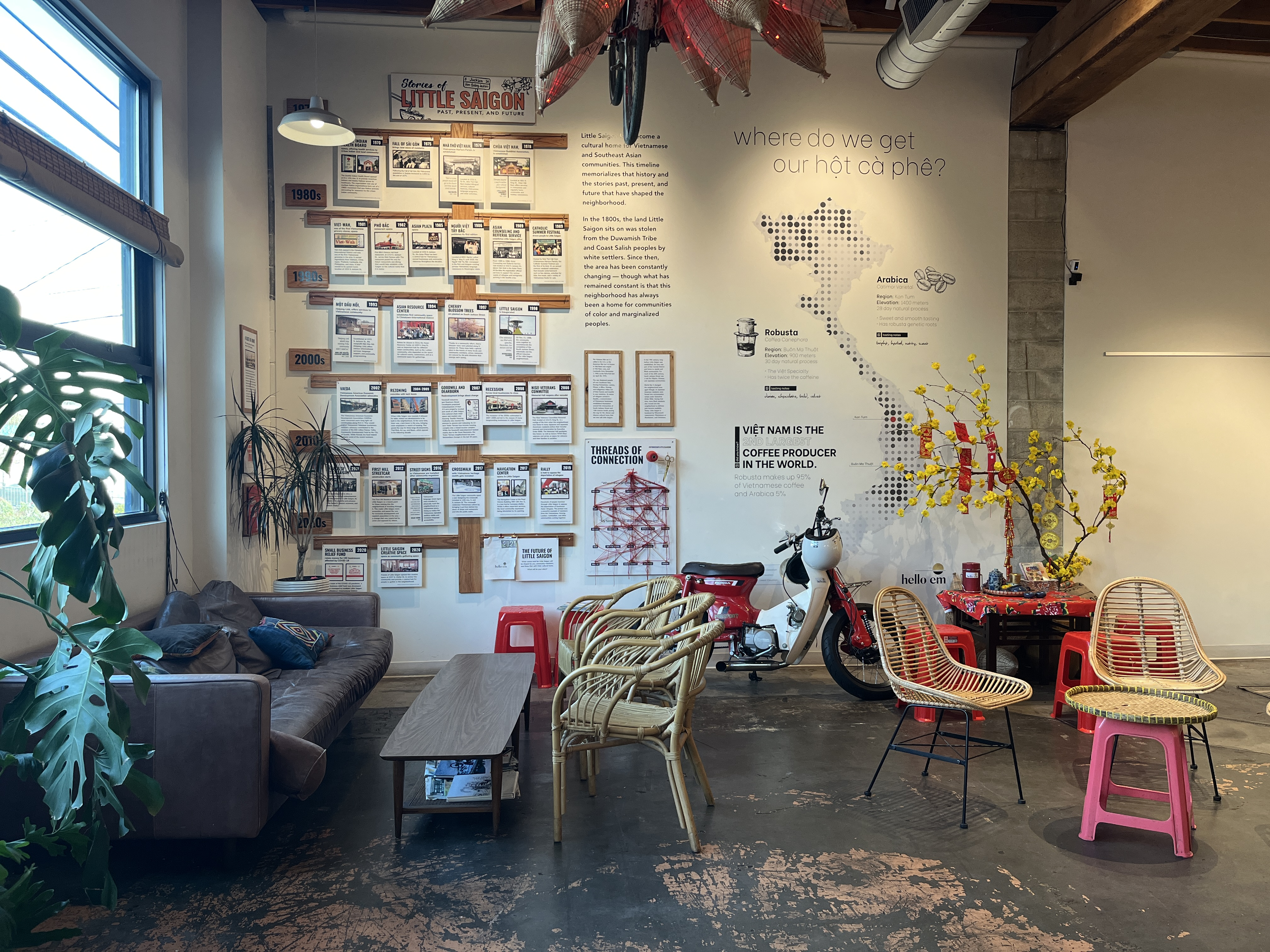
Interior in 2023

Naomi Tomky included the egg cloud and egg crème coffee in the Seattle Post-Intelligencer's 2021 list of 12 of the city's "most exciting, interesting egg dishes". She also recommended a visit to Hello Em in a 2022 travel guide of Seattle published by Condé Nast Traveler. Megan Hill recommended the breakfast bánh mì and cloud mochi in Eater Seattle's 2021 list of the city's "best coffee shop bites", in which she said, "The food menu is outstanding — and photogenic." The website's Mark Van Streefkerk also included Hello Em in a 2022 list of the city's "essential" coffee shops.

In 2022, Allecia Vermillion included Hello Em in Seattle Metropolitan's overview of a dozen "destination" coffee shops, and Tasting Table included the business in a list of the 17 "best coffee roasters in Seattle that aren't Starbucks". Megan Seling included the cà phê chuoi in The Stranger's 2023 overview of Seattle's "best bites" for ten dollars or less.

== See also ==
- List of Vietnamese restaurants
- Vietnamese in Seattle
