= Phở Bắc =

Chain of Vietnamese restaurants in the U.S. state of Washington

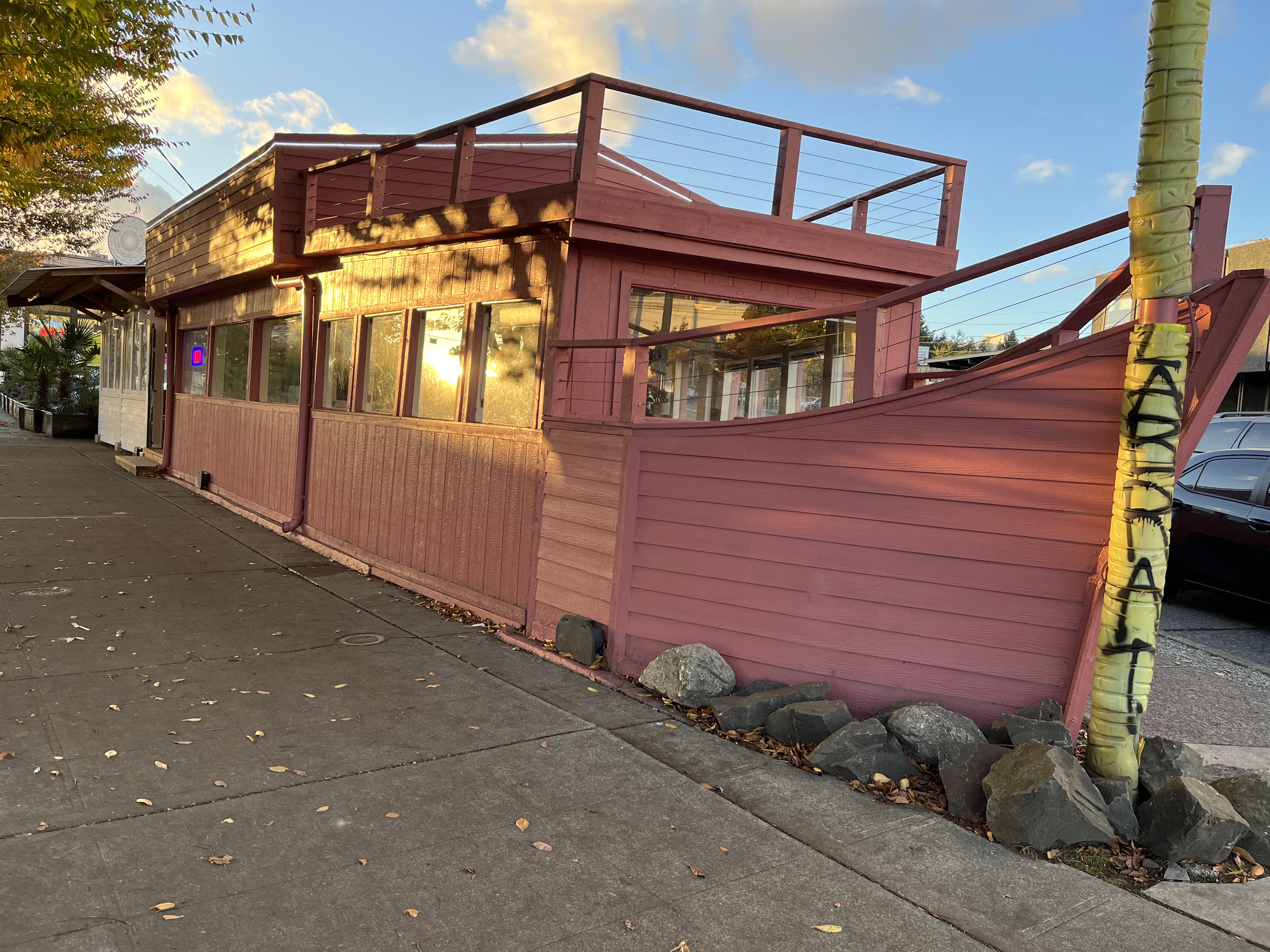
- Exterior of the boat-shaped restaurant, 2022

Restaurant information
- Established: 1982
- Owners: Khoa Pham; Quynh-Vy Pham; Yenvy Pham
- Previous owners: Augustine Nien Pham; Theresa Cat Vu
- Food type: Vietnamese
- Location: Seattle, Washington, United States
- Website: thephobac.com

Phở Bắc is a chain of Vietnamese restaurants in Seattle, in the U.S. state of Washington. The restaurants specialize in phở dishes and have several locations in the city.

== History and locations ==
The restaurant, originally named Cat's Submarine Sandwich Shop, was founded in 1982 by Theresa Cat Vu and Augustine Nien Pham in the Chinatown–International District. The shop operated out of a former insurance office in modern-day Little Saigon and offered sandwiches until Vu and Pham were convinced to sell phở by members of Seattle's Vietnamese community; at the time, they claimed to be the first Seattle restaurant to offer the dish. Four months after introducing phở to the menu, the dish became the main focus of the restaurant, which was renamed Phở Bắc.

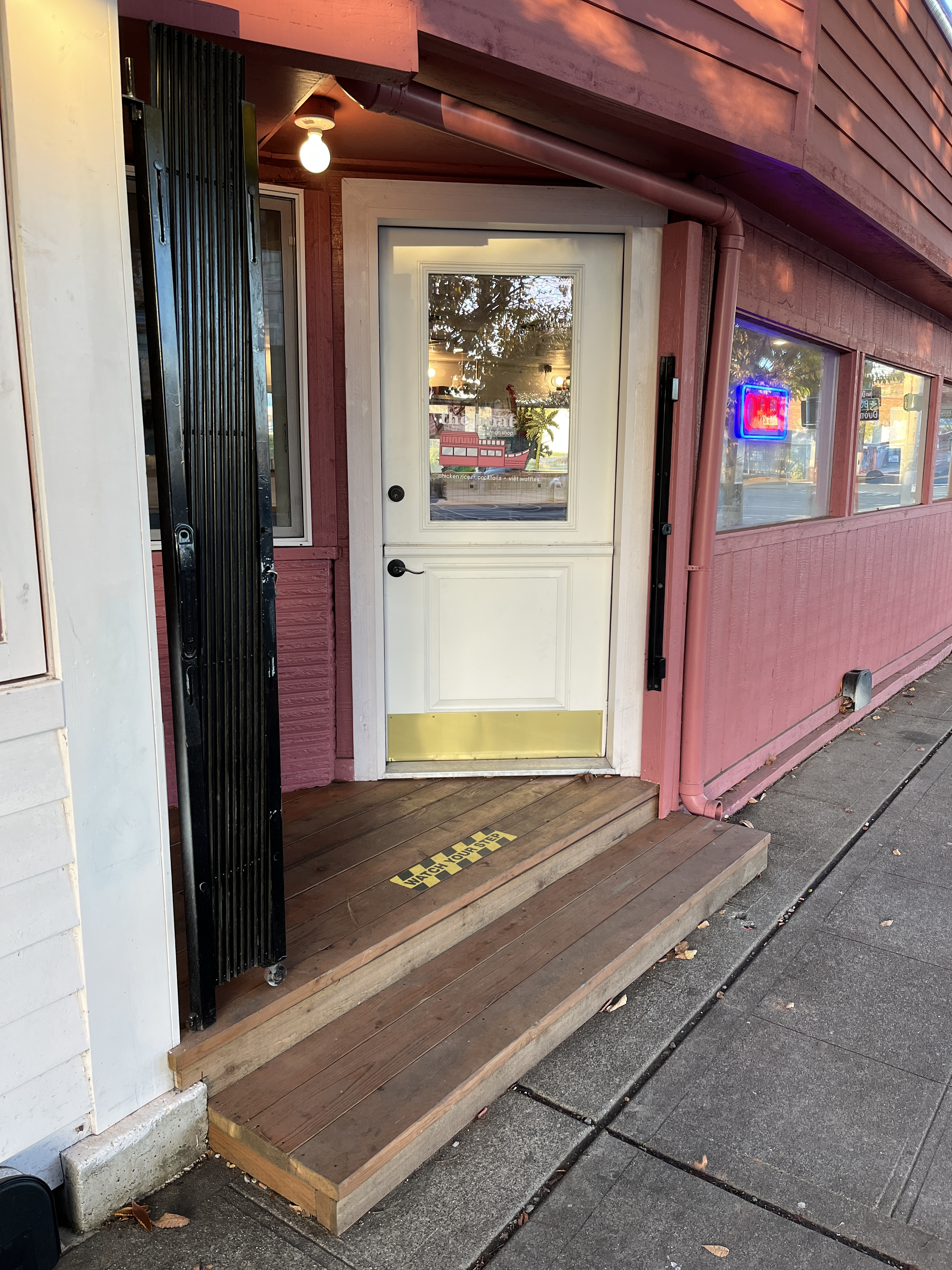
Entrance to boat-shaped original restaurant, 2022

The Pham family opened additional locations under the Phở Bắc name, as well as Phở Việt. The original restaurant at 12th Avenue and South Jackson Street was moved into a red boat-shaped building that was originally a float attachment used for a 2004 parade organized by the Vietnamese Catholic community. In 2012, a Denny Triangle location opened. An additional store is in Rainier Valley.

Phở Bắc Súp Shop opened nearby on January 1, 2018, slightly later than previously announced. The restaurant initially featured the wine shop Vita Uva, which closed by September and was converted into a wine club. The original restaurant became known as Phở Bắc Boat, or The Boat. Phở Bắc Boat closed temporarily for renovations in November 2018, reopening on January 1, 2020.

In 2020, during the COVID-19 pandemic, the business launched the Pho Mobile to deliver food. Phở Bắc opened a restaurant on 7th Avenue in Downtown Seattle, with an upstairs bar called Phởcific Standard Time, in 2021.

== Reception ==
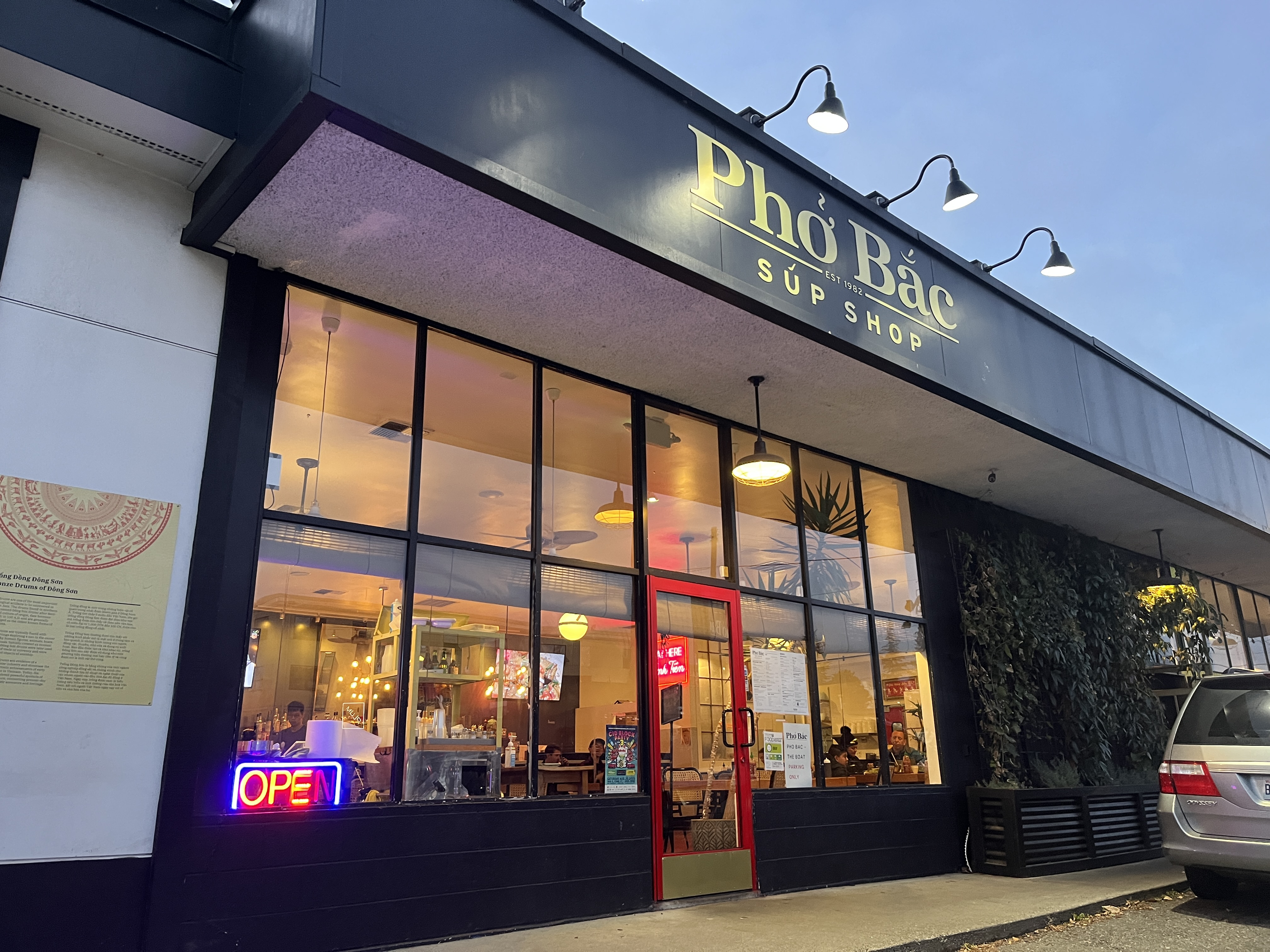
Exterior of Phở Bắc Súp Shop in 2022

A review from Condé Nast Traveler says, "In a city swimming in good pho, the bowls here are simply some of the best."

Gabe Guarente included the Chinatown–International District establishments in Eater Seattle's 2020 list of twelve "solid" restaurants in Seattle "where parking isn't a complete nightmare". During the pandemic, he also recommended Phở Bắc Súp Shop in 2020 overviews of the city's best delivery and take-out options. Eater Seattle included the restaurant in a 2021 list of "where to get comforting bowls of soups and stews for wintry Seattle weather", as well as a 2022 list of "where to get soothing bowls of pho in the Seattle area". Jay Friedman included Phở Bắc Súp Shop in Eater Seattle's 2022 lists of eighteen "vibrant" Vietnamese Restaurants in Seattle and nineteen "knockout" restaurants in the Chinatown–International District. In 2022, the restaurant was included in Eater Seattle's 2022 list of thirty-eight "essential" Seattle restaurants, and writers for the site included Phở Bắc Súp Shop in an overview of fifteen "lively" restaurants in the city for large group dinners.

In 2023, Phở Bắc Sup Shop, Phởcific Standard Time, and The Boat made Yenvy and Quynh Pham semifinalists in the James Beard Foundation Award's Outstanding Restaurateur category. Phở Bắc and The Boat were included in The Infatuation's 2025 list of the 25 best restaurants in the Chinatown–International District.

== See also ==
- Hello Em
- List of restaurant chains in the United States
- List of Vietnamese restaurants
- Vietnamese in Seattle
