= Saigon Deli =

Vietnamese restaurant in Seattle, Washington, U.S.

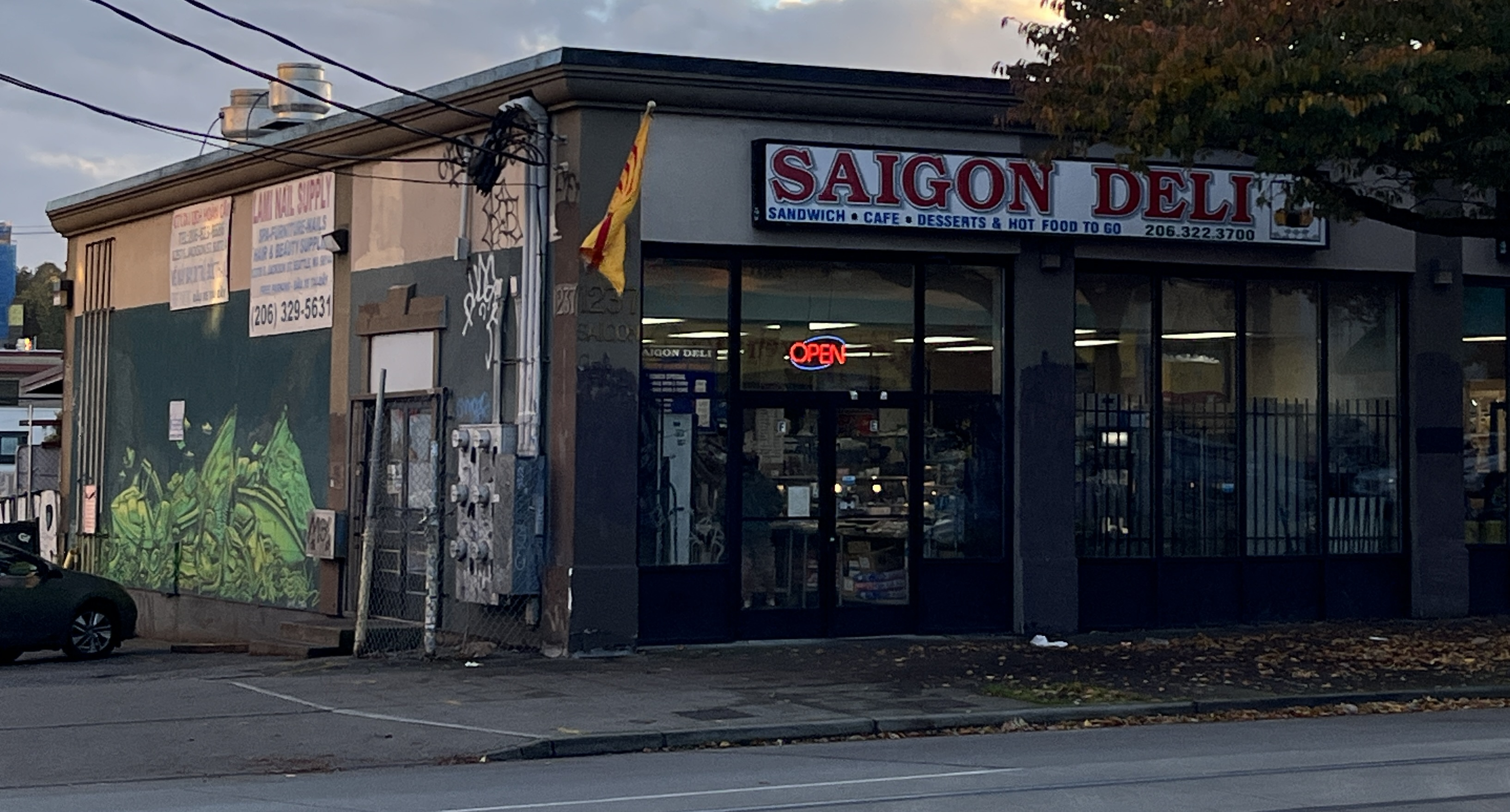
- The shop's exterior, 2023
- Interactive map of Saigon Deli

Restaurant information
- Food type: Vietnamese
- Location: 1237 S Jackson Street, Seattle, Washington, 98144, United States
- Coordinates: 47.5990°N 122.3155°W

Saigon Deli is a Vietnamese restaurant in Seattle, in the U.S. state of Washington.

== Description ==
Saigon Deli is a Vietnamese restaurant. According to Thrillist, "This hole in the wall is a one-stop shop for everything ranging from bánh mìs and curry chicken to bubble tea and all kinds of prepackaged snacks." Most known for its bánh mì, the restaurant has also served banh bo nuong, barbecue pork sandwich, beef stew, stuffed bitter melon, coconut chicken, catfish, pork meatballs, and spring rolls. The restaurant does not offer seating.

== Reception ==
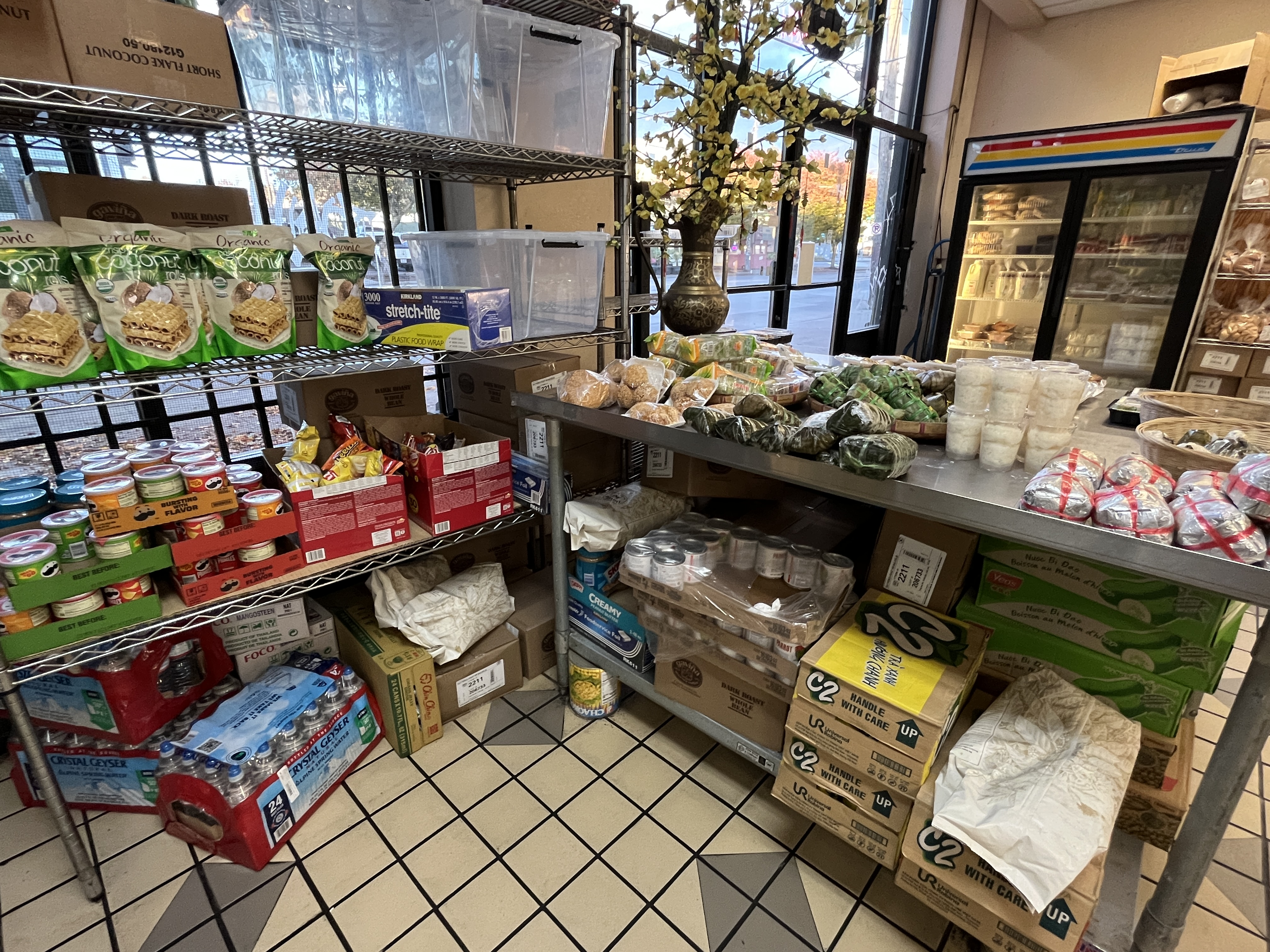
Interior in 2022

Julien Perry included the business in Eater Seattle's 2013 lists of "The 38 Essential Restaurants" and "Handy Guide to Seattle's 18 Iconic Sandwiches". The website's Gabe Guarente included Saigon Deli in a 2015 overview of "Where to Get Fantastic Vietnamese Food in Seattle for Takeout and Delivery". Jay Friedman included the restaurant in a 2021 overview of "Where to Get Some Great Banh Mi in the Seattle Area".

Chona Kasinger included the restaurant in Thrillist's 2014 list of "The 15 best places to eat in Seattle's International District". Kara Tiernan of The Stranger included Saigon Deli in a 2018 list of "Our Favorite Vietnamese Restaurants in Seattle". Writers for the newspaper included the barbecue pork bánh mì in a 2020 list of "The Cheapest Eats in Seattle". Rich Smith said "it's probably the best $5.00 you can spend in the city" and wrote, "Few places in Seattle make you feel like you live in an actual city. Saigon Deli is one of them." Allecia Vermillion included Saigon Deli in Seattle Metropolitan's 2022 list of "The Best Vietnamese Restaurants in Seattle". Saigon Deli was included in The Infatuation's 2025 list of the 25 best restaurants in the Chinatown–International District.

== See also ==
- List of Vietnamese restaurants
- Vietnamese in Seattle
