= Phin (restaurant) =

Vietnamese coffee shop in Seattle, US

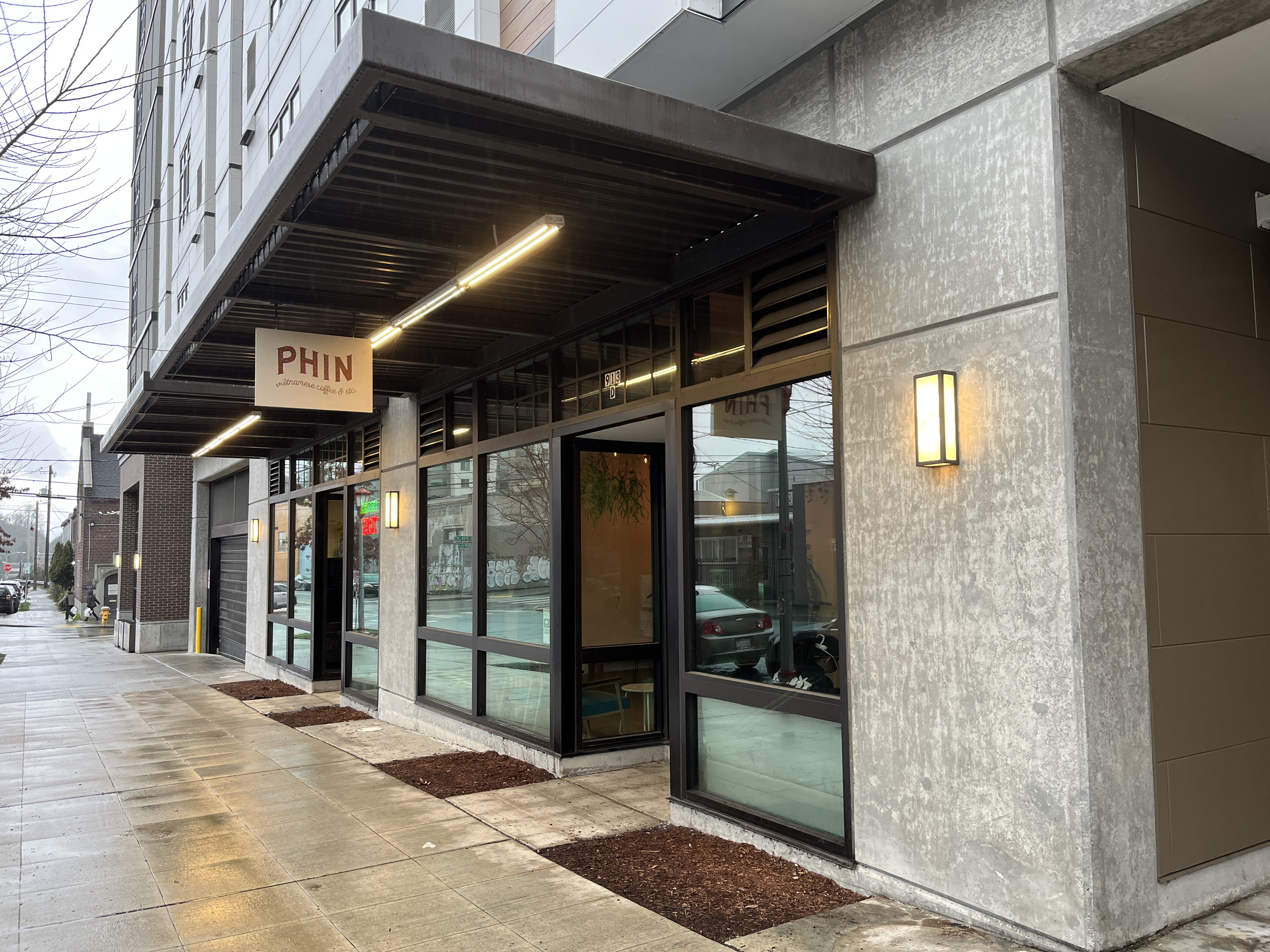
- The coffee shop's exterior in 2023
- Interactive map of Phin

Restaurant information
- Established: October 2020
- Owner: Bao Nguyen
- Location: 913 South Jackson Street, Suite D, Seattle, King, Washington, 98104, United States
- Coordinates: 47.5988°N 122.3198°W
- Website: phinseattle.com

Phin Vietnamse Coffee & Etc, or simply Phin, is a Vietnamese coffee shop in Seattle's Chinatown–International District, in the U.S. state of Washington. Owner Bao Nguyen opened the cafe in October 2020.

== Description ==
The 620-square-foot Vietnamese coffee shop Phin, which uses and is named after the coffee filter of the same name, operates in the Thai Binh apartment building on South Jackson Street, in the Little Saigon part of Seattle's Chinatown–International District. The Seattle Times has described the shop as "inviting", "small", "stylish", and "tranquil", with a faux balcony in one interior corner. According to Naomi Tomky of the Seattle Post-Intelligencer, "The stylish inside manages to evoke both Vietnam and another era through muted colors on the wall, painted red details, and a decorative balcony, but also through design."

The menu includes cà phê sữa chua (yogurt coffee), which is coffee and whole-milk yogurt with condensed milk, as well as cà phê cốt dừa (coconut slushie coffee). Other drinks include black sesame coffee and a pandan latte. The food menu includes banh kep la dua (Vietnamese-style pandan waffles), which have been described as Phin's "signature" snack. Among other desserts is flan with shaved coffee ice. The diary and oat condensed milks are made in-house.

== History ==
Phin opened in October 2020. Bao Nguyen is an owner. He and Hanh Hoang began selling pandan waffles at the Chinatown–International District Night Market in 2019, and have continued to be a vendor at the event via Phin. Phin sources coffee beans from Austin, Texas-based Phin Coffee Club.

== Reception ==
In 2021, Allecia Vermillion included the pandan waffles in Seattle Metropolitan's overview of the best things she ate in 2021.

== See also ==
- List of Vietnamese restaurants
- Vietnamese in Seattle
