= Nilla Wafers =

Brand name cookie

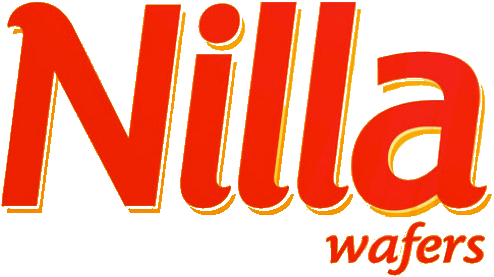

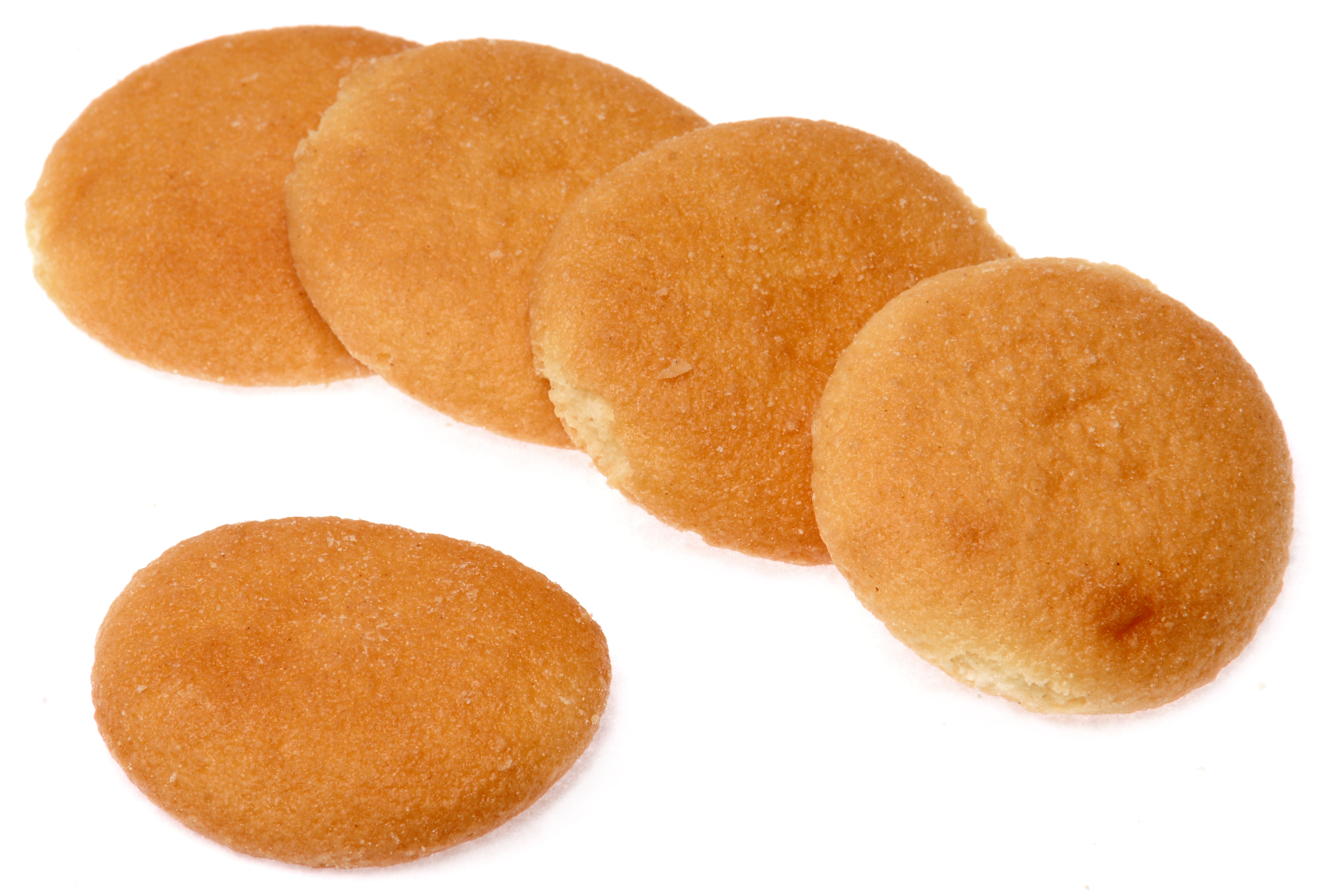
- Product type: Cookie
- Current owner: Mondelez International
- Country: U.S.
- Introduced: 1898; 128 years ago
- Previous owners: Nabisco
- Website: www.snackworks.com/brands/nilla

Nabisco Vanilla Wafers box, prior to the 1967 name change

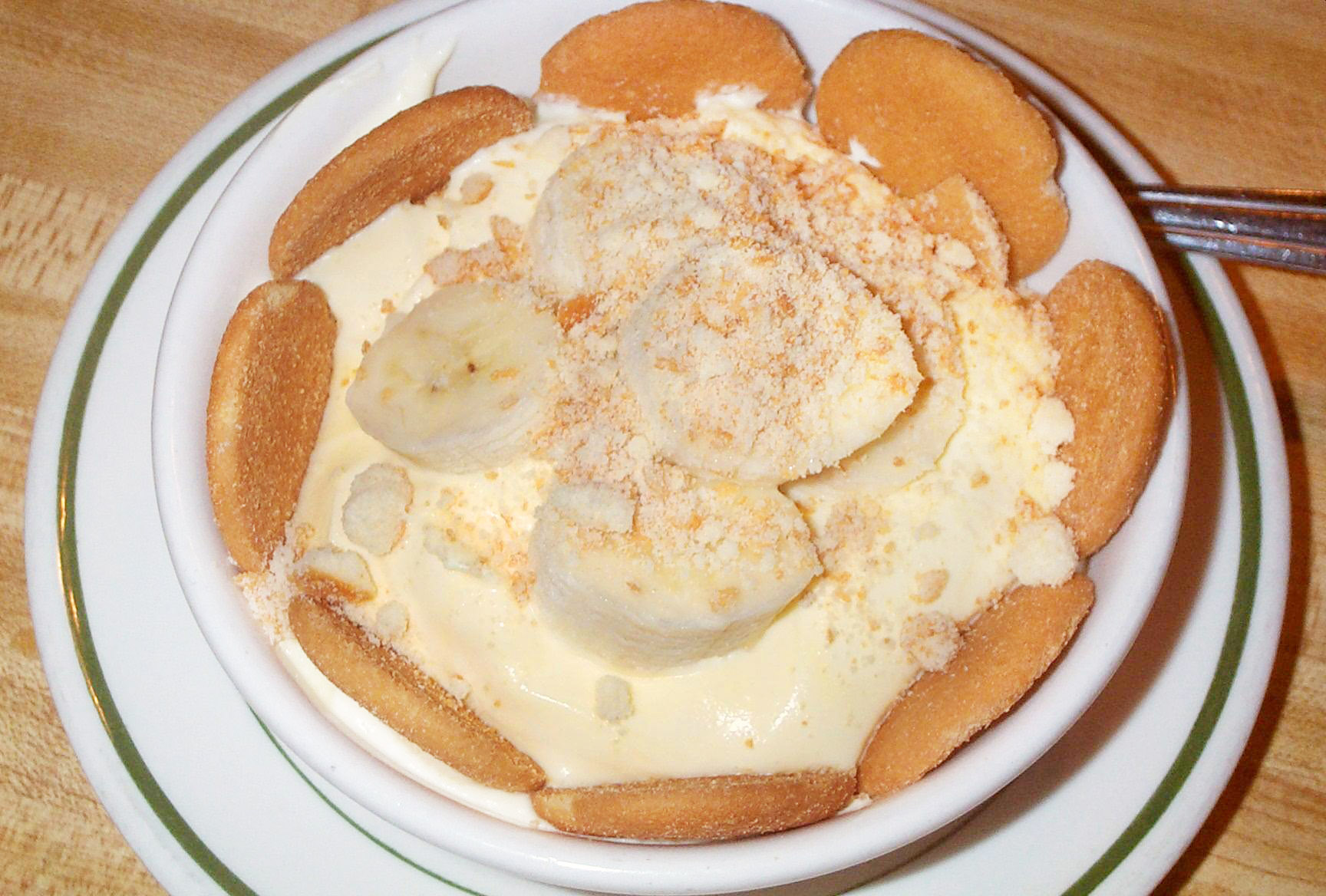
Banana pudding with Nilla wafers around the outside

Nilla Wafers are a wafer-style cookie made by Nabisco, a subsidiary of Illinois-based Mondelēz International.

The name is a shortened version of vanilla, the flavor profile common to all Nilla-branded products in previous years. Originally marketed as Nabisco Vanilla Wafers, the product's name was changed in 1967 to the abbreviated form, Nilla Wafer. Originally a round, thin, light wafer cookie made with flour, sugar, shortening, eggs and real vanilla, Nilla wafers have been primarily flavored with synthetic vanillin since at least 1994, a change which prompted criticism. Nilla wafers are described as having "natural and artificial flavor", according to the ingredients list on the box.

Nilla produced a variety of spin-off products, including pie crusts. The crusts were introduced in 1992 alongside pie crusts flavored like two other Nabisco cookie brands, Oreos and Honey Grahams.

== History ==
The recipe for vanilla wafers or sugar wafers was invented in the late 19th century by German-American confectioner Gustav A. Mayer on Staten Island. He sold his recipe to Nabisco, and Nabisco began to produce the biscuits under the name Vanilla Wafers in 1898. By the 1940s, Vanilla Wafers had become a major ingredient in the Southern cuisine staple banana pudding, and Nabisco began printing a banana pudding recipe on the Vanilla Wafers box. The name of the product was not changed to "Nilla Wafers" until 1967.

In 2013, the brand launched an advertising campaign on Facebook and other social media websites targeted at mothers, a campaign noted by the New York Times as unique because Mondelez International, the company that Kraft created to own the brand, spent its advertising dollars on social media rather than a combination of advertising platforms. The campaign resulted in a 9% increase in sales for Nilla. Nabisco had previously used other marketing techniques to promote the brand, including in-person events such as sponsoring banana pudding pie eating contests at amusement parks.

== Uses ==
Nilla wafers are a common ingredient in banana pudding and are consequently popular in the American South. In Atlanta and Houston, they are consistently in the five best-selling cookie brands.

The wafers themselves are commonly used to facilitate the oral administration of various compounds or medications to rats in testing. Nilla's branding has been used to study consumer preferences about variations in packaging.
