= Saigon Vietnam Deli =

Restaurant in Seattle, Washington, U.S.

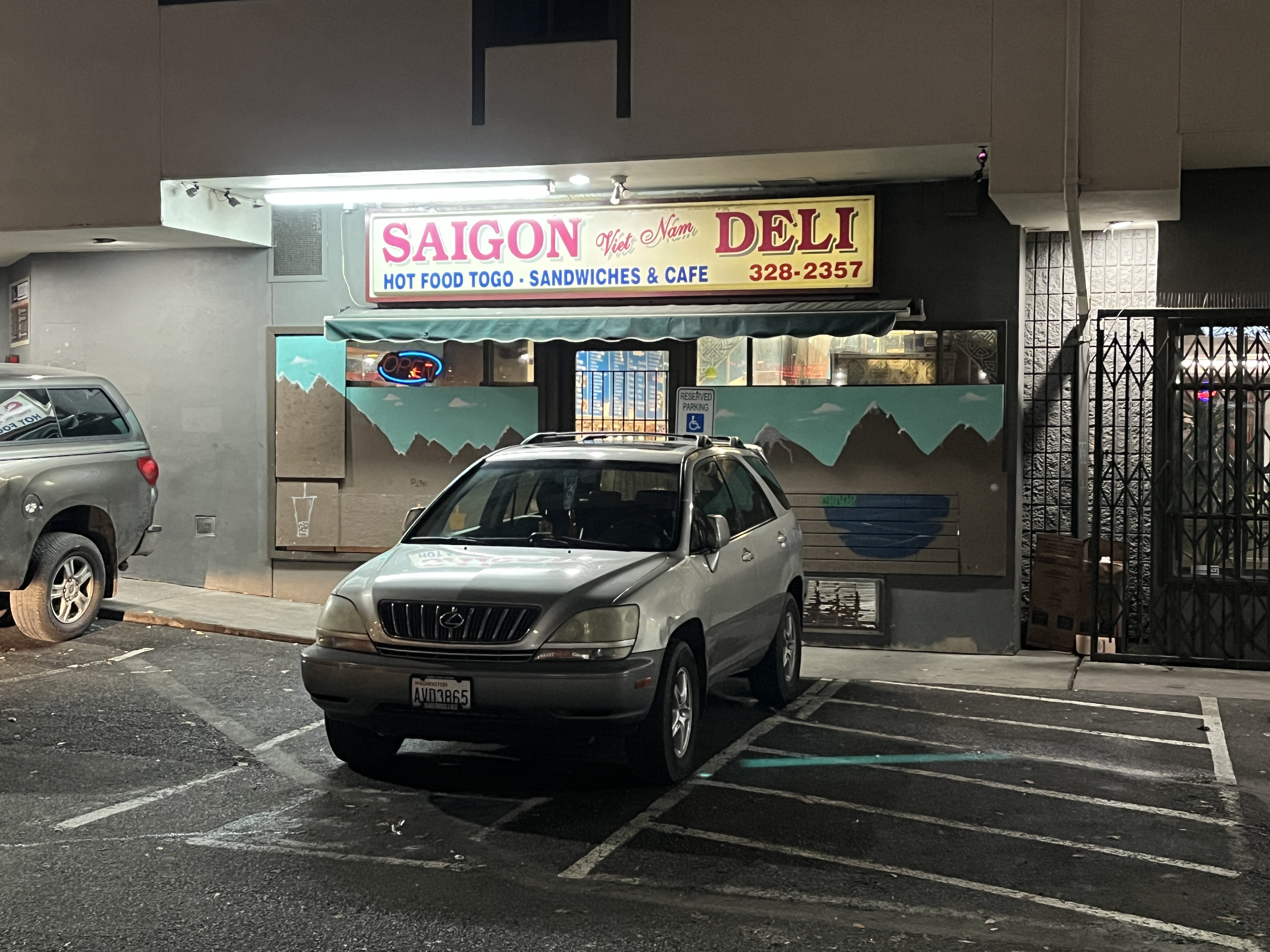
- The restaurant's exterior, 2022
- Interactive map of Saigon Vietnam Deli

Restaurant information
- Owners: Andy and Loan Kim Nguyen
- Food type: Vietnamese
- Location: 1200 S Jackson St #7, Seattle, King, Washington, 98144, United States
- Coordinates: 47°35′59.2″N 122°19′0.4″W

Saigon Vietnam Deli is a Vietnamese restaurant in Seattle's Chinatown–International District, in the U.S. state of Washington.

== Description ==
The menu has included 13 variations of bánh mì (including barbecue pork, chicken, fish, and tofu varieties), beef stew, stuffed bitter melon, coconut chicken, spring rolls, bánh cuốn (rice crepes), sesame balls, and colorful sweets.

== History ==
The restaurant is owned by Andy and Loan Kim Nguyen.

== Reception ==
The Not for Tourists Guide to Seattle says, "Some of the best banh mi you'll find. Cheap, fast, and so good." In 2019, Aimee Rizzo of The Infatuation wrote, "Most of the bánh mì spots in town are known for their barbecued pork. Saigon Vietnam Deli is no exception—but their roasted pork is even better, not to mention the pickled daikon is the tangiest in the neighborhood. They also have other options, like rice plates topped with various stews, but you want this roasted pork sandwich." She and Carlo Mantuano included the deli in 2022 lists of "The Best Restaurants in the International District" and "The Best Bánh Mì in Seattle". Saigon Vietnam Deli was also included in The Infatuation's 2025 list of the 25 best restaurants in the Chinatown–International District.

Jay Friedman included the business in Eater Seattle's 2022 lists of 18 "vibrant" Vietnamese restaurants in the city and 19 "amazing" restaurants in the Chinatown–International District. He also included Saigon Vietnam Deli in a 2022 overview of "where to get some great banh mi in the Seattle area". The website's Mark Van Streefkerk and Jade Yamazaki Stewart included the business in a 2022 overview of the "most underrated" restaurants in the metropolitan area and said, "Saigon Vietnam Deli has a longstanding reputation for quick, inexpensive eats... Though there's no seating area, this busy deli is the definition of a hidden gem."

== See also ==
- List of Vietnamese restaurants
- Vietnamese in Seattle
