= Banana custard =

Banana slices mixed with custard

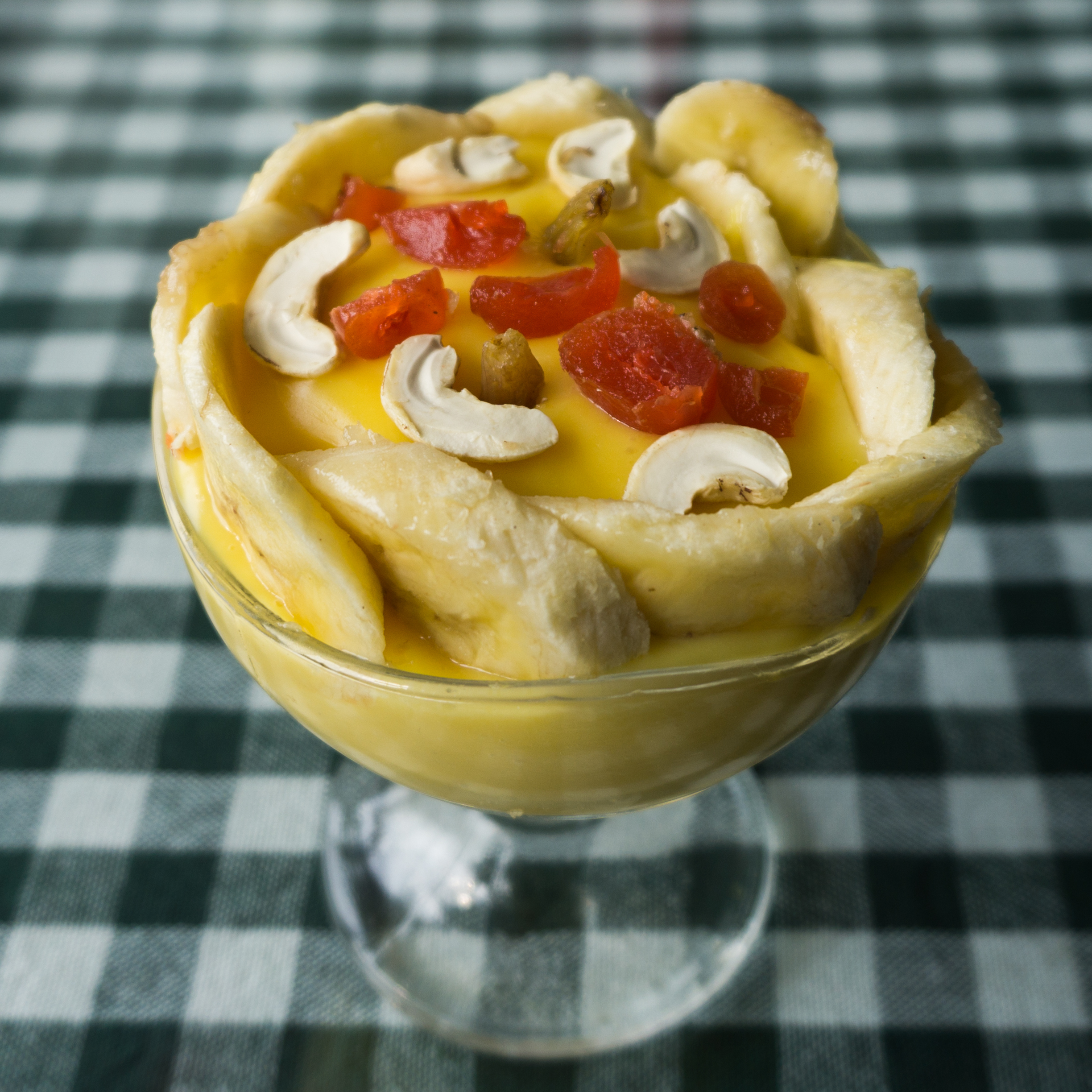
- Banana slices and cashews in custard
- Alternative names: Bananas in custard
- Type: Pudding
- Main ingredients: Banana slices, Custard

Banana custard or bananas and custard is a type of traditional pudding made from banana slices mixed with custard.

== Preparation ==
Bananas are peeled and then sliced horizontally into thin slices and added to a bowl of custard, the custard is then heated until it is piping hot. The hot custard and banana slices are then served. Some versions are served with chilled custard.

== See also ==
- Banana pudding
- List of custard desserts
