= Huong Binh Vietnamese Cuisine =

Restaurant in Seattle, Washington, U.S.

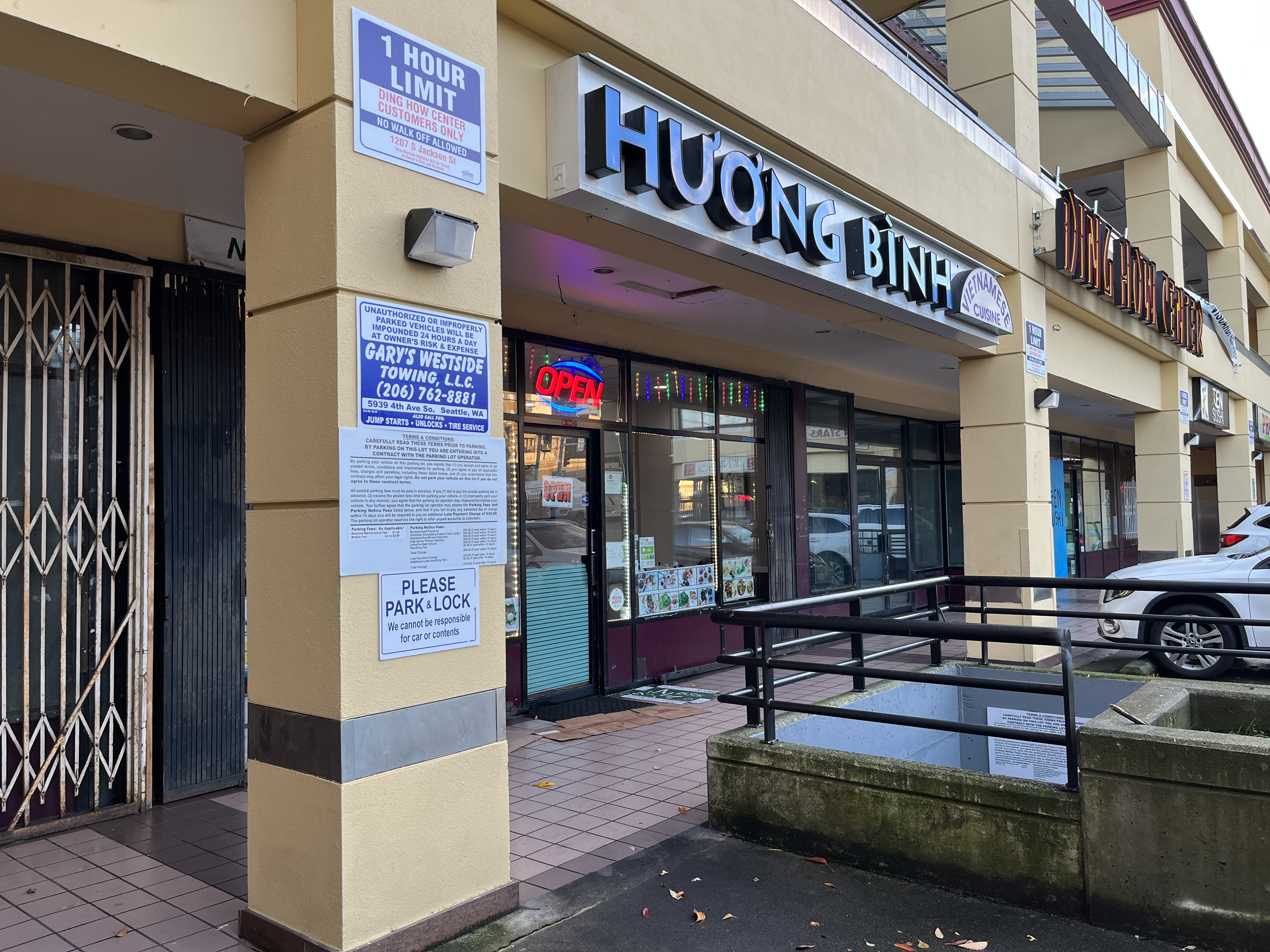
- The restaurant's exterior, 2023
- Interactive map of Huong Binh Vietnamese Cuisine

Restaurant information
- Food type: Vietnamese
- Location: 1207 South Jackson Street, Seattle, King, Washington, 98144, United States
- Coordinates: 47°35′56″N 122°18′59″W

Hương Bình Vietnamese Cuisine is a Vietnamese restaurant in Seattle's Chinatown–International District, in the U.S. state of Washington. Located at the intersection of 12th and Jackson in the Ding How Center strip mall in Little Saigon, the restaurant was established by Lien Dang in 1993. She sold the business in 2019.

== Description ==
The menu focuses on Vietnam's central region and has included duck noodle soup as well as congee served with blood sausage, pork tongue, liver, and ear. The restaurant has also served bánh bột lọc (dumplings), bún bò Huế (beef noodle soup), banh hoi thit nuong, bánh bèo, and jellied pancakes dusted with shrimp flakes and scallions, and other crepe-like dishes.

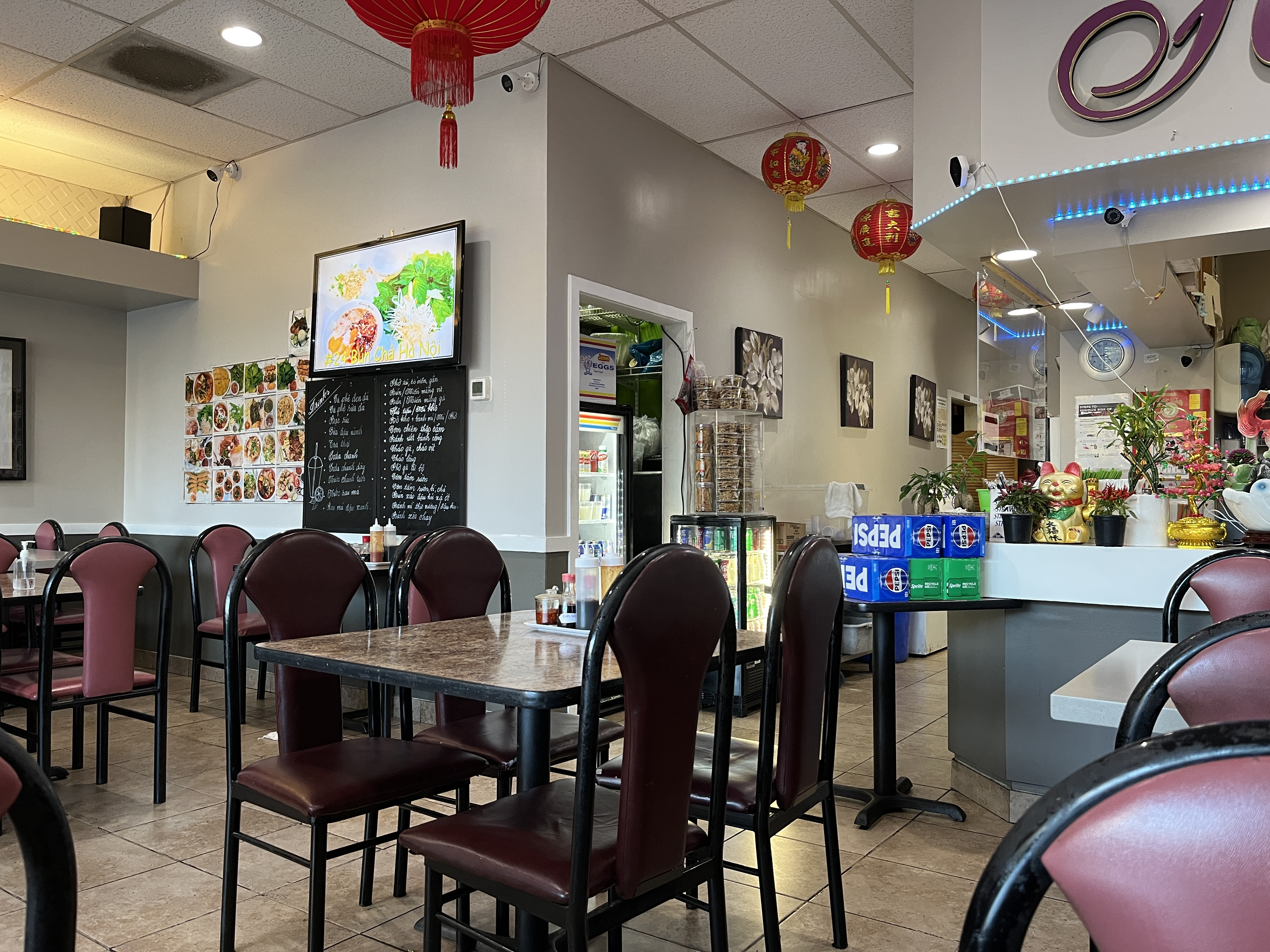
Interior

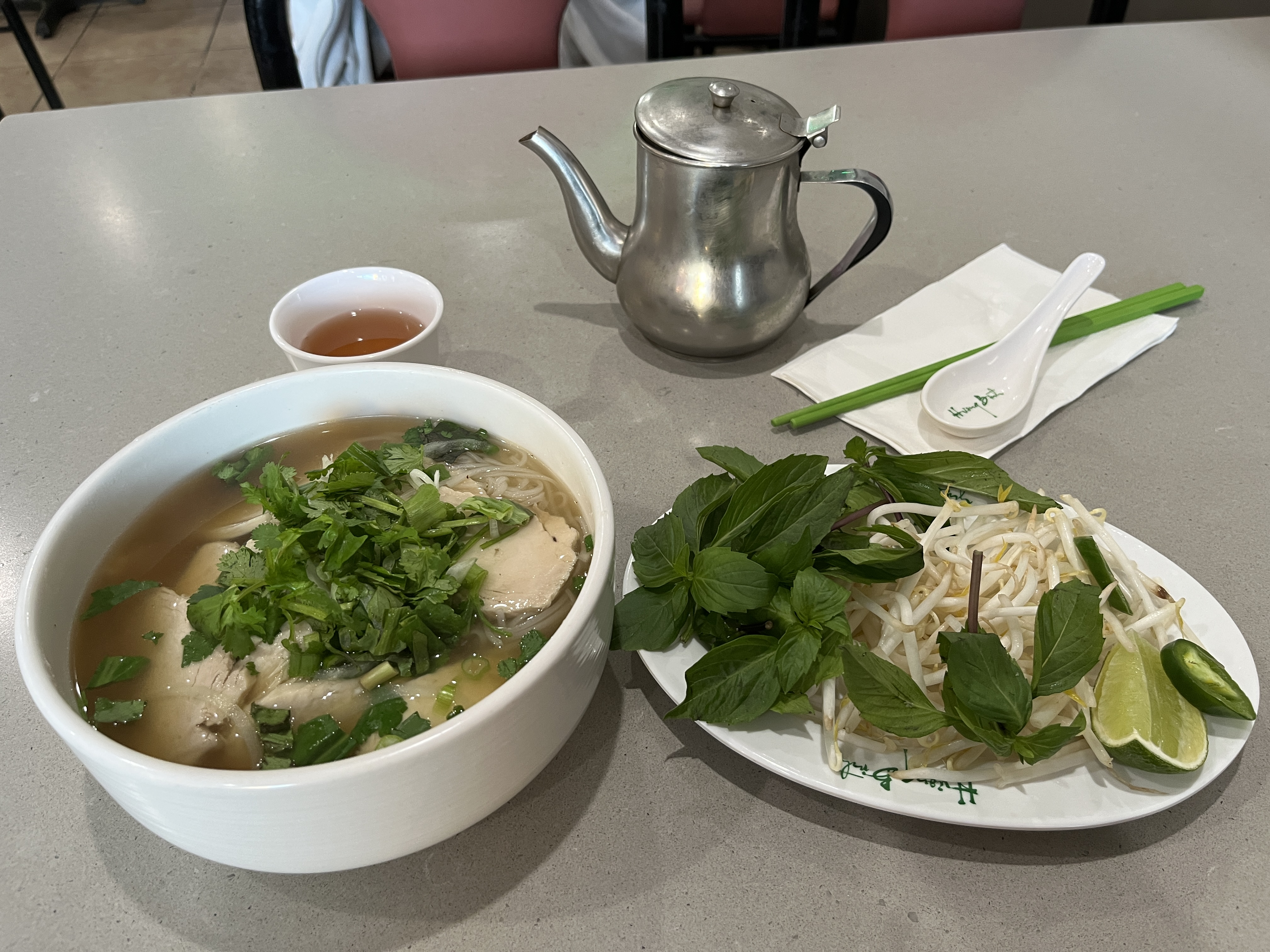
Chicken pho

== See also ==
- List of Vietnamese restaurants
- Vietnamese in Seattle
