= Ba Bar =

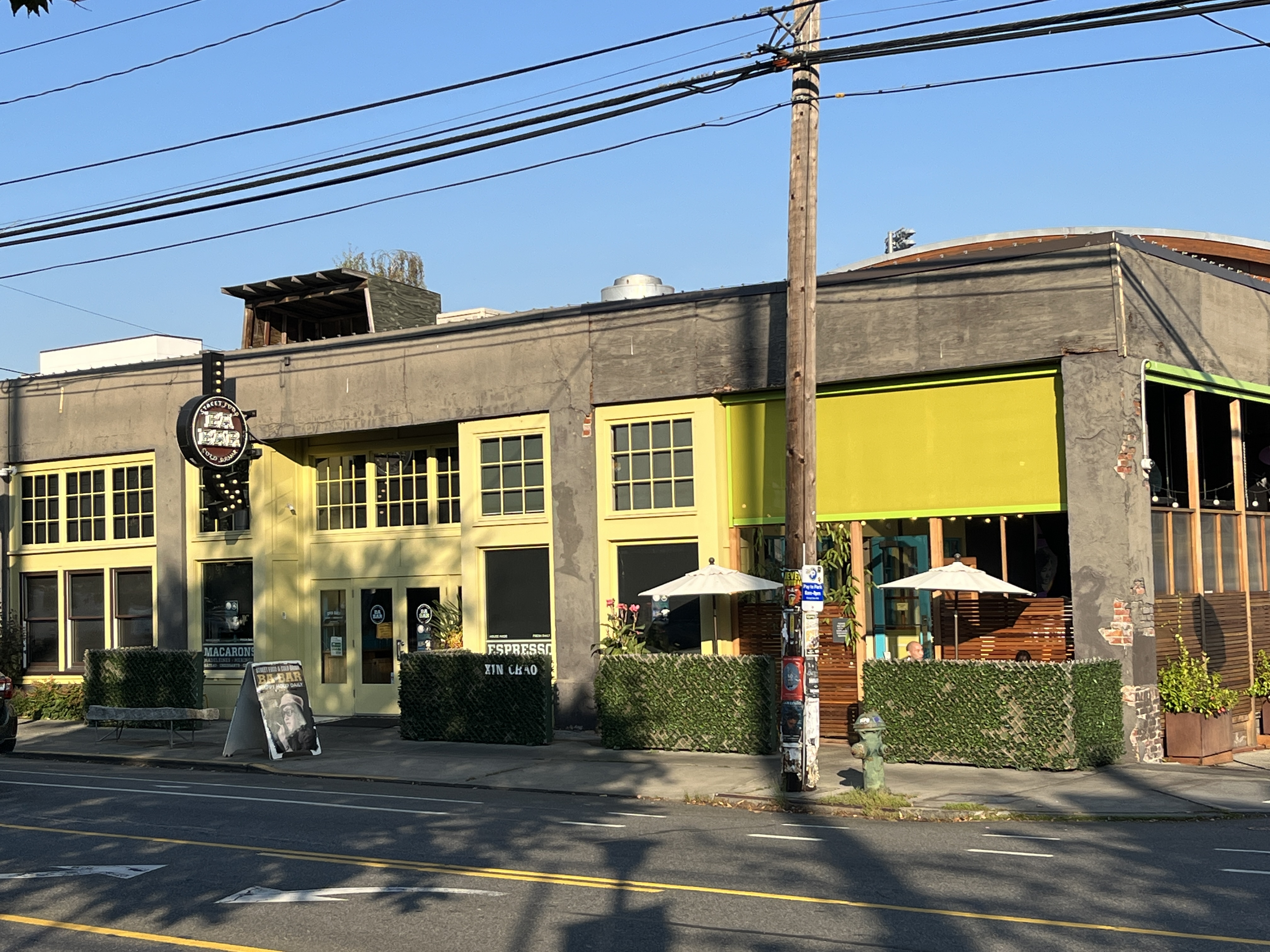
- Exterior of the restaurant near Capitol Hill, 2022

Restaurant information
- Food type: Vietnamese
- Location: Seattle, Washington, United States

Ba Bar is a small chain of Vietnamese restaurants in Seattle, in the U.S. state of Washington.

== Description and history ==
Ba Bar operates in three locations: on Capitol Hill, in South Lake Union, and in the University District. In 2022, the South Lake Union restaurant launched the walk-up window operation Ba Bar Green, serving vegan options. Ba Bar's menu has included pho, vermicelli noodle bowls, rotisserie meats such as chicken, duck, and pork belly, pastries such as macarons and pandan cake, and Vietnamese coffee.

== Reception ==
Maggy Lehmicke and Dylan Joffe included Ba Bar in Eater Seattle's 2022 list of "12 Essential Late-Night Restaurants in Seattle". Jay Friedman included the restaurant in a 2022 list of "18 Vibrant Vietnamese Restaurants in Seattle". Ba Bar was also included in Eater Seattle's 2022 overview of "Where to Get Soothing Bowls of Pho in the Seattle Area". Allecia Vermillion included Ba Bar Green in Seattle Metropolitan's 2022 list of "Seattle's Best Vegan and Plant-Based Restaurants".

== See also ==
- List of restaurant chains in the United States
- List of Vietnamese restaurants
- Vietnamese in Seattle
