= Vietnamese in Seattle =

The Vietnamese American community in the Seattle, Washington area is home to a large Vietnamese population of more than 55,000 residents, which is about 1.5% of the metropolitan area's population. Much of the Vietnamese community lives in the Chinatown-International District, South Seattle, and the University District. Many Vietnamese arrived post-Vietnam War during the 1970s. Several thousand arrived at Camp Murray in the 1970s.

A significant, prosperous Vietnamese American business district centered at 12th Avenue and Jackson Street, immediately east of the city's considerably older Chinatown district. This Vietnamese area has not been officially designated a "Little Saigon", although a few street signs with this name have been erected. Rather, the area – along with the Chinatown district – has retained the longstanding name International District (now officially Chinatown/International District, but often just "The I.D."), dating back to the late 1940s. The predominantly Chinese and predominantly Vietnamese areas are separated from one another by an Interstate 5 viaduct, but there is easy pedestrian and car access between the two.

There is a community center, Friends of Little Saigon, which serves the Vietnamese community of Greater Seattle. Vietnamese restaurants include Ba Bar, Hello Em, Monsoon, Huong Binh Vietnamese Cuisine, Phin, Phở Bắc, Phởcific Standard Time, Saigon Deli, Saigon Vietnam Deli, Stateside, and Tamarind Tree.
