= Phởcific Standard Time =

Bar and restaurant in Seattle, Washington, U.S.

Coordinates: 47°36′53.5″N 122°20′14.5″W

- Interactive map of Phởcific Standard Time

Restaurant information
- Food type: Vietnamese
- Location: Seattle, King, Washington, United States

Phởcific Standard Time (PST) is a speakeasy-style cocktail bar and restaurant in Seattle, in the U.S. state of Washington. The AAPI-owned business was founded by sisters Quynh and Yenvy Pham.

== Description ==
Phởcific Standard Time is a cocktail bar and restaurant in downtown Seattle. Drinks feature Vietnamese ingredients such as pandan leaf, Chartreuse egg yolk custard, and pho broth. The Nuoc Mat has jasmine, Fever Tree Mediterranean tonic, Cocchi Americano, soju, and longan. The Dua Dua has Batavia arrack, Chareau Aloe, soju, absinthe, coconut milk, lime, and basil seeds. The Trung Muoi is made with pho fat washed Iwai Japanese whisky, cream sherry, nocino, carcavelos, and salted egg yolk. The food menu includes pastries with pate, potato, and mushroom, as well as a pate trio with pho fat, mushroom tofu, and canned fish tomato pates served with sesame crackers and picklings. The Cua Dip, served with crackers, has crab, prawns, Vietnamese mayonnaise, melted cheese, and basil. Phở Bắc's "pho cups" (similar to Cup Noodles) are available in beef, chicken, prawn, and vegetable varieties.

== Reception ==
The bar was included in Bon Appétit's annual list of best new restaurants. Naomi Tomky included the bar in a similar list published by the Seattle Post-Intelligencer. She and Bradley Foster included PST in Thrillist's 2022 list of "The Absolute Best Bars in Seattle Right Now". Matthew Lombardi and Jade Yamazaki Stewart included the business in Eater Seattle's 2022 list of "14 Essential Seattle Bars".

== See also ==
- List of Vietnamese restaurants
- Vietnamese in Seattle
