= Banana bread =

Cake/Bread made from mashed bananas

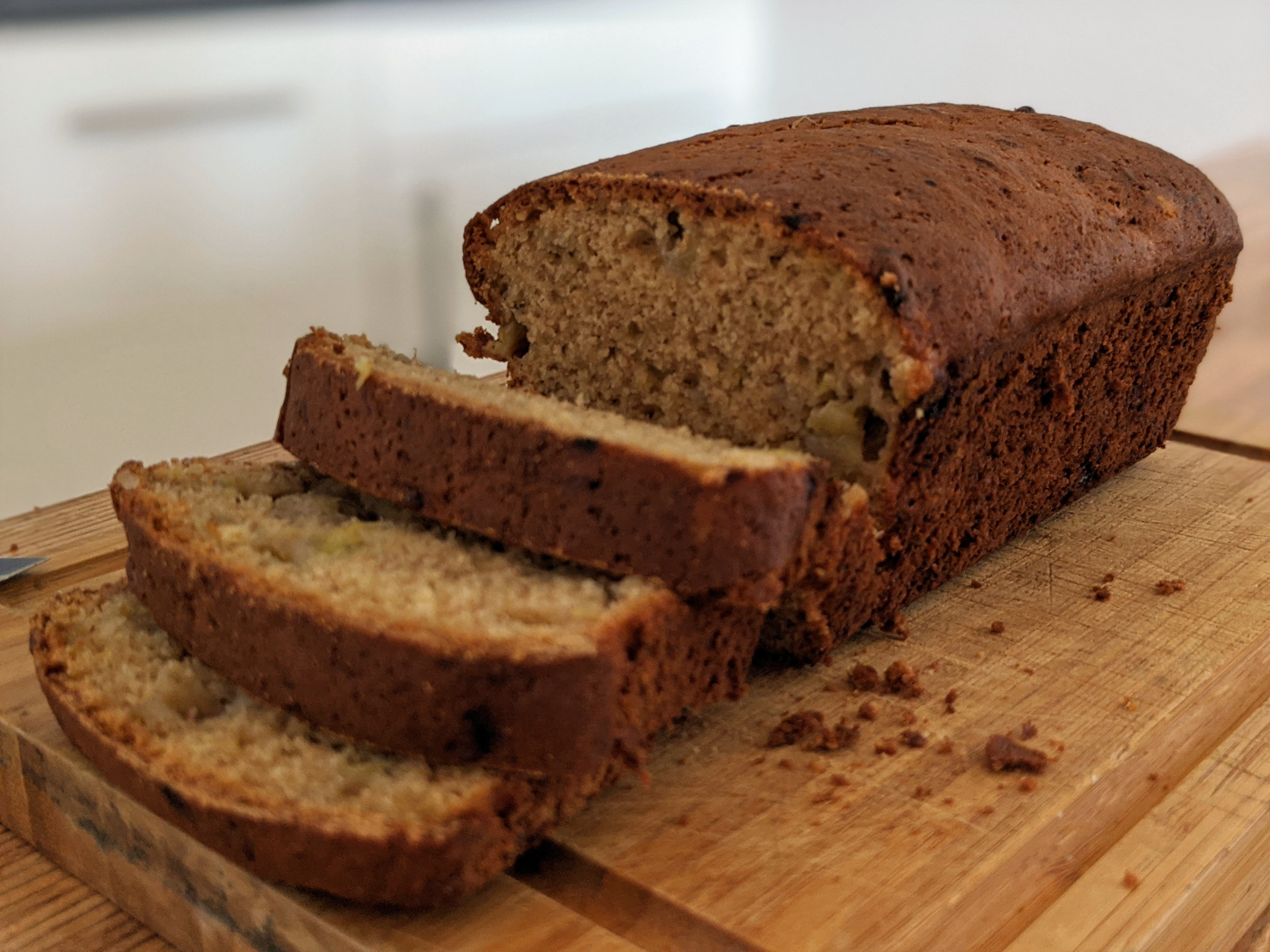
- A sliced loaf of banana bread
- Type: Sweet bread; cake
- Course: Dessert
- Place of origin: United States
- Invented: 1870s–1880s
- Main ingredients: Bananas; wheat; water; sugar

Banana bread or banana loaf is a type of sweet bread or cake made from bananas. Banana bread is typically classified as a quick bread in North America or a gâteau de voyage in France, relies on chemical leavening agents such as sodium bicarbonate or baking powder rather than yeast, to create the rise, though early recipes were yeasted. The bananas used in banana bread originally come from tropical Southeast Asia and are mashed to make a tender, soft treat. Its sweet taste and slightly crumbly texture make it more akin to a sponge cake or muffin than bread. The use of overripe bananas is common, as their increased sugar content and softer texture contribute to the bread’s characteristic sweetness and moist crumb.

== History ==
Banana plants were distributed around the Caribbean Islands after being transported to the New World, where production soared throughout the hemisphere. The fruit were considered a luxury good in the 18th and 19th centuries for the average consumer. Bananas became widely available to the US in the 1870s, with the New York Graphic reporting in 1874 that the banana was then an essential fruit in demand year-round, popular with both higher and lower social classes, but it took a while for them to appear as ingredients in desserts. The earliest known recipe for bananas in a dessert in the US was from the Good Housekeeping magazine in 1888, though a Banana pudding was mentioned in a New York Times column called Information Wanted in 1878. Commercial shipping of bananas to the United Kingdom started in the 1880s by Elders & Fyffes, with the earliest dessert recipes being possibly in Hilda Leyel and Olga Hartley's book The Gentle Art of Cookery from 1925.

Banana bread was originally a yeast based recipe with the earliest seen advertisements possibly in January 1881 from Lawrence, Kansas, and the Vienna Model Bakery in April 1893.

Bananas became more accessible in the early 20th century after being imported from Latin America to the American-owned United Fruit Company. Banana bread recipes emerged in cookbooks across North America when baking powder became available in grocery stores in the 1930s. Possibly the first printed recipe for a baking powder based bread was in the Pillsbury Balanced Recipes book of 1933. These recipes soon travelled across the Atlantic to the United Kingdom through magazines like Good Housekeeping, in which the American housewives' letters' section included the recipes. However, it did not take off in the UK until rationing ended after World War II. During the Great Depression, Americans were wary of throwing away overripe bananas due to the scarcity of food. Banana bread therefore became a substitute for sugar and a resourceful way of avoiding food waste. The recipe originally appeared in American cookbooks, and due to the widespread abundance of bananas at the time, many families adopted the classic banana bread recipe in their households, sometimes even adjusting it to their liking. Others believe that banana bread was developed in corporate kitchens to promote flour and baking powder products.

The bread evolved in America to reflect the current trends. For example, the 1948 edition of Joy of Cooking written by Irma S. Rombauer, provides a banana bread recipe with no eggs, milk, and spices such as cinnamon. Instead, the recipe relies on sour cream and buttermilk, which were less expensive and easier to find. During the 60s, the trends for healthier bakes resulted in recipes with wheat flour and brown sugar.

Banana bread experienced a surge in popularity during the COVID-19 pandemic lockdowns in 2020. At the time, panic buying increased and contributed to grocery shortages. Culturally, home baking was prioritized during the quarantine period during the COVID-19 pandemic. Despite this, banana imports into the United States remained relatively stable, with banana prices increasing by only approximately two cents. Home baking became a common recreational activity during lockdown, and banana bread emerged as a widely discussed baking trend. Its popularity was reflected in social media and new coverage, and was used as a way to repurpose overripe fruit.

February 23 is National Banana Bread Day in the United States and Australia.

== Around the world ==
Banana bread has become a popular dish around the world. Bananas are the world's most popular fruit and fourth biggest food staple after rice, wheat and corn.

=== Australia ===
A type of banana bread, made with banana flour, was reported in Queensland in the 1890s. A recipe for a baking powder raised banana bread appeared in 1933 in The Queenslander Illustrated Weekly, the same year as the Pillsbury recipe was printed. Major cities in Australia, namely Melbourne, also had massive booms of popularity following the COVID-19 pandemic.

=== Brazil ===
In Brazil it is sometimes made with Cachaça, and is often topped with caramelised banana slices.

=== France ===
The early recipes appeared in the 1960s, with chef Michel Oliver having a recipe for a Gâteau à la banane, but this was based on a French Quartre-Quarts recipe than a baking powder raised bake. The baking powder recipe, or known in French baking techniques as gateau de voyage, became a favourite during the 2000s after its introduction at the Rose Bakery in the Marais district of Paris, which was run by an Anglo-French couple.

=== Jamaica ===
Jamaican banana breads often include dark rum and allspice.

=== Japan ===
In Japan, banana breads normally incorporate matcha green tea powder, red bean paste, or black sesame seeds.

=== Philippines ===
In the Philippines, banana bread is usually called "banana cake." It was introduced during the American colonial period of the Philippines as the Philippines became a top banana supplier.

=== Scandinavia ===
The arrival of banana bread is new quite new to the Scandinavian baking repertoire. In the 2012 book Scandilicious Baking by Signe Johansen, it was described as "been welcomed with open arms and looks set to stay."

=== Taiwan ===
In the southern Taiwanese area, heaps amount of bananas was being produced after 1967, cultivated in an area of over 50,000 hectares, with exports exceeding 400,000 tons per year. Taiwanese bananas were sold for more money at the port because they are sweeter and have a stickier, denser texture than bananas in other countries. Taiwan experienced a decline in total production of bananas amounting to 295,000 metric tons by 2019. Due to this drop in production, researchers have investigated the manufacturing technology behind banana-assorted breads, testing how different banana cultivars influence dough fermentation and bread production, such as banana bread.

=== Thailand ===
In Thailand, banana bread incorporate coconut milk and tropical fruits like mango or pineapple.

== Production and preparation ==
Bread and banana bread can be produced using different preparation methods. It is traditionally prepared by baking dough made from flour and water. Wheat flour is commonly used. Traditional bread products generally involved yeast fermentation, which allows dough to rise before baking. However, modern North American banana bread is generally classified as quick bread, using chemical leaving agents such as baking soda or baking powder rather than yeast.

Bananas are highly perishable and susceptible to deterioration and spoilage after harvesting, which facilitates their overripe state commonly valued for banana bread preparation. Increasing the proportion of banana in banana bread tends to affect several properties of the bread, including moisture and fat content, while protein content decreases.

== Recipe distinctions ==
Many cookbooks have different takes on how banana bread should be made. Former Michelin star chef Marcus Wareing states that the bananas should be overripe, while America's Test Kitchen says it should be made with pure yellow fruit. To prepare the bananas, food critic Charles Campion recommends that they should be pureed in a food processor, while the likes of Nigella Lawson, Marcus Wareing, the Hummingbird Bakery and pastry chef Claire Clark says you should mash them to a pulp. However, America’s Test Kitchen recommends they are coarsely smashed, stating that you "don’t purée – the banana needs to be chunky." Another disagreement is the use of raising agent. British recipes tend to use baking powder, while America’s Test Kitchen and Martha Stewart use only baking soda. Nigella Lawson recommends a combination of the two, while Charles Campion recommends using self-raising flour.

=== Gluten-free varieties ===
While banana bread is traditionally made with wheat flour, it can be made with gluten-free alternatives, such as oat flour, without undesirable effects on factors of bread structure like tenderness, volume, or moisture retention.

== Variations ==
- Banana raisin bread
- Banana nut bread (often featuring chopped nuts, such as walnuts, pecans or almonds)
- Chocolate chip banana bread
- Banana bread muffins
- Banana crumble bread
- Vegan banana bread (made without eggs or dairy products)
- Blueberry banana bread (or other fruits such as raspberry or orange to add additional flavours)
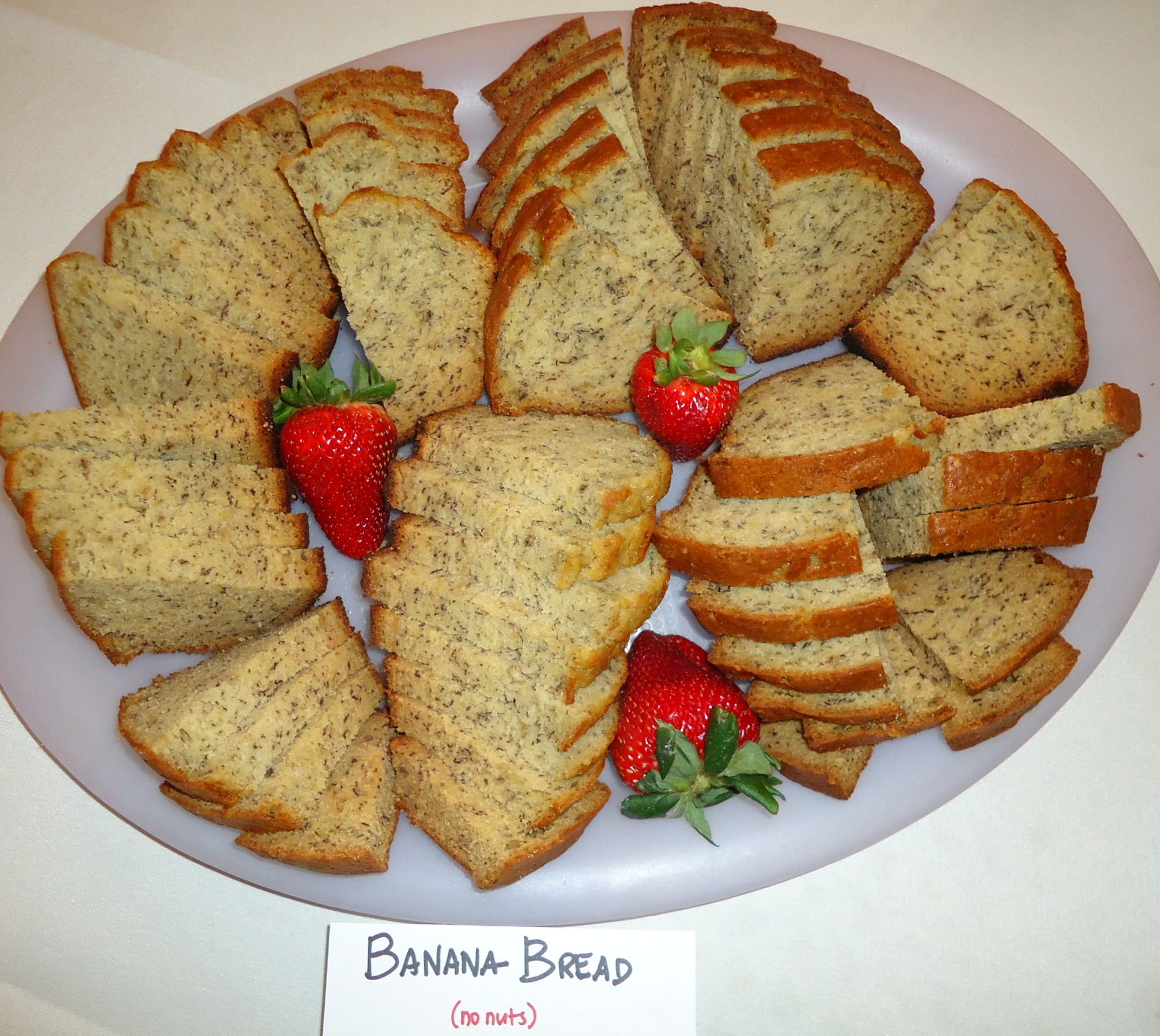
Banana bread

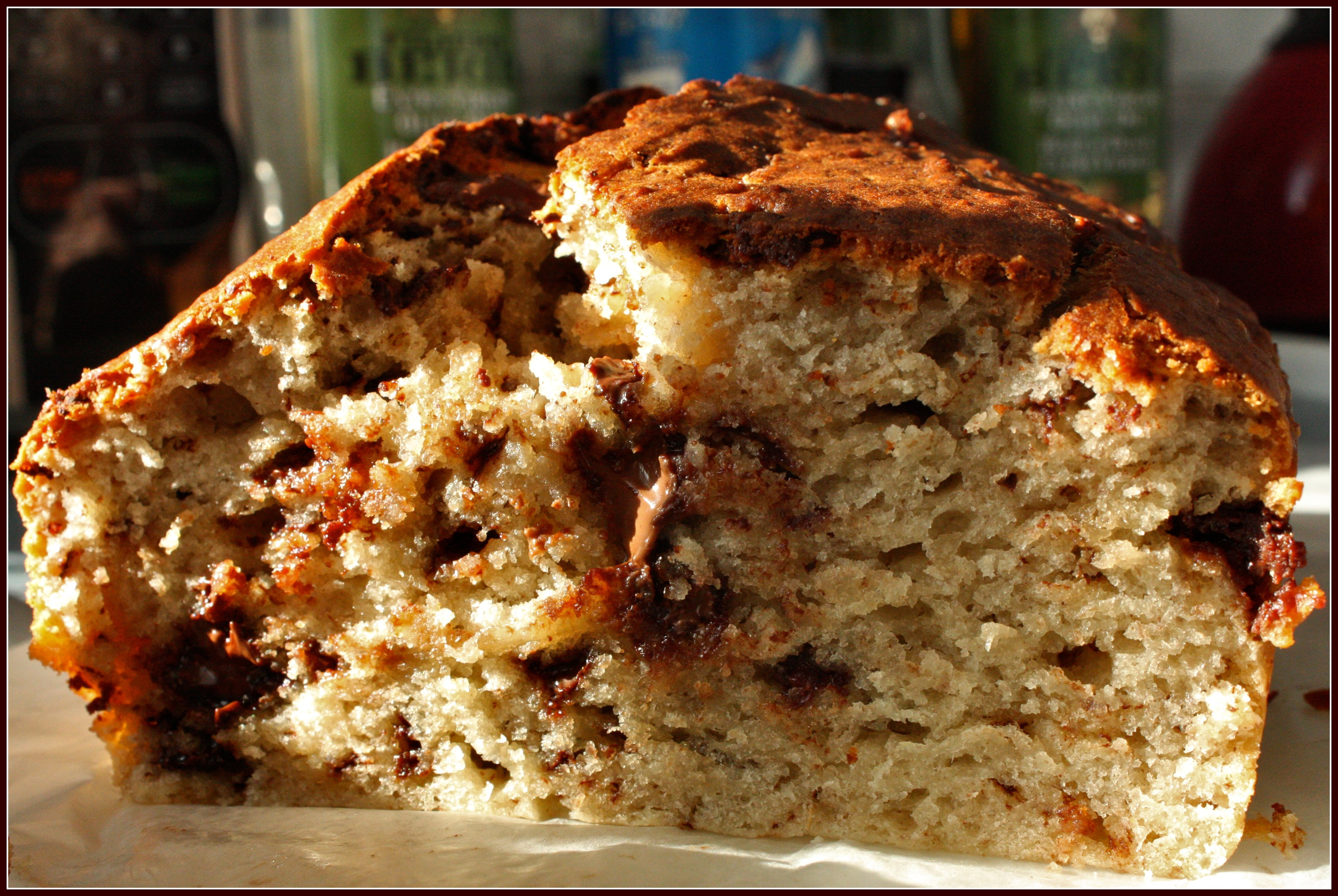
Chocolate chip banana bread

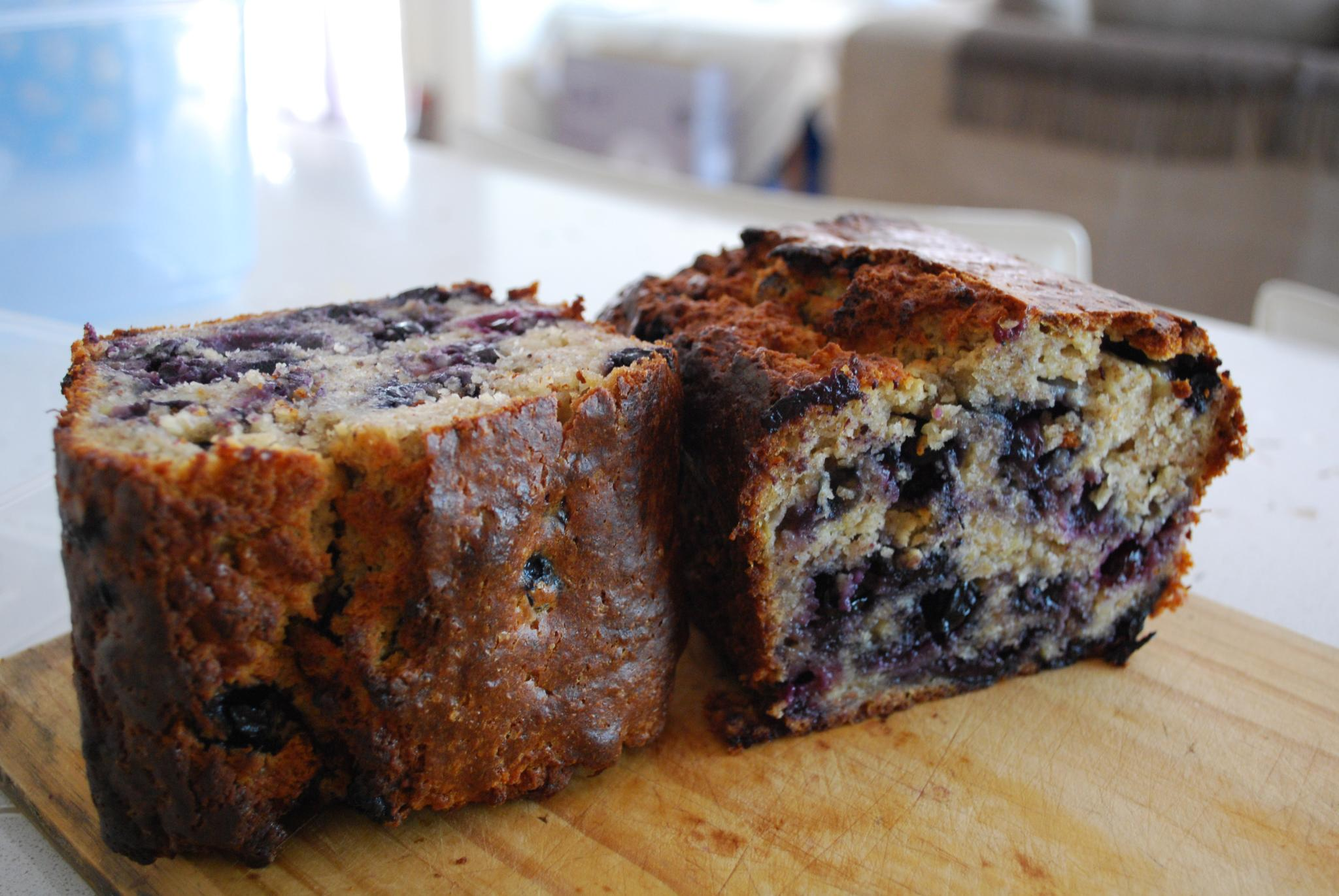
Blueberry banana bread

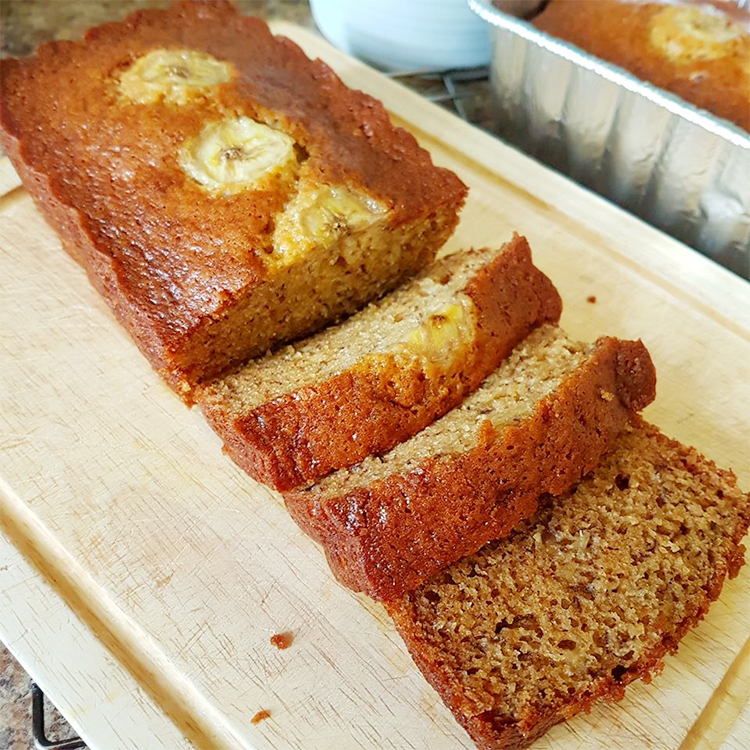
Filipino banana bread (often called "banana cake")

== See also ==
- Banana cake
- Bánh chuối, a banana cake from Vietnam
- List of American breads
- List of banana dishes
- List of quick breads
- List of sweet breads
- Pumpkin bread
- Zucchini bread
- Carrot bread
