= Bánh chuối =

Sweet banana pancake

- A slice of bánh chuối nướng
- Type: Rice cake or bread pudding
- Course: Dessert, snack
- Place of origin: Vietnam
- Region or state: Southeast Asia
- Main ingredients: Bananas or plantains, coconut milk, sugar, white bread, shredded young coconut, condensed milk, butter, egg, vanilla extract

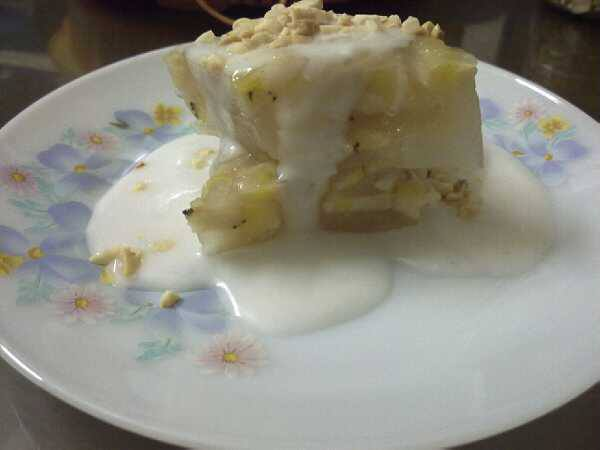
Bánh chuối steamed with coconut milk

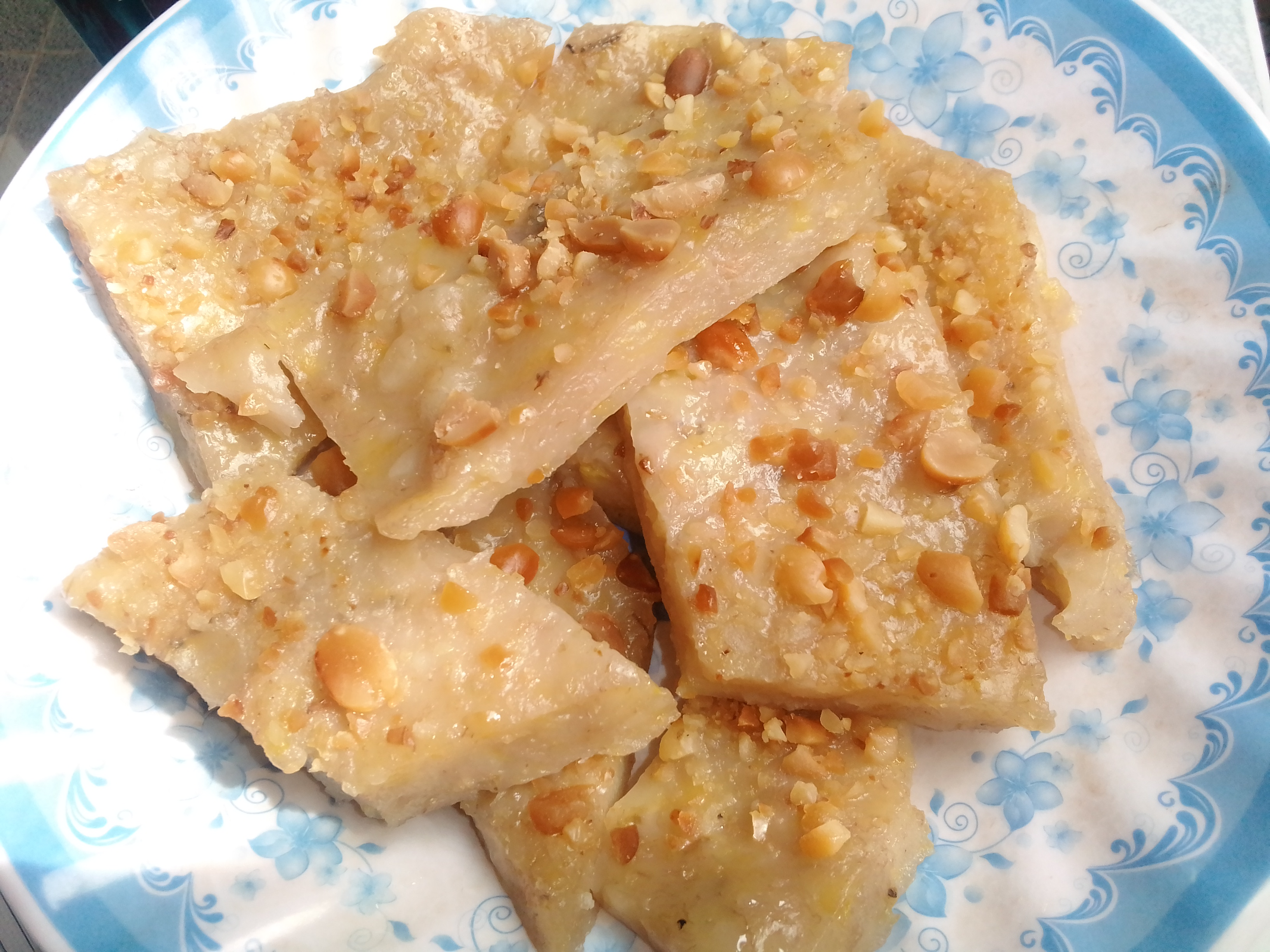
Steamed bánh chuối served with peanuts

Bánh chuối (literally "banana cake") is a sweet banana cake or bread pudding from Vietnam. Although its exact ingredients may vary, it is usually made with ripe bananas or plantains, rice flour, coconut milk, sugar, white bread, shredded young coconut, condensed milk, butter, egg, and vanilla extract. In the finished dish, the cooked banana often appears purplish-red in color.

There are two main varieties of bánh chuối:

- Bánh chuối nướng (literally "baked banana cake") - This variety of bánh chuối is cooked by baking it in a pan in an oven, giving it a golden-brown, crisp exterior.
- Bánh chuối hấp (literally "steamed banana cake") is similar in appearance to the baked version, but some rice starch is added and it is steamed rather than baked, and the outside is not golden-colored.

Additionally, other variations include:

- Bánh chuối chiên, which is often sold as a flattened banana and sticky rice fritter.
- Bánh chuối khoai, which includes slices of sweet potato.

== See also ==
- List of banana dishes
- List of steamed foods
