= Banana cake =

Cake made from banana

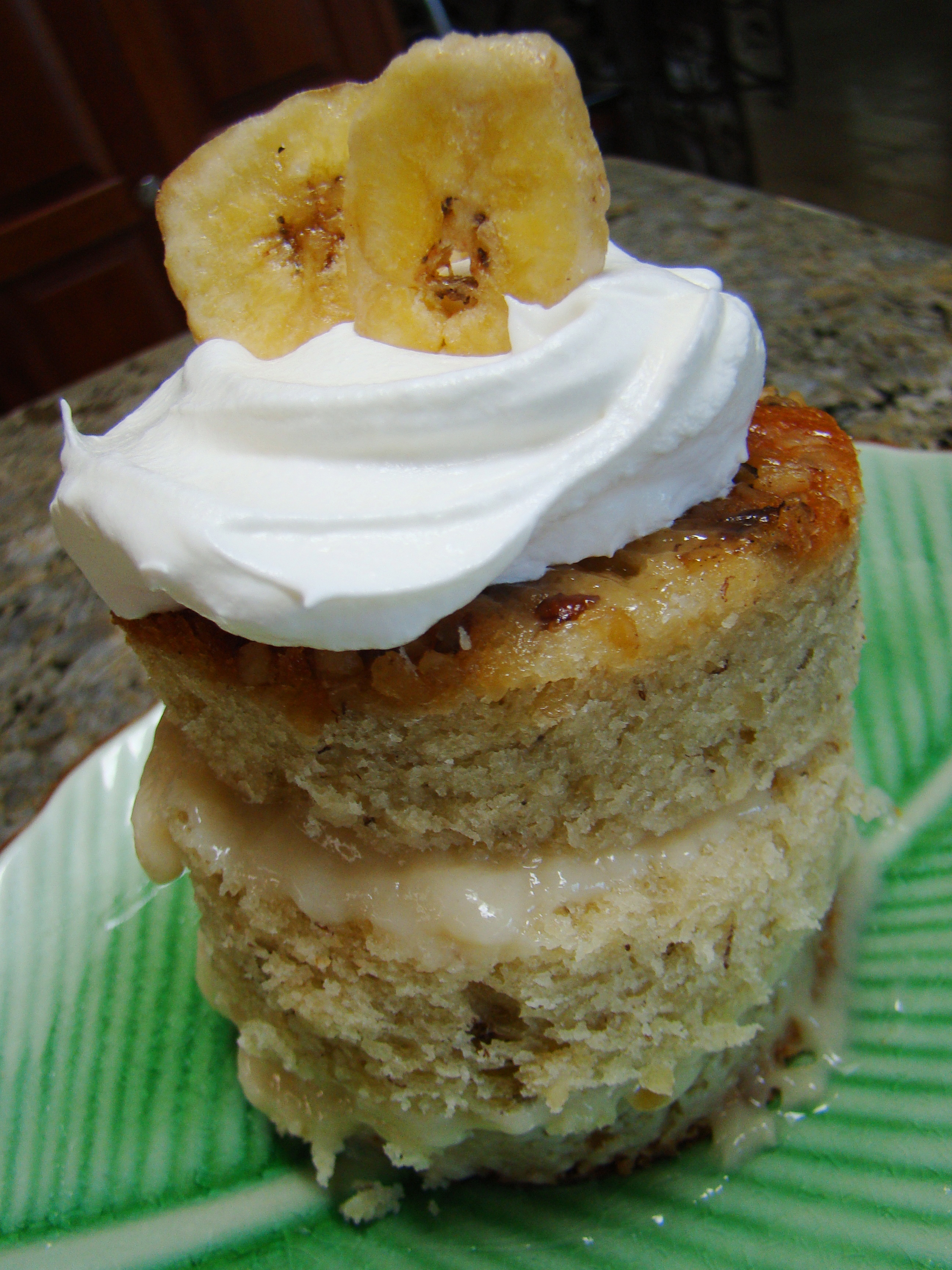
A banana cupcake

A banana cake is a cake prepared using banana as a primary ingredient and typical cake ingredients. It can be prepared in various manners, including as a layer cake, as muffins and as cupcakes. Steamed banana cake is found in Malaysian, Indonesian and Vietnamese cuisine. In the Philippines, the term "Banana Cake" refers to banana bread introduced during the American colonial period of the Philippines.

== Preparation ==
Banana cake is prepared using banana as a primary ingredient and typical cake ingredients, such as flour, sugar, eggs, butter, margarine or oil and baking soda. The bananas can be mashed or puréed using a food processor or electric mixer and mixed into the cake batter, and the cake can also be topped or garnished with sliced bananas. Banana cake may be prepared as a use for browned or overly-ripe bananas. Chocolate may be used as an ingredient, which along with the banana is an enjoyable flavor combination for some people. Nuts such as walnuts and macadamias may be used in the batter and to top and garnish the cake.

An icing or glaze may be used in the cake's preparation, which can include alcohol, such as bourbon. Banana cake can be baked or prepared as a steamed cake, for which a food steamer may be used. Banana cake may have a moist texture. It can be prepared as a layer cake, and the cake batter can be used to prepare banana muffins and cupcakes. It can be prepared as a vegetarian dish and as a low-fat dish.

Banana cakes

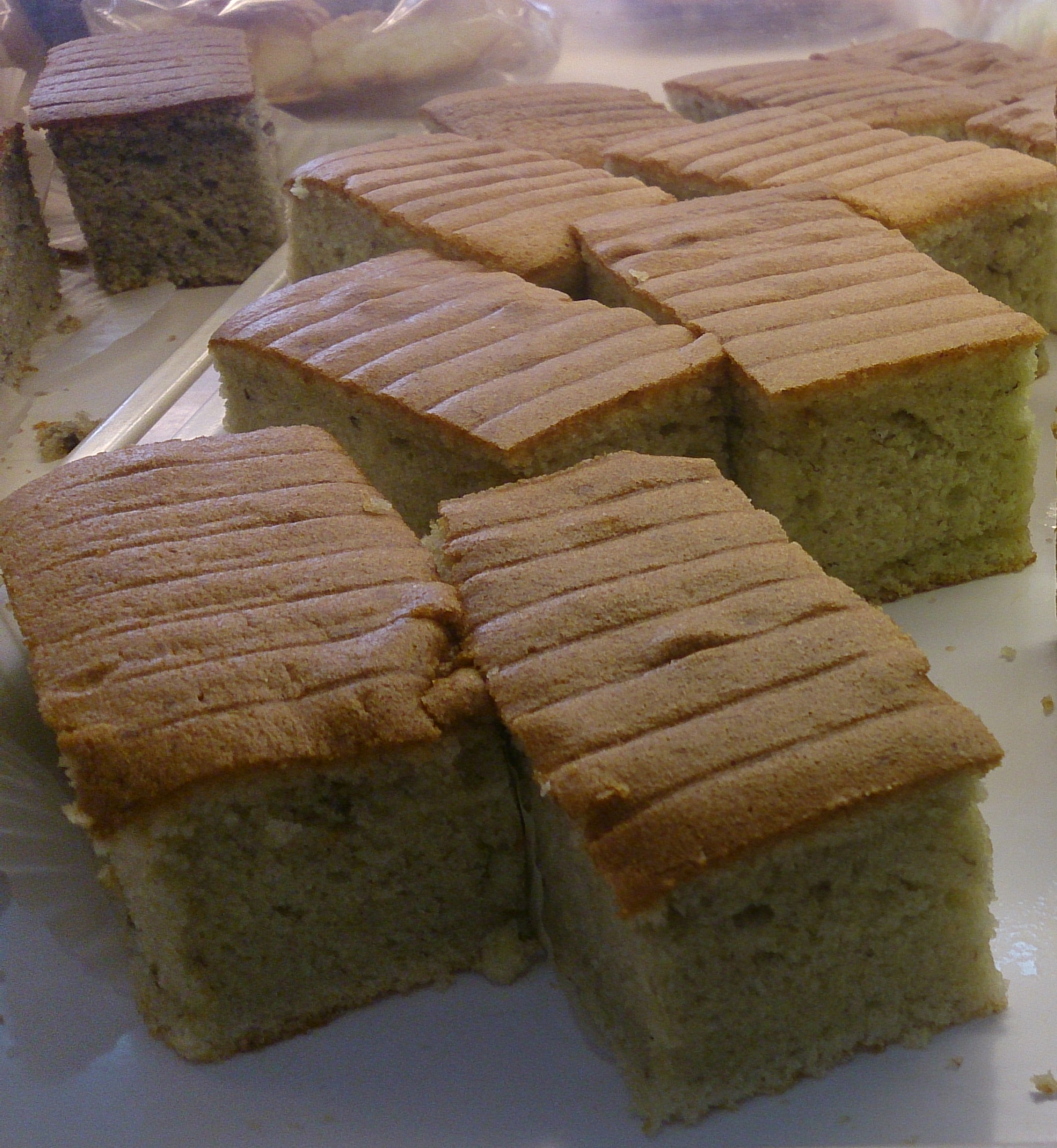
Slices of banana cake

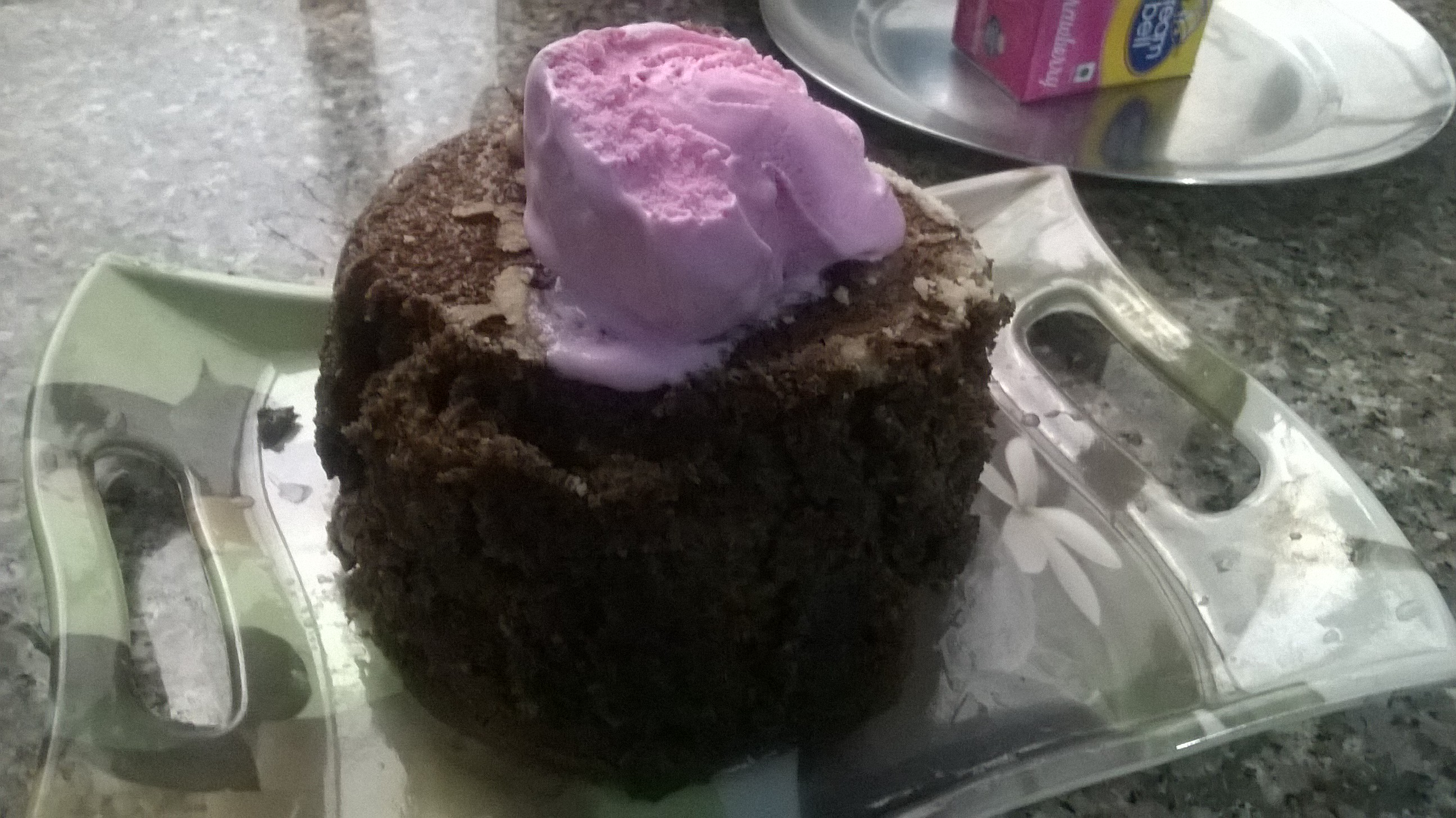
A chocolate banana cake garnished with strawberry ice cream

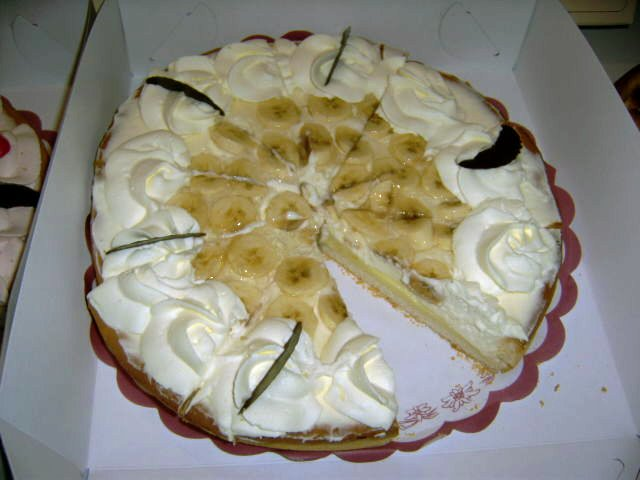
A banana cake garnished with sliced banana

== Types ==
In Burmese (Myanmar) cuisine

In Burmese cuisine, banana cake is a popular dessert. It is frequently served at weddings, birthday parties, and feasts. It is also eaten during the Ramadan festival of Eid.

=== Bánh chuối ===
Bánh chuối prepared in the style of a pancake

Bánh chuối is a Vietnamese banana cake or bread pudding. The cake is typically steamed, and the bread pudding may be baked.

=== Kue nagasari ===
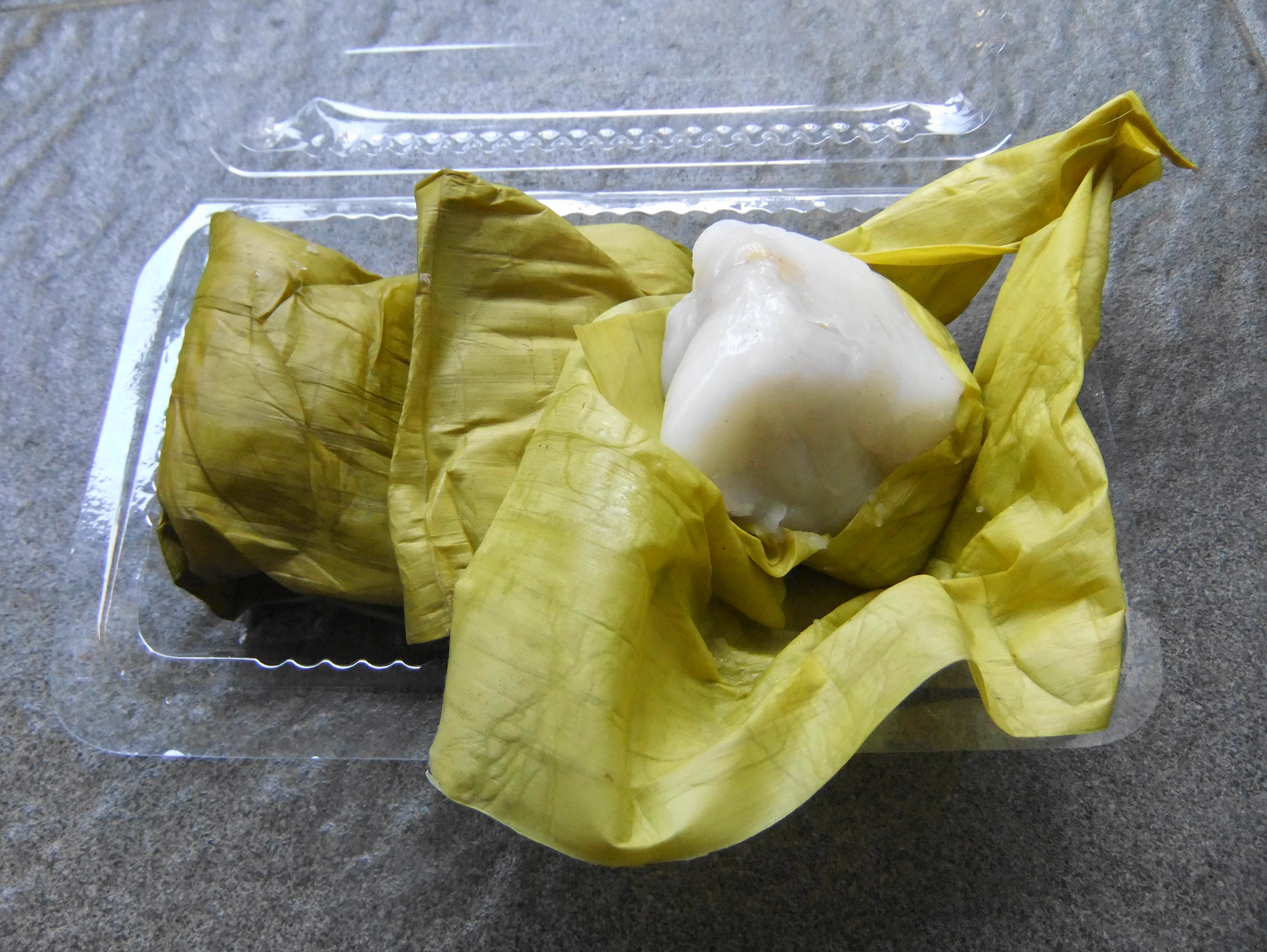
Unwrapped kue nagasari

Kue nagasari is a popular Indonesian steamed banana cake that can be prepared using banana, mung bean flour or rice flour, coconut milk and sugar.

== See also ==
- List of cakes
- List of banana dishes
