= An Xuyên (disambiguation) =

An Xuyên may refer to:

- An Xuyên, Cà Mau, a ward of Cà Mau province
- An Xuyên Bakery, a bakery in Portland, Oregon, United States
- An Xuyên province, a former province of South Vietnam
