= Ha's Đặc Biệt =

Vietnamese restaurant

Coordinates: 40.7170°N 73.9933°W

Ha's Đặc Biệt is a Vietnamese restaurant founded by Anthony Ha and Sadie Mae Burns in 2019. It has been featured in The New York Times, The New Yorker, Grub Street, and other publications. Originally a pop-up that moved from several locations in New York City and beyond, the restaurant is set to open a brick and mortar restaurant on Broome Street near the end of 2024.

== History ==
The restaurant began as a pop-up founded by Ha and Burns in 2019. Ha, an American of Vietnamese descent, grew up in California and New Jersey and went to college for graphic design. Burns grew up New York and completed her culinary education in Ireland after high school, later moving to Brooklyn for work. The two met as line cooks at Mission Chinese Food in 2015 and later married in September 2024. Prior to Ha's Đặc Biệt, the two ran a food cart called Mr. Fish Sauce.

Ha's Đặc Biệt's pop-up business model proved a success through the COVID-19 pandemic. Constantly changing and on a whim, the restaurant would announce their new locations on Instagram right before opening with a new menu, making it impossible to reserve ahead of time. To inform their menus, Ha and Burns would take food trips between pop-ups in various places like Montreal, Paris, Barcelona, and others. Eater called their pop-up business model "akin to what you might find at a street kitchen in Vietnam." In 2024, The New York Times said Ha's Đặc Biệt "would be at or near the top" of "a ranking of pop-ups".

Past pop-up locations include Dimes, Ops, and Yellow Rose, with residencies in Mắm on Forsyth Street and Gem Wine on Broome Street, as well as pop-ups in other countries. In London, they opened at Oranj in Shoreditch, and in Paris, they opened at Early June and Paul Bert. In 2022, the restaurant partnered with Kreung Cambodia at Outerspace in the Bushwick neighborhood. In 2023, the restaurant hosted a pop-up with wine bar Voodoo Vin in Los Angeles, their first appearance on the West Coast.

In July 2024, the restaurant announced on Instagram that they would be opening up a brick and mortar location on the Lower East Side on Broome Street in Gem Wine's old location.
