= Pho 75 =

Chain of Vietnamese restaurants

- Interactive map of Pho 75

Restaurant information
- Established: 1985
- Owners: Le Thiep; Binh Ngo
- Food type: Vietnamese
- Dress code: Casual
- Location: 1721 Wilson Blvd, Arlington County, Virginia, 22209, United States
- Coordinates: 38°53′39.5″N 77°04′44.2″W
- Other locations: 9

Pho 75 is the chain of restaurants that serve pho (Vietnamese beef noodle soup) in the Washington, D.C., and Philadelphia, Pennsylvania areas. In addition to soup, it also serves special desserts and Vietnamese coffee as well. It has branches in Arlington, Virginia, Falls Church, Virginia, Herndon, Virginia, Langley Park, Maryland, Hyattsville, Maryland, Rockville, Maryland and Philadelphia.

The original location was in the Colonial Village Shopping Center, until 1999 when they and the other shops were evicted. Pho 75 then moved into a larger space in the same center. It was the first Pho only restaurant in the DMV.

Pho 75 was founded by Le Thiep, a former journalist for Chinh Luan, a Saigon newspaper, and Binh Ngo, a university student, who both fled from Vietnam. A sign in the window of the original Pho 75 location in 1986 displayed: "America has hamburger. Italy has spaghetti. China has chow mein. We, the Vietnamese, proudly present pho...".

It is named after the year Saigon fell to North Vietnam, 1975.

== See also ==
- List of Vietnamese restaurants
