= Fish Sauce (restaurant) =

Vietnamese restaurant in Portland, Oregon, U.S.

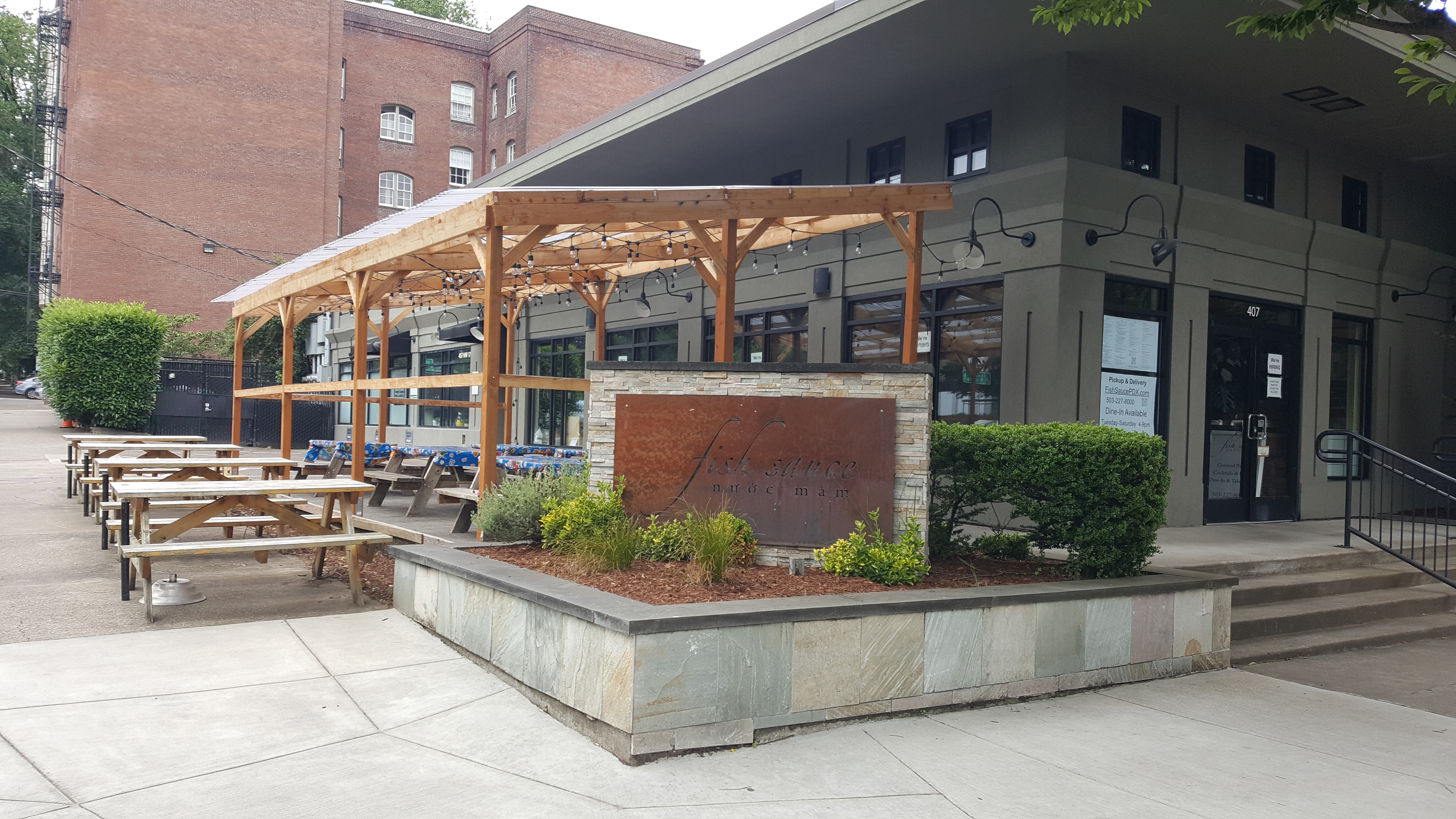
- The restaurant's exterior, 2022
- Interactive map of Fish Sauce

Restaurant information
- Established: August 2012
- Owner: Ben Bui
- Food type: Vietnamese
- Location: 407 Northwest 17th Avenue, Portland, Multnomah, Oregon, 97209, United States
- Coordinates: 45.5258°N 122.6885°W
- Seating capacity: 45
- Website: fishsaucepdx.com

Fish Sauce is a Vietnamese restaurant in Portland, Oregon, United States.

== Description ==
Named after the condiment of the same name, Fish Sauce is a Vietnamese restaurant at the intersection of 17th and Flanders in northwest Portland's Northwest District. The space seats approximately 45 people, and the interior features lights in Mason jars hanging from the ceiling. The menu includes bánh mì, fish sauce wings, Hainese chicken, grilled Korean short ribs, Bo Bia (fried rolls of jicama, basil, egg, and Chinese sausage in peanut sauce), pho, and vermicelli-stuffed rice paper rolls. Drinks include the Elephant Parade (Pueblo Viejo tequila, Lustau East India sherry, strawberry vinegar), the Renegade (Teachers Whiskey, tamarind, ginger syrup), the Two Birds (Sobieski vodka, orange liqueur, lemon), and the Wicked Games (pear brandy, pineapple, honey).

== History ==
Owner Ben Bui opened the restaurant in August 2012. A fire forced Fish Sauce to close for a month in 2017.

Fish Sauce's drink menu was designed by Tommy Klus, and KJ DeBoer was the bar manager, as of 2016–2017.

== Reception ==
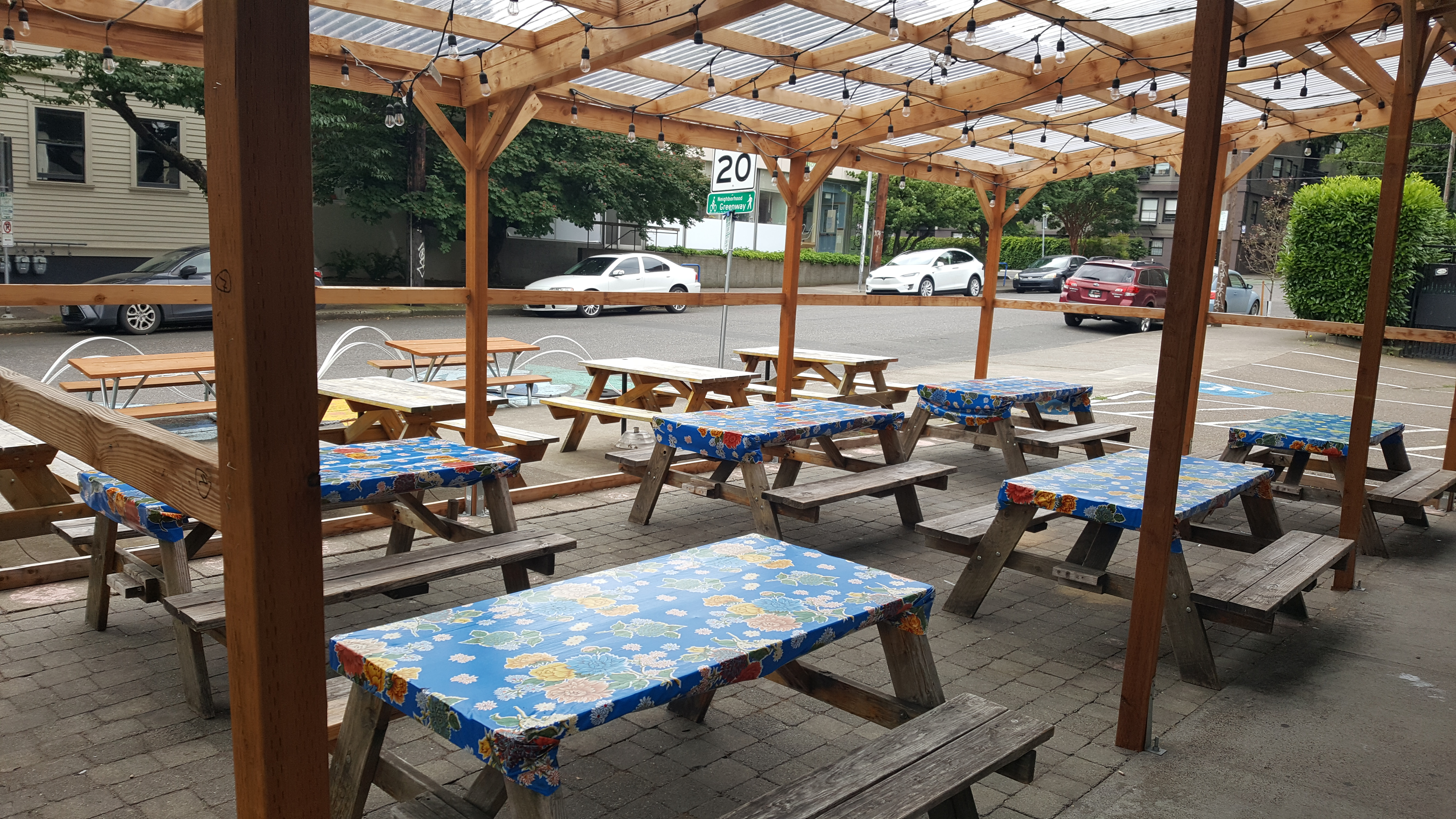
Outdoor seating, 2022

In 2013, Portland Monthly's Benjamin Tepler wrote, "Fish Sauce's most attractive angles are its impressive, thoughtful cocktail list and its role as an under-the-radar neighborhood bargain, offering affordable happy hour bites." He opined, "You can find better versions of these Southeast Asian staples elsewhere around town. The fish sauce wings lack a potent, fermented punch, the Hainese chicken is dry and the sauce too sweet ... and the pho has more personality down 82nd street." Tepler described the happy hour menu as "dirt-cheap" and said the cocktails "are the main event here". Michael C. Zusman of Willamette Week said of the restaurant: "It's not remote, dingy or flawless, but there are enough attractive offerings to make Fish Sauce a worthwhile stop, especially for those hankering for chao tom on the West Side." Krista Garcia included Fish Sauce in Eater Portland's 2020 overview of "Where to Find Steamy Bowls of Pho in Portland".

== See also ==
- List of Vietnamese restaurants
