= Phở Kim =

Vietnamese restaurant in Portland, Oregon, U.S.

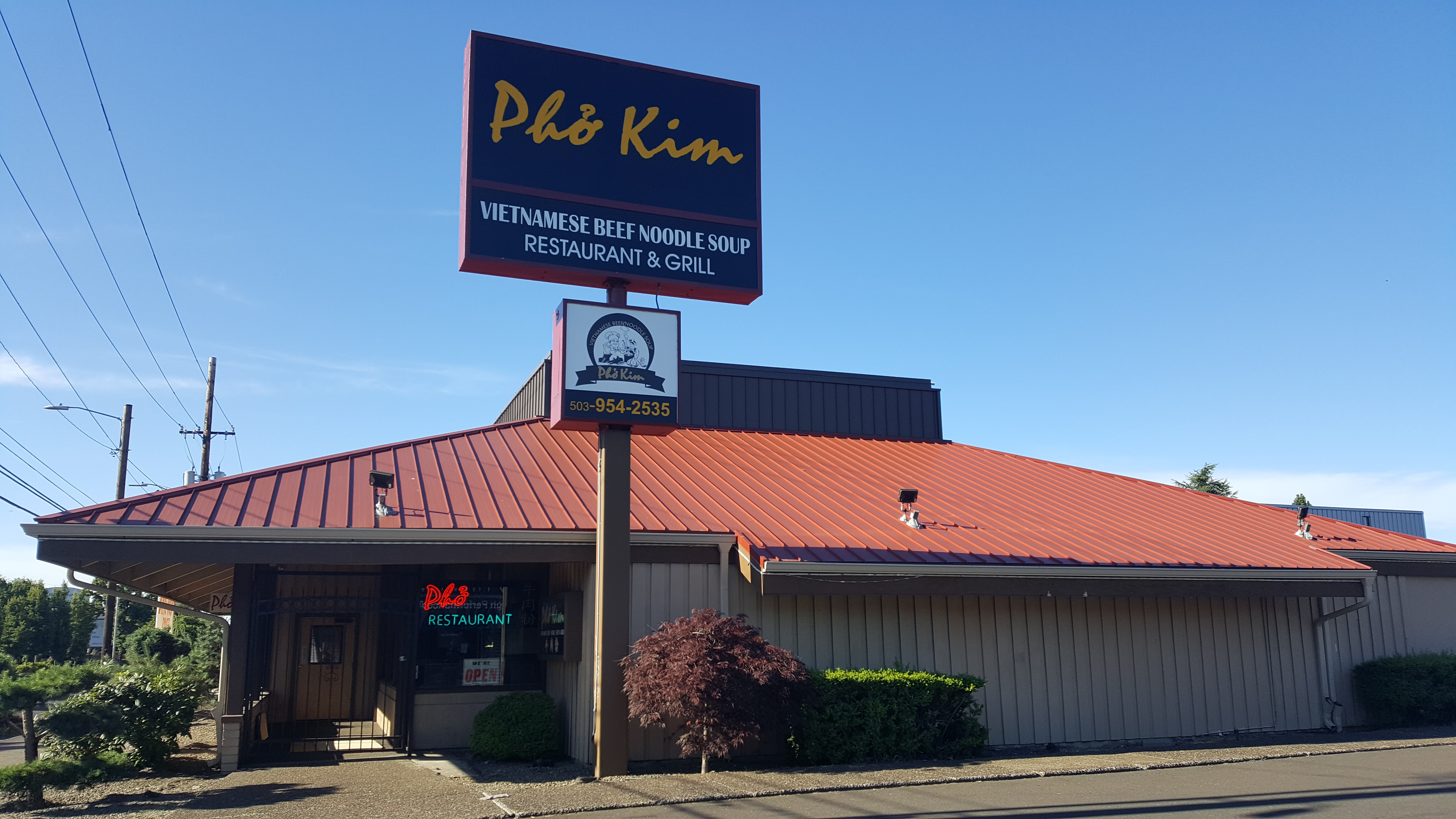
- The restaurant's exterior, 2022
- Interactive map of Phở Kim

Restaurant information
- Established: 2013
- Owner: Kim Lam
- Chef: Tony Tien
- Food type: Vietnamese
- Location: 2204 Southeast 82nd Avenue, Portland, Multnomah, Oregon, 97216, United States
- Coordinates: 45.5070°N 122.5784°W
- Website: phokimpdx.com

Phở Kim is a Vietnamese restaurant in Portland, Oregon, United States. Established in 2013, the family-owned restaurant is located on 82nd Avenue in the southeast Portland part of the Montavilla neighborhood.

== Description ==
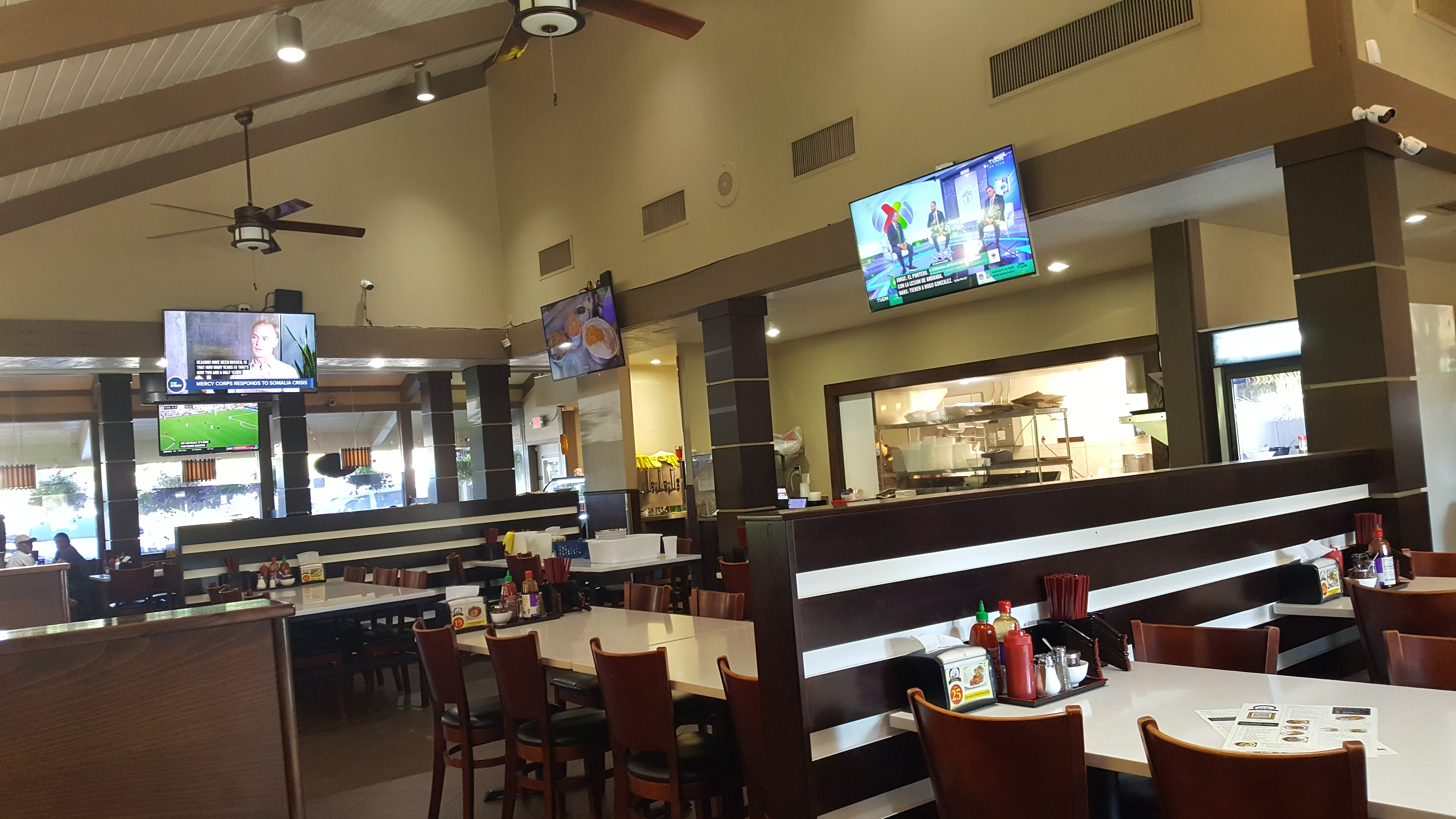
The restaurant's interior in 2022

Phở Kim is a Vietnamese restaurant specializing in pho, located on 82nd Avenue in the southeast Portland part of the Montavilla neighborhood. The restaurant has house-made noodles.

== History ==
The family-owned restaurant opened in 2013. Owner Kim Lam manages operations and her husband Tony Tien serves as chef.

During the COVID-19 pandemic, Phở Kim closed temporarily and implemented seating restrictions to comply with social distancing guidelines. The restaurant caught fire in 2020, forcing a temporary close for repairs and installation of a new roof. A grand reopening ceremony was held in March 2022.

== Reception ==
Samantha Bakall and Michael Russell of The Oregonian gave Phở Kim honorable mention in a 2017 list of "Portland's 5 best bowls of pho", writing:

When people talk about 82nd Avenue's best everyday bowls of pho, Pho Oregon and Pho Hung 82 come up a lot more often than Pho Kim. That should probably change. This large restaurant, a former Carrows, serves a tasty, relatively inexpensive bowl of pho. Better yet, if you're craving Vietnamese food later in the day, Pho Kim has a full menu beyond soup, and stays open until at least 10 p.m.

They also said of the noodles and ambiance: "Probably the weakest point of the bowl, the noodles weren't bad, just a little clumpy at first, but came apart a bit as the bowl cooled... The redecorated Carrows/Maine Street Restaurant/Saigon Pearl space greets you with several columns of cardboard boxes, but is otherwise pleasant." In Eater Portland's 2020 overview of "Where to Find Steamy Bowls of Pho in Portland", Krista Garcia wrote:

Pho Kim might look like any other 82nd Avenue Vietnamese restaurant, but the pho is out-of-the-ordinary. The soup is distinguished by the use house-made rice noodles, a rarity in the U.S. The menu doesn't make mention of this special addition, but ask for 'big noodles,' and if available, the pho will come with wider-than-usual fresh rice noodles instead of the typical dried version.

== See also ==
- List of Vietnamese restaurants
