= An Xuyên Bakery =

Bakery in Portland, Oregon, U.S.

- The bakery's exterior in 2026
- Interactive map of An Xuyên Bakery

Restaurant information
- Established: 1995
- Food type: Vietnamese; French
- Location: 5345 Southeast Foster Road, Portland, Multnomah, Oregon, 97206, United States
- Coordinates: 45.4951°N 122.6073°W
- Website: mng890.wixsite.com/an-xuyen-bakery

An Xuyên Bakery is a bakery in Portland, Oregon, United States.

== Description ==
An Xuyên Bakery is a French-Vietnamese bakery on Foster Road in southeast Portland's Foster-Powell neighborhood. The menu includes bánh mì, baked goods such as macarons, mooncake, and teacake, baozi, French bread, and pastries such as the Tiger Roll, a Swiss roll with a layer of pandan sponge cake and whipped cream. Bread for the bánh mì is baked on site daily. Ingredients include cucumbers, pickled carrot and daikon, cilantro, and jalapeños; other fillings include pâté, Vietnamese ham, chipotle chicken, lemongrass pork, tofu, and faux meat.

== History ==
The bakery was established in 1995. An Xuyên supplied bread to Baby Doll Pizza and Lardo, as of 2014. The restaurant Expatriate used butter rolls made by An Xuyên, as of 2021.

== Reception ==
In 2016, Lizzy Acker of Willamette Week said An Xuyên had "ridiculously affordable prices" and quipped, "You'll pay more in gas to get there than you will for a filling meal." The chipotle chicken bánh mì was included in the newspaper's list of the city's best "cheap eats" in 2026.

In 2020, Krista Garcia and Alex Frane included the bakery in Eater Portland's lists of Portland's "top pandan treats" and 14 "excellent" sandwich shops in the city, respectively. Frane said An Xuyên "has quietly served some of the city's best bánh mì to a faithful crowd for years now". He also included the bakery in Thrillist's 2020 list of the best sandwiches in Portland. Garcia also included the business in Eater Portland's 2021 list of 11 "big-deal" bánh mì in the city. Katrina Yentch included the restaurant in the website's 2022 list of "18 Knockout Spots for Affordable Dining in Portland". Michelle Lopez and Janey Wong included the shop in Eater Portland's 2025 overview of the city's best bakeries.

== See also ==
- List of bakeries
- List of French restaurants
- List of Vietnamese restaurants
