= Foreign National (bar) =

Defunct bar and restaurant in Seattle, Washington, U.S.

- Interactive map of Foreign National

Restaurant information
- Location: Seattle, King, Washington, United States
- Coordinates: 47.6142°N 122.3274°W

Foreign National was a bar and restaurant in Seattle, Washington, United States. It operated from 2016 to 2025.

== Description ==
The bar and restaurant Foreign National was adjacent to the Vietnamese fusion restaurant Stateside; the two businesses haven been referred to as "sibling" establishments. The 28-seat bar had a large mosaic disco ball and also served Vietnamese cuisine. The menu included cheeseburger bao, chicken curry puffs, and fried potatoes. Among drinks was the Singapore Sling, the Expat Punch with passion fruit juice and Taittinger, and the Long Thailand Iced Tea, which had brandy, rum, rye, and Thai tea.

== History ==
Eric Johnson was the chef and owner. The bar opened in 2016 and closed on July 31, 2025.

The interior was designed by Callie Meyer.

== Reception ==
In Condé Nast Traveler's 2018 list of Seattle's fifteen best bars, Jessica Voelker wrote, "You know you've been to a great cocktail bar when you walk out feeling pleasantly disoriented, like you've just been transported to some faraway land. A little bit tiki, a little bit disco, Foreign National is such a bar."

== See also ==
- List of defunct restaurants of the United States
- List of Vietnamese restaurants
- Vietnamese in Seattle
