= Friendship Kitchen =

Restaurant in Portland, Oregon, U.S.

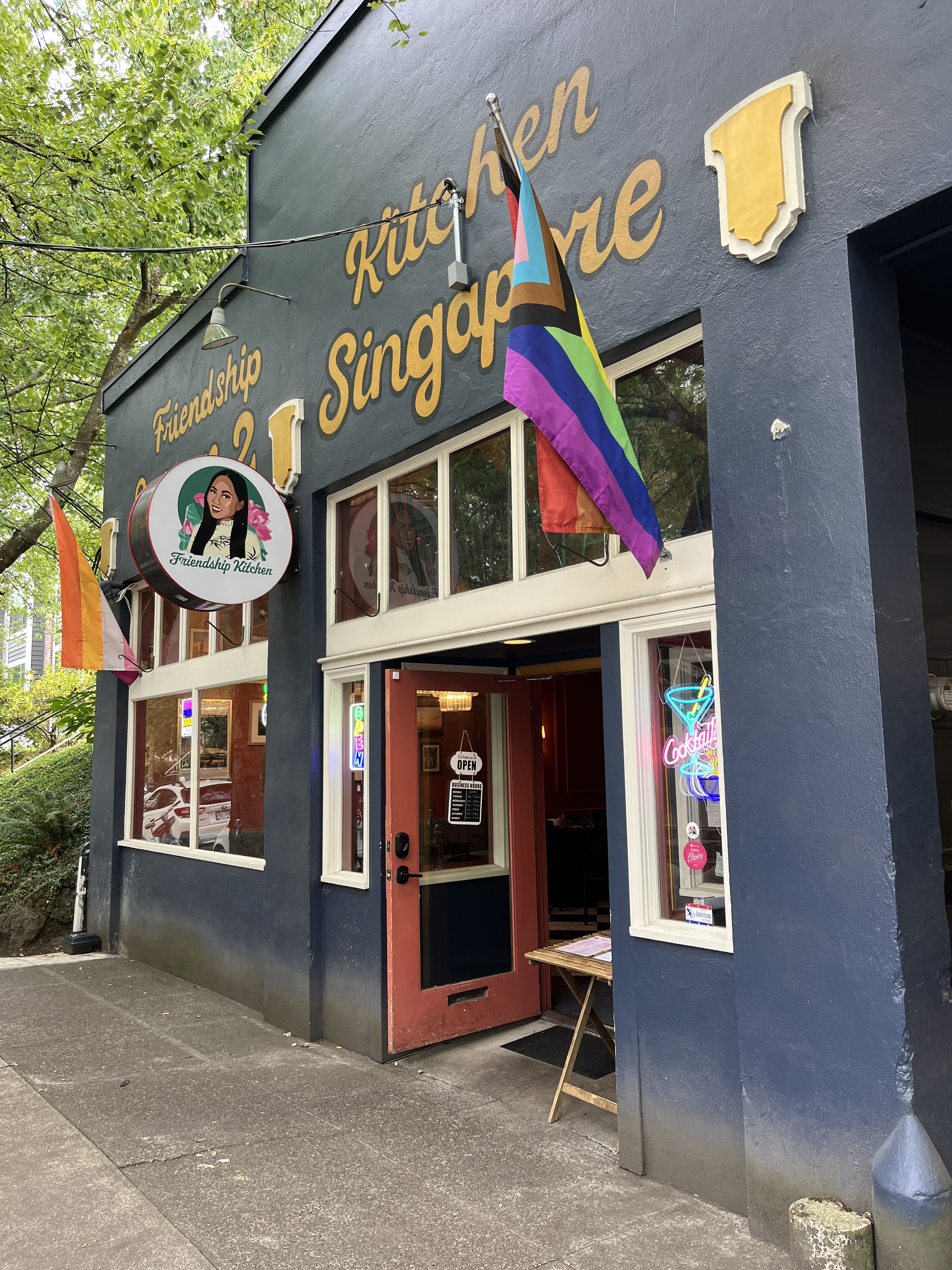
- Exterior of Friendship Kitchen NW: From Saigon 2 Singapore in northwest Portland, Oregon, 2025
- Interactive map of Friendship Kitchen

Restaurant information
- Established: 2021
- Owners: Trang Nguyen; Wei-En Tan
- Head chef: Trang Nguyen
- Food type: Vietnamese; Singaporean
- Location: Portland, Multnomah, Oregon, United States
- Coordinates: 45.5266°N 122.6417°W

Friendship Kitchen is a restaurant with two locations in Portland, Oregon, United States. The original restaurant opened in 2021, serving Vietnamese cuisine. The outpost Friendship Kitchen NW: From Saigon 2 Singapore opened in 2023 and serves Singaporean and Vietnamese cuisine.

== Description ==
The Asian Pacific American- and LGBTQ-owned restaurant Friendship Kitchen operates in Portland, Oregon. The original restaurant on Glisan Street in the northeast Portland part of the Kerns neighborhood serves Vietnamese cuisine. The restaurant has a patio and the interior has neon signs and patterned lanterns. The menu includes bánh mì, bún bò Huế, noodle dishes, pho, and cocktails. The curry dish cà ri is called Keep Calm and Cà Ri On. On the drink menu, the Fresh Off the Boat has ginger-infused gin and the White Men Tears has rum and coconut milk. The Pho-Jito has rum, Combier, cilantro, and a syrup made with cardamom, cinnamon, and star anise. The Thai'd Up is an alcoholic and iced Thai tea. Other drinks use lychee, mango, tamarind, vodka, and whiskey.

Friendship Kitchen NW: From Saigon 2 Singapore operates on Thurman Street in northwest Portland's Northwest District. In addition to Vietnamese food, the outpost serves Singaporean cuisine such as bánh xèo, Hainanese chicken rice, and laksa. The outpost also serves ragout with braised chicken in tomato-red wine sauce, as well as garlic butter shrimp and steak frites, soy-sugarcane drumsticks with vegan fish sauce, and garden rolls with tofu skin.

In addition to pho, both locations have served bánh tét around the holiday Tết.

== History ==
Trang Nguyen opened the original restaurant in northeast Portland in 2021, later than a previously announced opening date of November 2020. The outpost Friendship Kitchen NW: From Saigon 2 Singapore opened in October 2023. Since Nguyen married Wei-En Tan and became known as Trang Nguyen Tan, the couple have been credited for operating both establishments. Stem Wine Bar has been described as a "sister" business to Friendship Kitchen.

== Reception ==
In 2024, Nick Woo, Krista Garcia, and Janey Wong included Friendship Kitchen in Eater Portland's overview of Portland's best Vietnamese restaurants, and Waz Wu included Friendship Kitchen NW in the website's overview of the city's "most comforting" vegan noodle soups. Friendship Kitchen placed second in the Best Vietnamese Restaurant category of Willamette Week's annual Best of Portland readers' poll in 2024.

== See also ==
- LGBTQ culture in Portland, Oregon
- List of restaurant chains in the United States
- List of Vietnamese restaurants
