= Double Dragon (restaurant) =

Restaurant and bar in Portland, Oregon, U.S.

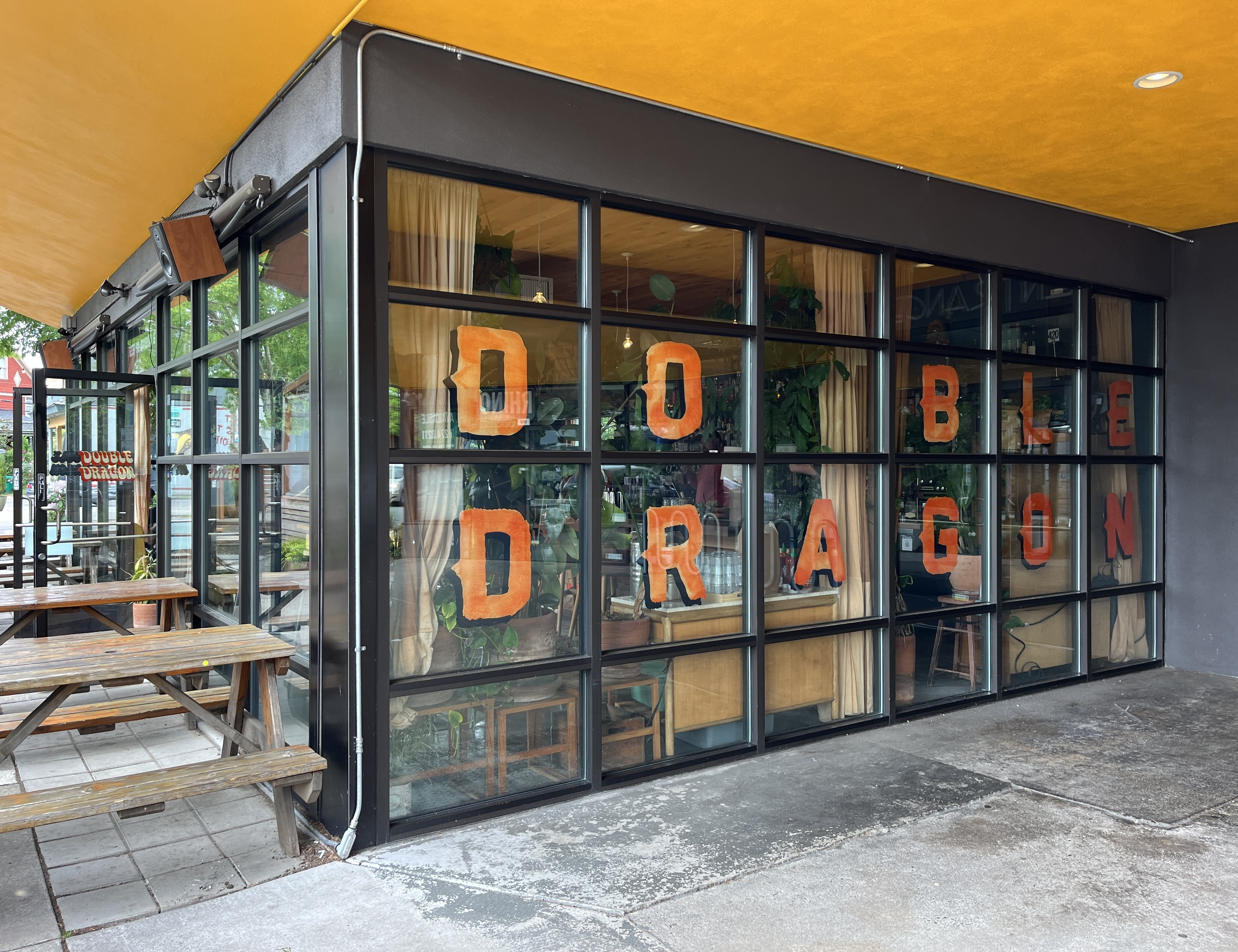
- The restaurant's exterior in 2025
- Interactive map of Double Dragon

Restaurant information
- Established: November 22, 2011
- Owner: Rob Walls
- Food type: Asian; Vietnamese
- Location: 1235 Southeast Division Street, Portland, Multnomah, Oregon, 97202, United States
- Coordinates: 45.5050°N 122.6532°W
- Seating capacity: 30 (2011)
- Website: doubledragonpdx.com

Double Dragon is a restaurant and bar in Portland, Oregon's Hosford-Abernethy neighborhood, in the United States. Chef and owner Rob Walls opened the bánh mì sandwich shop in 2011, which was later expanded to include more food and drink options.

== Description ==
Double Dragon is a restaurant and bar on Division Street in southeast Portland's Hosford-Abernethy neighborhood. Initially, the sandwich shop's menu included "Portland-influenced" bánh mì and soups, including carrot veloute. Sandwich options included pork belly with jalapeño, pineapple, and brown sugar, and roast duck with orange, ginger, pepper, and cloves. Bacon was an add-on option for any sandwich. The menu was later expanded to include moules-frites with kimchi, Mexican-style grilled corn, Miso Disco Fries, char siu pork buns, duck wings with a tamarind glaze, and roasted mushroom congee, as well as cocktails. Among the new drinks with "unusual flavor combinations" was a tincture made from seaweed, honey infused with lapsang souchong and pho syrup.

Upon opening, Double Dragon's seating capacity was approximately 30 people, and lunch and dinner were served daily from 11:30am to 9pm. In 2013, Double Dragon's owner called the described the menu as "Orient by Occident".

== History ==
Chef and owner Rob Walls opened Double Dragon on November 22, 2011, replacing Artemis Cafe.

In December 2012, Walls confirmed plans to renovate the kitchen, expand the food menu, and offer cocktails starting in January. He said the kitchen improvements would "allow us to fully push beyond something that's basically a banh mi shop right now into a place that does all kinds of non-traditional renditions of dishes from all Asian cuisines", and described the new menu options as "a mix of riffs on traditional dishes from all over Asia... other things that have little to do with Asian cuisine but that fit the feel and the flavors that we're putting out and things that sort of fall in between". During a first anniversary celebration on December 5, 2012, the restaurant offered complimentary food from the pending menu. To commemorate the expansion, Double Dragon hosted karaoke and happy hour specials on June 3, 2013.

For Super Bowl XLVII (2013), Double Dragon offered discounted catering orders and duck wings with tamarind, smoked chilis, and palm sugar. For Eater Portland's Burger Week in 2013, which invited non-burger restaurants to create limited burger-inspired menu options, Double Dragon served an "Asian-inspired" bacon burger with five spices, a fermented bean paste sauce, Sichuan peppercorn, Thai chili, and sambal aioli, and pickles on the side. The restaurant offered guests complimentary rum horchata, gift cards, and drink specials for a second anniversary celebration on November 22, 2013. In 2014, Double Dragon hosted live music curated by the local record label Banana Stand Media. Shows by "secret, unannounced" performers were held each Monday from June 1 to Labor Day.

During the COVID-19 pandemic, Double Dragon improved the sidewalk patio with heat lamps, low fencing, roofing, and umbrellas.

== Reception ==
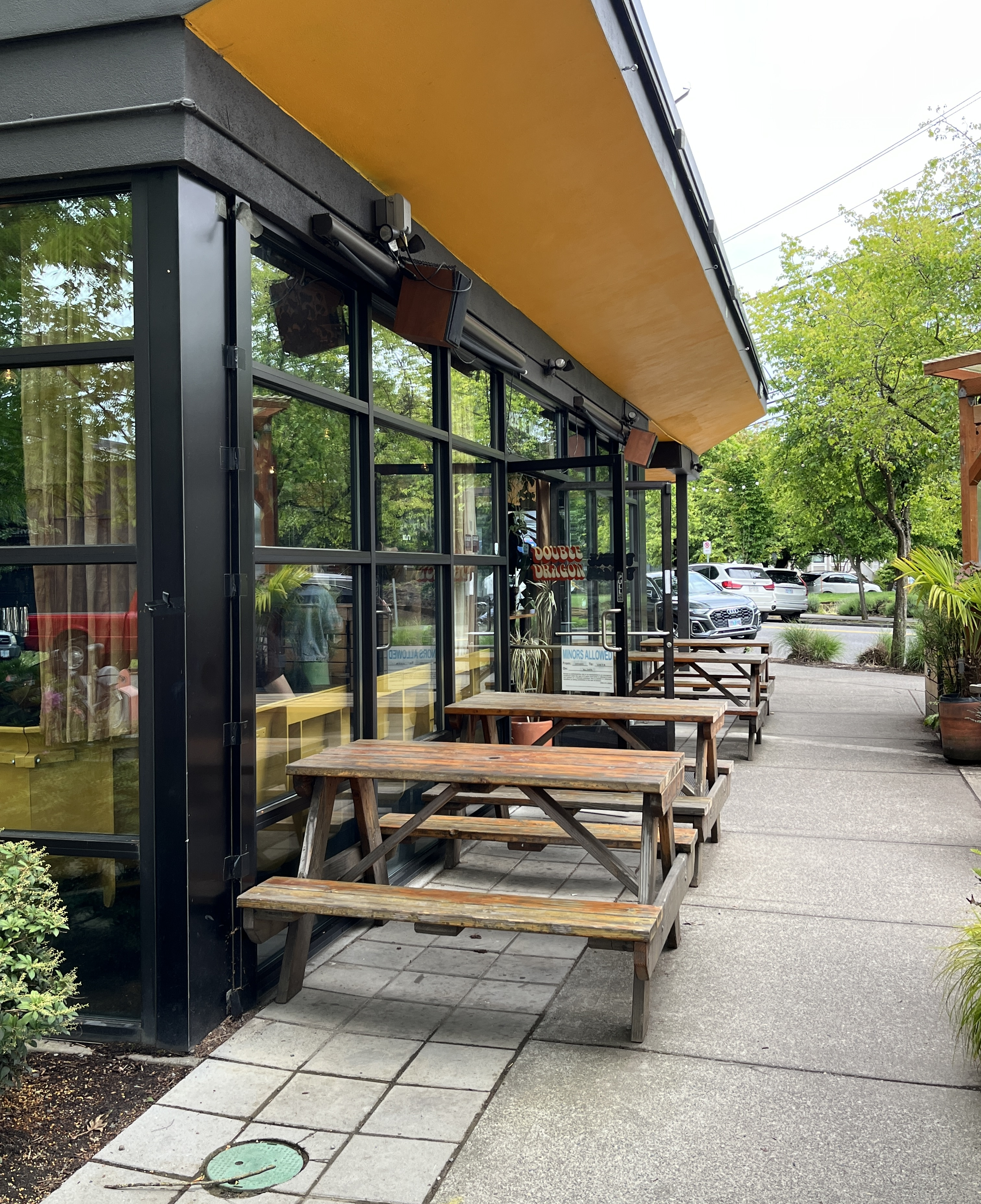
Front entrance, 2025

Drew Tyson ranked Double Dragon's pork belly bánh mì number 10 in Thrillist's 2015 list of "Portland's 11 Best Sandwiches". He also included the dish in Thrillist's 2015 list of "The 11 Best Pork Belly Dishes in Portland", in which he said, "Don't ask any questions, just order it". In The Daily Meal's 2015 list of "5 Amazing Sandwich Shops in Portland, Oregon", Alex Frane wrote:

Double Dragon may not be the most authentic bánh mì in town, nor the cheapest (purists will balk at paying $9 for bánh mì), but the pork belly banh mi here is arguably the best version of the sandwich in town. There are only a few sandwiches on the menu here, including a vegan bánh mì made with fried chickpeas, and all of them are excellent. The rice bowls, burgers, and fries are good too, if you don't feel like a bánh mì for some reason.

In his 2016 list of "Portland's 10 best ramen shops", Michael Russell of The Oregonian gave honorable mention to Double Dragon, writing, "This Southeast Portland bánh mì shop makes a Thai-inspired ramen mellowed with coconut milk and brightened by kaffir lime. The presentation can be sloppy, but the broth is comforting and the noodles are well-cooked." In 2017, Double Dragon ranked third place in the Best Baguette category of Willamette Week's annual readers' poll.

During the pandemic, Frane included Double Dragon in Eater Portland's 2021 list of "15 Restaurants Offering Winter-Friendly Outdoor Seating". He described the outdoor improvements and wrote, "SE Division cocktail bar and restaurant Double Dragon has always had a nice patio, but in the Before Times it was mostly relegated to summertime revelry... Order couple of the bar's tropical cocktail and a thick pork belly or tofu sandwich, and winter will feel a world away."

== See also ==
- List of Vietnamese restaurants
