= Mắm nêm =

Vietnamese fermented fish sauce

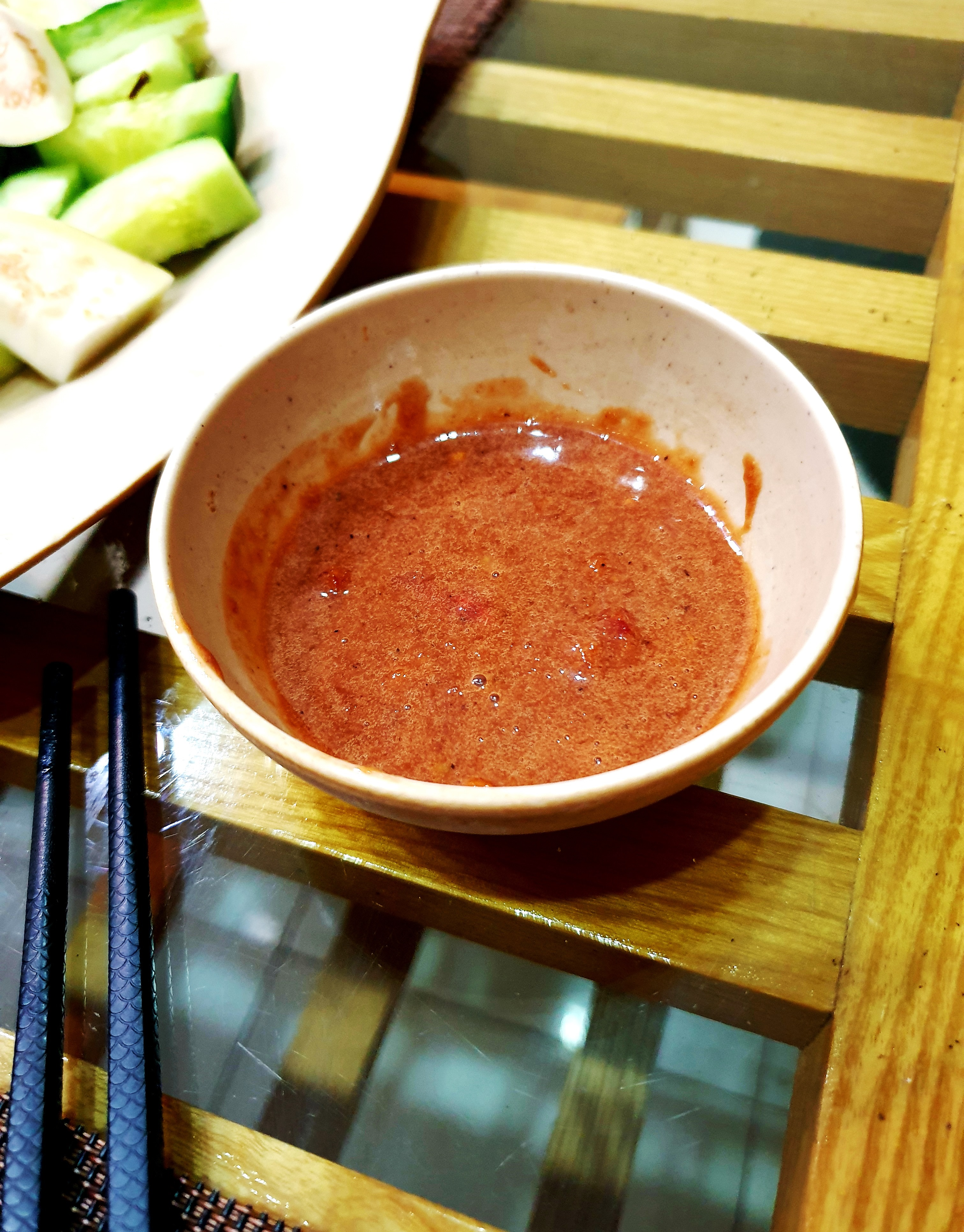
- A bowl of mắm nêm
- Alternative names: Mam nem
- Type: Condiment
- Place of origin: Vietnam
- Region or state: Central Vietnam
- Associated cuisine: Cham and Vietnamese cuisine
- Created by: Cham people
- Main ingredients: Fermented Fish
- Ingredients generally used: Pineapple
- Similar dishes: Nước mắm

Mắm nêm (Vietnamese: [mɐ̌m neʲm]) is a sauce made of fermented fish. Unlike the more familiar nước mắm (fish sauce), mắm nêm is powerfully pungent, similar to shrimp paste. Many of the regions that produce fish sauce, for example Central Vietnam, also produce mắm nêm. It is commonly mixed with sugar, pineapple, and spices to make a prepared sauce called mắm nêm pha sẵn, the key ingredient in bún mắm.

== See also ==
- Budu – Fish sauce originating from east coast of Peninsular Malaysia
- Mắm (restaurant) – Vietnamese restaurant in New York City, U.S. named for the sauce
- Padaek – Lao pickled or fermented fish condiment
- Pla ra – Southeast Asian fermented fish seasoning
- Prahok – Cambodian salted and fermented fish paste
- Saeu-jeot – Fermented shrimp in Korean cuisine
- Shrimp paste – Fermented condiment
