= Stateside (restaurant) =

Defunct restaurant in Seattle, Washington, U.S.

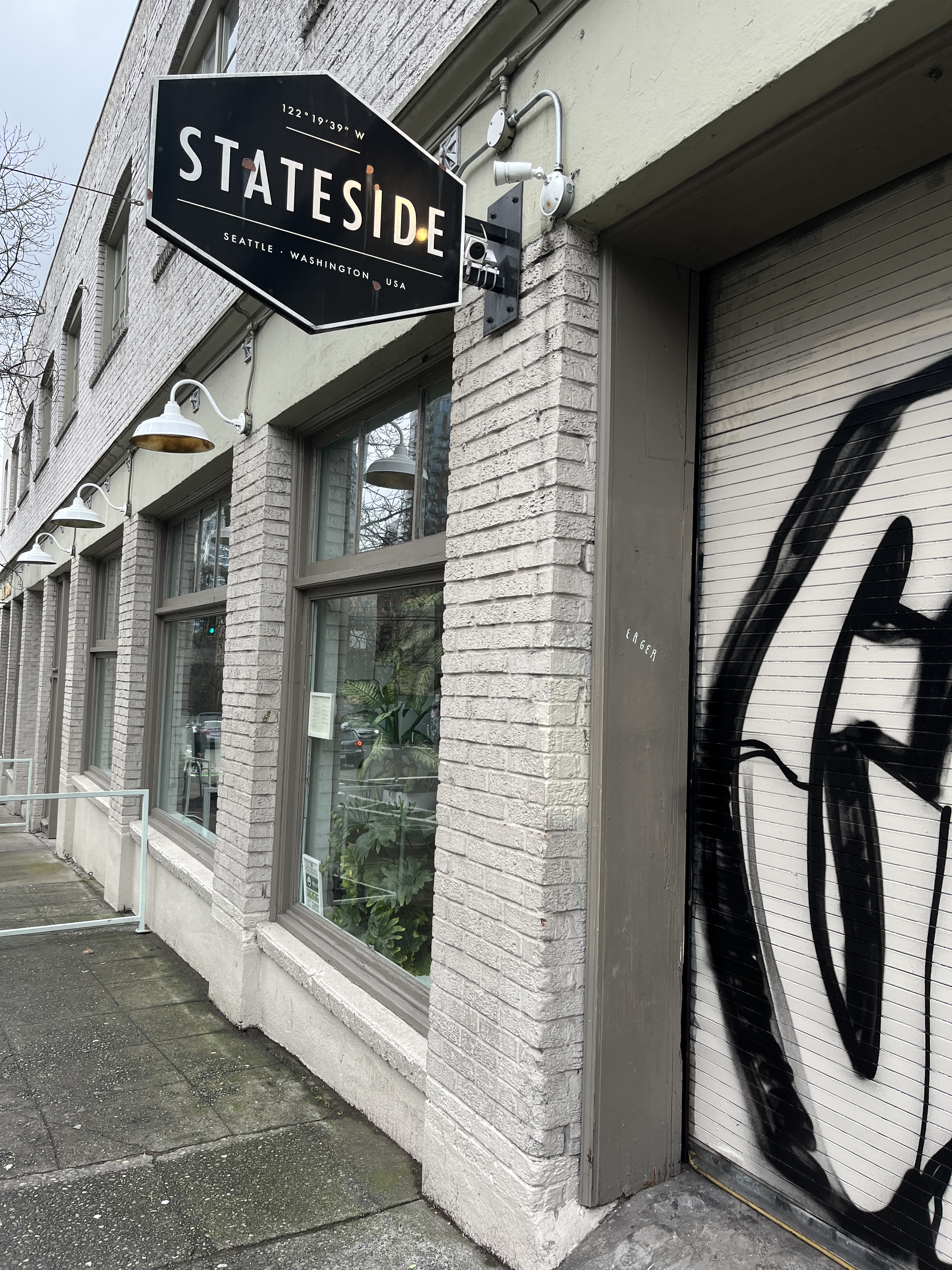
- The restaurant's exterior, 2023
- Interactive map of Stateside

Restaurant information
- Location: Seattle, King, Washington, United States
- Coordinates: 47.6141°N 122.3277°W

Stateside was a Vietnamese fusion restaurant in Seattle, Washington. The restaurant closed permanently in 2025.

== Description ==
Eater Seattle called Stateside a "French-Vietnamese concept" and a "Southeast Asian-influenced" restaurant. The website's Adam H. Callghan said of the interior: "Stateside's subtle, tropical hues, palm frond wallpaper, naked light bulbs, and staghorn ferns help transport you to Southeast Asia." Chelsea Lin of Seattle Magazine described the restaurant as "stylish".

The menu included bánh mì, clam rice, fried chicken, and Cha Ca La Vong with black cod marinated in galangal and turmeric, served on rice vermicelli with cilantro, dill, and mint. The restaurant also served pasta with clams, wheat noodles, and a sauce of Shaoxing wine and Maggi butter, as well as Taittinger Champagne. The brunch menu included charcoal waffle with mango jam.

== History ==
Eric Johnson opened Stateside with Seth Hammond in December 2014, in a former parking garage. The restaurant began serving lunch in February 2015, followed by brunch in November 2015. Avery Adams was a chef at Stateside.

In 2016, Johnson and Hammond announced plans to open a small cocktail lounge next door called Foreign National. The bar opened in June.

Stateside closed permanently in 2025.

== Reception ==
Stateside was Seattle Metropolitan's Restaurant of the Year in 2015. The magazine's Allecia Vermillion included the business in a 2021 overview of the best restaurants on Capitol Hill. Johnson received a James Beard Foundation Award in the Best Chef: Northwest category in 2019. In 2022, Seattle Metropolitan included Stateside in a 2022 list of the city's 100 best restaurants, and Vermillion included the business in a list of the city's best Vietnamese restaurants. Gabe Guarantee, Mark Van Streefkerk, and Jade Yamazaki Stewart included Stateside in Eater Seattle's 2022 list of 25 "essential" restaurants on Capitol Hill. Stateside was also included in the website's 2025 overview of the best restaurants on Capitol Hill.

Condé Nast Traveler described Stateside as "a serious restaurant that doesn't act like one". The Stranger included Stateside in a 2017 overview of Seattle's best Vietnamese restaurants and said, "One of the best restaurants in Seattle, Stateside is consistently great, wearing its Vietnamese-French mash-up on its sleeve. The crispy duck fresh rolls are divine, the master stock crispy chicken rivals any other fried chicken in town (yes, Skillet, looking at you), and the tamarind beef and kohlrabi salad is a surprisingly delicate and interesting take on a dish you've had a million times and were unimpressed with."

== See also ==
- List of defunct restaurants of the United States
- List of Vietnamese restaurants
- Vietnamese in Seattle
