= Bambu (restaurant) =

Dessert drink chain

Bambū
- Industry: Restaurants
- Area served: United States, Canada
- Products: Chè

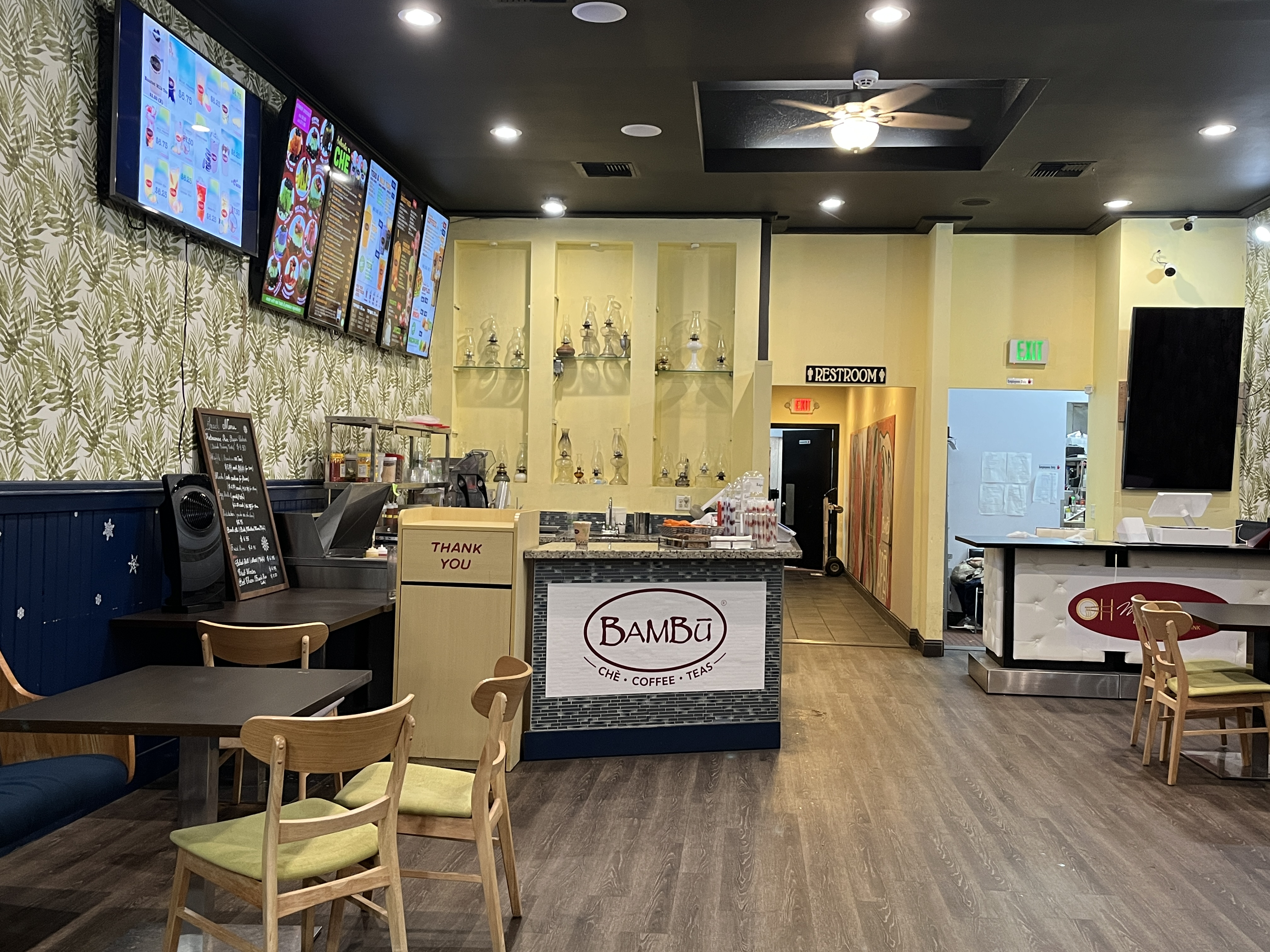
Interior of the Seattle location, 2023

Bambū is a dessert drink chain that specializes in chè and other Vietnamese desserts and drinks. In 2021, QSR described the San Jose-based company as "the original and only Vietnamese-Chè dessert drink chain".

Founded in 2008, the company operates more than 70 locations in 22 U.S. states and Canada, as of 2021.

== Locations ==
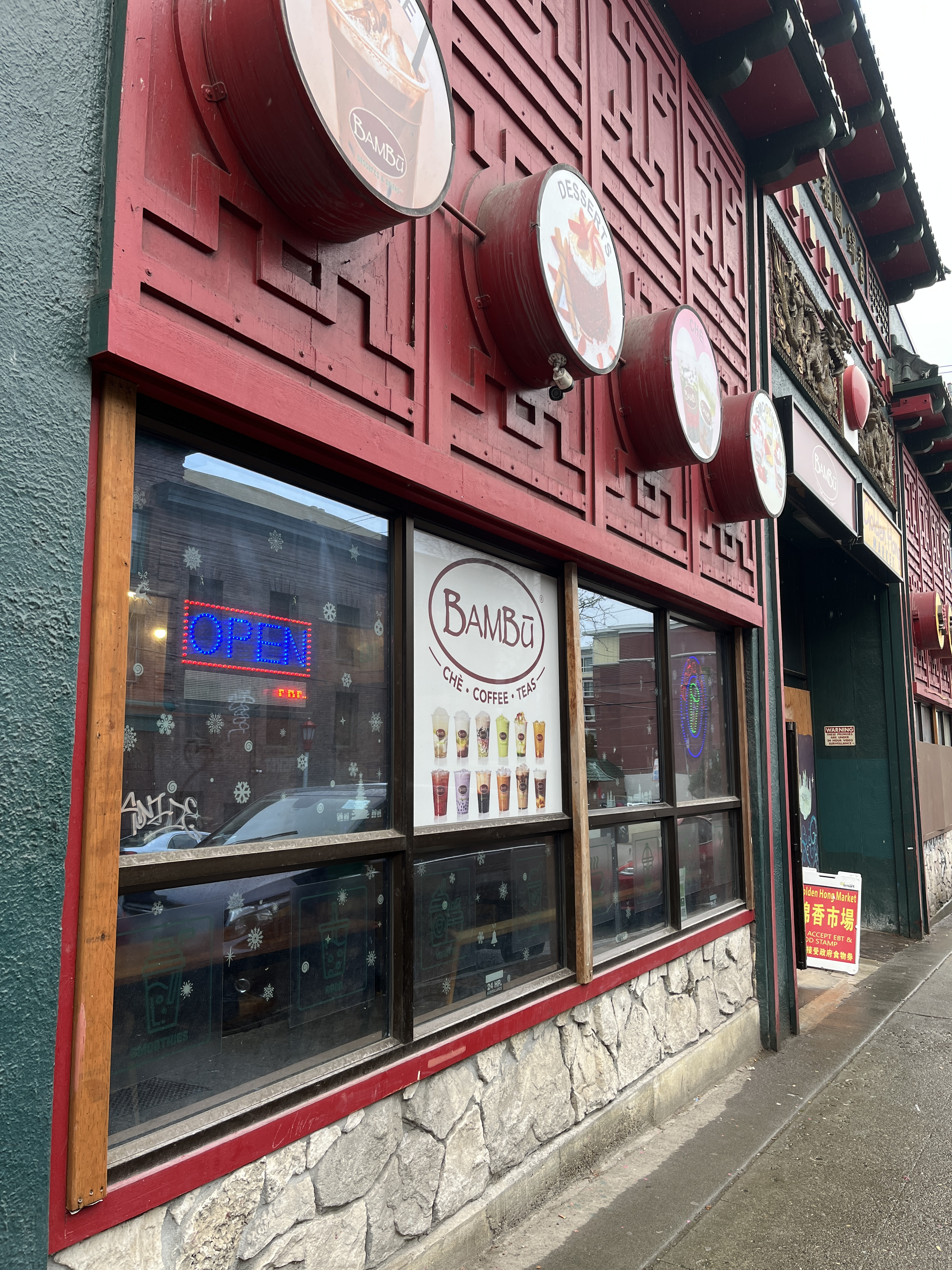
Exterior of the Seattle location, 2023

The business has operated in the following locations:

- Ann Arbor, Michigan
- Holland, Michigan
- Honolulu, Hawaii
- Milwaukee, Wisconsin
- Portland, Oregon
- Seattle (Chinatown–International District), Washington

== See also ==
- List of Vietnamese restaurants
