= Thanh Son Tofu and Bakery =

Restaurant in Seattle, Washington, U.S.

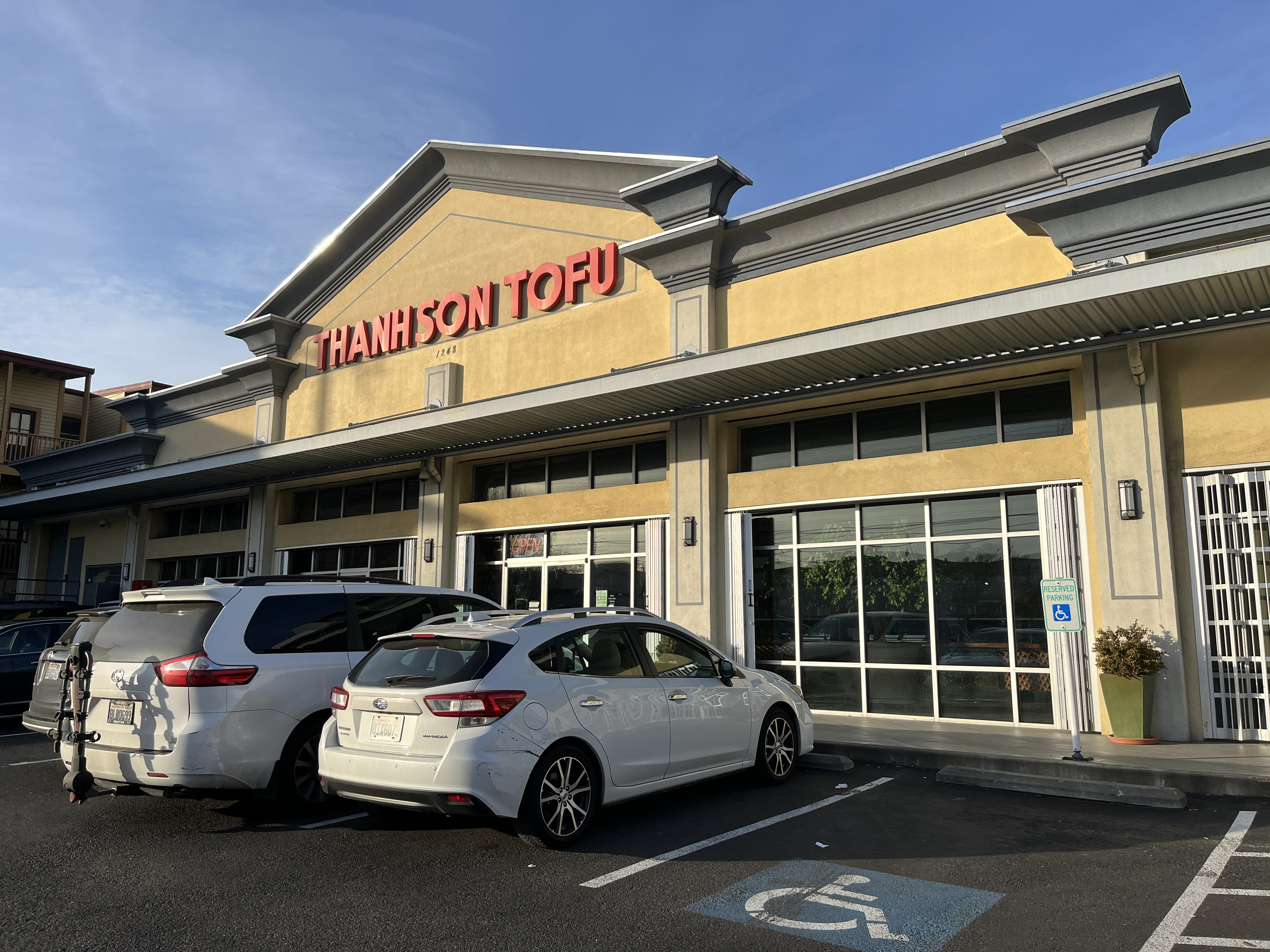
- The bakery's exterior, 2023
- Interactive map of Thanh Son Tofu and Bakery

Restaurant information
- Dress code: Vietnamese
- Location: 1248 South King Street, Seattle, King, Washington, 98144, United States
- Coordinates: 47.5987°N 122.3152°W

Thanh Son Tofu and Bakery is a Vietnamese restaurant and bakery in the Little Saigon part of Seattle's Chinatown–International District, in the U.S. state of Washington.

== Description and history ==
The Vietnamese and specialty store Thanh Son Tofu and Bakery operates in the Little Saigon part of Seattle's Chinatown–International District. The business was primarily a tofu producer before opening a deli on King Street. The restaurant serves banh mi and che options include beans, fruit, jellies, sweet rice, and tapioca. Thanh Son also sells soy milk, including a pandan-flavored variety, as well as tofu pudding with ginger syrup. Banh cuon and wide ride noodles are made on site.

== Reception ==
Allecia Vermillion included Thanh Son in Seattle Metropolitan's 2016 list of the city's best new Asian restaurants. She and Rosin Saez included Thanh Son in the magazine's 2019 list of thirteen Little Saigon restaurants "you can't miss". During the COVID-19 pandemic, Gabe Guarente included the business in Eater Seattle's 2020 overview of the city's "fantastic" Vietnamese food options available via delivery and take-out.

== See also ==
- List of bakeries
- List of Vietnamese restaurants
