= Hanoi Kitchen =

Vietnamese restaurant in Portland, Oregon, U.S.

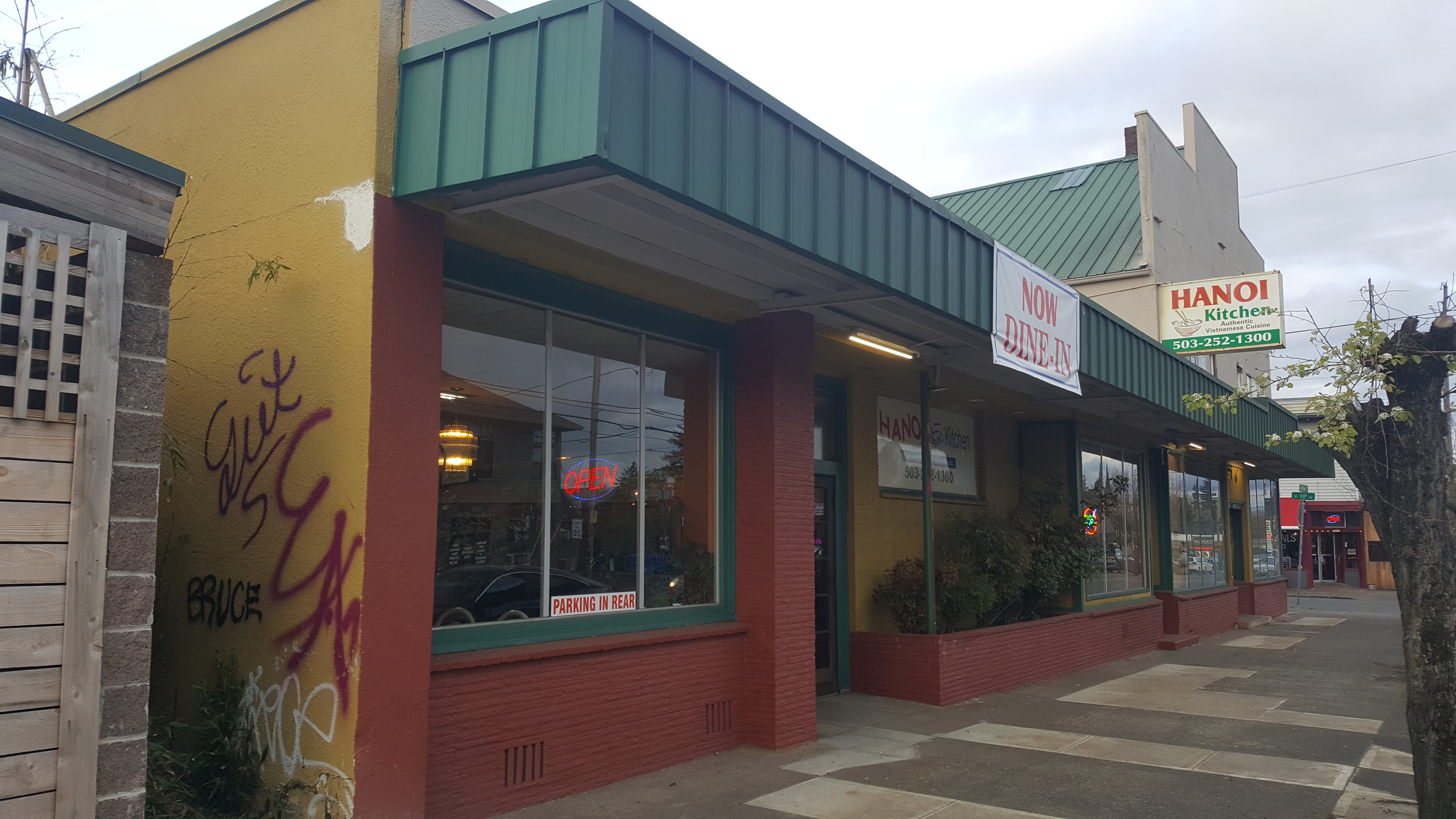
- The restaurant's exterior in 2022
- Interactive map of Hanoi Kitchen

Restaurant information
- Owner: Kim Nguyen
- Food type: Vietnamese
- Location: 7925 Northeast Glisan Street, Portland, Multnomah, Oregon, 97213, United States
- Coordinates: 45.5266°N 122.5819°W
- Website: hanoikitchenpdx.com

Hanoi Kitchen is a Vietnamese restaurant in Portland, Oregon, United States.

== Description ==
Hanoi Kitchen is a family-owned Vietnamese restaurant at the intersection of Glisan Street and 79th Avenue, in the northeast Portland part of the Montavilla neighborhood. The menu has included lemongrass stir fry, lotus root soup, tofu rice crêpes, and vegan phở with ginseng, tofu, and vegetables. Other noodle soups include crabmeat and escargot vermicelli. Hanoi Kitchen also uses a vegetarian version of fish sauce.

According to the Portland Mercury, the mì dê tiêm is "an egg noodle soup with a rich meat broth lightly scented with medicinal goji berries and jujube. Atop the nest of golden noodles are tender-sweet hunks and riblets of braised goat, cubes of tofu and wrinkled sheets of tofu skin, shiitake mushrooms, bok choy, and taro, with a handful of cilantro on top. It's served with a lime wedge and a bowl of fermented tofu dipping sauce; this shit is dank as fuck, all creamy textures and earthy umami-funk, with little flecks of chili for good measure".

Entrees are served with basil, cilantro, shiso, and other herbs. Alex Frane and Nathan Williams of Eater Portland described Hanoi Kitchen as "an under-sung, mellow spot with polished wood floors and a tile ceiling". The Oregonian's Ben Waterhouse described the restaurant as "a large, pleasant place decorated with houseplants, chandeliers, and portraits and landscapes painted by a local doctor".

== History ==
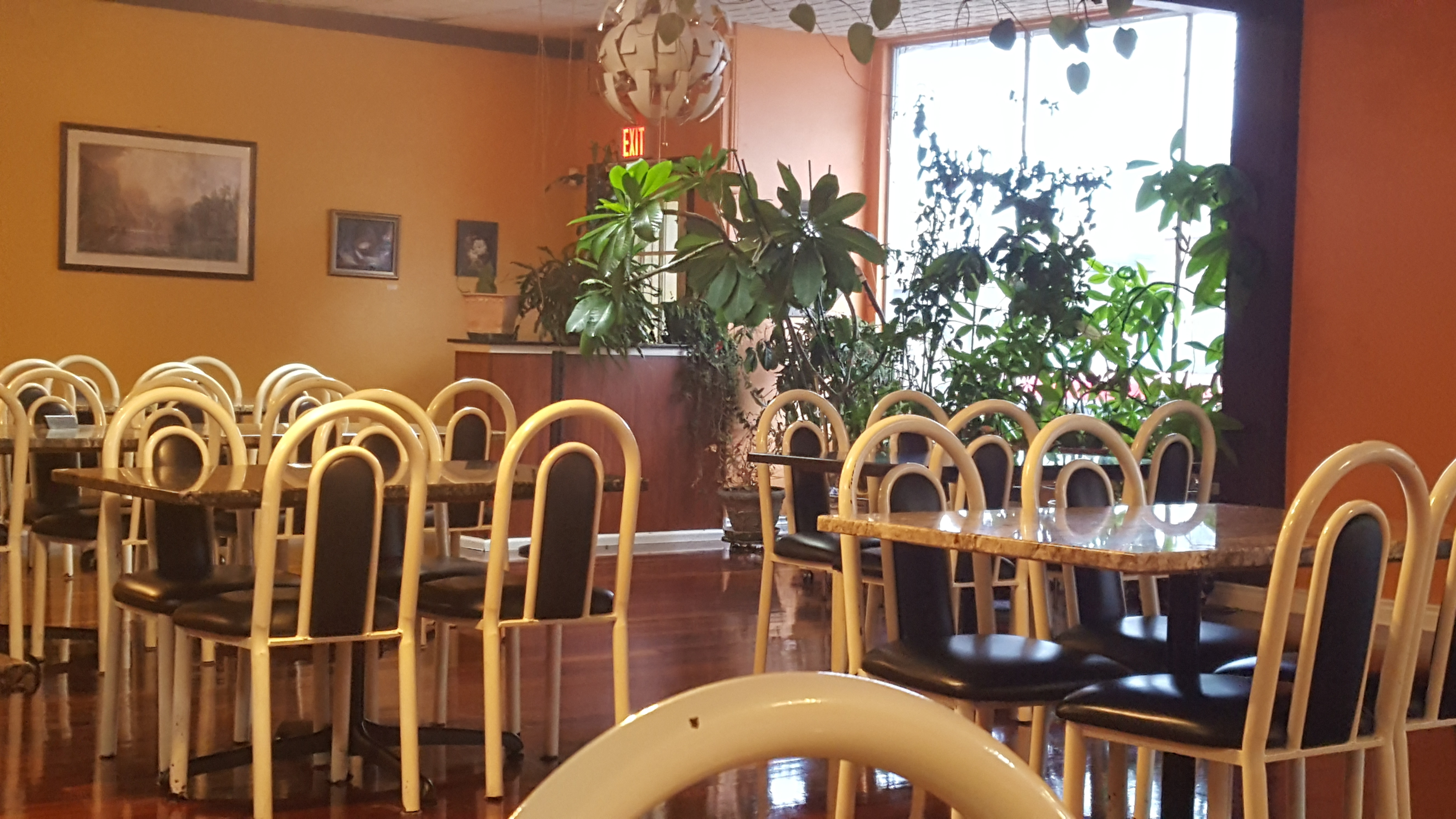
The restaurant's interior, 2022

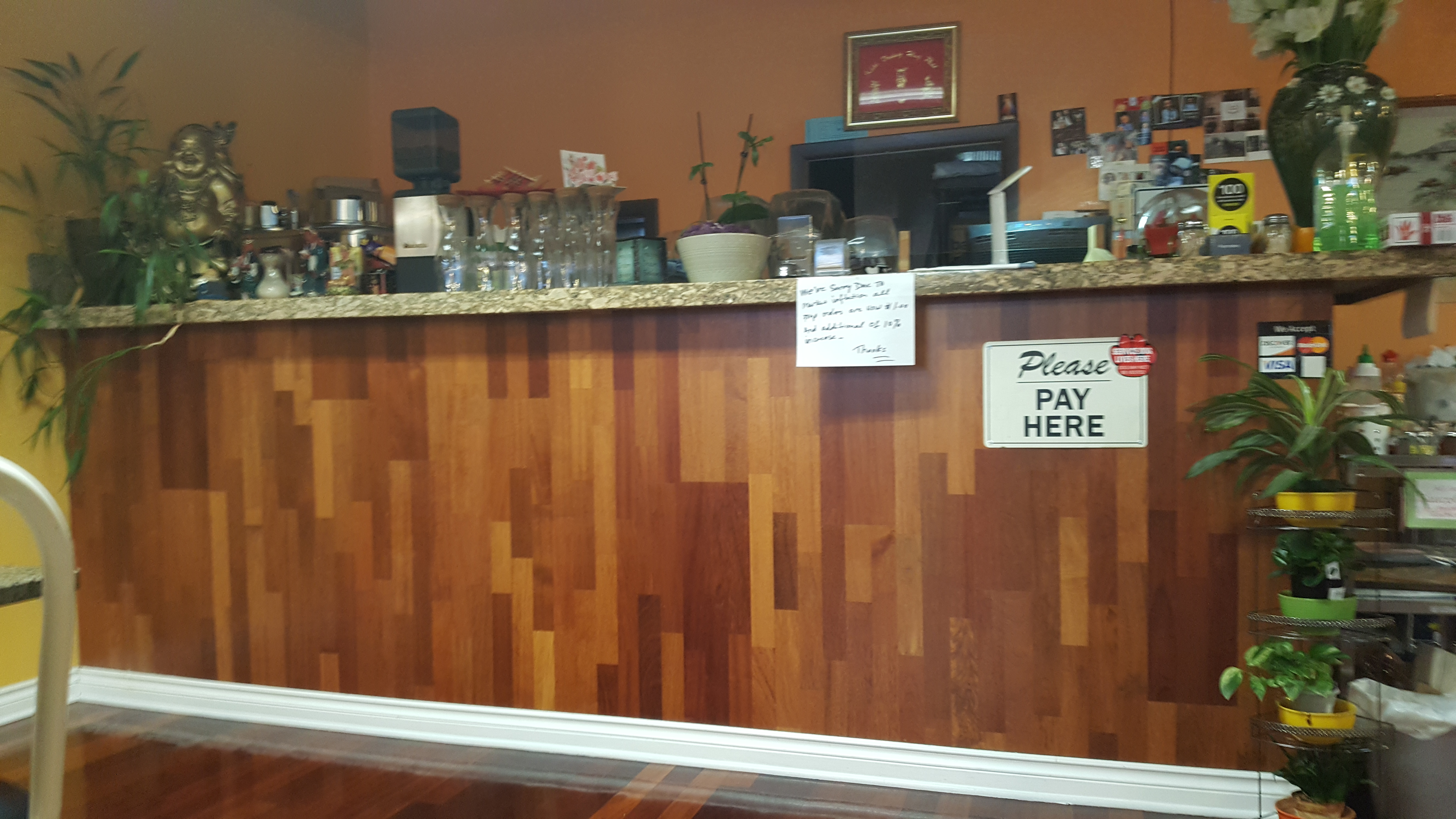
Interior counter, 2022

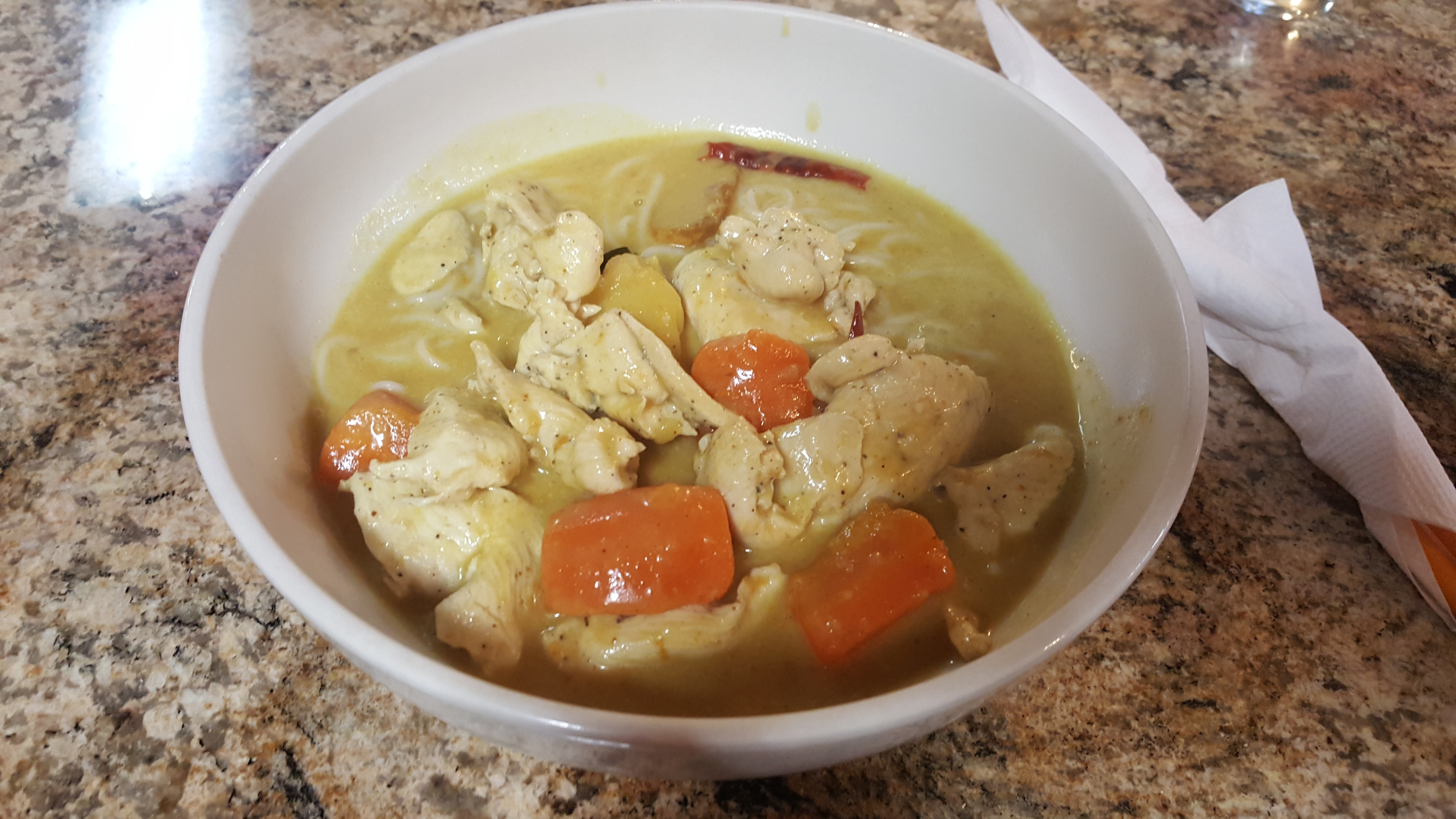
Bún cơm cà ri gà (noodles, chicken, potatoes, carrots, onions, yellow curry)

The restaurant's interior, 2024

Kim Nguyen owns the restaurant, as of 2021. Hanoi Kitchen and several other Asian-owned businesses in East Portland were vandalized in January 2021. In March 2022, Frane and Williams said, "Hanoi Kitchen's recent reopening for dining in — after a long closure necessitated by the pandemic and vandalism — is a cause for celebration."

== Reception ==
In 2015, Ben Waterhouse of The Oregonian favored the bánh cuốn and said "the complimentary tea is better than most". He recommended the bún riêu chả cá chân giò ("pork and tomato broth with thin rice noodles, tofu and fried fish balls stuffed with fish eggs") and bánh cam for dessert. Hanoi Kitchen was included in the Portland Mercury's 2019 list of "50 of Portland's Best Multi-Cultural Restaurants and Food Carts". The newspaper said:

Love Vietnamese food but want to tiptoe outside of the familiar confines of bánh mì and phở? Hustle over to Hanoi Kitchen and dive into the Northeast Portland restaurant’s elaborate menu. My favorite are their bowls of vermicelli rice noodles topped with fresh vegetables, shrimp, lemongrass pork, shrimp patties on sugarcane skewers, and a light sauce with a kick of spice. More of a plate person? Try the deeply satisfying cốm hà nội ặc biệt, a dish blending sticky rice with pork, baked egg, shredded pork skins, shrimp, and fresh vegetables. The best part? Hanoi Kitchen’s servers are eager to show inexperienced diners the best way to blend and devour entrees.

Waz Wu included Hanoi Kitchen in Eater Portland's 2021 list of "Portland's Most Comforting Vegan Noodle Soups. Wu said the vegan phở is "a hit among vegans and vegetarians year-round". The website's Nick Woo and Krista Garcia included the business in a 2021 list of "Portland's Mind-Blowing Vietnamese Restaurants and Food Carts". Alex Frane and Nathan Williams included Hanoi Kitchen in a 2022 overview of recommended eateries in Montavilla, in which they described the business as "a standout Vietnamese restaurant in a town full of them".

== See also ==
- List of Vietnamese restaurants
