= List of Vietnamese restaurants =

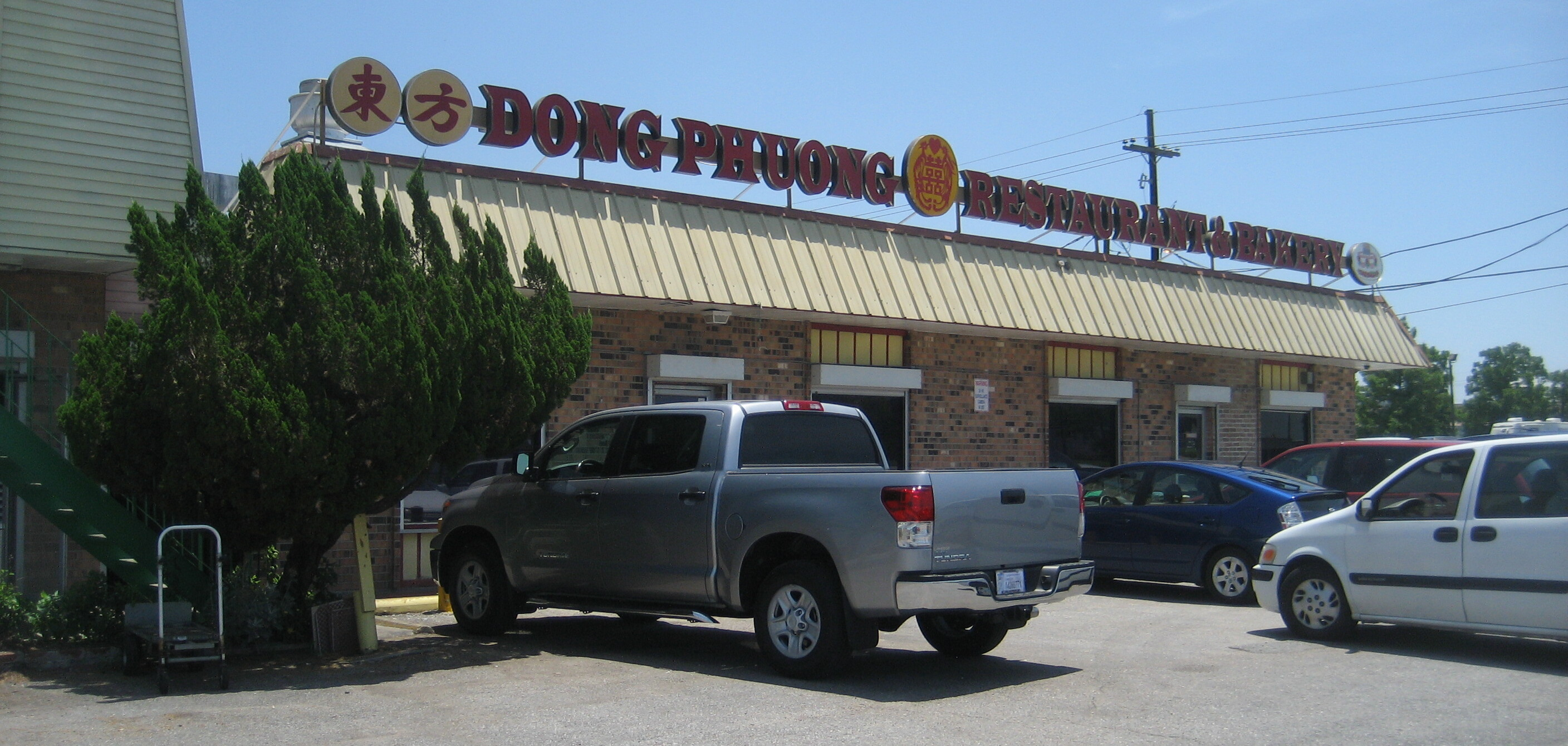
Dong Phuong Oriental Bakery, New Orleans, Louisiana, U.S.

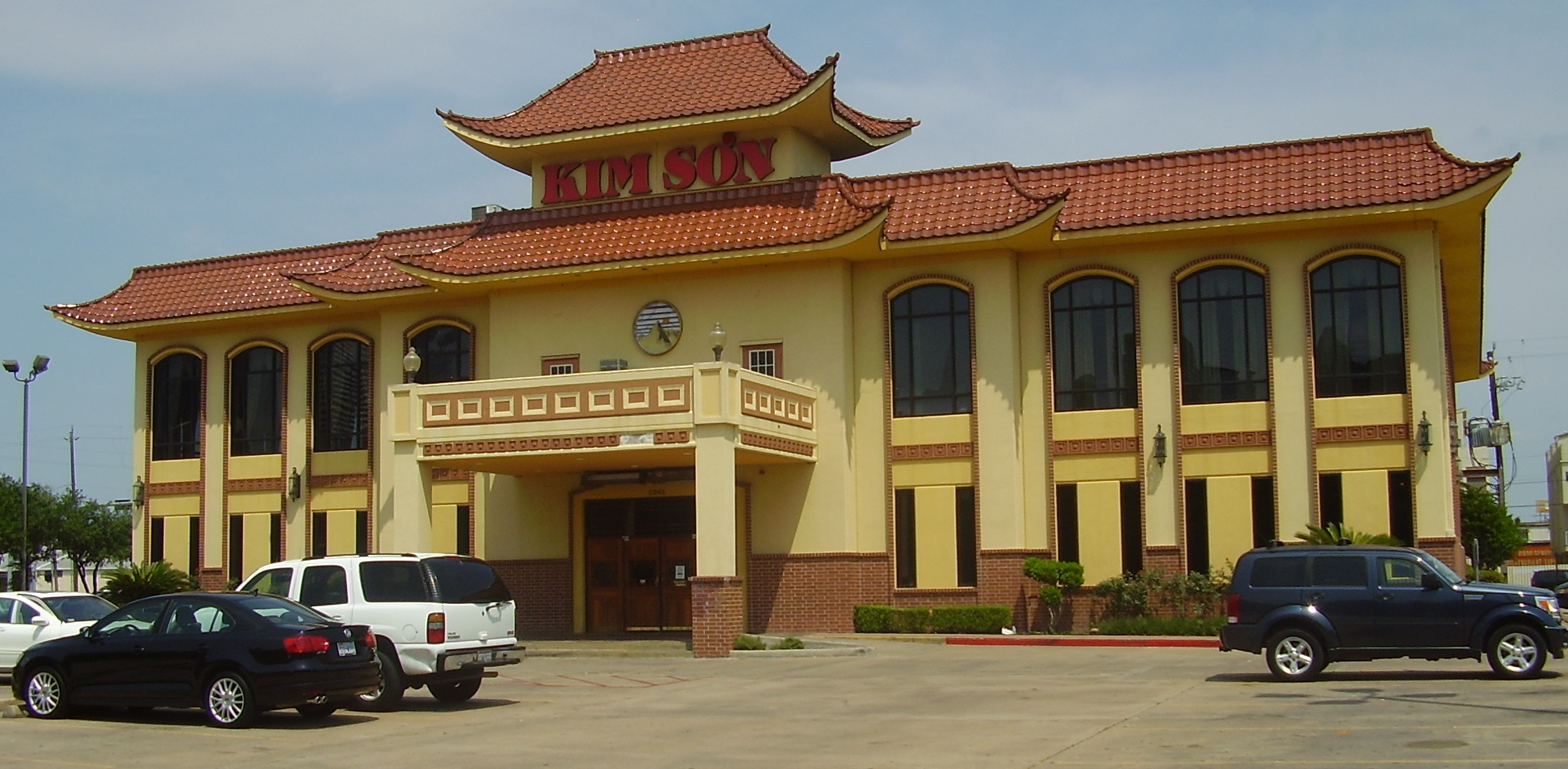
Kim Sơn, Houston, Texas

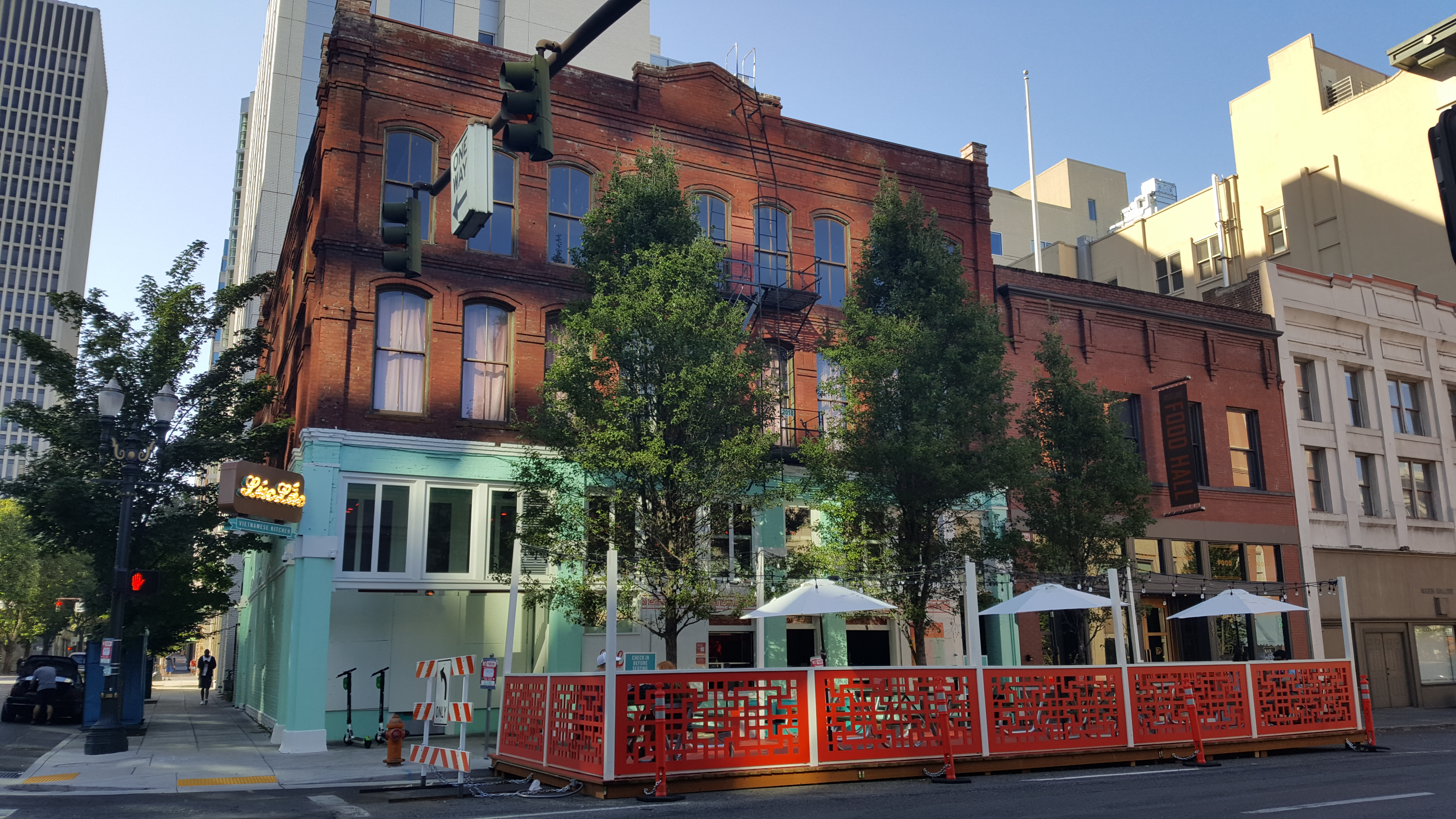
Lúc Lắc Vietnamese Kitchen, Portland, Oregon

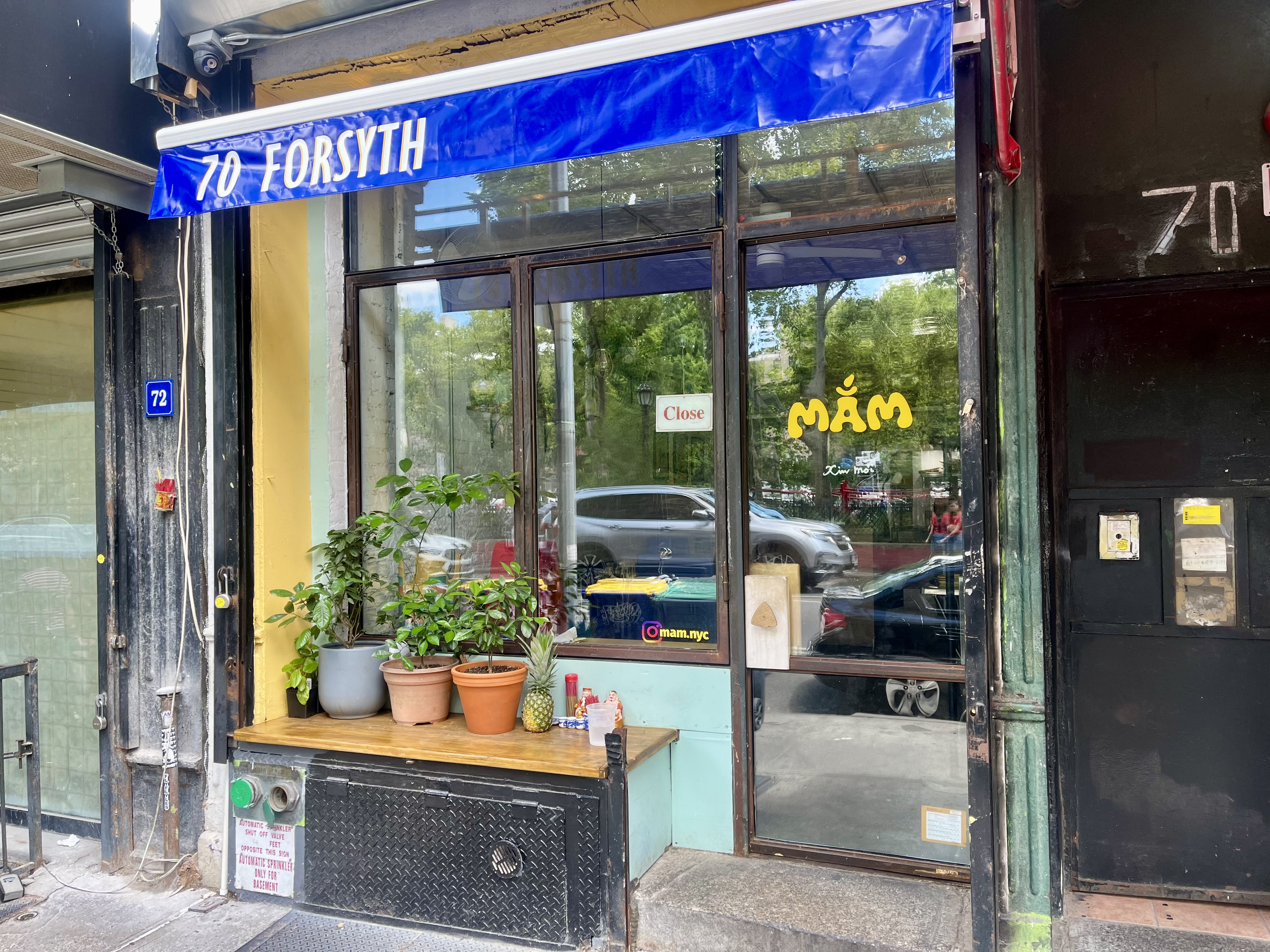
Mắm, New York City

Following is a list of Vietnamese restaurants:

- An Xuyên Bakery, Portland, Oregon, U.S.
- Anh and Chi, Vancouver, British Columbia, Canada
- Annam, Houston, Texas
- Annam VL, Portland, Oregon
- Ba Bar, Seattle, Washington, U.S.
- Bambū
- Berlu, Portland, Oregon
- Brodard, Fountain Valley, California
- Dong Phuong Oriental Bakery, New Orleans, Louisiana, U.S.
- Double Dragon, Portland, Oregon
- Fish Sauce, Portland, Oregon
- Foreign National, Seattle
- Friendship Kitchen, Portland, Oregon
- Ha VL, Portland, Oregon
- Hanoi Kitchen, Portland, Oregon
- Hello Em, Seattle
- Huong Binh Vietnamese Cuisine, Seattle
- Kim Sơn, Houston, Texas, U.S.
- Lee's Sandwiches
- Lúc Lắc Vietnamese Kitchen, Portland, Oregon
- Lunch Lady, Vancouver
- Mai's, Houston
- Mắm, New York City
- Mama Đút, Portland, Oregon
- Matta, Portland, Oregon
- Mémoire Cà Phê, Portland, Oregon
- Monsoon, Washington
- The Paper Bridge, Portland, Oregon
- Phin, Seattle
- Phnom Penh, Vancouver
- Pho, UK chain
- Pho 75
- Phở Bắc, Seattle
- Phở Gabo
- Phở Hòa
- Phở Hùng, Portland, Oregon
- Phở Kim, Portland, Oregon
- Pho Oregon, Portland, Oregon
- Pho Van
- Phởcific Standard Time, Seattle
- Rose VL Deli, Portland, Oregon
- Saigon Deli, Seattle
- Saigon Vietnam Deli, Seattle
- Sắp Sửa, Denver, Colorado, U.S.
- ShopHouse Southeast Asian Kitchen
- Stateside, Seattle
- Tamarind Tree, Seattle
- Tapalaya, Portland, Oregon
- Thanh Son Tofu and Bakery, Seattle
- Thơm Portland, Portland, Oregon

== See also ==
- List of Michelin-starred restaurants in Vietnam
