= Pho Oregon =

Vietnamese restaurant in Portland, Oregon, U.S.

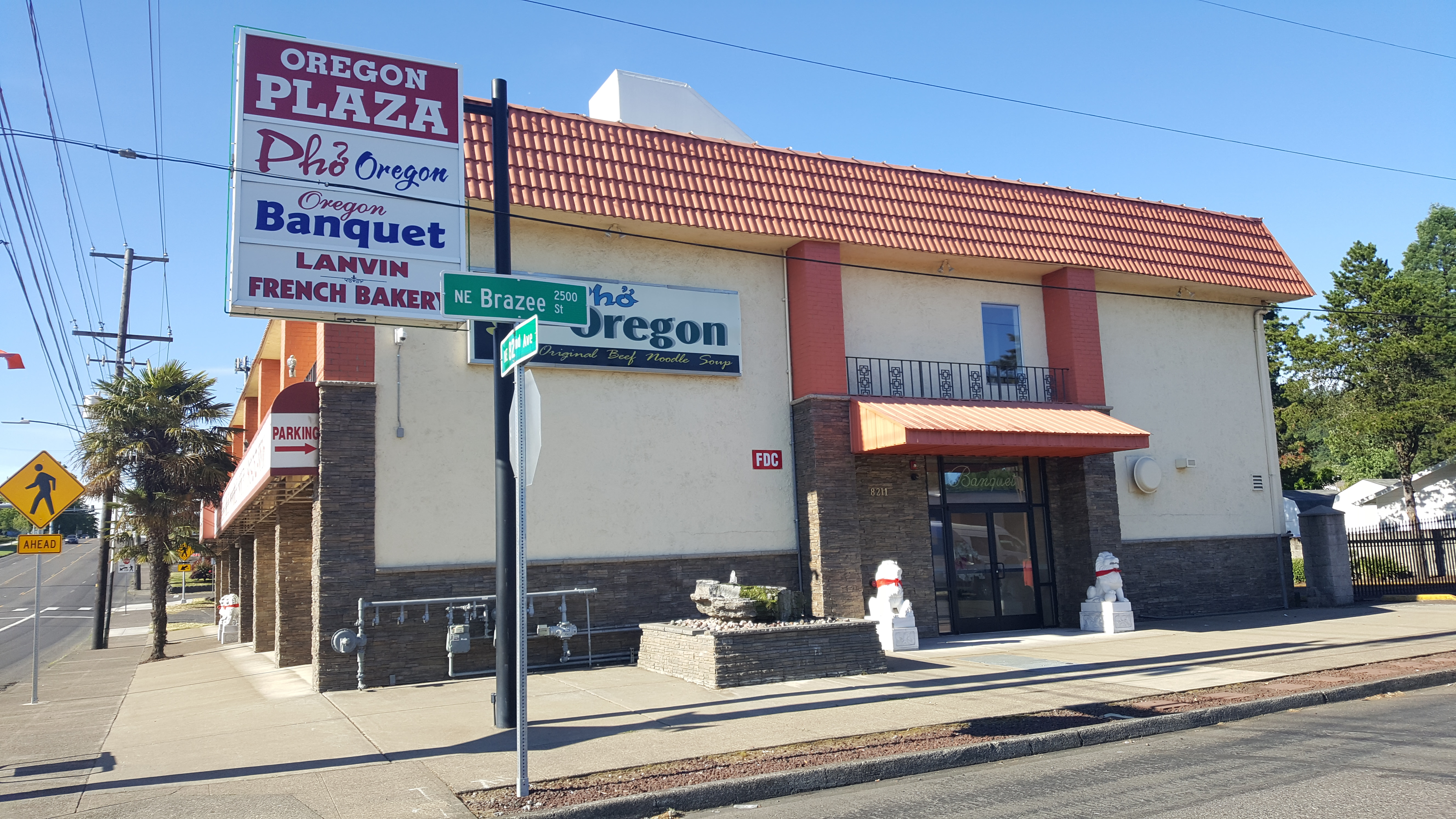
- The restaurant's exterior, 2022
- Interactive map of Pho Oregon

Restaurant information
- Established: 2003
- Food type: Vietnamese
- Location: 2518 Northeast 82nd Avenue, Portland, Multnomah, Oregon, 97220, United States
- Coordinates: 45.54035°N 122.5786°W

Pho Oregon, or Phở Oregon, is a Vietnamese restaurant in Portland, Oregon, specializing in pho.

== Description ==
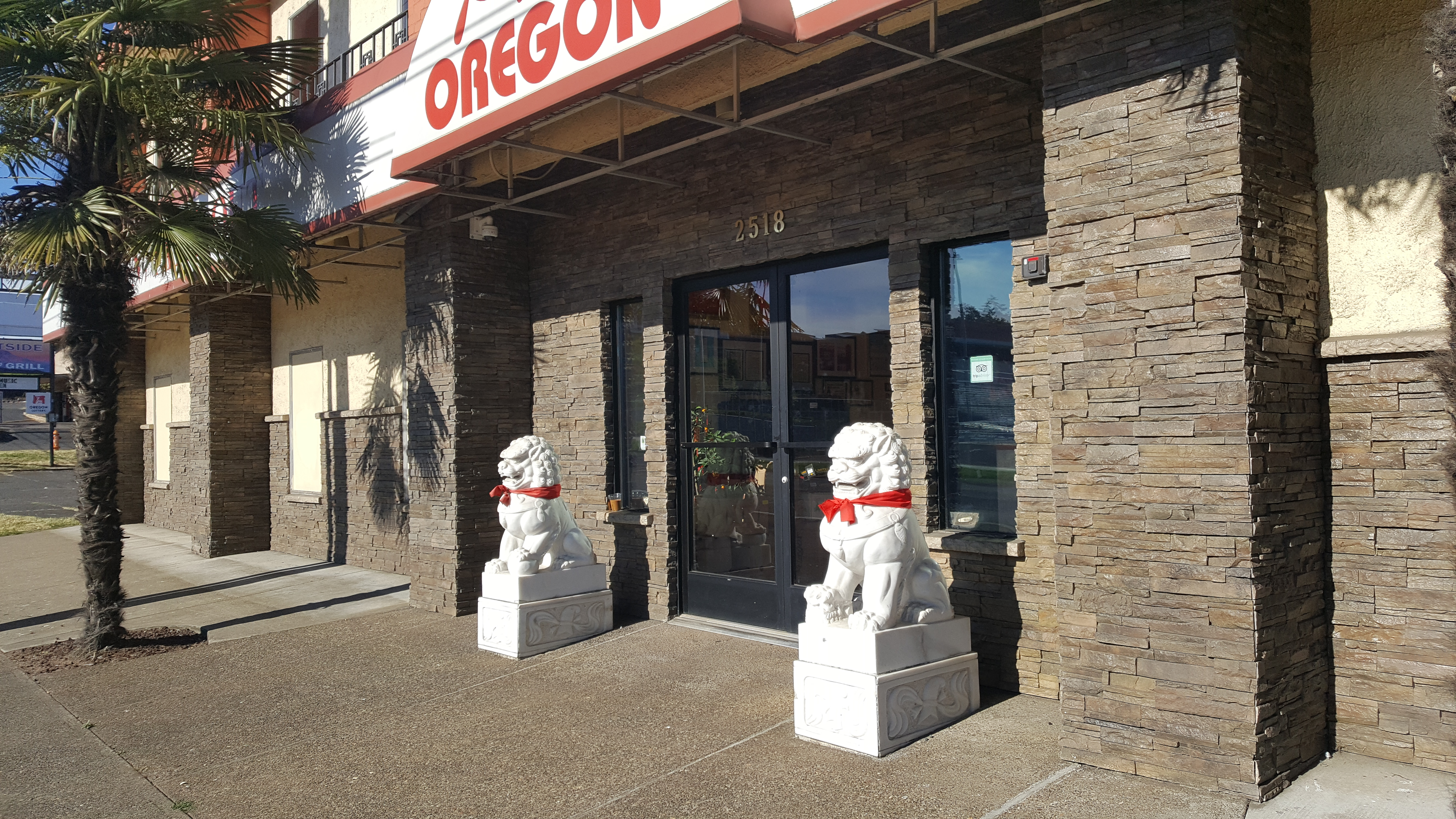
Entrance, 2022

Pho Oregon is a Vietnamese restaurant in northeast Portland's Madison South neighborhood. In 2018, Patricia Sauthoff of Willamette Week said, "Pho Oregon's huge dining room is filled with the taste of broth. The menu is also thick with traditional Vietnamese dishes, like com bo kho, a fatty, succulent beef in a broth with salt-and-pepper rice."

In 2020, Eater Portland's Krista Garcia wrote, "This banquet-ready institution is a well-oiled machine. From tai (flank steak only) to the dac biet (multiple cuts of beef, plus meatballs, tendon, and tripe), the menu has more than 20 different variations of pho to choose from. All bowls of pho, fragrant with star anise and clove, come out of the kitchen quicker than seems humanly possible."

Portland Monthly has described the restaurant's specialty, dac biet, as "a mighty bowl of the requisite rice noodles accompanied by slices of round steak, flank steak, fatty brisket, tendon, tripe, and beef meatballs". The restaurant also serves bánh mì, bún, Vietnamese coffee, chanh muối (salted lemonade), and sinh to bo (avocado smoothie).

== History ==
Pho Oregon opened in 2003. In 2021, the restaurant participated in Around the World in 82 Dishes, organized by the 82nd Avenue Business District.

== Reception ==
Portland Monthly has said the banh mi and bún "deserve a taste, but newcomers display a serious lapse in judgment by not ordering the pho at this tiny, unadorned joint". In 2017, Samantha Bakall and Michael Russell included Pho Oregon in two of The Oregonian's lists of Portland's best pho, writing, "Pho Oregon is cavernous and often packed, giving off the vibe of a big-city pho house, and it's our regular go-to on weekend mornings. We knew the pho was good, so it made sense to use it as a baseline, and it didn't disappoint, with nicely cooked noodles, well-rendered brisket and a rustic-yet-elegant broth, with a strong hint of clove and lots of caramel flavor from the beef bones."

In 2018, Willamette Week's Patricia Sauthoff recommended the com bo kho and said the restaurant's pho "is some of the best in town, long popular with the Portland foodie crowd". The #1 was included in Willamette Week's 2026 list of the city's best "cheap eats". In Eater Portland's 2021 "guide to dining in Portland", Brooke Jackson-Glidden called Pho Oregon a "true Portland institution". Nick Woo and Krista Garcia included Pho Oregon in the website's 2021 overview of "Portland's Mind-Blowing Vietnamese Restaurants and Food Carts".

== See also ==
- List of Vietnamese restaurants
