= Pho Van =

Vietnamese restaurant chain based in Portland, Oregon, U.S.

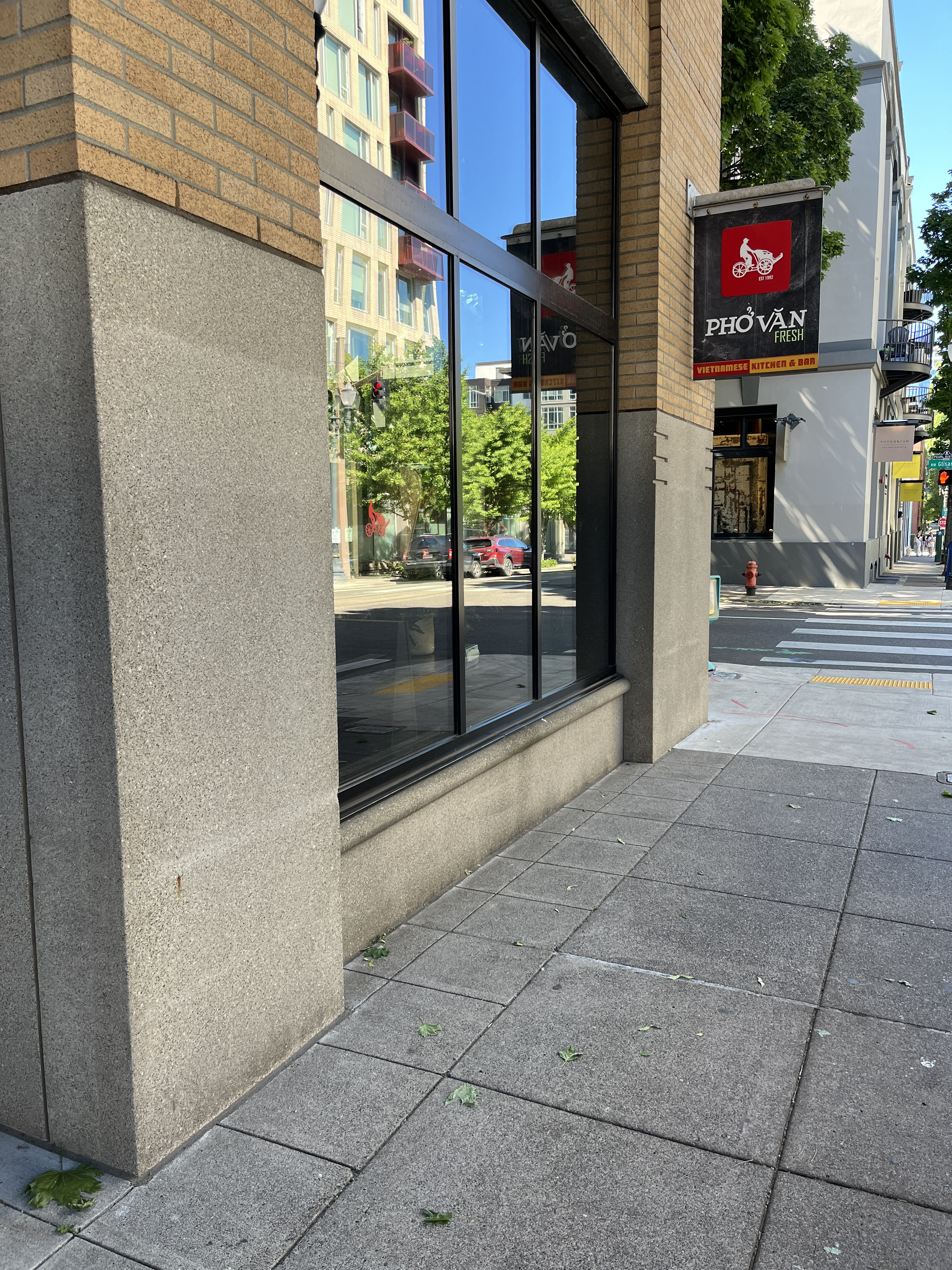
- Exterior of Pho Van Fresh, 2023
- Interactive map of Pho Van

Restaurant information
- Established: December 1, 1992
- Owner: Lam Van
- Food type: Vietnamese
- Location: 1919 SE 82nd Ave, Portland, Multnomah, Oregon, 97216, U.S.
- Coordinates: 45.5262°N 122.6811°W
- Other locations: 11651 SW Beaverton Hillsdale Hwy, Beaverton, Oregon, 97005, U.S.
- Website: phovanrestaurant.com

Pho Van is a Vietnamese restaurant chain based in Portland, Oregon, United States. The original restaurant opened in southeast Portland in 1992. Owner Lam Van opened a second, called Silk by Pho Van, in northwest Portland's Pearl District in 2002. Third and fourth locations opened in Beaverton and on southeast Portland's Hawthorne Boulevard in 2003 and 2006, respectively. The business expanded to China in 2012. Silk rebranded as Pho Van Fresh in 2015.

== Description ==
The menu has included roasted catfish, papaya salad with shrimp, crispy rolls, and bánh xèo (stuffed pancakes).

== History ==
Owner Lam Van opened the original restaurant on 82nd Avenue, in the southeast Portland part of the Montavilla neighborhood, in 1992. Silk by Pho Van, or simply Silk, opened in northwest Portland's Pearl District in 2002. A third opened in Beaverton in 2003, and a fourth opened on Hawthorne Boulevard in southeast Portland in 2006. A location opened in Beijing in 2012.

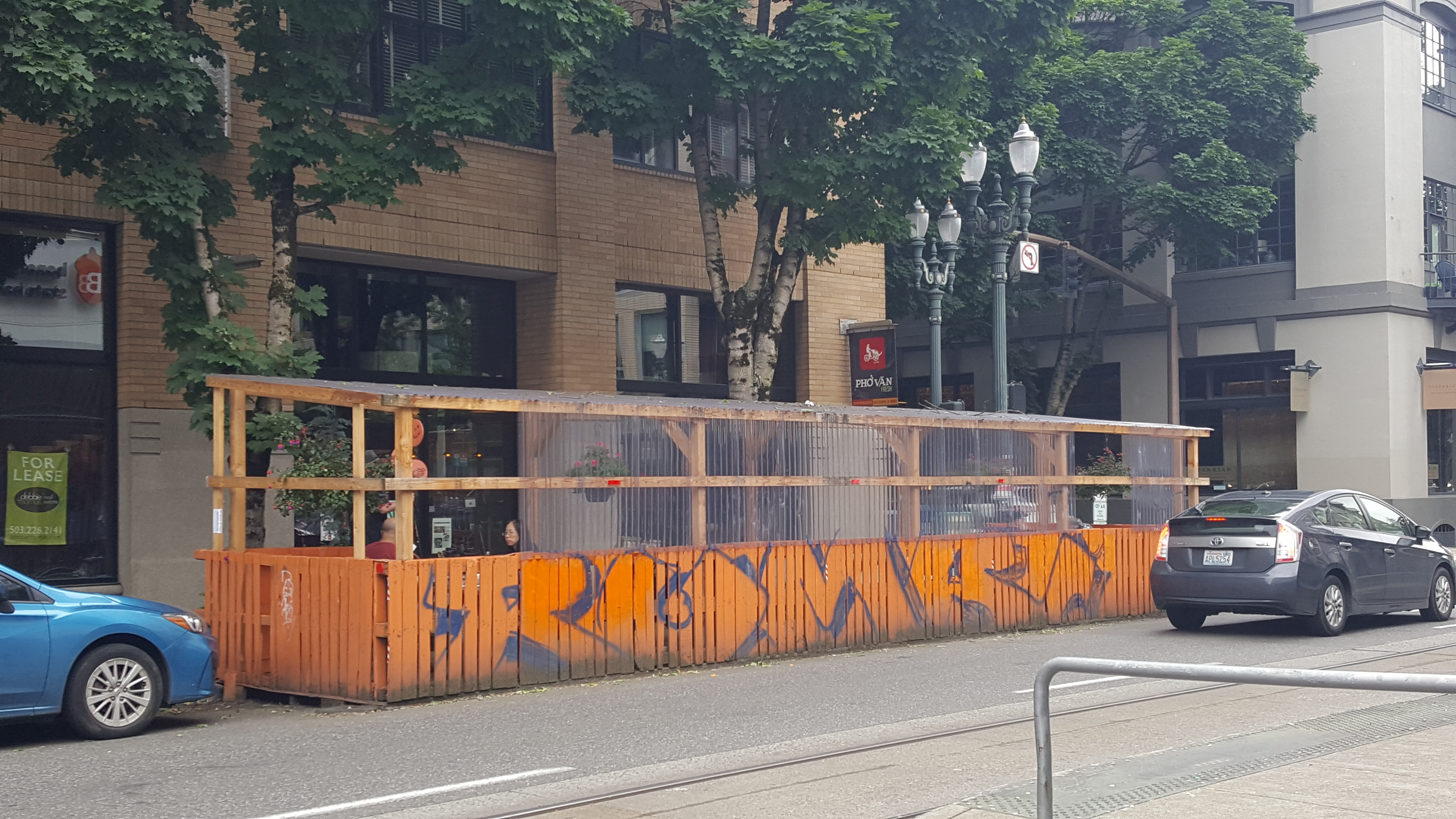
Outdoor seating at Pho Van Fresh, 2022

The Hawthorne Boulevard location closed in 2013. Van elected to close the restaurant when the lease expired and focus on expansion in China. In 2015, the "upscale spinoff" Silk was remodeled and rebranded as Pho Van Fresh, a "fast-casual version" of the original and Beaverton restaurants.

== Reception ==
In The Oregonian's 2017 overview of Portland's best pho, Michael Russell wrote, "The 82nd Avenue location has a quiet, teahouse vibe livened up by skylights, orchids and a pair of ornate dancing dragons near the front door. Probably Portland's most serene spot to enjoy a bowl of pho." Samantha Bakall included the restaurant in the newspaper's 2017 list of "Portland's 5 best bowls of pho". After receiving honorable mention in 2015, Pho Van won in the Best Pho category of Willamette Week's annual Best of Portland readers' poll in 2016. The restaurant ranked second in the Best Vietnamese Restaurant category in 2020 and 2022.

== See also ==
- List of Vietnamese restaurants
