= Thơm Portland =

Vietnamese restaurant in Portland, Oregon, U.S.

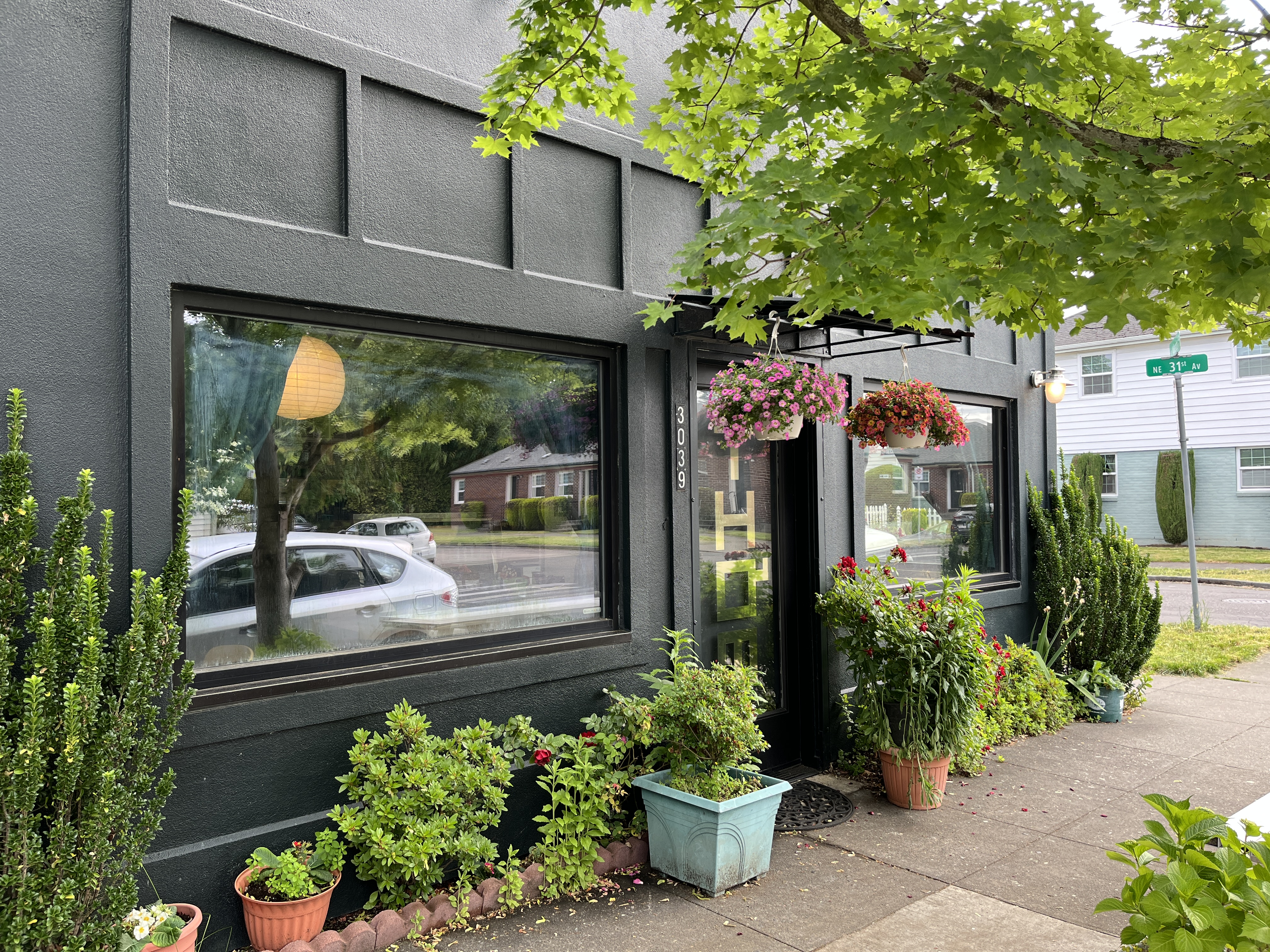
- The restaurant's exterior, 2025
- Interactive map of Thơm Portland

Restaurant information
- Established: August 2021
- Food type: Vietnamese
- Location: 3039 Northeast Alberta Street, Portland, Multnomah, Oregon, 97211, United States
- Coordinates: 45.5592°N 122.6340°W
- Seating capacity: 10
- Website: thom.love

Thơm Portland, or simply Thơm, is a Vietnamese restaurant in Portland, Oregon, United States.

== Description ==
Thơm (which means "smells good") is a Vietnamese restaurant in northeast Portland's Concordia neighborhood, specializing in pho. Portland Monthly's Karen Brooks has described the restaurant, which has a seating capacity of 10, as "tiny" and "casual". She wrote, "The feel is of stepping into a hidden studio in a mid-century home—blonde wood everywhere, painterly shades of green, a trio of hanging Isamu Noguchi Akari light sculptures, and customized wood speakers, four of them, strategically placed around the room." The menu has included Phở Bo (beef noodle), Phở Chay (vegan phở), Bún Thịt Nướng (barbecue pork noodles), and Cơm Gà (chicken and rice), vermicelli, and rice plates.

== History ==
Brothers Jimmy and Johnny Le opened Thơm in August 2021, in a space which previously housed The Big Egg and Sugar Cube.

== Reception ==
In 2021, Michael Russell of The Oregonian called Thơm the "second-wave Vietnamese restaurant Portland has been waiting for". He included Thơm in a list of Portland's best new restaurants and the bún thịt nướng in an overview of the year's "most memorable" dishes, writing:

The phở is great. So is the five-spice chicken and rice. But my favorite thing to eat at chef Jimmy Le's new four-dish Northeast Portland restaurant is the bún thịt nướng, a bowl of 'dad’s grilled pork' served over slick rice noodles with pickles and nước chấm. Yes, you’ve had this dish before — you can get it at the airport! — just never with pork this sweet and juicy.

Karen Brooks included Thơm in Portland Monthly's Best Restaurants list. Brooke Jackson-Glidden included the restaurant in Eater Portland's 2022 overview of recommended eateries on Alberta.

== See also ==
- List of Vietnamese restaurants
