= Expatriate (restaurant) =

Restaurant and cocktail bar in Portland, Oregon, U.S.

- Interactive map of Expatriate

Restaurant information
- Established: 2013
- Closed: February 2026
- Location: 5424 Northeast 30th Avenue, Portland, Oregon, 97211, United States
- Coordinates: 45.5624°N 122.6346°W
- Website: expatriatepdx.com

Expatriate was a restaurant and cocktail bar in northeast Portland, Oregon's Concordia neighborhood, in the United States. Naomi Pomeroy and Kyle Linden Webster opened the restaurant in 2013. It closed permanently in February 2026.

== Description ==
Thrillist said, "Arguably one of Portland's most popular cocktail bars, the bartenders at Expatriate are professionally trained mixologists who, in addition to perfecting the classics, have a knack for creating custom or experimental drinks. And in addition to these carefully-crafted concoctions, the bar also offers a menu of refined bar bites. The Prohibition-era vibe is evident from the gold and red decor that is way more sexy than kitschy."

Food options included corn dogs, a Burmese coconut noodle bowl with wheat noodles, coconut sauce, cilantro roast chicken, duck confit and a gooey half-egg, and Brussels sprouts with Napa cabbage, Szechuan pepper vinaigrette, caramelized squash, and ground lamb.

== History ==
The restaurant opened in 2013. It launched brunch service in 2016.

Expatriate closed permanently in February 2026. The Filipino restaurant Pamana is slated to operate in the space.

== Reception ==
Willamette Week included Expatriate in a 2014 list of Portland's top 100 restaurants. The restaurant was a runner-up in the Best Cocktail category of the newspaper's annual 'Best of Portland' readers' poll in 2017. Brooke Jackson-Glidden included Expatriate's nachos in Eater Portland's 2024 overview of "iconic" Portland dishes. Alex Frane included the business in Portland Monthly's 2025 list of the city's best bars. Writers for Portland Monthly included the wonton nachos in a 2025 list of the city's "most iconic" dishes.

== See also ==
- List of defunct restaurants of the United States
