= Mắm (restaurant) =

Vietnamese restaurant in New York City, U.S.

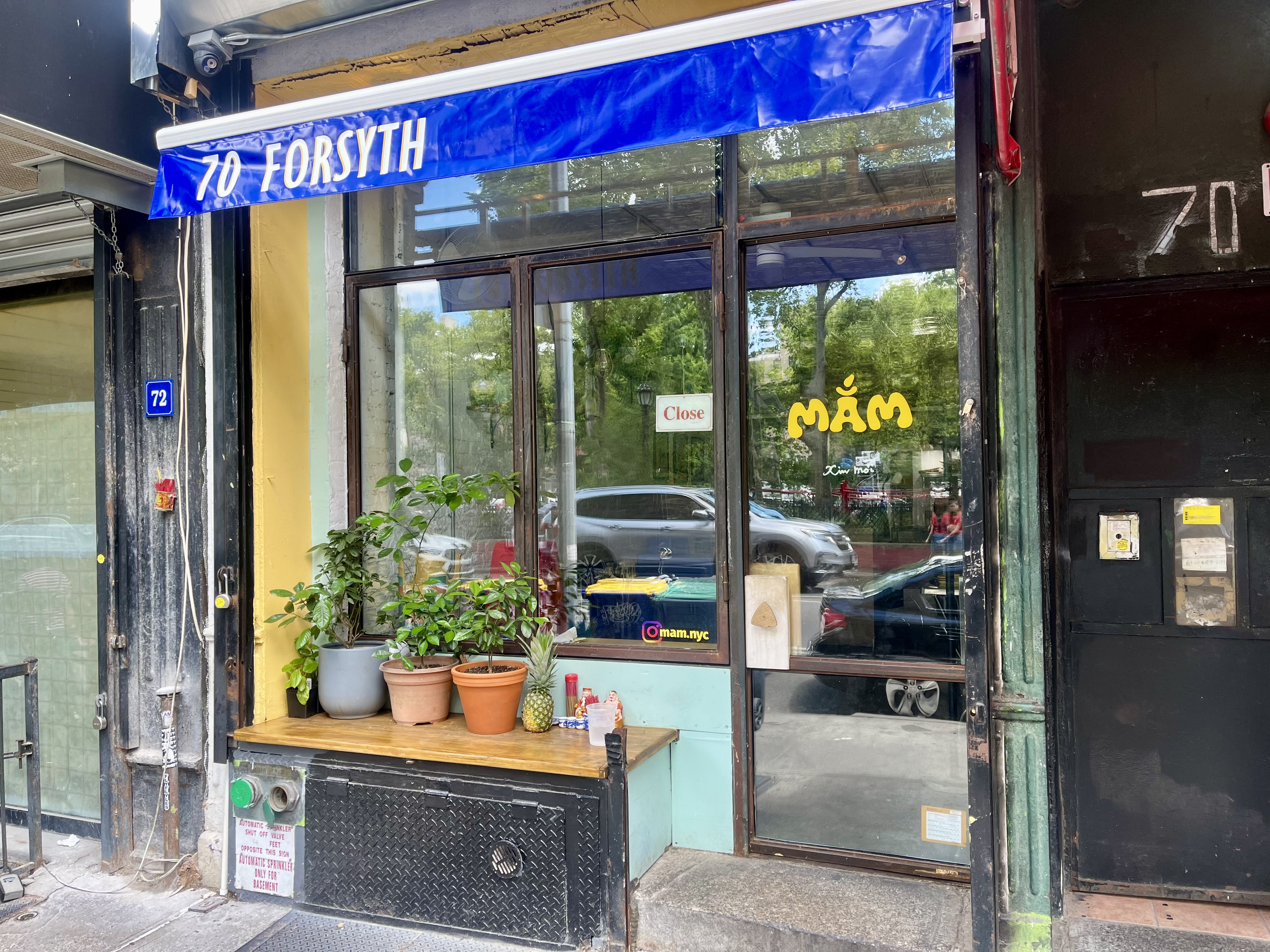
- The restaurant's exterior in 2024
- Interactive map of Mắm

Restaurant information
- Established: May 2022
- Owners: Jerald Head; Nhung Dao Head
- Head chef: Jerald Head
- Food type: Vietnamese
- Location: 70 Forsyth Street, Manhattan, New York City, New York, 10002, United States
- Coordinates: 40°43′01″N 73°59′36″W
- Website: instagram.com/mam.nyc

Mắm is a Vietnamese restaurant on the Lower East Side of Manhattan in New York City specializing in food from Central Vietnam. Starting as a pop-up, the restaurant opened a brick and mortar shop in 2022. The restaurant is named after Mắm nêm or fermented shrimp paste sauce and their signature dish is Bún Đậu Mắm Tôm; a melange of food to be dipped in said sauce including house made tofu, pork belly, and sticky rice sausage. The restaurant was listed as 20th on the New York Times list of best restaurants in 2024 going up 6 places from 2023

== History ==
Through the 2010s, chef Jerald Head became obsessed with Vietnamese food and went on a three-month trip to Vietnam in 2016. There, right by his hostel, he met his wife, Nhung Dao, with whom he later co-founded Mắm. They married in 2018.

Mắm first opened for six weeks in 2020, after which it went on a hiatus for over a year while Dao had a baby. It then reopened in 2022 with a frequently changing menu. In December 2023, it established a permanent brick-and-mortar location, with an expansion, on Forysth Street in the Bowery neighborhood.

In November 2025, Mắm had a one-night pop-up at Cork in collaboration with the Tiger Palm Club.

== Critical reception ==
Pete Wells of The New York Times gave Mắm two out of four stars, and it was labeled as a Critic's Pick. It was ranked twentieth in the Times' best restaurants in New York City in 2024. Time Out called it "Perfect for adventurous foodies who want a taste of authentic Vietnam in a fun setting" and crowned it the best pho in New York City. Vietnam News gave it three out of five stars, stating that "isn’t street food, and it isn’t cheap, but it’s the closest I’ve come to tasting home in New York City" and lauded its authenticity. The Infatuation gave it 9.4 out of 10, recommending the nấm cuốn and gỏi nghêu, among some other dishes.

== See also ==
- List of Vietnamese restaurants
