= Ethnic groups in Portland, Oregon =

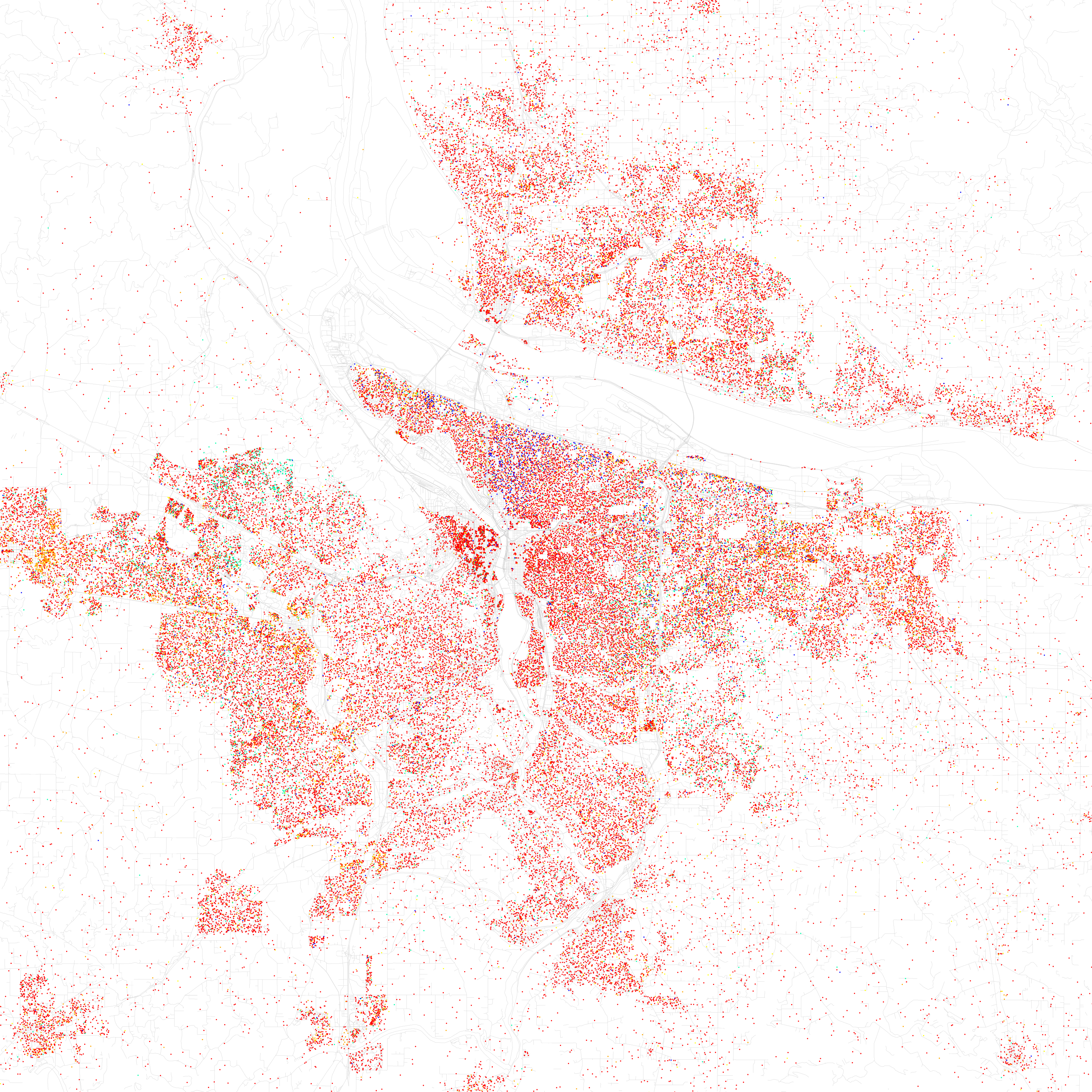
Map of racial distribution in Portland, Oregon, according to the 2010 U.S. Census. Each dot represents 25 people, according to the following color code: ⬤ White ⬤ Black ⬤ Asian ⬤ Hispanic ⬤ Other

According to the City of Portland, "In all categories, the Eastside is more racially diverse than the Westside. Hispanics are most concentrated in North Portland at nearly 15% of the population. NE Portland has the highest concentration of African Americans at 30%. The concentration of Asians in Portland are mostly within NE, SE, and outer East Portland, with a percent population of 11%, 10%, and 9% respectively. Whites are the most common race group citywide."

In 2016, Alana Semuels of The Atlantic wrote, "As black people moved into Albina, whites moved out; by the end of the 1950s, there were 23,000 fewer white residents and 7,000 more black residents than there had been at the beginning of the decade." She also said "by 1999, blacks owned 36 percent fewer homes than they had a decade earlier, while whites owned 43 percent more." In 2021, the Southeast Examiner's Don MacGillivray said "Portland is known for its lack of racial diversity and its lack of African Americans", with a Black population at six percent and Latinos at 10 percent of the city's population.

Racial composition as of the 2020 census
Race	Number	Percent
White	449,025	68.8%
Black or African American	38,217	5.9%
American Indian and Alaska Native	7,335	1.1%
Asian	52,854	8.1%
Native Hawaiian and Other Pacific Islander	3,919	0.6%
Some other race	31,255	4.8%
Two or more races	69,898	10.7%
Hispanic or Latino (of any race)	72,336	11.1%

== African Americans ==
African Americans are concentrated in north and northeast Portland. The Albina neighborhood in northeast Portland was historically African American, and was home to over 80% of the Black population of the city in the 1960s. In the following decades, many of these residents were forced to move out of Albina and many Black-owned businesses were destroyed by urban renewal projects and eminent domain.

The Skanner was an African American community newspaper in Portland. Notable Black-owned restaurants and cafés in the city include Akadi, Beastro, Assembly Brewing, Amalfi’s Italian Restaurant, Atlas Pizza, Baes Fried Chicken, Deadstock Coffee, Dirty Lettuce, Everybody Eats PDX, Erica's Soul Food, Grits n' Gravy, Kee's Loaded Kitchen, Meals 4 Heels, and Viking Soul Food.

== Asians ==
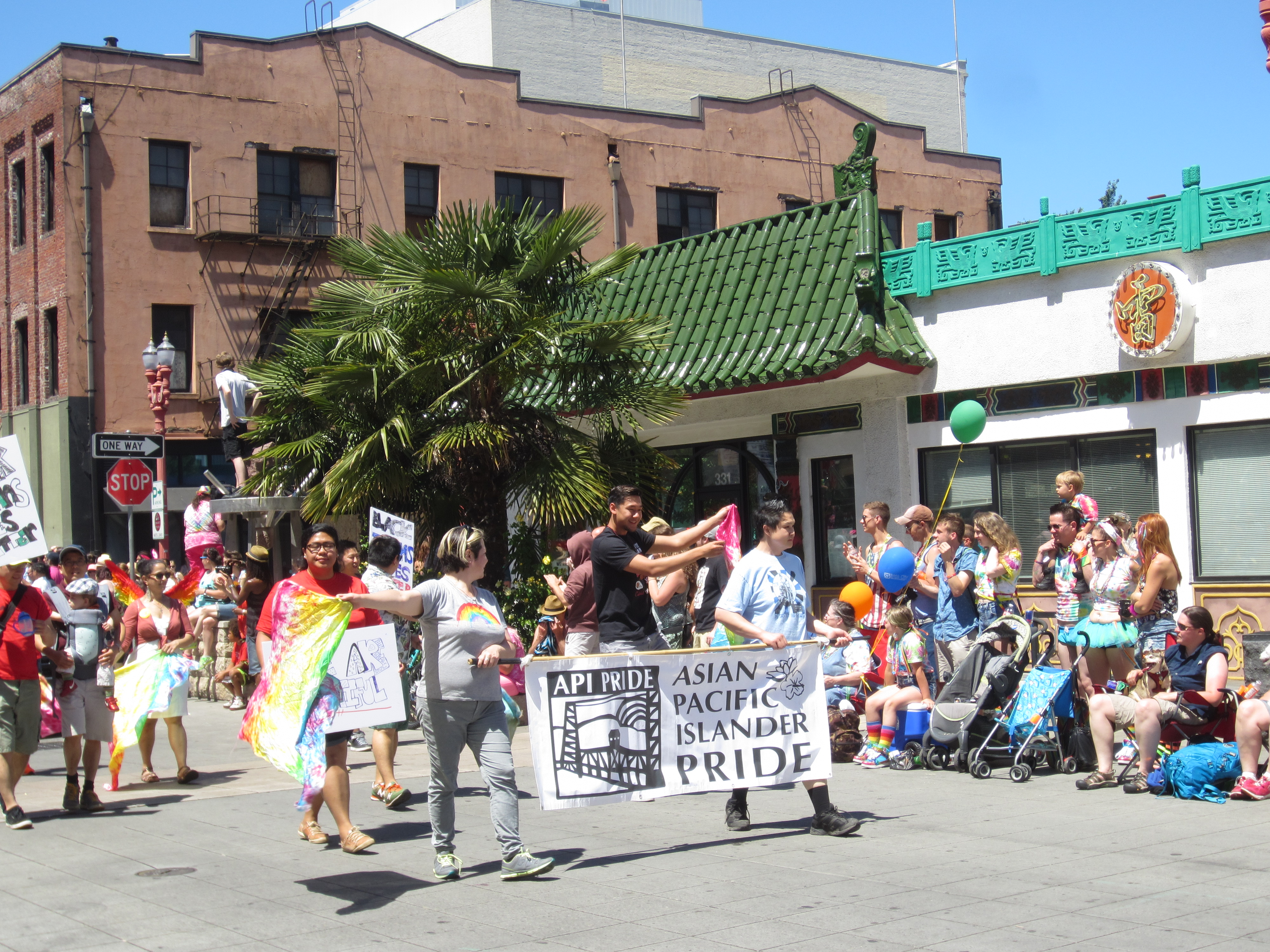
Asia Pacific Islander Pride group in Portland's pride parade, 2015

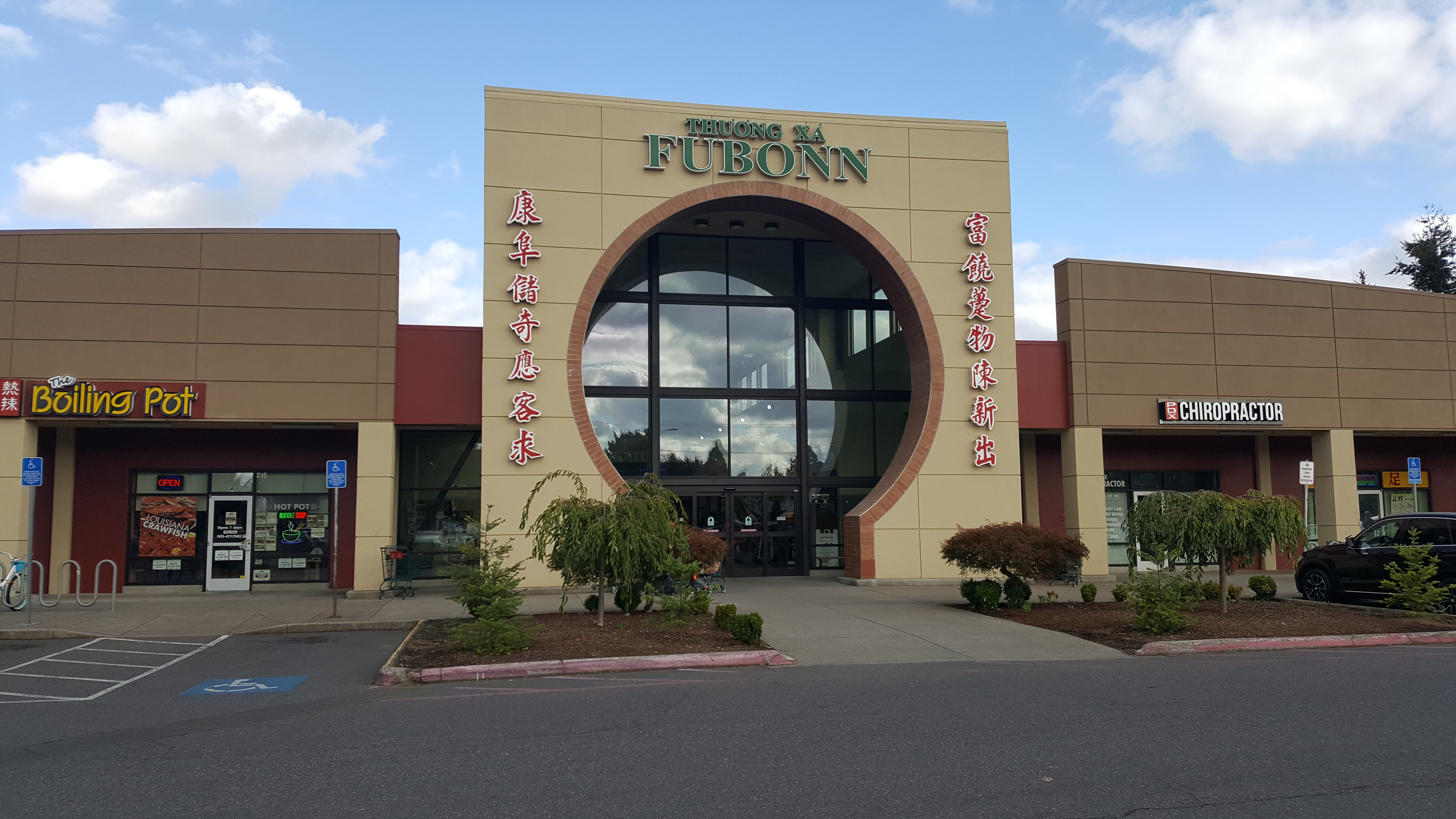
Fubonn Shopping Center, southeast Portland, 2018

=== Burmese ===
As of 2010, approximately 1,400 Burmese people lived in the Portland metropolitan area.

Notable Burmese restaurants have included Rangoon Bistro and Top Burmese.

=== Chinese ===
According to The Oregonian, "One in 10 residents in Portland were Chinese by 1890, making Portland’s Chinese community the second largest in the United States at that time." Ladd's Addition was among the city's first neighborhoods in which Chinese people were allowed to own homes.

=== Filipino ===
The Filipino Bayanihan Center opened in Southeast Portland in 2021.

Sobrang Sarap is a food tour of Filipino cuisine. Notable Filipino restaurants have included Baon Kainan, Botanical Bakeshop, Magna Kusina, and Sun Rice.

=== Indian ===
From 1994 to 2003, the India Cultural Association held its annual Celebration of India Festival (or simply India Festival) in Portland's Pioneer Courthouse Square. The event was held in Beaverton in 2024. The Bengali Association of Greater Portland (also known as Prabashi Portland) hosts the annual Durga Puja.

Notable Indian restaurants have included:

- Bhuna
- Bollywood Theater
- Bombay Cricket Club
- Desi PDX
- East India Co. Grill and Bar
- Kulfi
- Maruti Indian Restaurant
- Masala Lab PDX
- The Sudra

=== Japanese ===
Ethnic Japanese in the present-day Portland area are known to date back as far as 1834, though permanent Japanese residents did not appear until the 1880s. The Japanese community grew over the next several decades, and eventually, two Japantowns had been established in the city of Portland. Both of these ethnic enclaves disappeared during World War II's Internment of Japanese Americans. Following World War II, a number of the interned Japanese Americans returned to the Portland area. As of 2010, approximately 30,000 Japanese-Americans resided in Portland, Oregon with a total of 38,000 residing in the greater Multnomah County area.

=== Palestinian ===
According to 2019 census data, approximately 400 Portland residents listed Palestinian as their ancestry.

=== Thai ===
The Portland Thai Festival is held annually. Notable Thai restaurants have included:

- E-san Thai Cuisine
- Eem
- Hat Yai
- Khao Moo Dang
- Langbaan
- Nong's Khao Man Gai
- Nudi Noodle Place
- OK Chicken and Khao Soi
- PaaDee
- Phuket Cafe
- Pok Pok
- Rukdiew Cafe
- Thai Peacock
- Whiskey Soda Lounge
- Yaowarat

=== Vietnamese ===
Portland had the fifteenth largest Vietnamese population in the United States, as of 2022. Vietnamese coffee gained popularity in Portland in the 2020s. Notable Vietnamese restaurants have included:

- An Xuyên Bakery
- Annam VL
- Berlu
- Double Dragon
- Fish Sauce
- Ha VL
- Hanoi Kitchen
- Lúc Lắc Vietnamese Kitchen
- Mama Đút
- Matta
- Phở Gabo
- Phở Kim
- Pho Oregon
- Pho Van
- Portland Cà Phê
- Rose VL Deli
- Tapalaya
- Thơm Portland

== Jews ==
Approximately 75,500 Jews live in the Portland metropolitan area.

== Native Americans ==
Portland has the ninth largest urban Native American population in the United States. In 2025, The Oregonian said that "less than 2% of the population identifies as Native American" in Portland. Javelina serves Indigenous cuisine.

== Romani ==
Portland has a substantial Romani population. Approximately 3,000 Romani people live in the metropolitan area.

== See also ==
- Culture of Portland, Oregon
- Gentrification of Portland, Oregon
- Good in the Hood, a multicultural festival in Portland
- Racism in Oregon
