= Mémoire Cà Phê =

Restaurant in Portland, Oregon, U.S.

Coordinates: 45.5592°N 122.6345°W

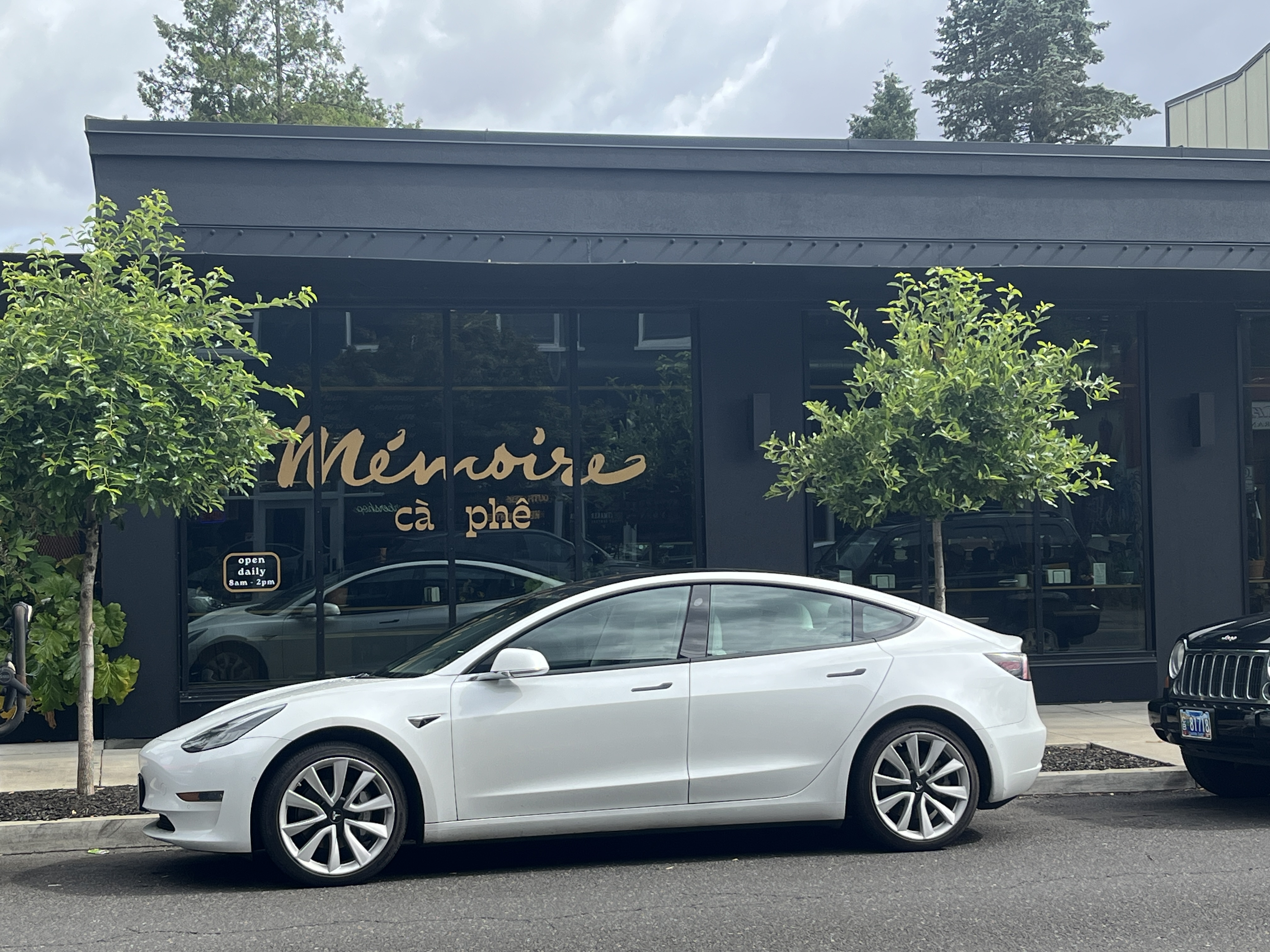
- The restaurant's exterior, 2026
- Interactive map of Mémoire Cà Phê

Restaurant information
- Established: August 24, 2024
- Owners: Kimberly Dam; Richard Le; Lisa Nguyen
- Food type: Vietnamese American
- Location: 3003 Northeast Alberta Street, Portland, Multnomah, Oregon, 97211, United States
- Website: memoire-ca-phe.square.site

Mémoire Cà Phê is a Vietnamese American restaurant in Portland, Oregon, United States. Established in 2024, the business is owned by chef Richard Le of Matta, coffee roaster Kimberly Dam of Portland Cà Phê, and pastry chef Lisa Nguyen of the doughnut shop HeyDay. Mémoire Cà Phê was included in Eater's list of the nation's fourteen best new restaurants in 2024.

== Description ==
The counter service restaurant Mémoire Cà Phê operates near the intersection of Alberta Street and 30th Avenue in northeast Portland's Concordia neighborhood. Previously, the business operated on Alberta Street at 15th Avenue in the Vernon neighborhood.

Mémoire Cà Phê serves Vietnamese American cuisine, inspired by the owners' shared heritage. The menu includes a version of McDonald's Big Breakfast with a pandan waffle instead of a biscuit. One breakfast sandwich has milk bread, pork, fried egg, American cheese, and nước chấm. The cafe also has breakfast burritos with pork belly caramelized with fish sauce, chicken and waffles, a shrimp omelette with garlic and shallots, desserts and pastries such as affogato and a cinnamon roll with black sesame and marionberry jam, and coffee drinks.

== History ==
Mémoire Cà Phê is owned by chef Richard Le of the Vietnamese restaurant Matta, coffee roaster Kimberly Dam of Portland Cà Phê, and pastry chef Lisa Nguyen of the doughnut shop HeyDay. In January 2024, Brooke Jackson-Glidden of Eater Portland described the trio's plans to open Mémoire Cà Phê in the spring. In March, she and Janey Wong said the restaurant was slated to open in June. Mémoire Cà Phê opened on August 24, 2024.

Mémoire Cà Phê relocated to a larger space along Alberta in 2026.

== Reception ==
Mémoire Cà Phê was included in Eater's list of the fourteen best new restaurants in the U.S. in 2024. Additionally, Jackson-Glidden and Rebecca Roland included the business in Eater Portland's 2024 overview of the city's "best next-level" brunch restaurants. The website also included Mémoire Cà Phê in a list of the "hottest" new eateries in Portland for November 2024, and the owners won in the Restaurant Team of the Year category of the website's annual Eater Awards. Writing for Portland Monthly in 2024, Jackson-Glidden said, "dishes at Mémoire feel original and imaginative while remaining firmly attached to their tender roots". The business was included in Eater Portland's 2025 list of Portland's best brunch restaurants. The Oregonian included Mémoire Cà Phê in an overview of Portland's best new brunches of 2025.

== See also ==
- List of Vietnamese restaurants
