= Batterfish =

Defunct restaurant in Portland, Oregon, U.S.

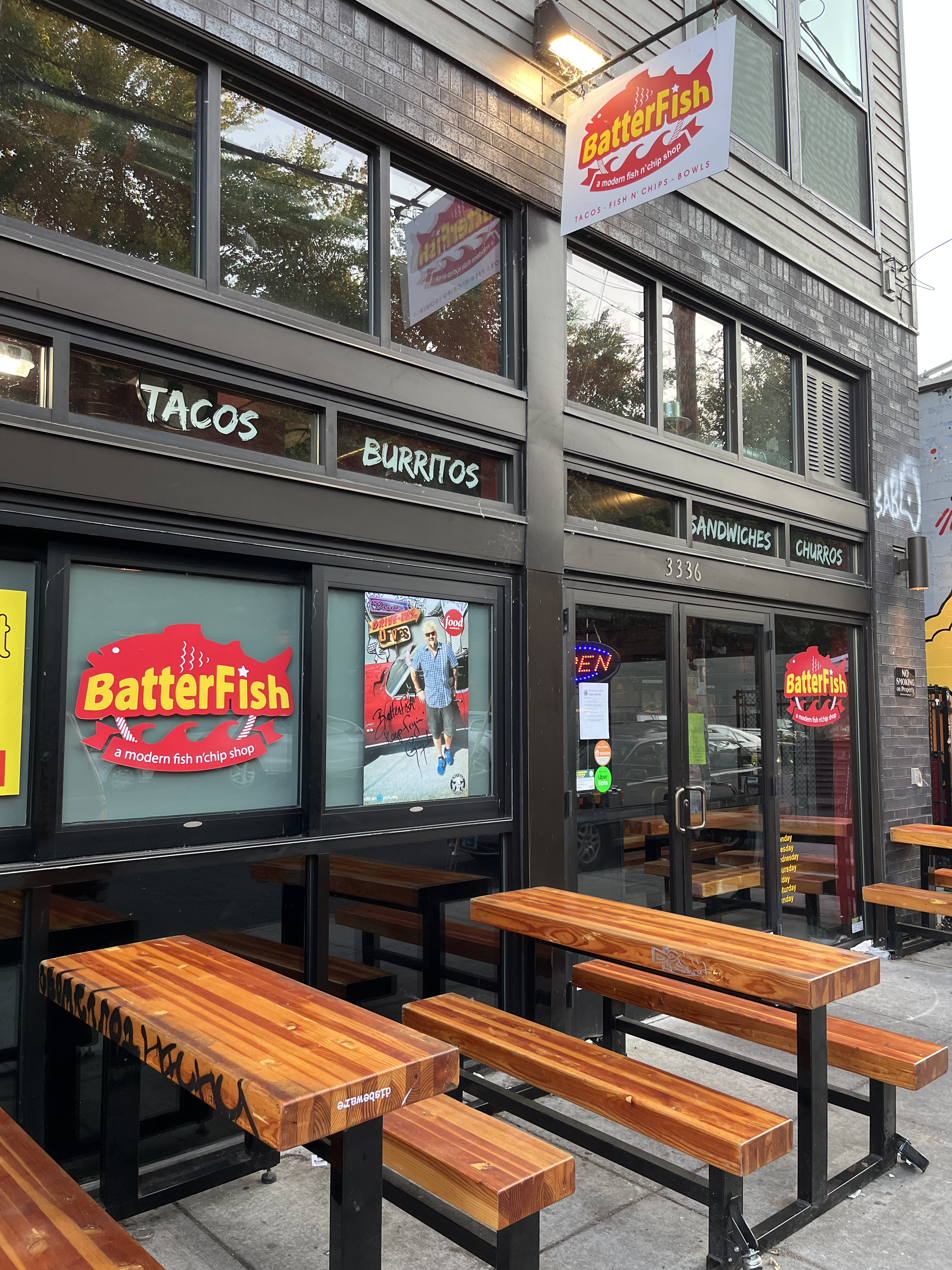
- Exterior of the restaurant in Portland, Oregon, 2022
- Interactive map of Batterfish

Restaurant information
- Owner: Jason Killalee
- Food type: Seafood
- Location: 3336 Southeast Belmont Street, Portland, Multnomah, Oregon, 97214, United States
- Coordinates: 45.5163°N 122.6301°W
- Website: batterfish.com

Batterfish was a fish and chip shop in Portland, Oregon. Previously, the business operated in Encino, Los Angeles, as a food truck in Santa Monica, California, and as a food cart in Happy Valley, Oregon. Batterfish specialized in fish and chips and was featured on the Food Network's Diners, Drive-Ins and Dives. The restaurant closed by 2023.

== Description ==
Batterfish was described as a fish and chip shop on Belmont Street in southeast Portland. The business served catfish, cod, salmon, and tilapia, with chili, curry, garlic ginger, lemon basil, and traditional batter options. Sides included fries, onion rings, and peas. Over time, the menu expanded to include burgers, burritos, and sandwiches. Batterfish also served fish tacos and burritos to commemorate a restaurant which had previously operated in the Portland space, as well as vegan options.

== History ==
The restaurant opened in Encino, Los Angeles, in 2014, and operated there until June 2016, when owner Jason Killalee announced plans to operate Batterfish as a food truck in Santa Monica, California, starting on July 15. In 2017, Batterfish was featured on the Food Network's Diners, Drive-Ins and Dives (season 27, episode 3).

In 2020, Batterfish began operating from a food cart at the Happy Valley Station pod in Happy Valley, Oregon. The business relocated and became a brick and mortar restaurant in southeast Portland's Sunnyside neighborhood in 2022, operating in a space which previously housed Char Latin Grill. The restaurant closed by 2023, and the restaurant Annam VL moved into the space.

== Reception ==
In 2015, Lucas Peterson of Eater Los Angeles said Batterfish served the best fish and chips in Los Angeles. Guy Fieri said of the restaurant, "If you can a make a living off a fish and chips truck in a town like Los Angeles, you must be doing it right." Thrillist described Batterfish as an "Encino wonderland" and a "British pub-inspired spot with unique fish and chip options". The site recommended the curry cod with sweet potato fries. Jamie Hale included Batterfish in The Oregonian's 2021 list of Portland's 12 best fish and chip eateries.

== See also ==
- List of Diners, Drive-Ins and Dives episodes
- List of fish and chip restaurants
- List of food trucks
- List of seafood restaurants
