= Redd on Salmon Street =

Campus for food businesses and event space in Portland

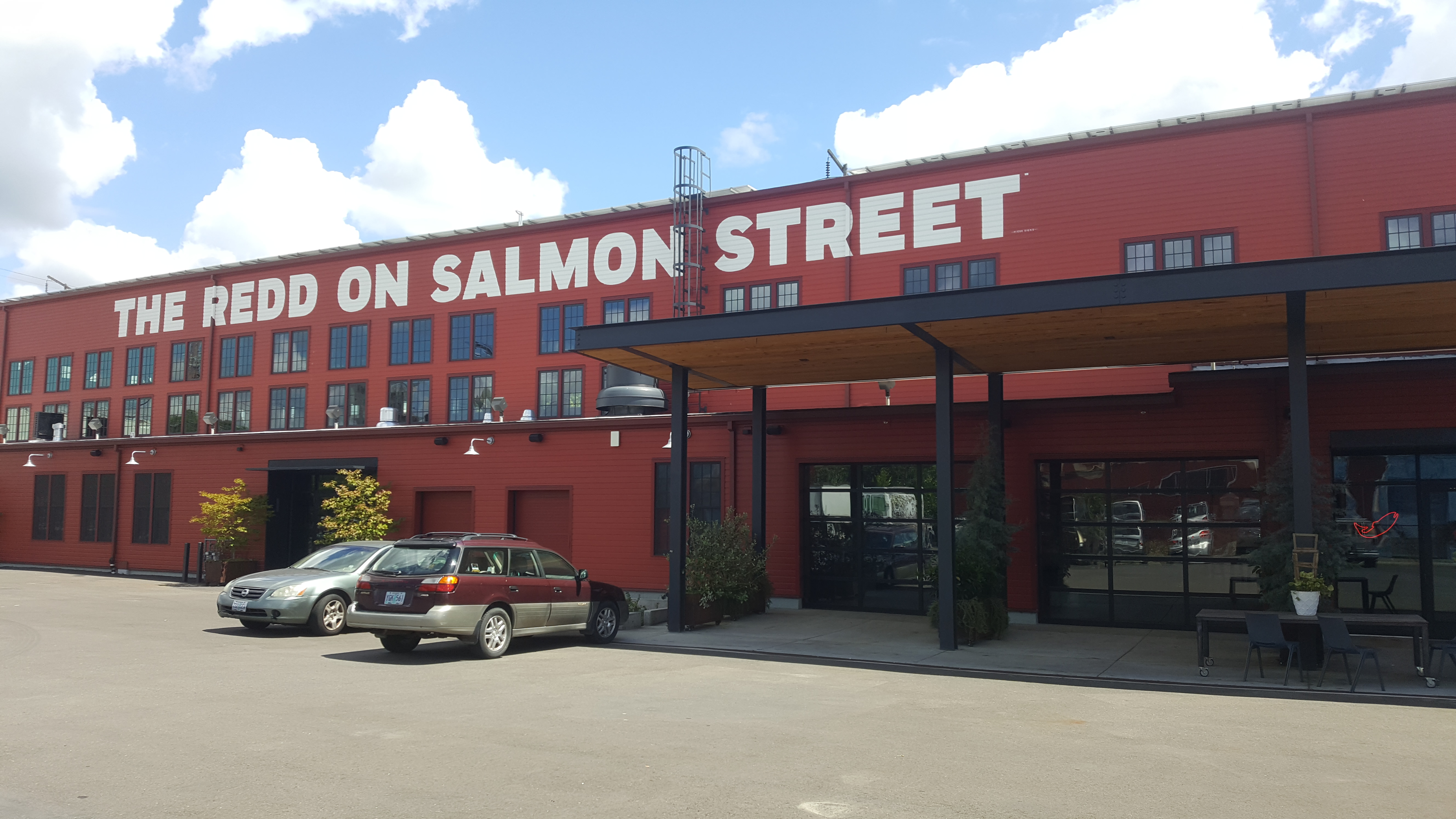
- Exterior, 2021
- Interactive map of the Redd on Salmon Street area

General information
- Location: Portland, Oregon, United States
- Coordinates: 45°30′53″N 122°39′25″W

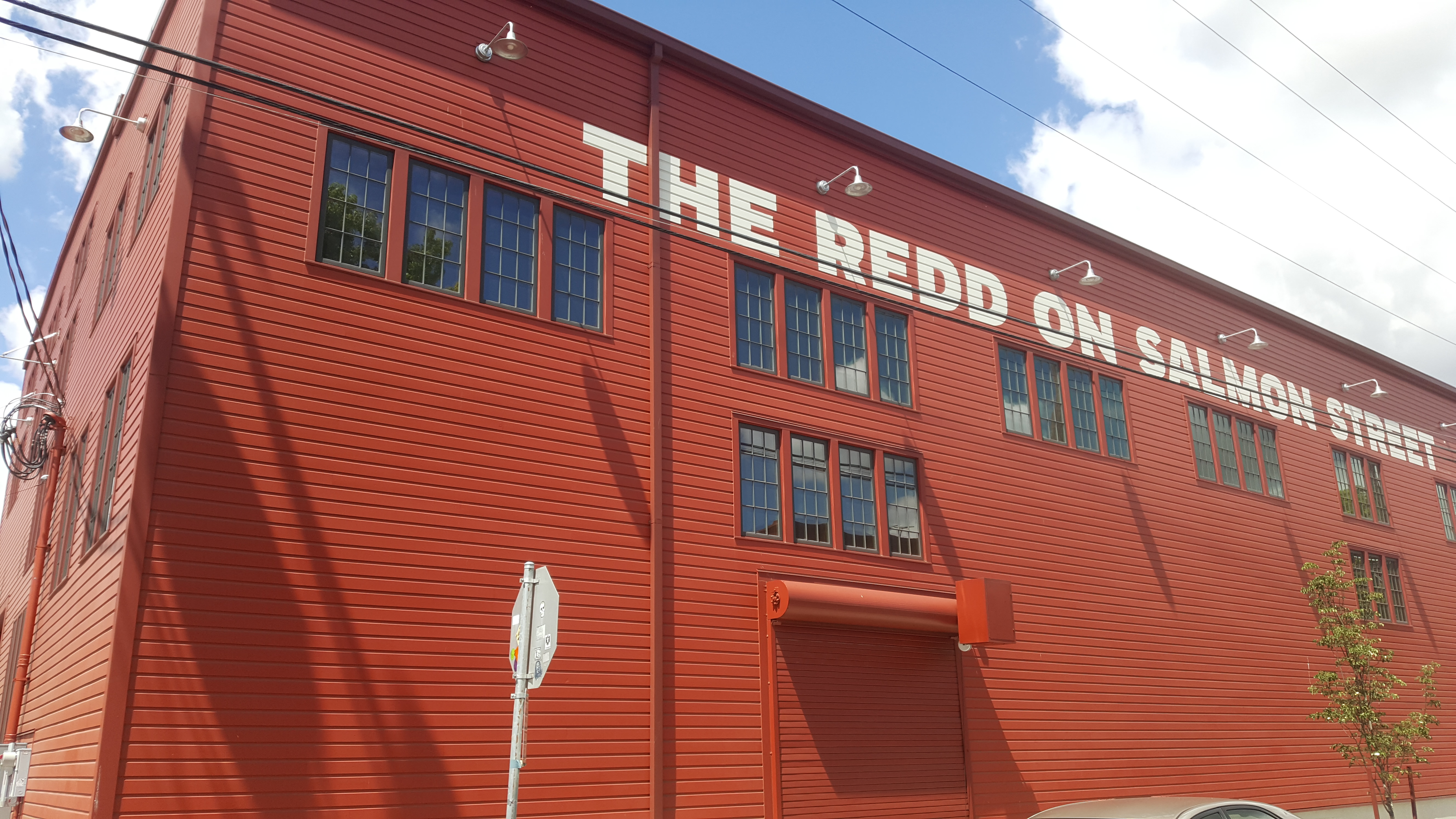
The building's exterior, 2021

The Redd on Salmon Street is a "campus" for food businesses and event space in southeast Portland, Oregon's Buckman, in the United States. The $25 million project was started in September 2015 and completed in December 2018.

In 2021, the space was featured on Top Chef: Portland.

Meals 4 Heels was a tenant. Kann Winter Village operated in the parking lot during the COVID-19 pandemic.
