= Good in the Hood =

Multicultural festival in Portland, Oregon, U.S.

- Logo
- Status: Active
- Frequency: Annually
- Location: Portland, Oregon
- Country: United States
- Website: goodnthehood.org

Good in the Hood is an annual multicultural festival in Portland, Oregon, United States. The event is billed as the largest multicultural festival in the Pacific Northwest. In 2021, Willamette Week said the festival "is one of Portland's most vital civic gatherings, celebrating the history and vibrancy of the Albina neighborhood". It features a parade, food vendors, live music, and activities for children. It has also had disc jockey sets, film screenings, performances, and a Sunday morning gospel.

== History ==
Sam Adams at the 2011 festival

The nonprofit organization Good in the Hood was established in 1990. According to KOIN, "Good in the Hood began as a festival and a nonprofit in the early '90s, when parents and employees of Holy Redeemer Catholic School decided to fundraise for the school and honor its diversity."

The event attracted approximately 6,000 people annually, as of 2018. Hundreds attended the event in 2017, despite racist threats made against the festival. Representative Earl Blumenauer was among attendees in 2017. The 2020 event was canceled because of the COVID-19 pandemic. The 2021 was virtual because of the pandemic and included a livestreamed parade, a digital marketplace, and food delivery services. Hundreds attended in 2022. Thousands attended the 2023 festival. The 2024 event was canceled. The 33rd annual event in 2026 was held at north Portland's Lillis-Albina Park and included a Teen Zone.

Quisha Light is the president of Good in the Hood. Previously, Shawn Penney has held the role. Angela Harris was the festival's co-chair in 2026.

Good in the Hood has also been represented in the Portland Rose Festival's Grand Floral Parade.

== See also ==
- Culture of Portland, Oregon
- Ethnic groups in Portland, Oregon
- List of festivals in the United States
