= Collective Oregon Eateries =

Food cart pod in Portland, Oregon, U.S.

- Logo
- Location: Portland, Oregon, U.S.
- Location within Portland, Oregon
- Coordinates: 45°29′45.5″N 122°34′41.8″W

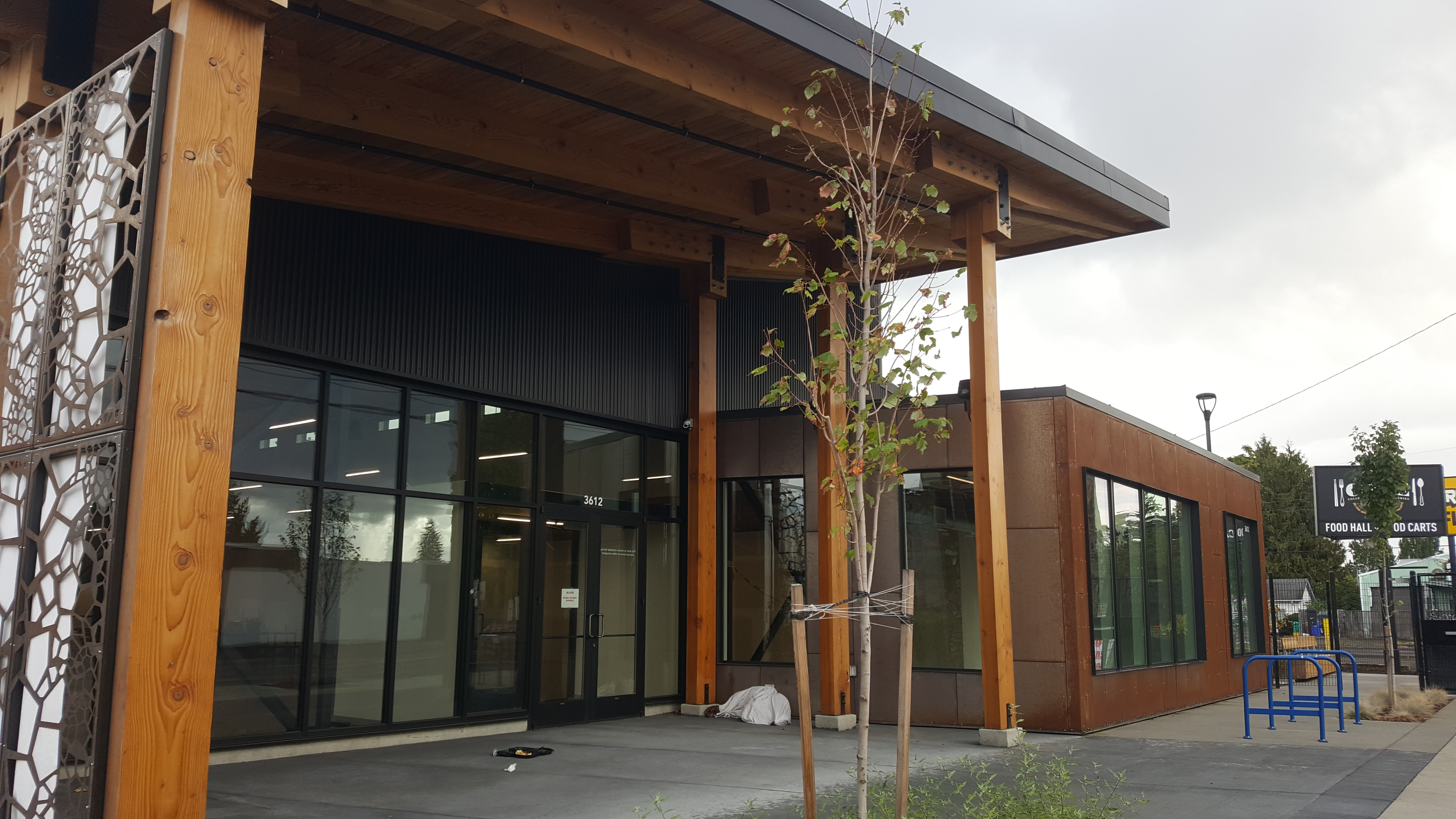
Front exterior, 2021

Collective Oregon Eateries (CORE) is a food cart pod in Portland, Oregon, United States. It began operating in southeast Portland's Lents neighborhood in 2021.

== History ==
Hanry Ho and Mandy Kao opened CORE on June 5, 2021. They had originally planned to open in 2018. Multiple businesses relocated to CORE after the Eastport Food Center pod closed in mid 2024.

The following businesses have operated at CORE:

- BKK Pad Thai
- Breakside Brewing
- Chicken and Guns (until July 2021)
- The Drip'n Crab
- Fresh Fish Poke
- From Russia with Love
- HeyDay
- Los Tamales Locos
- Jas Kitchen
- Kai's Stir Fry
- Kyla's Kitchen
- Mama's Peruvian Bowls
- Mitate
- Mumbo Gumbo
- Papi Sal's
- Publican Beer Room
- Sandy's Myanmar Cuisine (until January 2025)
- Shawarma Express
- Shark's Cove
- Sou's
- Summit Shack
