= India Festival =

Annual event in Portland, Oregon, U.S.

- Status: Active
- Frequency: Annually
- Venue: Pioneer Courthouse Square
- Location: Portland, Oregon
- Country: United States
- Attendance: Thousands (2023)
- Organiser: India Cultural Association of Portland

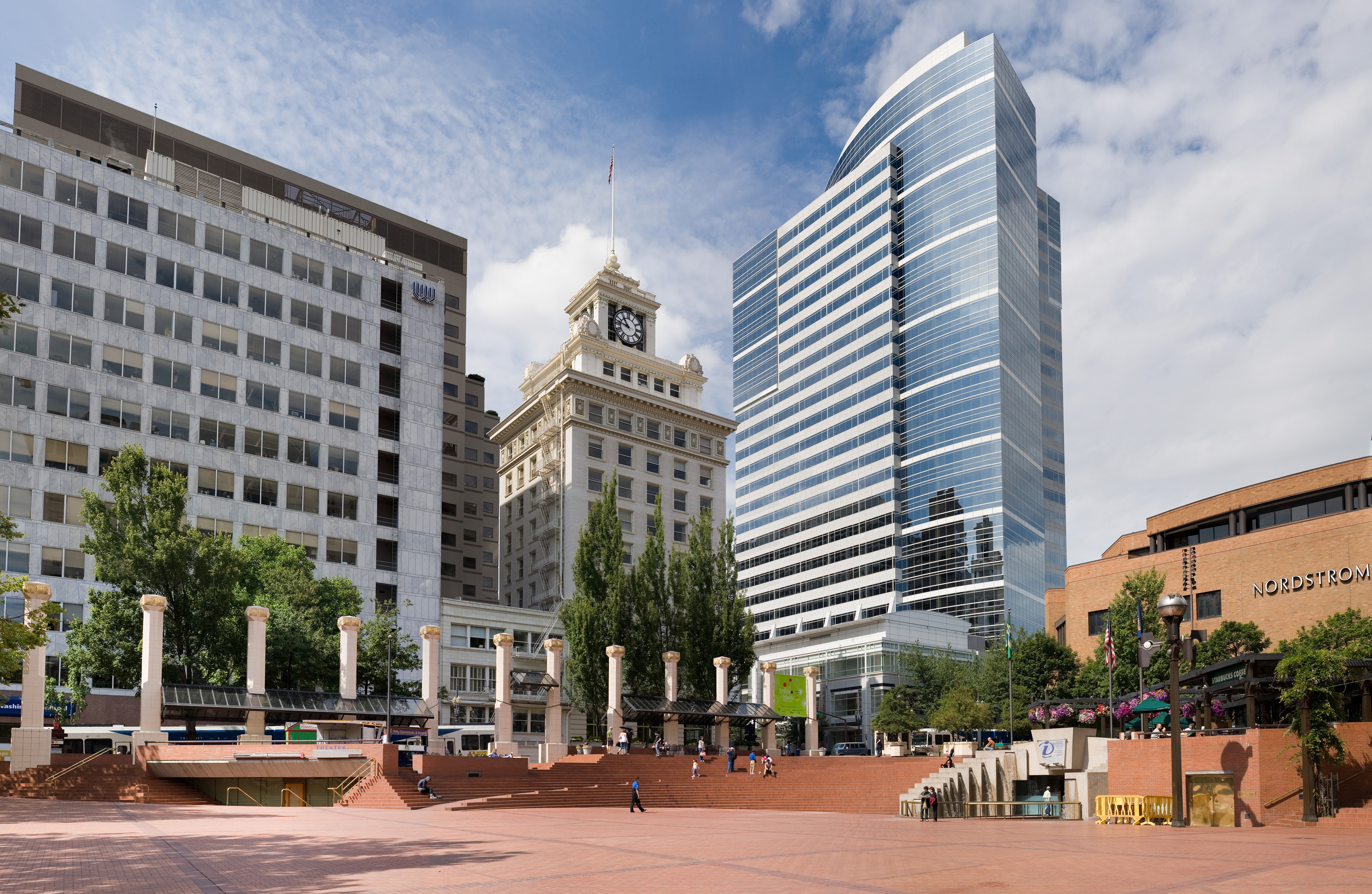
The festival is held at Pioneer Courthouse Square (pictured in 2007)

The India Festival is an annual event in Portland, Oregon, United States, celebrating India's Independence Day. The India Cultural Association of Portland has hosted the event since 1994.

Thousands of people attended the 29th annual event at Pioneer Courthouse Square in 2023. The 2024 event was in Beaverton. The festival returned to Portland in 2025. It is slated to be held at Pioneer Courthouse Square in August 2026.

== See also ==
- Culture of Portland, Oregon
- Ethnic groups in Portland, Oregon
- List of festivals in the United States
