= Kulfi (restaurant) =

Restaurant in Portland, Oregon, U.S.

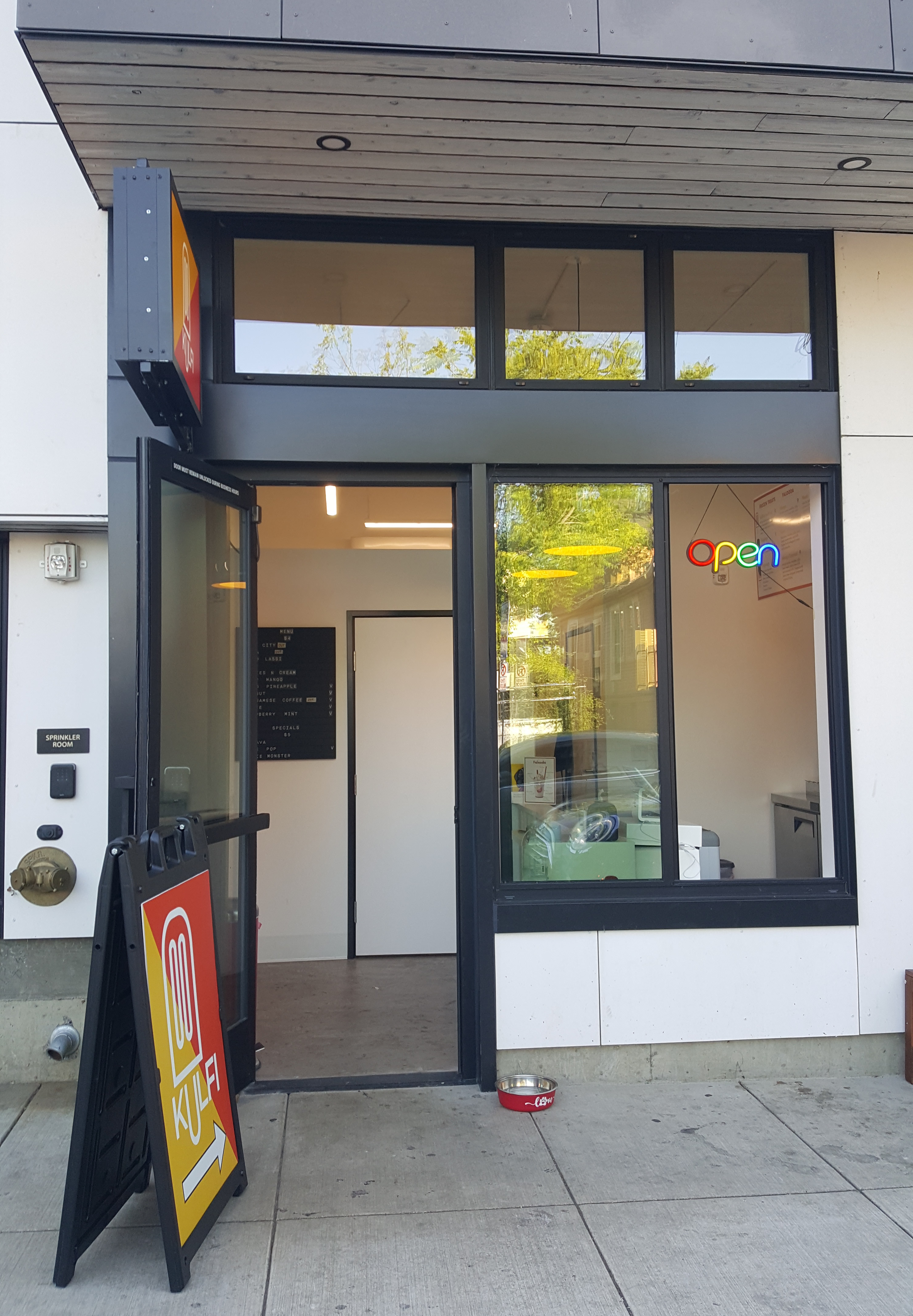
- The restaurant's exterior, 2022
- Interactive map of Kulfi

Restaurant information
- Established: 2021; 5 years ago
- Owners: Kiran Cheema; Gagan Aulakh
- Location: 5009 Northeast 15th Avenue, Portland, Multnomah, Oregon, 97211, United States
- Coordinates: 45.5593°N 122.6498°W
- Website: kulfipdx.com

Kulfi is a restaurant in Portland, Oregon. There have been two locations.

== Description ==
Kulfi serves all-natural fruit popsicles inspired by the Indian frozen dairy desserts of the same name. Vegan varieties have included jackfruit-coconut-lime, spicy watermelon, and Vietnamese coffee using beans supplied by Portland Cà Phê. The menu has also included a ricotta raspberry cheesecake bar with graham cracker crumbles, as well as the flavors chai, marionberry cheesecake, pistachio, rose water, and saffron. The Cookie Monster variety has pieces of cookie.

The mango lassi variety, made with mango, sugar, and yogurt, is the most popular flavor, as of 2022. The cream soda float is an upside down mango lassi popsicle with orange soda, whipped cream, and sprinkles. The rainbow-colored Pride pop is seasonal. Kulfi made peanut butter Oreo popsicles for Zuckercreme's "summer camp" series in 2021.

The original restaurant's interior features a tribute painting to Gabbar, the owner's late Labrador Retriever.

== History ==
Kulfi is owned by spouses Kiran Cheema and Gagan Aulakh. The business began during the COVID-19 pandemic as a pop-up restaurant, selling desserts as Kulfi Creamery and Kulfi PDX, as of mid 2021. The business operated at various locations and events, including the Come Thru Market, the Montavilla Farmers Market, and the Portland Flea, from a bicycle ice cream cart with a rainbow umbrella.

In 2022, Kulfi announced plans to open a brick and mortar shop on Alberta Street in northeast Portland's Vernon neighborhood on April 30, with four permanent and eight rotating flavors as well as falooda. According to The Oregonian's Lizzy Acker, Cheema makes 160 popsicles at a time.

A second location opened on North Williams Avenue, in the northeast Portland part of the Boise neighborhood, on April 1, 2023.

The Alberta location closed on September 22, 2024. The closing announcement said, "This decision has been tough for us because we truly love this little shop and the friends we've made in the neighborhood, but we've simply outgrown the space. We never anticipated needing a second location just months after opening our first, but you showed up for us and made it possible!" The space was later occupied by The Lime Stand.

== Reception ==
Waz Wu included Kulfi in Eater Portland's 2021 list of "This Summer's Top Spots for Dairy-Free Frozen Treats", which focused on vegan desserts. Anastasia Sloan included the business in the website's 2025 overview of the city's best dairy-free frozen desserts.
