= HeyDay (restaurant) =

Doughnut shop in Portland, Oregon, U.S.

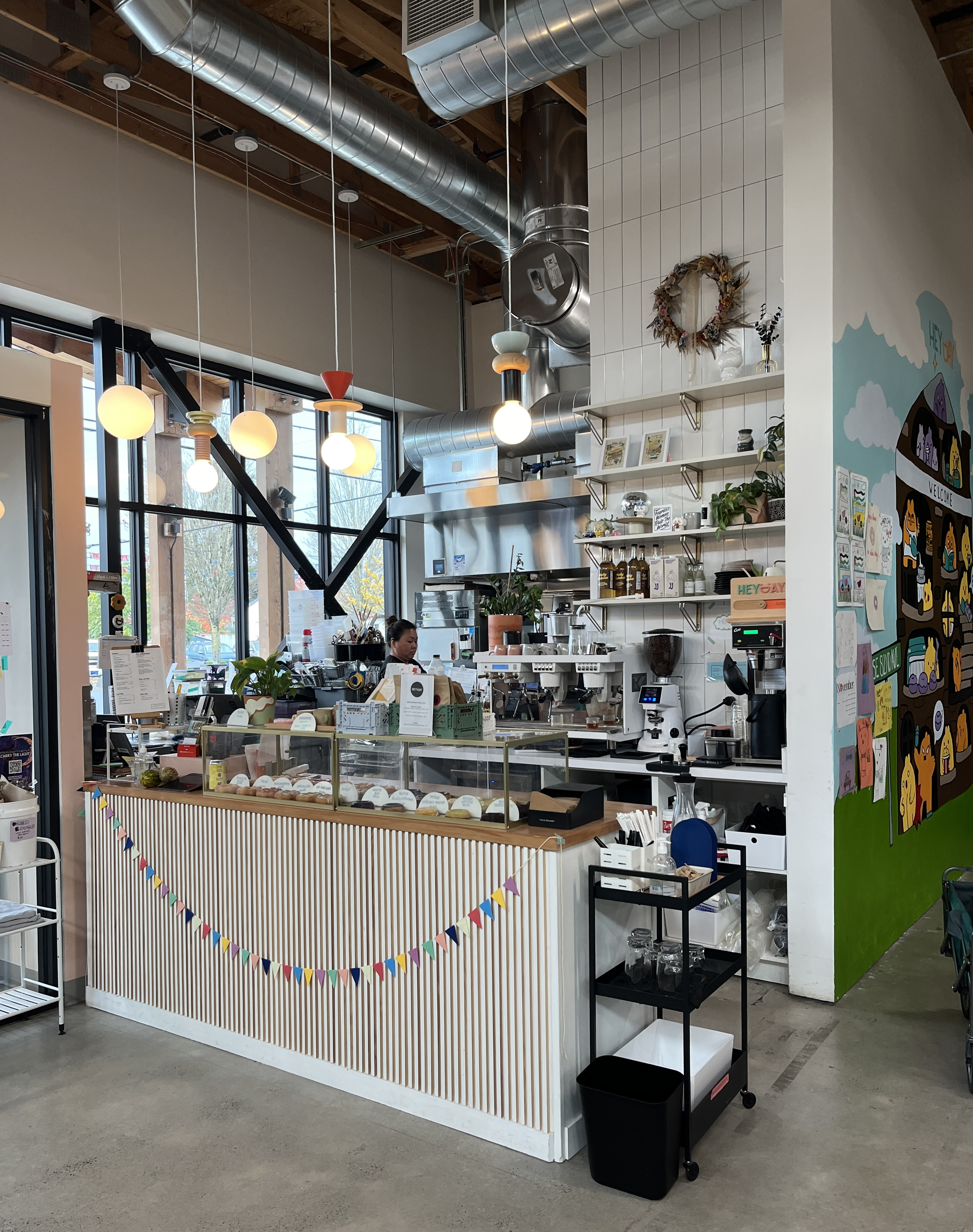
- HeyDay's counter at Collective Oregon Eateries, 2024
- Interactive map of HeyDay

Restaurant information
- Established: May 2020
- Owner: Lisa Nguyen
- Location: 3612 Southeast 82nd Avenue, Portland, Multnomah, Oregon, 97266, United States
- Coordinates: 45.4960°N 122.5782°W
- Website: heydaypdx.com

HeyDay (also known as Heyday) is a doughnut shop in Portland, Oregon, United States. Lisa Nguyen started the business as a pop-up restaurant in 2020, during the COVID-19 pandemic, before moving to the food cart pod Collective Oregon Eateries in southeast Portland's Lents neighborhood in 2023. Specializing in mochi donuts, HeyDay has garnered a positive reception.

== Description ==
The doughnut shop HeyDay operates in the food cart pod Collective Oregon Eateries (CORE) in southeast Portland's Lents neighborhood. HeyDay specializes in mochi donuts made with wheat and rice flour; most are fried, though the ube variety is baked. The nonya kaya doughnuts have pandan. Other varieties have included baked apple, black sesame, ca phe sua (Vietnamese coffee), dark chocolate peanut butter, gingersnap, guava, lychee, raspberry cheesecake, white chocolate matcha, and vanilla bean sprinkle. Doughnuts are topped with various crumbles, frostings, or glazes using Southeast Asian ingredients such as coconut sweet corn, passionfruit, and yuzu. HeyDay also makes bear-shaped cake doughnuts and other baked goods such as biscuits and danishes.

== History ==
Lisa Nguyen started HeyDay as a pop-up in May 2020, during the COVID-19 pandemic, initially selling at local cafes and tea shops including Portland Cà Phê. In 2021, Nguyen announced plans to move into CORE. In 2022, HeyDay was a vendor at the Tiger Tiger music festival. The business began operating at CORE in May 2023. In 2024, HeyDay launched Sunday Bakeshop, a rotating menu of cakes, cookies, cream puffs, macarons, pies, and other Vietnamese baked goods and desserts.

In April 2025, The Oregonian reported that HeyDay had "recently closed". HeyDay was among local Filipino establishments that participated in a fundraiser for victims of the Vancouver car attack.

=== Collaborations ===
In 2021, HeyDay collaborated with restaurants Hat Yai and XLB for the food festival Feast Portland. HeyDay also participated in the Portland edition of Bakers Box, a project highlighting Asian American and Pacific Islander (AAPI) bakers in various U.S. cities; the Portland event was hosted by Berlu and featured eighteen businesses. HeyDay partnered with ice cream company Salt & Straw to sell pandan cream sodas with vanilla ice cream to raise funds for victims of the 2023 Hawaii wildfires. HeyDay also donated some profits made from four waffle varieties: cornmeal cheese-bacon rice flour with gochujang honey; rice flour with brie and fig jam; ube; or matcha with maple syrup and condensed milk.

== Reception ==
In 2021, Denise Castañon of the magazine PDX Parent wrote: "HeyDay doughnuts are made for Instagram. The business uses the social media outlet to spread the word, and the photogenic, uniquely shaped and charmingly decorated rings cry out to be posted on your feed." Zoe Baillargeon included HeyDay in Bon Appétit's 2023 overview of Portland's eight best doughnut shops. Rebecca Roland and Nick Townsend included the business in Eater Portland's 2024 list of the city's "most delicious" doughnuts.

== See also ==
- List of bakeries
- List of doughnut shops
