= Meals 4 Heels =

Defunct food delivery service and restaurant in Portland, Oregon, U.S.

Restaurant information
- Established: 2019
- Location: 831 Southeast Salmon Street, Portland, Multnomah, Oregon, 97214, United States
- Website: meals4heels.com

Meals 4 Heels was a food delivery service and restaurant in Portland, Oregon. Nikeisah Newton founded the food delivery service catering to sex workers and strippers in 2019, and Meals 4 Heels began operating from Redd on Salmon Street in 2021. The company's tagline was "Pro Black, pro Brown, pro trans, pro science, pro hoe." The menu included fritters, vegan noodle bowls, and other vegetarian options. Beth Nakamura of The Oregonian described the food as "health-minded". It was a lesbian-owned business.

== See also ==
- List of defunct restaurants of the United States
