= Ha VL =

Vietnamese restaurant in Portland, Oregon, U.S.

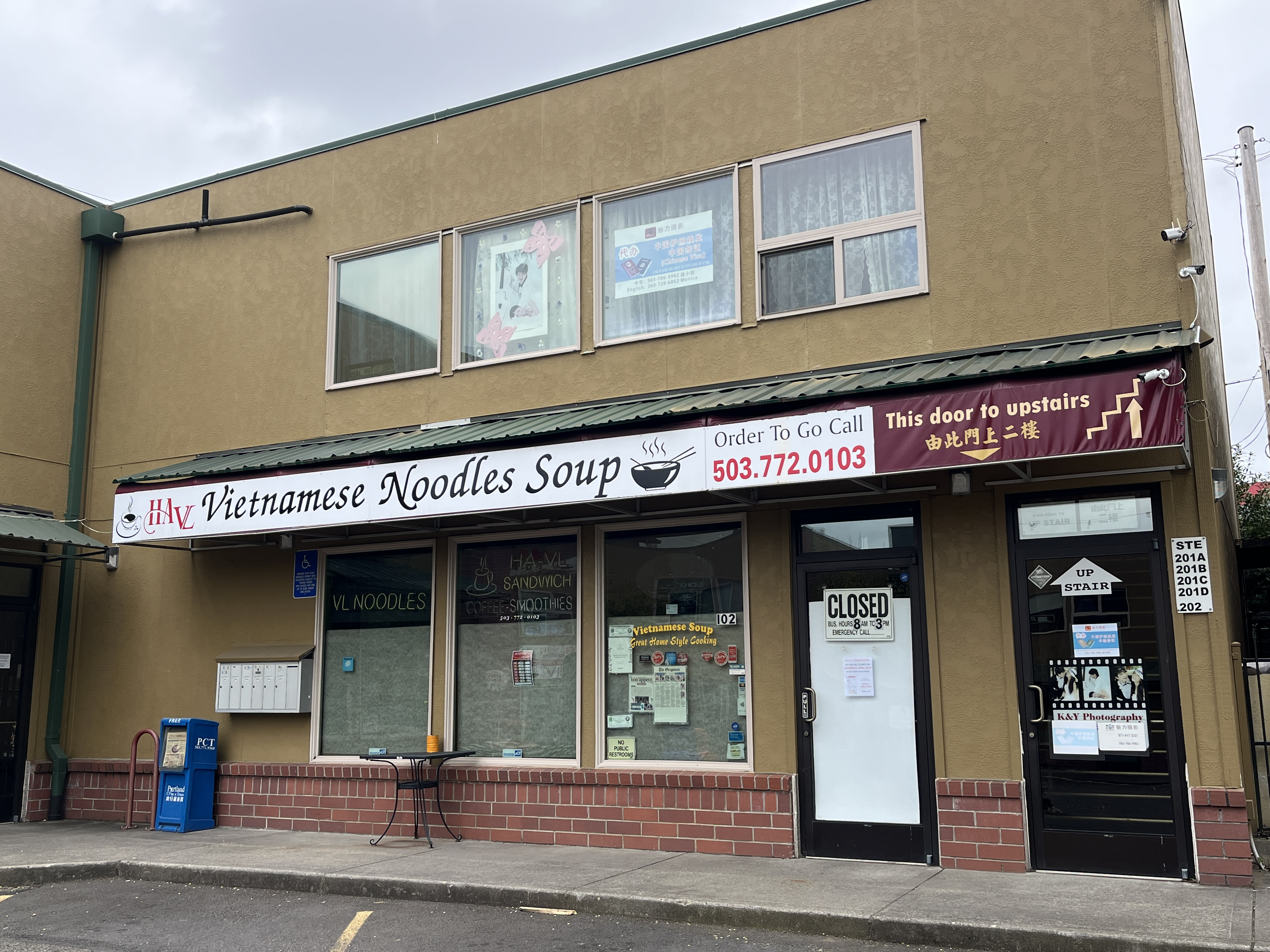
- The restaurant's exterior in 2025
- Interactive map of Ha VL

Restaurant information
- Food type: Vietnamese
- Location: 2738 Southeast 82nd Avenue, Portland, Oregon, 97266, United States
- Coordinates: 45.5026°N 122.5784°W

Ha VL is a Vietnamese restaurant in Portland, Oregon, United States.

== Description ==
The restaurant serves soups, including pho.

== History ==
Ha (Christina) Luu and William Vuong opened Ha VL in 2004. Rose VL Deli is a "sister" restaurant. Annam VL opened in 2024.

== Reception ==
In 2017, the restaurant's Luu was nominated in the Best Chef Northwest category of the James Beard Foundation Awards. Ha VL was nominated in the Outstanding Restaurant category in 2020. In 2019, Michael Russell of The Oregonian called the restaurant "one of America’s most celebrated Vietnamese soup destinations". He included Ha VL in the newspaper's 2020 list of the city's 40 best inexpensive restaurants and 2025 list of the 21 best restaurants in southeast Portland. Russell also ranked the business number 8 in The Oregonian's 2025 list of Portland's 40 best restaurants.

Ha VL was included in The Infatuation's 2024 list of Portland's best restaurants. The business was included in Portland Monthly's 2025 list of 25 restaurants "that made Portland".

== See also ==
- List of Vietnamese restaurants
