= Bombay Cricket Club =

Defunct Indian restaurant in Portland, Oregon, U.S.

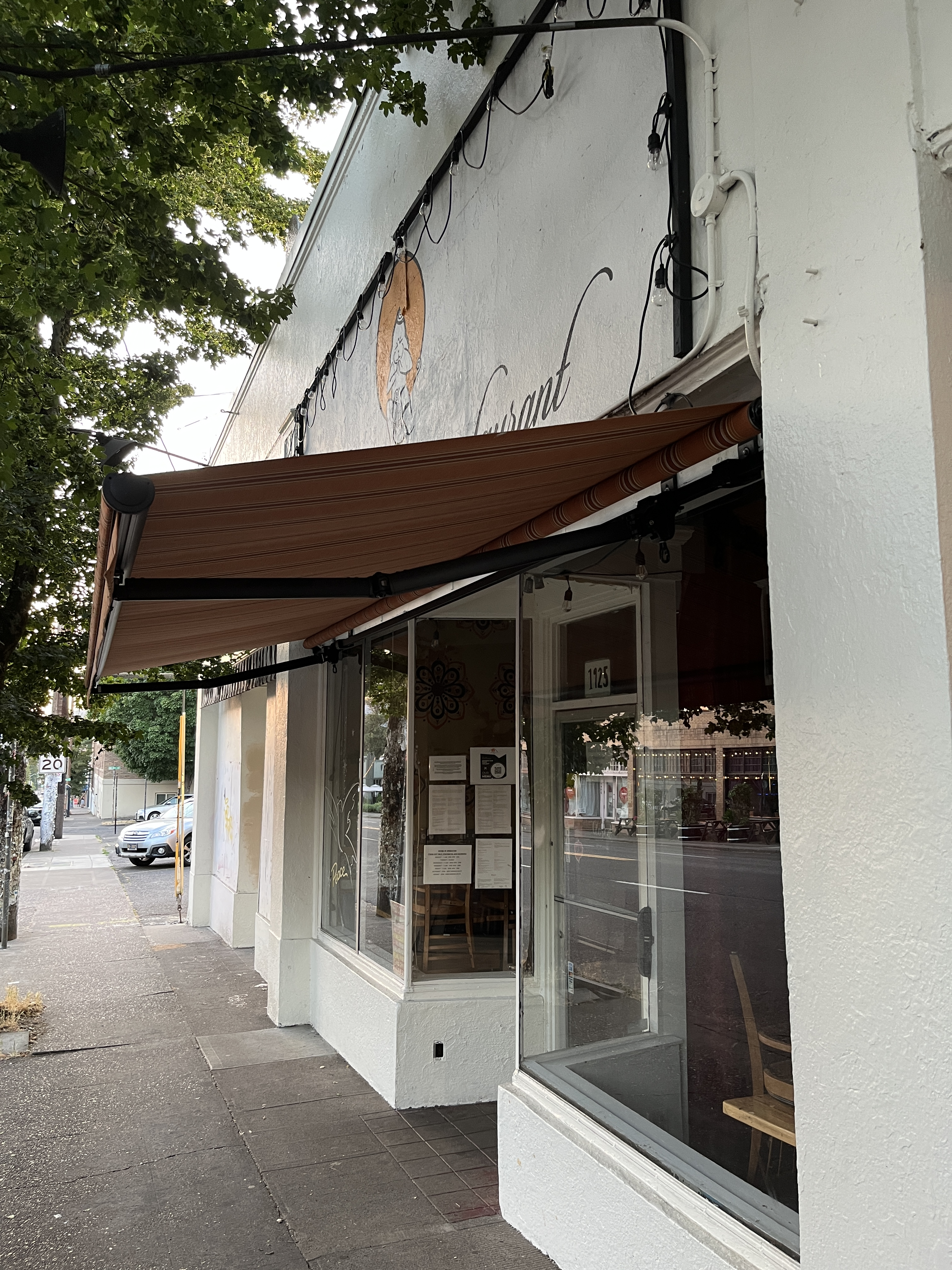
- Bombay Cricket Club occupied the space which later housed Maruti Indian Restaurant (pictured in 2022)
- Interactive map of Bombay Cricket Club

Restaurant information
- Established: 1995
- Closed: August 31, 2016
- Owners: Karim and Sherri Ahmad
- Food type: Indian; Middle Eastern
- Location: 1925 Southeast Hawthorne Boulevard, Portland, Multnomah, Oregon, 97214, United States
- Coordinates: 45°30′44.3″N 122°38′45.7″W

Bombay Cricket Club was an Indian and Middle Eastern restaurant in Portland, Oregon's Buckman neighborhood, in the United States. Karim and Sherri Ahmad owned and operated the business from 1995 to 2016. The popular restaurant screened cricket matches and garnered a positive reception. It was named the city's best Indian restaurant by Portland Monthly in 2004.

== Description ==
Bombay Cricket Club was an Indian and Middle Eastern restaurant on Hawthorne Boulevard in southeast Portland's Buckman neighborhood, owned by Karim and Sherri Ahmad. One guide by Moon Publications described Bombay Cricket Club as an "always packed two-tiered" restaurant with many vegetarian options. The business aired cricket matches on televisions.

Michael Russell of The Oregonian wrote, "Like its predecessor, Masala Grove, the Bombay Cricket Club combined decadent Indian dishes with a handful of Middle Eastern specialties." The "comprehensive" menu included coconut curry with prawns, lamb vindaloo, okra, samosas, tandoori lamb, and mango margaritas.

According to Portland Monthly, Karim's chai recipe "reflects the Kashmiri influence common in his native Punjab". The magazine's Deena Prichep wrote in 2010: "Lightly sweetened and seasoned with clean-tasting cardamom and aromatic saffron from India’s Moghul tradition, the drink has an interplay of sweet, sharp, floral, and rich flavors that seem to evolve with each sip, as the spices settle and your palate teases them apart."

== History ==
Karim and Sherri Ahmad opened the restaurant in 1995. The owners said approximately 90 percent of their customers were "repeat visitors".

In August 2016, the Admads confirmed plans to retire and close the restaurant on August 31, after operating for 21 years. Samantha Bakall included Bombay in The Oregonian's list of the 15 "biggest Portland restaurant and bar closings of 2016". The vegetarian Indian restaurant Maruti began operating in the space in November.

== Reception ==
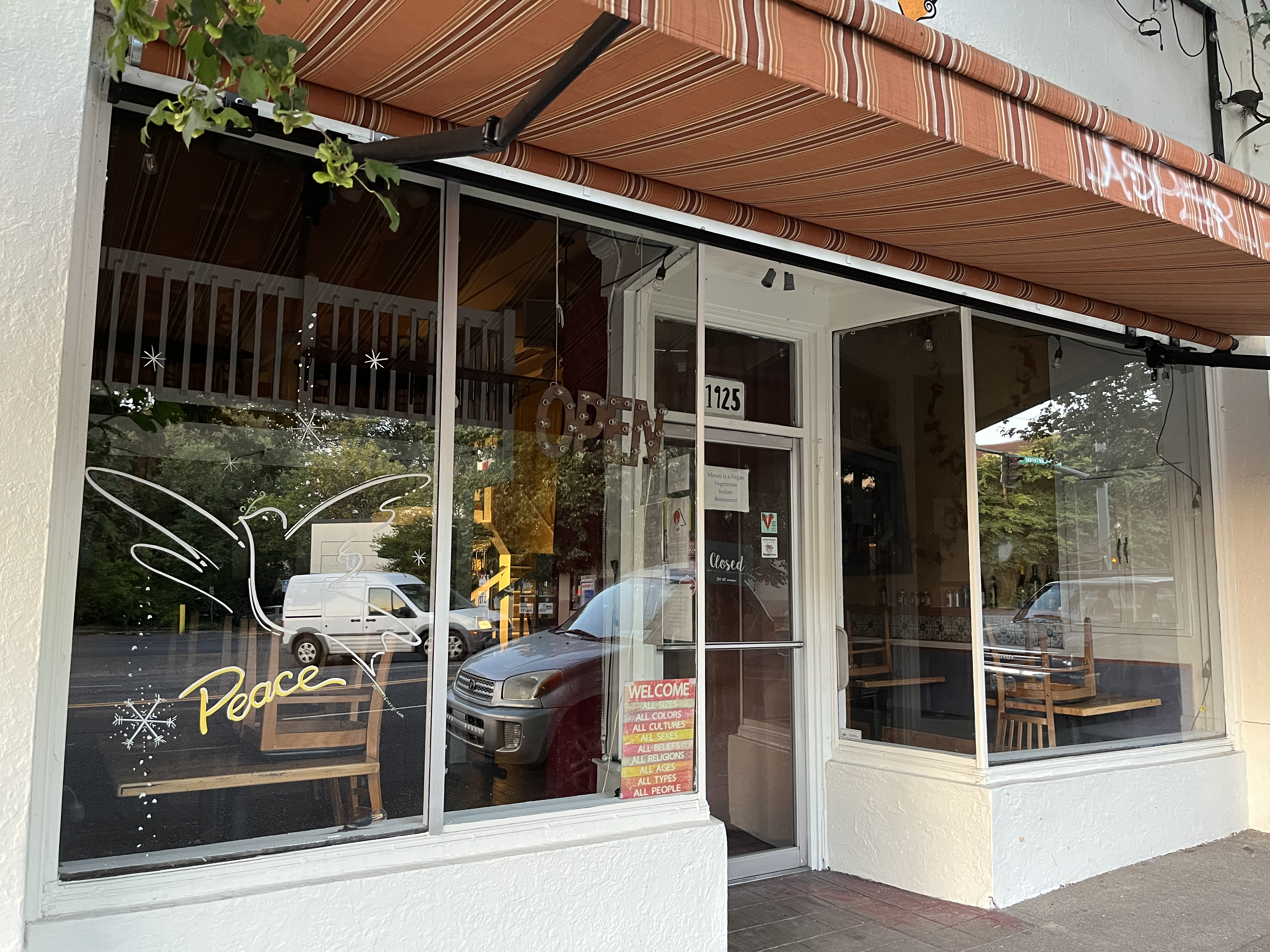
Bombay Cricket Club occupied the space which later housed Maruti Indian Restaurant (pictured in 2022)

In 2003, Willamette Week's Kelly Clarke said, "Saburo's, along with places like Bombay Cricket Club and Escape from New York Pizza shake up routine meals by challenging our notion of what makes great restaurants tick." Bombay Cricket Club was named Best Indian Restaurant by Portland Monthly in 2004. In 2016, the magazine's Michelle Porter said the restaurant had "[maintained] its reputation (and long lines) through several food revolutions—including the rise of Bollywood Theater".

In 2016, Michael Russell of The Oregonian said the tandoori lamb was a "standout" and wrote, "In the days before Bollywood Theater introduced Portland to Indian street snacks and Hillsboro's Indian food scene had blossomed, Bombay Cricket Club was considered among the best Indian restaurants in Portland. Judging from recent comments on the restaurant's Facebook page, it remained a favorite for many both inside and outside of Portland." The newspaper's Grant Butler included Bombay Cricket Club in a 2016 list of "97 long-gone Portland restaurants we wish were still around", writing, "For years, one of the happiest places along lower Southeast Hawthorne Avenue was a seat at the bar at this popular Northern Indian spot."

== See also ==
- List of Indian restaurants
- List of Middle Eastern restaurants
