= Maruti Indian Restaurant =

Indian restaurant in Portland, Oregon, U.S.

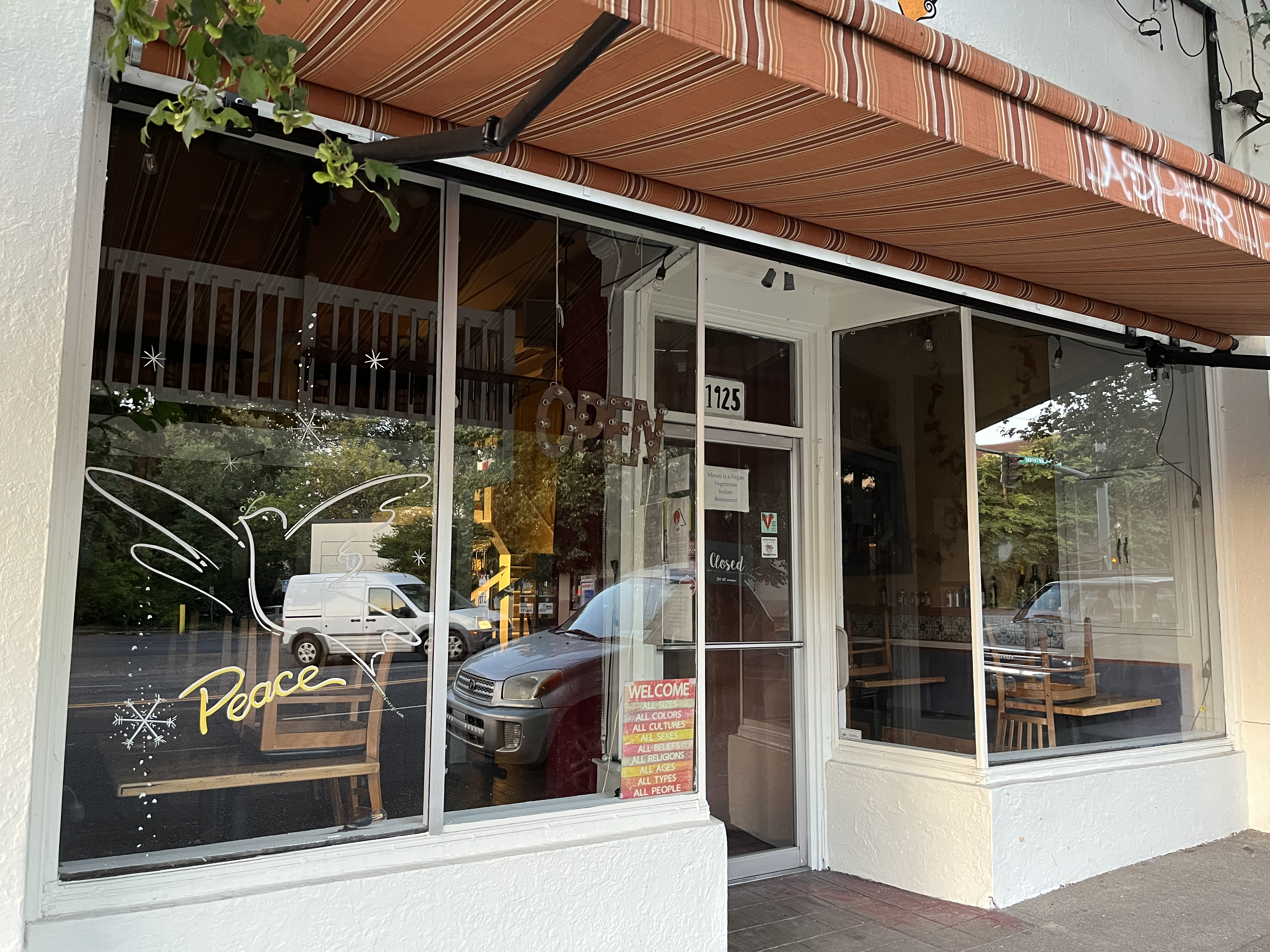
- The restaurant's exterior, 2022
- Interactive map of Maruti Indian Restaurant

Restaurant information
- Food type: Indian
- Location: 1925 Southeast Hawthorne Boulevard, Portland, Multnomah, Oregon, 97214, United States
- Coordinates: 45.5124°N 122.6459°W

Maruti Indian Restaurant, or simply Maruti, is an Indian restaurant in Portland, Oregon.

== Description ==
Maruti is a vegetarian restaurant serving Indian cuisine on Hawthorne Boulevard in southeast Portland's Buckman neighborhood. The menu has included biryani and tikka masala.

== History ==
Rudra Parmar and chef Falguni Khanna opened Maruti in Portland on November 12, 2016, in a space which previously housed Bombay Cricket Club. Previously, Maruti operated in Mount Shasta, California for approximately two years. According to the Portland Mercury's Isabella Garcia, Maruti offers "Indian staples with an emphasis on sustainability" and uses "organic, non-GMO, and sustainably sourced ingredients and materials throughout the restaurant".

== Reception ==
Maruti has been included in several Eater Portland lists, including Michelle DeVona's 2018 overview of recommended eateries in the Hawthorne District, Waz Wu's 2021 overview of "Where to Find Standout Vegan Curries in Portland", and Ron Scott's 2021 list of "exceptional" Indian food in the city. Additionally, Jenni Moore recommended the Baingan Bharta in a 2020 list of "13 Standout Vegetarian Meals in Portland", and Wu included the restaurant in a 2023 list of "Portland’s Primo Special Occasion Restaurants for Vegans and Vegetarians". Rebecca Roland included Maruti in the website's 2025 overview of Portland's best Indian food.

In 2017, Willamette Week's Matthew Korfhage included Maruti in a list of "The Best Restaurants on Hawthorne and Belmont in Southeast Portland". The newspaper also said in 2019, "for vegans and vegetarians, this place is like a gift from Vishnu".

== See also ==
- List of Indian restaurants
