= Top Burmese =

Burmese restaurant in the Portland, Oregon metropolitan area

Restaurant information
- Location: Oregon, United States
- Website: topburmese.com

Top Burmese is a small chain of restaurants serving Burmese cuisine in the Portland, Oregon metropolitan area, in the United States. Owners Kalvin and Poe Myint started the business in 2019.

There are multiple outposts in addition to the original restaurant on 21st Avenue in northwest Portland's Northwest District. Top Burmese Bistro Royale has operated in Beaverton since 2020, Top Burmese Burma Joy opened on 23rd Avenue in the Northwest District in 2021, and Top Burmese Ambassador opened in Hillsboro in 2022. Top Burmese expanded beyond Burmese cuisine with Old Asia Teahouse, which opened in Beaverton in 2023. Top Burmese began operating at Portland's Moda Center in 2024.

== Description and history ==
=== Original restaurant ===
Top Burmese began as a "virtual restaurant" in early 2019, operating via delivery and take-out. Delivery platforms included DoorDash, Grubhub, Postmates, and Uber Eats, and order could also be picked up at the kitchen on 16th Avenue in northwest Portland's Northwest District. The first Top Burmese restaurant has operated on 21st Avenue in the Northwest District, since September 19, 2019. The menu includes laphet (fermented tea-leaf salad with sunflower seeds, sesame, and peanuts), samosas, and paratha served with paprika and turmeric-based curries. The restaurant is most known for the tea leaf salad.

=== Outposts ===
Top Burmese Bistro Royale opened in Beaverton in 2020 and has an "Indian-influenced" menu. Robots help serve food at the restaurant.

Top Burmese Burma Joy (or Burma Joy Noodle House) is located on 23rd Avenue in the Northwest District and has focused on Chinese-inspired noodles since 2021. The restaurant served Tea Leaf "Laphet" Dumplings during The Oregonian's annual Dumpling Week in 2022.

Top Burmese Ambassador opened on Hillsboro's Main Street in 2022.

Top Burmese for the first time branches beyond Burmese cuisine with their new restaurant concept centered around tea. Old Asia Teahouse & Restaurant features assortment of loose leaf tea from various regions, paired with pan Asiatic dishes from Burma, Singapore, and Malaysia. Top Burmese's Old Asia opened in Beaverton in 2023.

Top Burmese began operating at Moda Center starting with 2024-25 NBA Season in October 2024, selling its popular samosas, night market style chicken wings, Burmese curries, and salads.

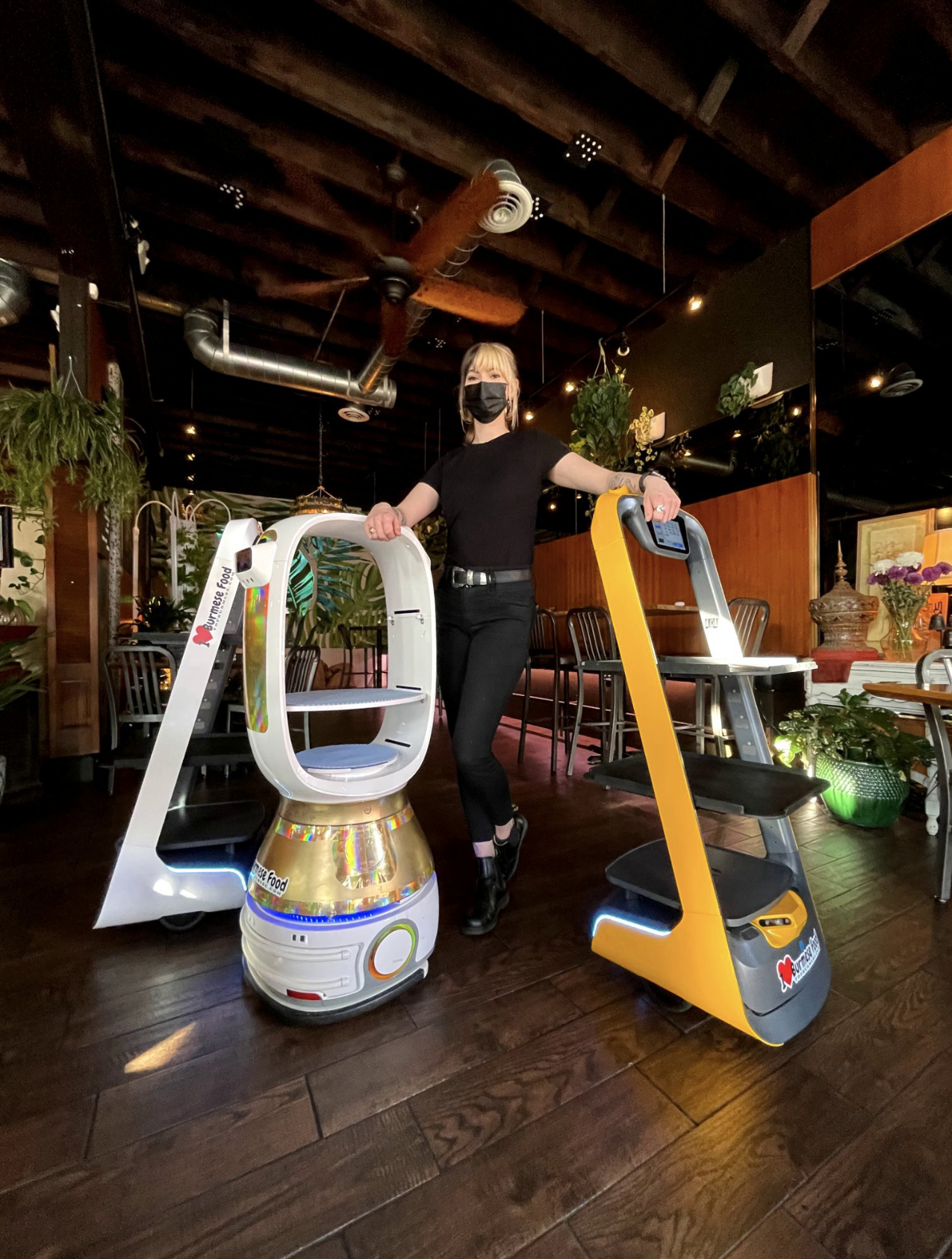
Food service robots at Top Burmese Bistro Royale

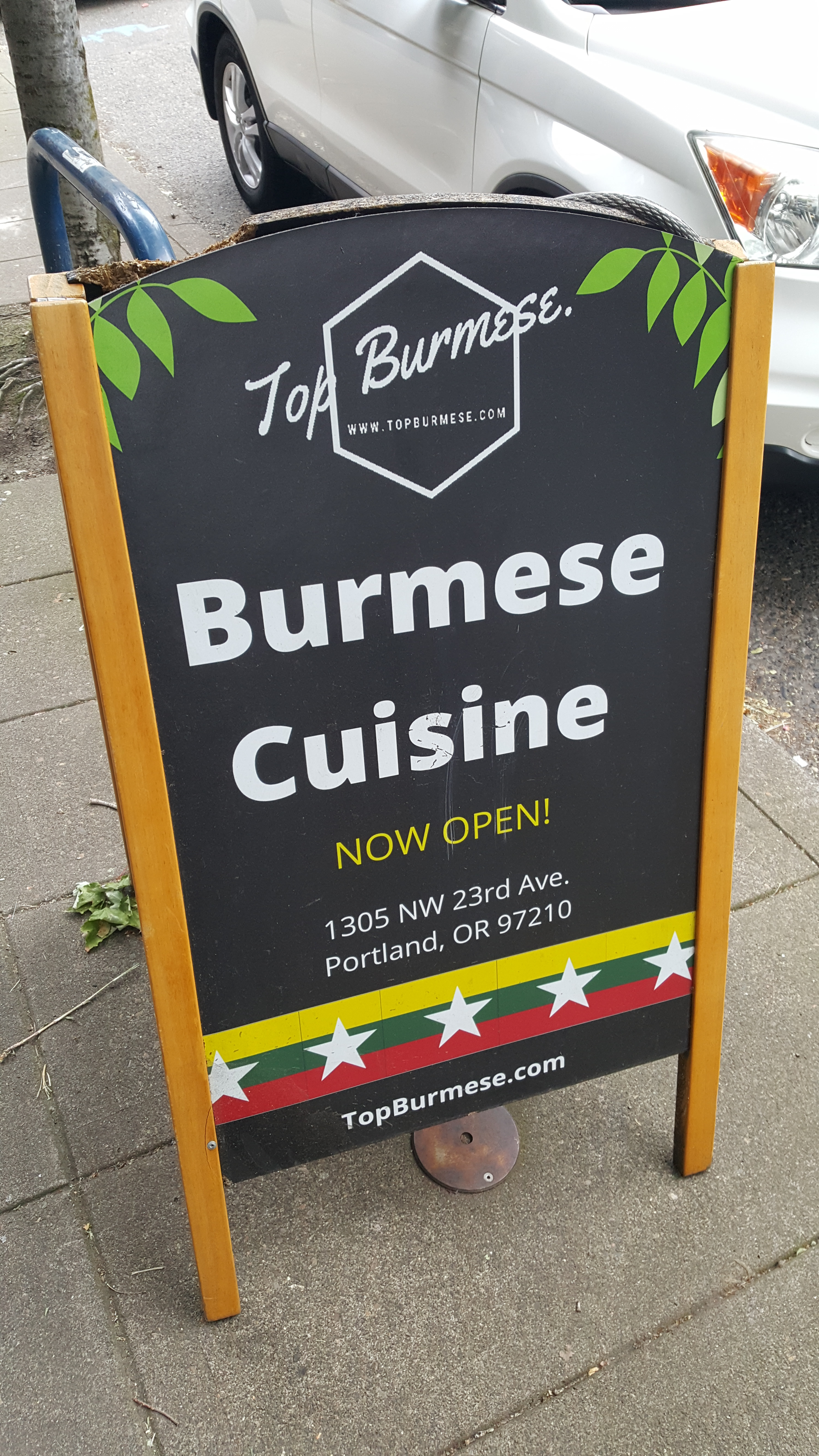
Sign for Top Burmese outside Burma Joy, 2022

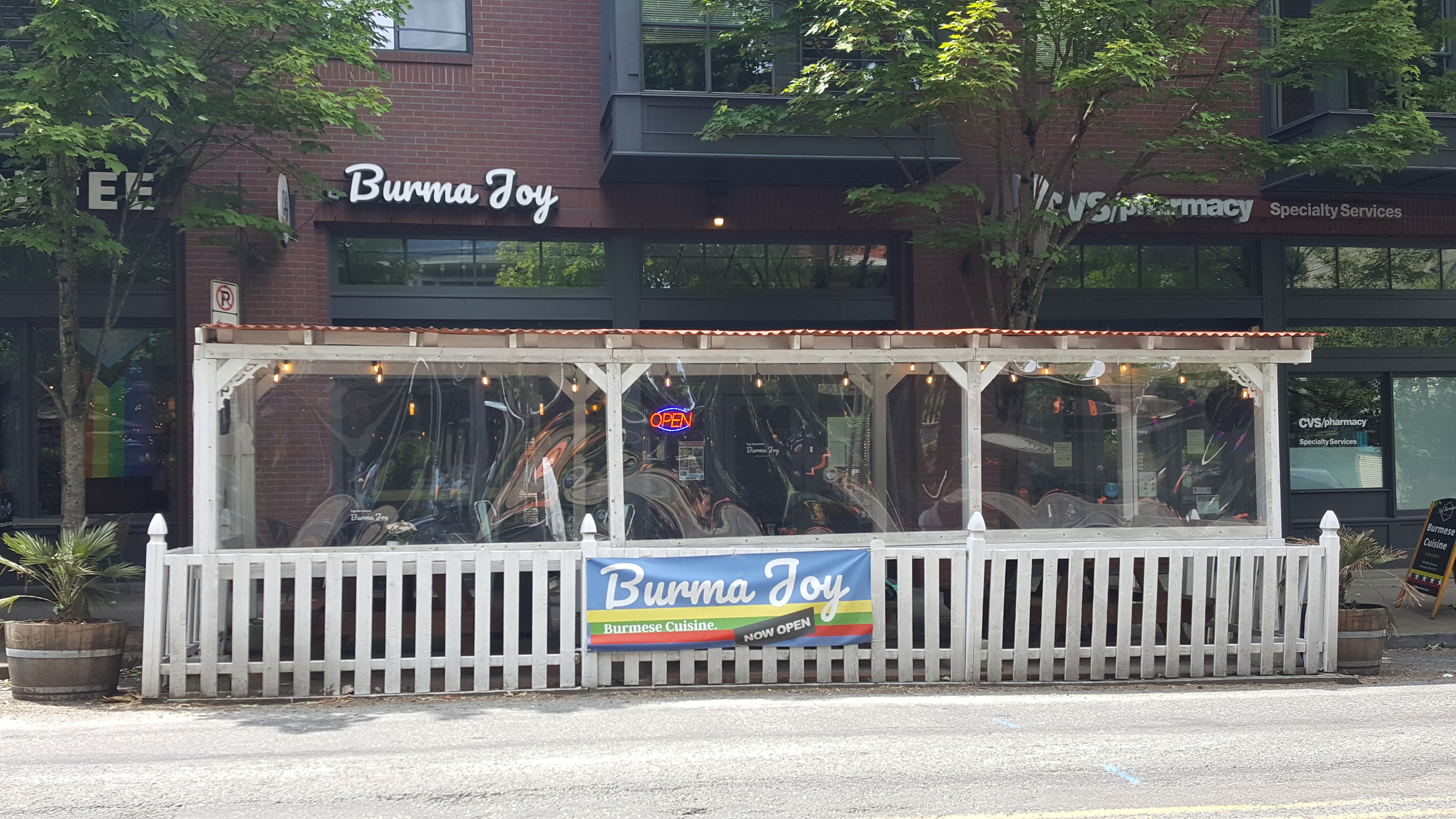
Exterior of Burma Joy in northwest Portland, 2022

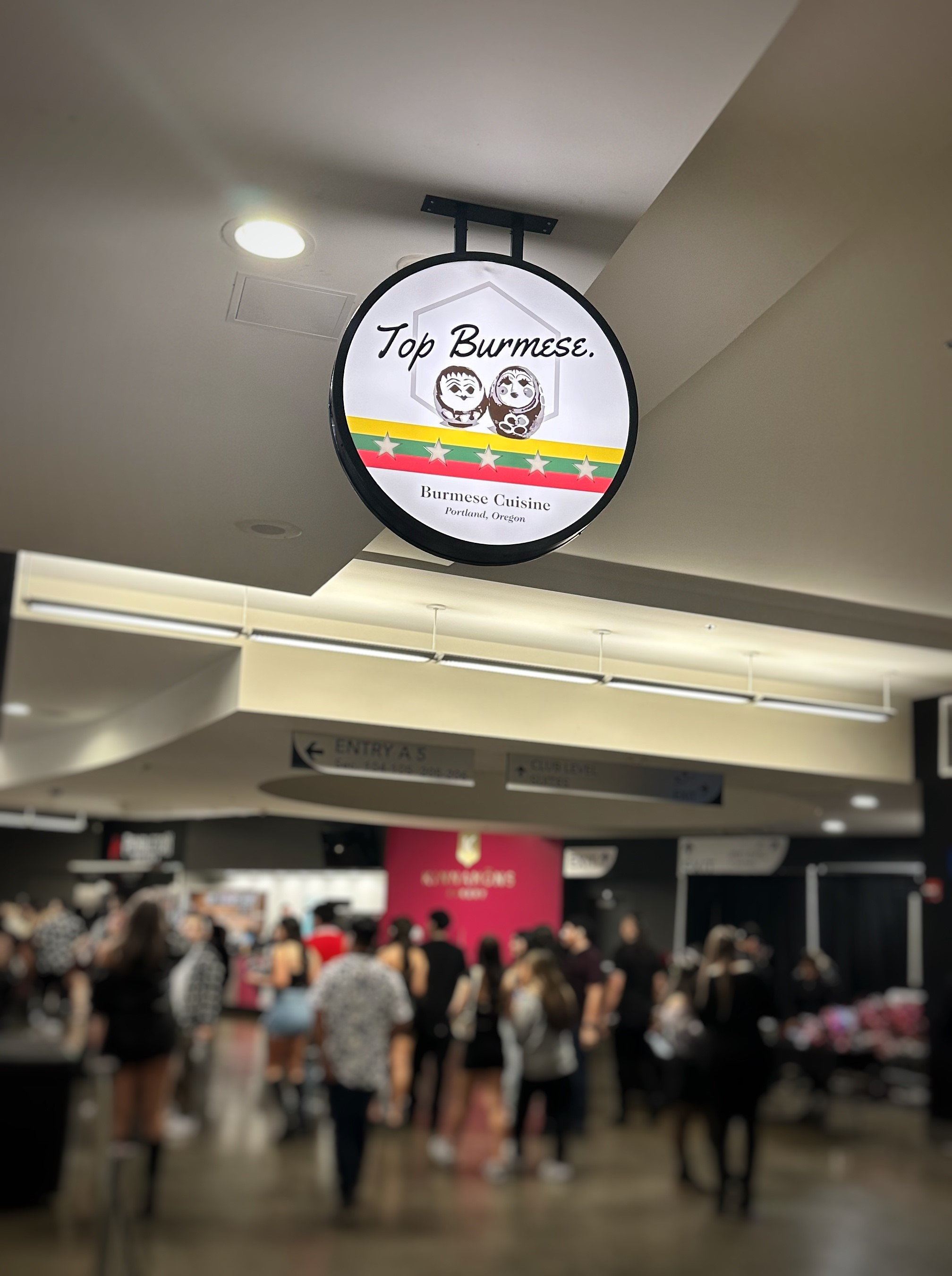
Top Burmese concession at Moda Center

== Reception ==
Nick Woo included Top Burmese's Ametha Ohn Htamin in Eater Portland's 2019 list of 13 "stellar" curries in the city. The website's Waz Wu included the samusa thoke served by the original restaurant and Bistro Royale in a 2020 overview of "where to find satisfying vegan soups in Portland". Wu also included the restaurants in a 2021 list of Portland's "most comforting" vegan noodle soups", and a 2023 list of the city's "primo special occasion" restaurants for vegans and vegetarians. Eater Portland has also included Top Burmese Bistro Royale in a list of 16 "exemplary" restaurants in Beaverton. The Oregonian included Top Burmese in a 2021 list of "Best New Portland Restaurants". FSR Magazine listed Top Burmese as "America's Top 50 Independent Restaurants for 2024" in their July 2024 issue. In November 2025, FSR magazine named Top Burmese to its "NextGen 25: Rising Restaurants to Watch Beyond 2025" list, recognizing the company as one of 25 emerging full-service restaurant brands in North America.
