= Rose VL Deli =

Vietnamese restaurant in Portland, Oregon, U.S.

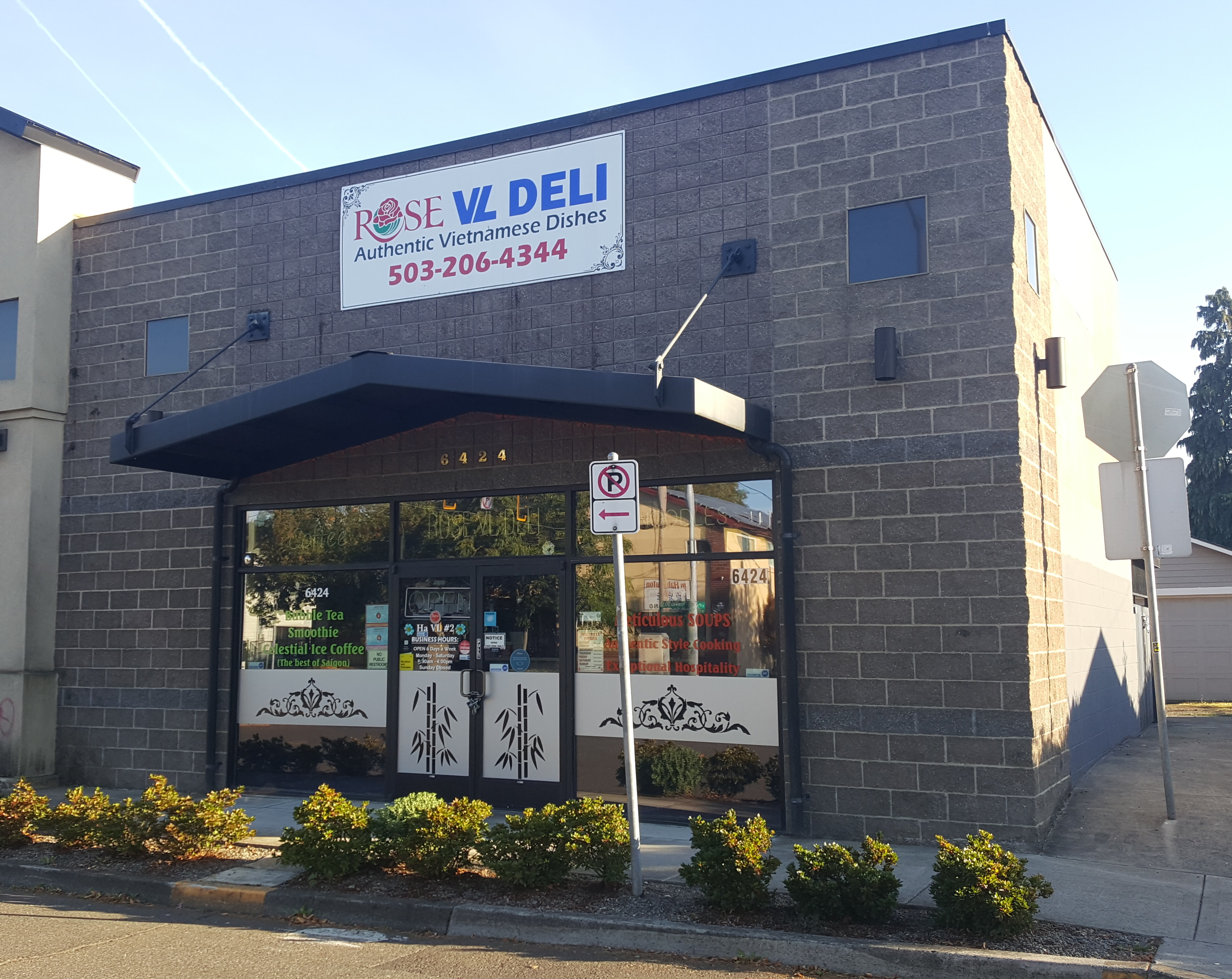
- The restaurant's exterior in 2021
- Interactive map of Rose VL Deli

Restaurant information
- Food type: Vietnamese
- Location: 6424 Southeast Powell Boulevard, Portland, Multnomah, Oregon, 97206, United States
- Coordinates: 45.4972°N 122.5967°W

Rose VL Deli is a Vietnamese restaurant in Portland, Oregon, United States. It is related to sibling establishments Ha VL and Annam VL (2023).

== Description ==
Rose VL Deli is a Vietnamese restaurant in southeast Portland's Foster-Powell neighborhood. The restaurant is located in a strip mall and the interior has been described as "cheerfully purple-and-white".

=== Menu ===
The menu includes noodles (including cao lầu), soups, bánh mì, and coffee (including Vietnamese iced coffee). Soup options vary depending on the day; varieties include chicken curry, crabflake, fishcake, and turmeric noodle.

== History ==
Christina Ha Luu and William Vuoung opened Rose VL Deli in 2015. The restaurant began serving lunch in 2016. In 2019, Rose VL Deli began operating on Sundays and not on Thursdays. The restaurant operated via take-out at times, during the COVID-19 pandemic.

Rose VL Deli is related to Ha VL, opened by the same owners in 2004. In 2019, the couple confirmed plans to open a third restaurant in Beaverton. Annam VL opened in 2023.

== Reception ==
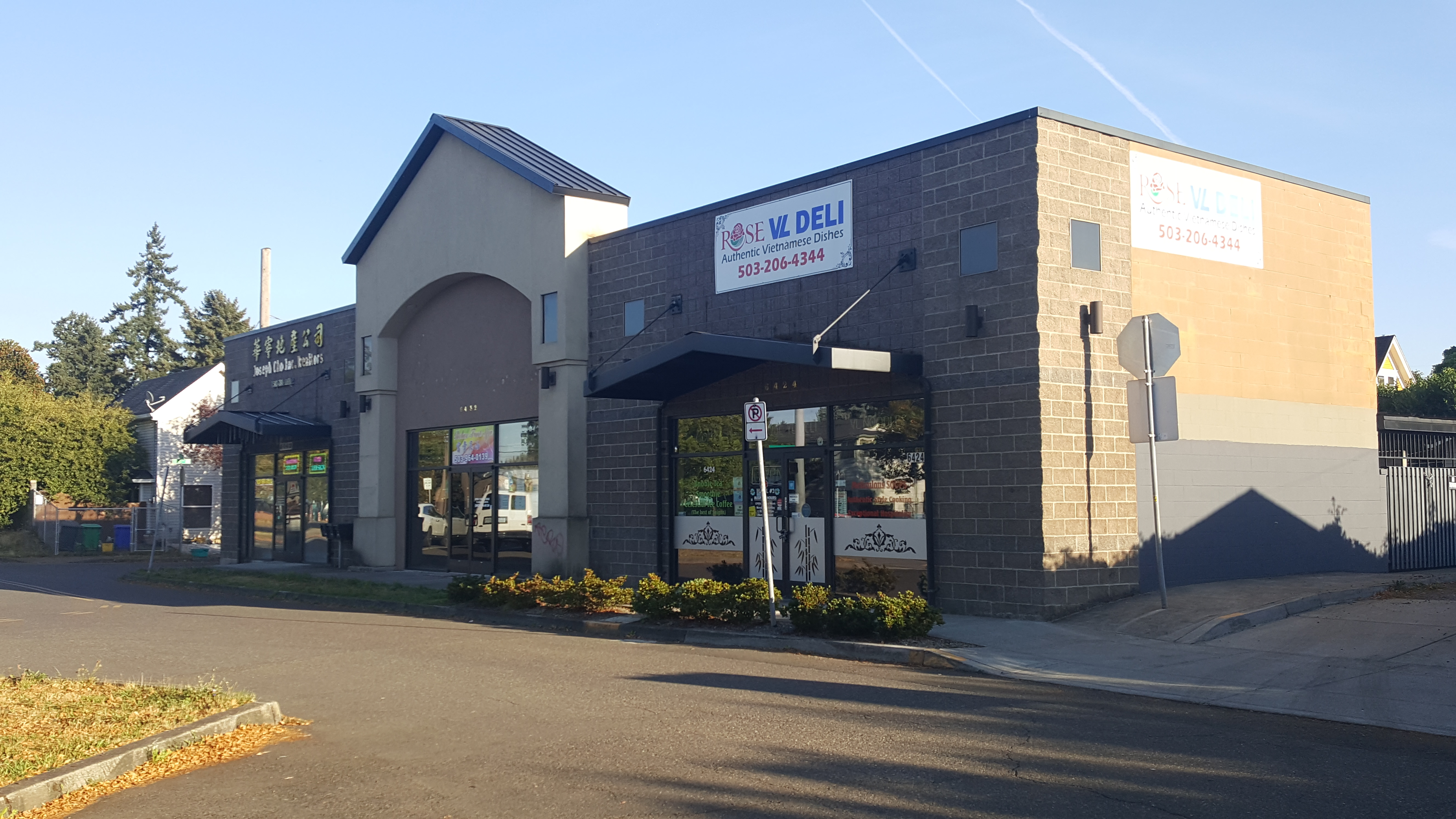
The restaurant is located in a strip mall (pictured in 2021)

Rose VL Deli was named the city's best soup shop in Portland Monthly's 2015 list of the best new restaurants. The magazine also included the cao lȃ̀u in a 2022 list of the twelve best breakfasts in the city. Writers for Portland Monthly included the cao lau in a 2025 list of the city's "most iconic" dishes.

In 2018, Eater Portland's Brooke Jackson-Glidden called Rose VL Deli the city's best Vietnamese restaurant. In 2019, the website's Nick Woo called the cao lầu "iconic" and wrote: "The heady stew of wonderfully contrasting textures and flavors has earned this place many regulars." He also included the chicken curry soup in Eater Portland's 2019 list of thirteen "stellar" curries in the city Jackson-Glidden included the restaurant in a 2021 list of Portland's 38 "essential" eateries and the cao lầu in a 2024 overview of "iconic" Portland dishes. She and Mattie John Bamman also included the cao lầu in Eater Portland's 2021 list of the city's fifteen "iconic" dishes and drinks. Rose VL was also included in the website's 2025 list of Portland's best restaurants for mid-week lunches. Paolo Bicchieri included the business in Eater Portland's 2025 overview of the city's best restaurants for lunch.

== See also ==
- List of Vietnamese restaurants
