= Annam VL =

Vietnamese restaurant in Portland, Oregon, U.S.

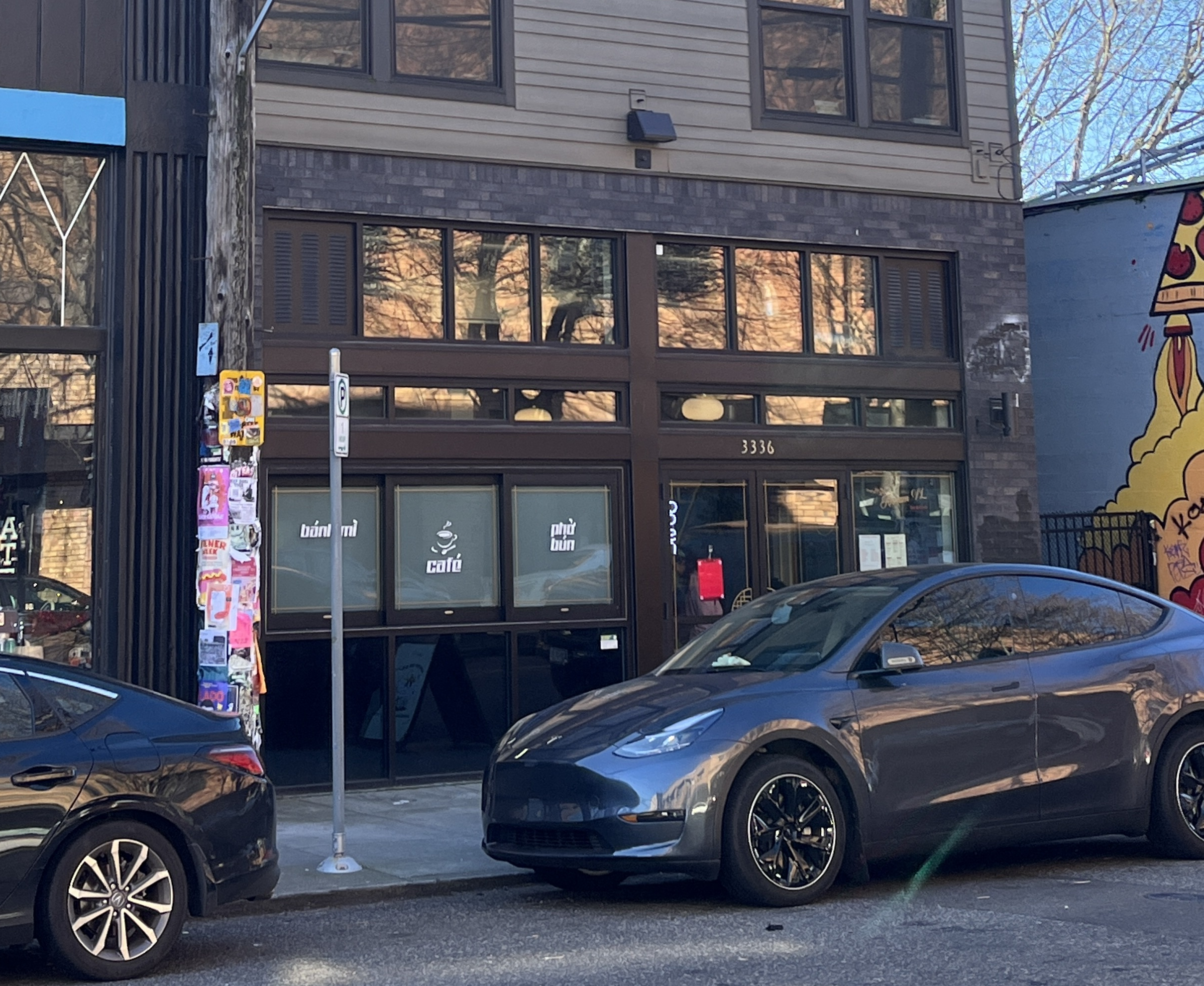
- The restaurant's exterior in 2025
- Interactive map of Annam VL

Restaurant information
- Food type: Vietnamese
- Location: 3336 Southeast Belmont Street, Portland, Multnomah, Oregon, 97214, United States
- Coordinates: 45°30′59″N 122°37′48″W

Annam VL is a Vietnamese restaurant in Portland, Oregon, United States. Established in 2023, the business is operated by the family behind local eateries Ha VL and Rose VL Deli.

== Description ==
The Vietnamese restaurant Annam VL operates on Belmont Street in southeast Portland, serving soups and other dishes, including street food.

== History ==
Operated by the family behind Ha VL (2004) and Rose VL Deli, Annam VL opened on November 4, 2023, in the space previously occupied by defunct restaurant Batterfish.

== Reception ==
Janey Wong and Krista Garcia included Annam VL in Eater Portland's 2023 overview of recommended eateries in the city for pho. Garcia and Nick Woo included the business in a 2024 list of the city's seventeen "finest" Vietnamese restaurants. Time Out's 2024 overview of the best cities for food included Portland and said the more affordable restaurants Annam VL and Ki'ikibáa make the city "stand out", according to KOIN. The business was included in Time Out Portland's 2025 list of the city's eighteen best restaurants.

== See also ==
- List of Vietnamese restaurants
