= Matta (restaurant) =

Vietnamese restaurant in Portland, Oregon, U.S.

- Interactive map of Matta

Restaurant information
- Food type: Vietnamese
- Location: Portland, Oregon, United States
- Coordinates: 45°33′20.4″N 122°37′9.1″W
- Website: mattapdx.com

Matta is a Vietnamese restaurant in Portland, Oregon.

== History ==
Matta began serving "Vietnamese soul food" from a food cart in 2018. During the COVID-19 pandemic, owner Richard Le offered free meals to food industry workers who became unemployed after Oregon banned indoor dining, as well as hospital workers.

In 2023, Matta stopped operating from a food cart and re-opened in Lil' Dame.

== Reception ==
Krista Garcia of Eater Portland included Matta in a 2020 list of "Portland's Top Pandan Treats". The website's Alex Frane included the restaurant in a 2021 overview of "17 Spots to Grab Amazing Breakfast Sandwiches". Nick Woo and Brooke Jackson-Glidden included Matta in Eater Portland's 2021 "Guide to Portland's Most Outstanding Food Carts". Jackson-Glidden also included Matta in a 2021 overview of "Where to Find Weekend Brunch in Portland" and a 2022 list of "The 38 Essential Restaurants and Food Carts in Portland". Portland Monthly included the breakfast sandwich in a 2022 list of "The 12 Best Breakfasts in Portland".

In 2023, chef Richard Văn Lê was one of 18 Portland industry professionals deemed "rising stars" by the restaurant resource and trade publication StarChefs.

== See also ==
- List of Vietnamese restaurants
