= Mama Đút =

Vietnamese restaurant in Portland, Oregon, U.S.

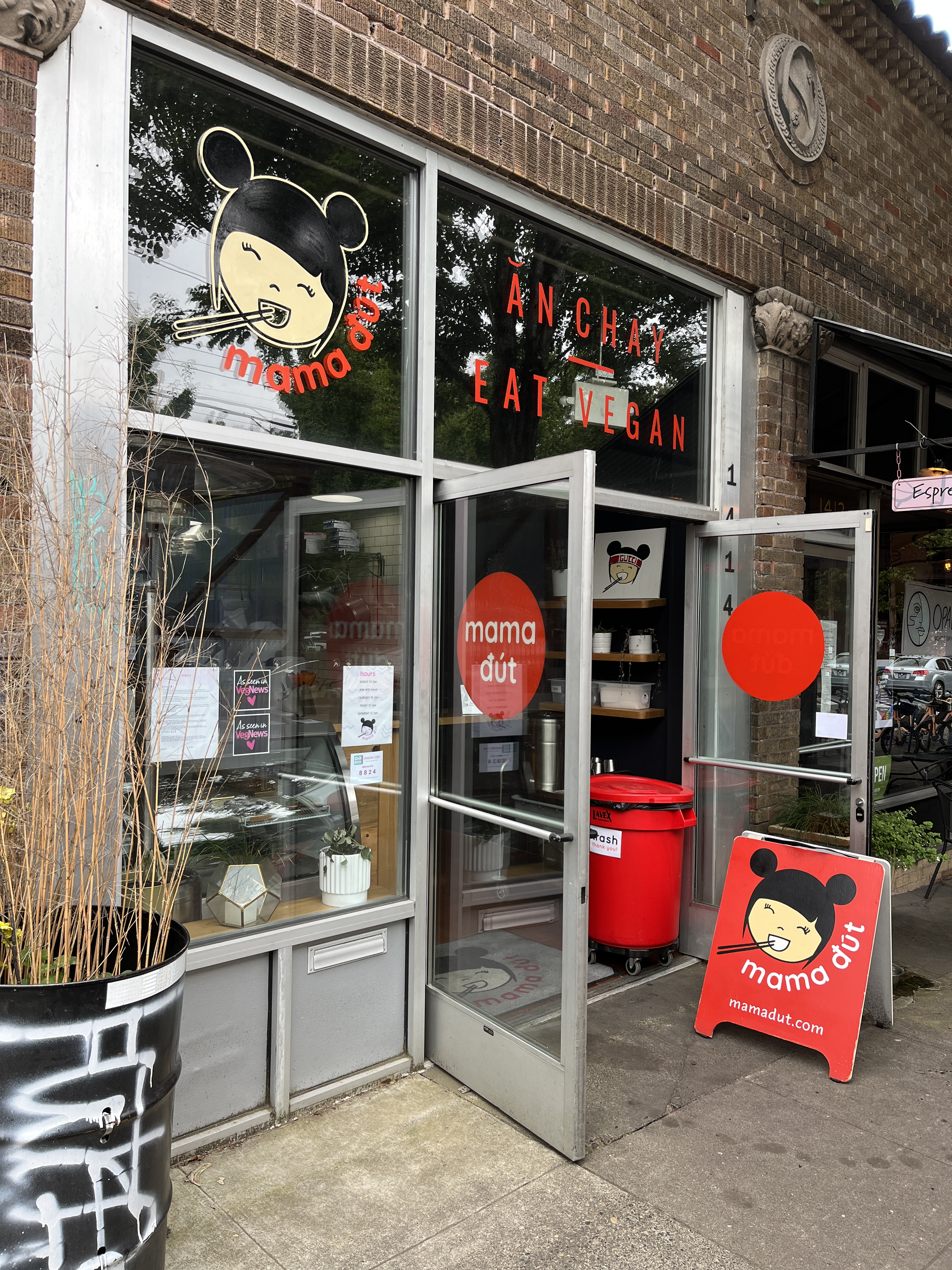
- Exterior of the restaurant in southeast Portland's Buckman neighborhood, 2022
- Interactive map of Mama Đút

Restaurant information
- Established: November 2020
- Owner: Thuy Pham
- Food type: Vegan; Vietnamese
- Location: 1414 Southeast Morrison Street, Portland, Oregon, 97214, United States
- Coordinates: 45°31′1.5″N 122°39′4.2″W
- Website: mamadut.com

Mama Đút (sometimes Mama Đút Foods) was a vegan restaurant serving Vietnamese cuisine in Portland, Oregon.

== Description ==
Mama Đút was a vegan restaurant serving Vietnamese cuisine in southeast Portland's Buckman neighborhood. The menu included rice waffles with scallions and jackfruit, bánh mì with mock pork belly, and fried mushroom bao buns with kimchi aioli. Dessert options included strawberry lychee cheesecake, ube cinnamon rolls, pandan whoopie pies, and multiple varieties of limeades, including passion fruit and Thai tea.

== History ==
Mama Đút was established by owner Thuy Pham in November 2020. In 2021, the business announced plans to open a second location in the Alberta Arts District in collaboration with the vegan Cuban restaurant Miami Nice.

The restaurant was featured on the Netflix series Street Food in 2022. In October 2023, Pham announced plans to close the Buckman restaurant on November 19. She also confirmed that the planned second location would not come to fruition. She wrote:

I started Mama Dut 3 years ago with just $500 and the hope that people would like my food. Little did I know, y'all would show up for my food in a way that healed my heart. Growing up as a Vietnamese refugee, I often felt ashamed of the food my family cooked. Lunches my mom made often went in the trash because of the shame. Decades later, I've found lots of healing thru seeing everyone show up at Mama Dut. The stories & experiences everyone has shared with me along with all the opportunities that came from opening Mama Dut, is a blessing I will always carry in my heart.

== Reception ==
In 2022, Pham was nominated for a James Beard Foundation Award, in the "emerging chef" category. Waz Wu included the restaurant in Eater Portland's 2023 list of fifteen "essential" vegan and vegetarian restaurants in Portland.

== See also ==
- List of vegetarian and vegan restaurants
- List of Vietnamese restaurants
