= Portland Cà Phê =

Coffee shop in Portland, Oregon, U.S.

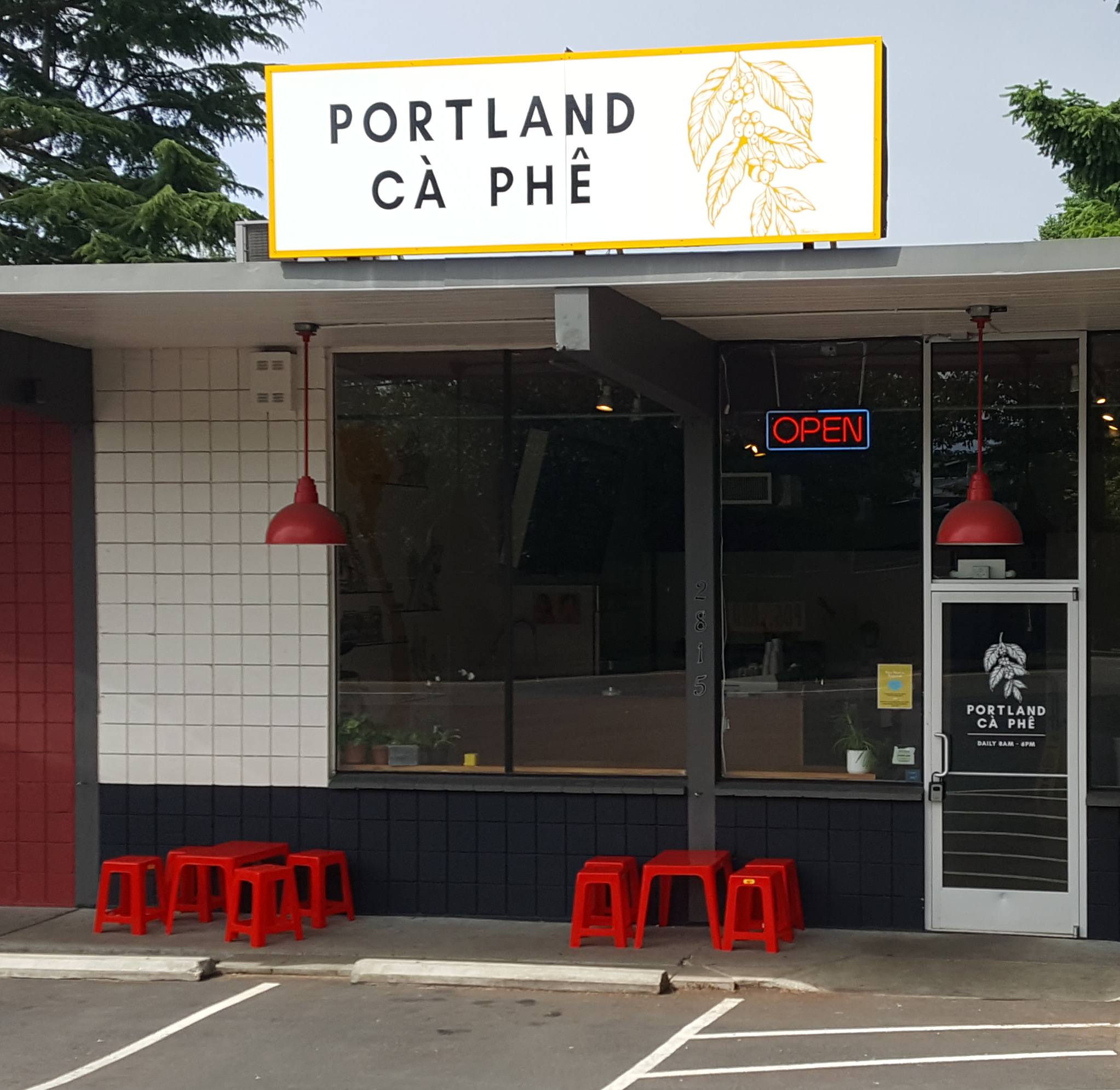
- The restaurant's exterior in 2021
- Interactive map of Portland Cà Phê

Restaurant information
- Food type: Vietnamese
- Location: 2815 Southeast Holgate Boulevard; 2601 Northeast Martin Luther King Jr. Boulevard, Portland, Multnomah, Oregon, United States
- Coordinates: 45.4905°N 122.6372°W
- Website: portlandcaphe.com

Portland Cà Phê (Vietnamese: "Portland Coffee") is a coffee shop with two locations in Portland, Oregon. The business specializes in Vietnamese coffee drinks, including robusta coffee and Vietnamese iced coffee, and also serves bánh mì and pastries.

After roasting robusta coffee beans as a hobby starting in 2020, Kimberly Dam opened the first brick and mortar location in southeast Portland in April 2021. A second location opened in northeast Portland in October 2022.

== Description ==
Portland Cà Phê is a coffee shop with locations in southeast Portland's Creston-Kenilworth neighborhood and the northeast Portland part of the Eliot neighborhood. Drinks on the menu include Vietnamese iced coffee, rose matcha, and an ube latte with ube root extract.

According to Willamette Week's Andrea Damewood, Portland Cà Phê is among the few Portland establishments serving cheese foam (blended whipped cream, cream cheese, and sea salt). She called the business "a low-key second outpost" of House of Banh Mi, a Vietnamese restaurant owned by the mother of Portland Cà Phê's owner. The coffee shop serves bánh mì with House of Banh Mi's "signature" egg butter, pickled carrots and daikon, cilantro, cucumber, and jalapeño. Coffee cinnamon rolls and "pastry pop tarts" from Jen's Bagels and Pastries are also available.

== History ==
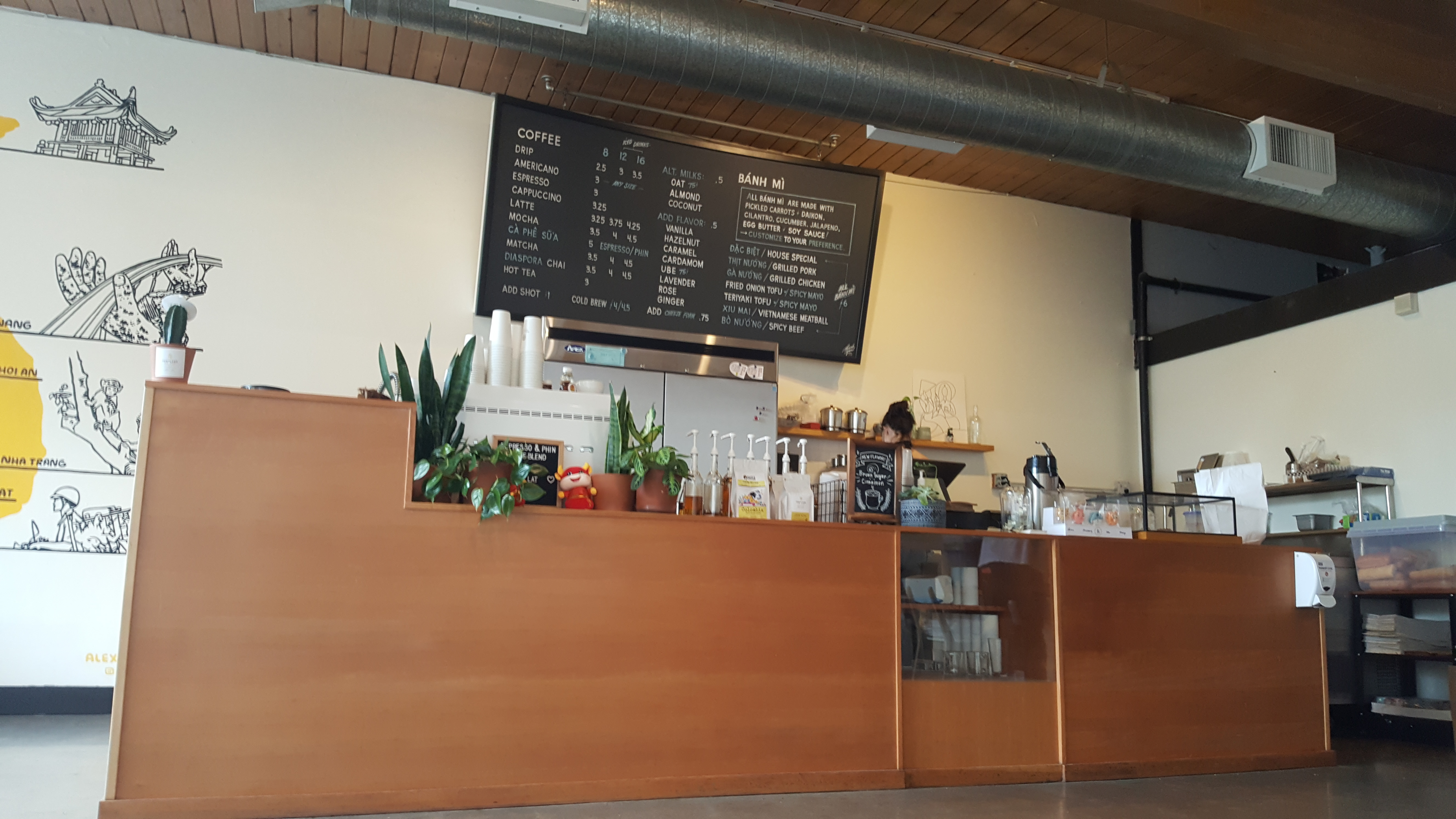
Interior counter

Owner Kimberly Dam established Portland Cà Phê during the COVID-19 pandemic. In 2020, she began roasting Vietnamese robusta coffee as a hobby, then supplying beans to House of Banh Mi as well as the food carts Mama Đút and Matta. Dam fully opened the storefront on April 23, 2021, after operating with limited hours on April 17 and 18. Portland Cà Phê's two bean importers fell behind local demand because of supply chain issues related to the pandemic.

In 2022, Dam announced plans to open a second location in at the intersection of Martin Luther King Jr. Boulevard and Northeast Russell Street. The shop opened on October 29.

Portland Cà Phê offered specials for Lunar New Year in 2025.

== Reception ==
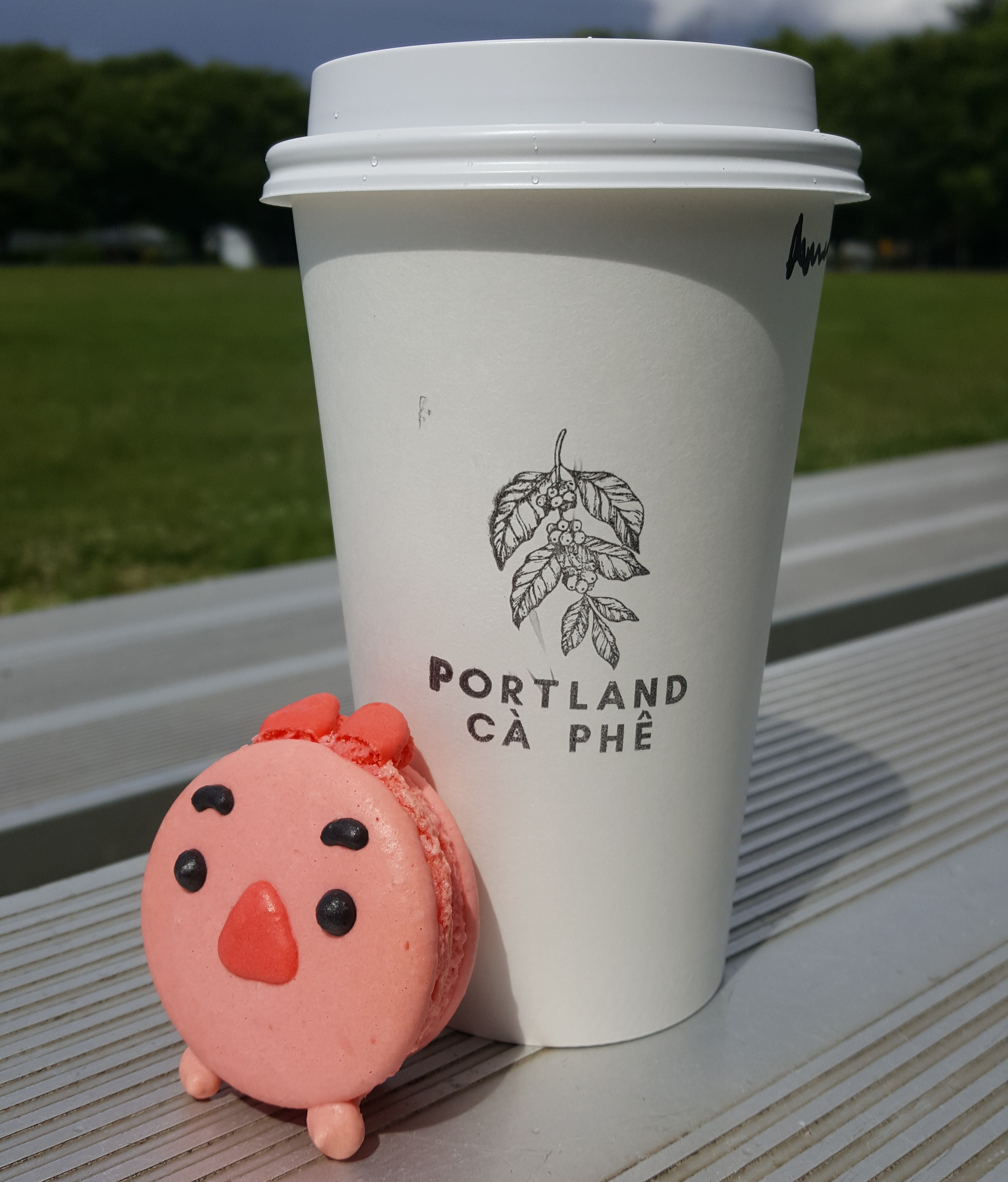
Coffee and macaroon

In May 2021, Willamette Week's Andrea Damewood said Portland Cà Phê "highlights the versatility of Vietnamese coffee beans, offering well-balanced drinks" and said the Vietnamese iced coffee is "just the right amount of sweet and strong". She called the fried onion tofu bánh mì "a standout" and wrote:

Portland Cà Phê opened less than a month ago, but its signature drinks have already managed to become iconic—or at least ubiquitous Instagram fodder. If you follow the Portland food scene, you've surely seen what's already become a signature snap of the Southeast Holgate coffee shop on your socials: a perfect purple ube latte held aloft in front of a wall-sized map of Vietnam. It's a photo-friendly drink, sure. But it's also as delicious as it looks.

Nick Woo and Krista Garcia included Portland Cà Phê in Eater Portland's 2021 list of the city's "mind-blowing" Vietnamese restaurants and food carts. Katrina Yentch included the business in the website's 2022 list of eighteen "knockout spots for affordable dining" the city. Nathan Williams included Portland Cà Phê in a 2023 overview of recommended eateries in the Creston-Kenilworth neighborhood. The business was also included in the website's 2025 list of Portland's best affordable restaurants.
