= Lunar New Year in Portland, Oregon =

Annual celebration in Portland

Lunar New Year is celebrated annually in the American city of Portland, Oregon. Cultural institutions like the Lan Su Chinese Garden and the Portland Chinatown Museum host activities such as dragon and lion dances as well as lantern viewings. The city has also seen Lunar New Year celebrations and performances at Keller Auditorium and the Oregon Convention Center, and many restaurants offer specials. Portland has hosted events specific to Chinese New Year and the Vietnamese holiday Tết, and the city is home to multiple lion dance teams that perform throughout the region.

== Events and activities ==
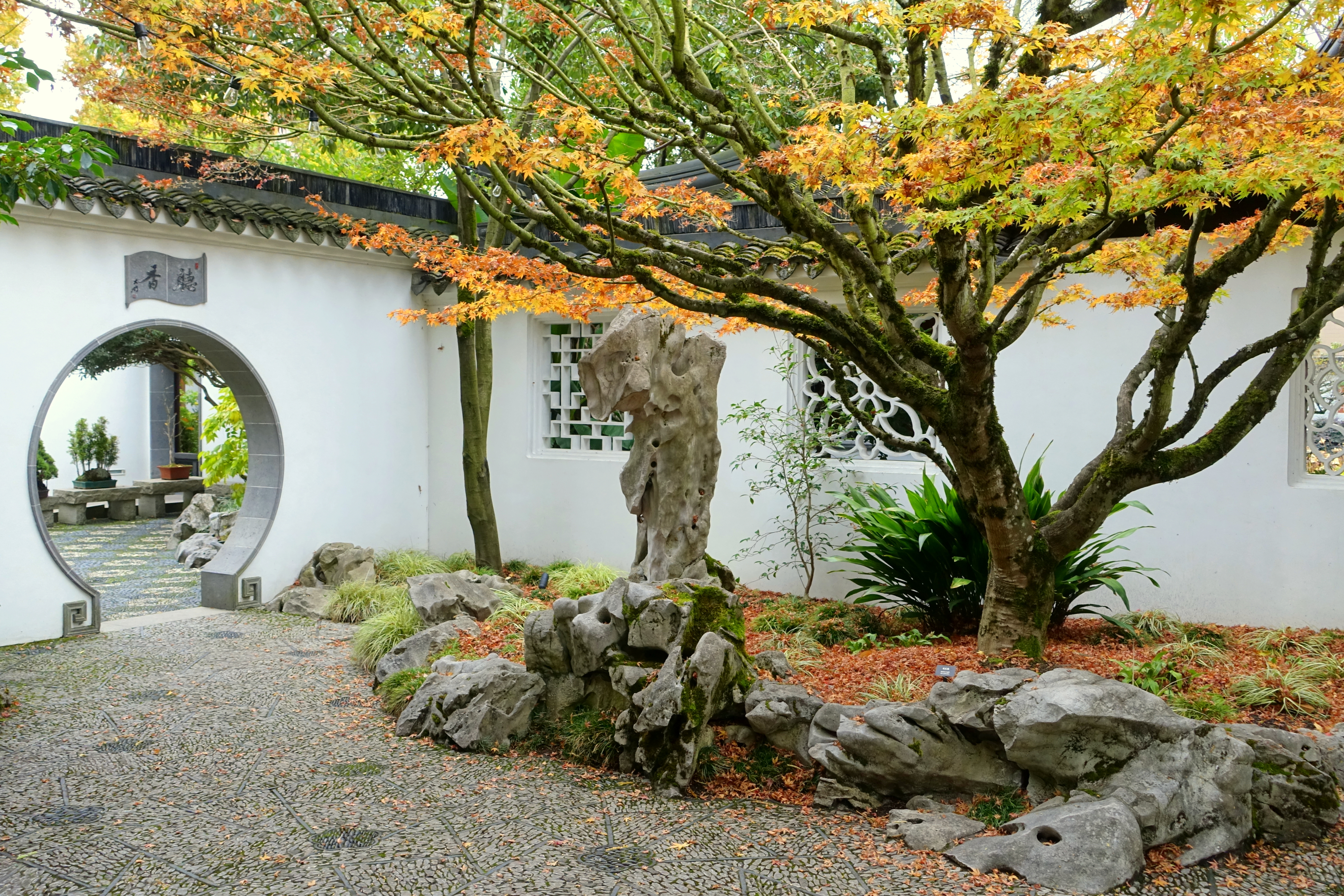
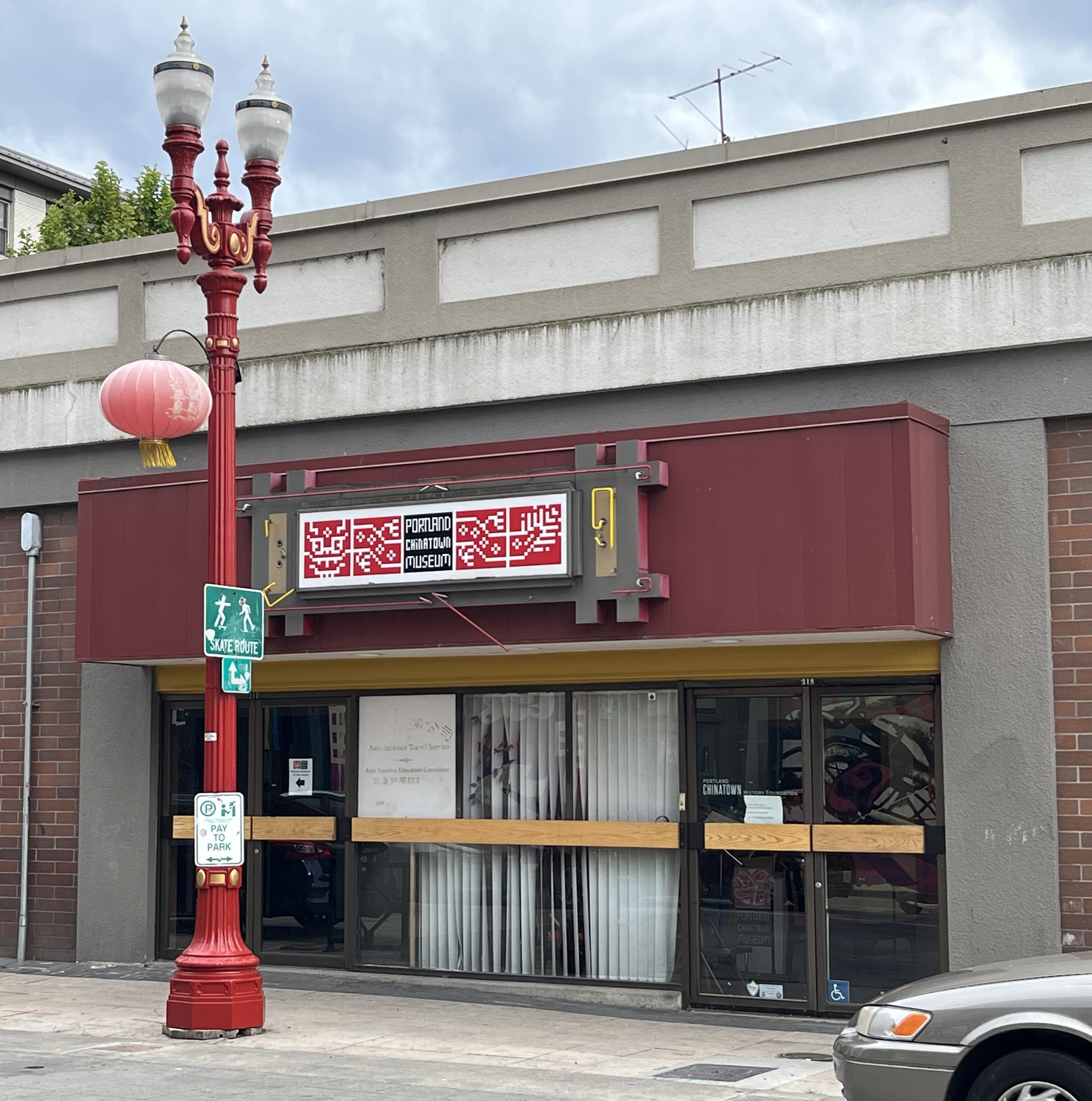
The Lan Su Chinese Garden (top) and the Portland Chinatown Museum (bottom) host Lunar New Year celebrations annually.

Hosts in various locations, including the Lan Su Chinese Garden, organize Lunar New Year celebrations annually. The two-week event in 2021 featured nightly lantern viewings and sculptures, including a phoenix imported from China and gifted to the garden. In addition to lion dances and lantern viewings, the 2023 event presented cultural and martial arts performances by the Portland Chinese Dance Troupe and the Vancouver Jasmine Dance Troupe. The 2025 event saw musicians perform the Chinese song "Misty Rain Sings Yangzhou" and the Portland Chinese Dance Troupe perform a scene from the drama "Zhaojun Departs for the Frontier". To commemorate the Year of the Snake, the event also had a bearded dragon, boa constrictors, and "meet and greets" with the God of Wealth. To ring in the Year of the Fire Horse in 2026, the garden hosted similar activities and a miniature horse.

The Portland Chinatown Museum hosts an annual dragon dance parade and celebration. The seventh parade in 2023, in collaboration with the Oregon Historical Society, was in downtown Portland and the Old Town Chinatown neighborhood. It also featured dragon and lion dancing. The 2024 collaboration included the Portland Trail Blazers' Rip City Crew, and the parade route proceeded through a pass under the Chinatown Gateway.

The Lunar New Year Gala at Keller Auditorium is organized by the Chinese Friendship Association of Portland. It is "billed as Oregon's most prestigious and authentic Asian cultural event", according to The Oregonian. The 2023 event featured singers and magic shows. The 2024 program included "Sichuan Opera face-changing artist, Wushu champions, rhythmic gymnastics team, and a variety of culture performances", according to The Oregonian. The 2025 program included 300 performers, including comedian and talk show host Joe Wong, a "dance retelling" of the story of Wang Zhaojun, Korean Nanta drumming dance, martial artists, the Peony Flower Dance, and rhythmic gymnasts.

In 2012, approximately 200 Bhutanese immigrants celebrated Lunar New Year at the Mt. Scott Community Center. Boys performed Indian pop songs, and girls performed traditional folk dances. Lincoln High School's Asian Student Union hosted a Lunar New Year festival in 2024. The Portland Chinese School had a Lunar New Year party in 2026.

=== Chinese New Year ===
The Chinese New Year Cultural Fair is organized by the Portland Chinese Times, the Portland Art & Cultural Center, and the Oregon Chinese Consolidated Benevolent Association. The annual Chinese New Year celebration is held at the Oregon Convention Center (OCC). It has featured calligraphy, Chinese folk dances, martial arts demonstrations, games, and lion dances. Thousands of people attend the event annually, according to KGW.

=== Tết ===
In 2012, the OCC hosted a celebration of the Vietnamese holiday Tết (Vietnamese New Year). The event featured a beauty pageant, lion dances, and musical performances. The Vietnamese Student Association at Portland State University hosted its twenty-third annual Culture Show at the Smith Memorial Student Union in 2024; the event has been described as "a celebration of the Lunar New Year" and Tết. In 2025, the Vietnamese Community of Oregon hosted a Tết celebration at Leodis V. McDaniel High School. The event had "a mix of cultural performances, community activities and entertainment for all ages, including traditional dances, a medical fair, live music, a fashion show, and cultural performances by students and community groups", according to The Oregonian.

== Food ==
Many local restaurants offer themed foods. In 2023, Janey Wong of Eater Portland wrote, "During Lunar New Year, Portland's Asian communities gather and celebrate the holiday with traditional foods such as the Chinese nian gao (sweet glutinous rice cake), Vietnamese bánh tét (glutinous rice with mung bean and pork), and Korean tteokguk (sliced rice cake soup), which are often made at home." Wong recommended the Filipino bakery Shop Halo Halo's variety boxes, which included black sesame and ube mooncakes, sugar cookies with matcha, calamansi–lavender shortbread, and taro buns, as well as the Lunar New Year doughnut boxes created as a collaboration between Delicious Donuts and the Vietnamese restaurant Matta. The boxes included pandan doughnuts, raised doughnuts, and red envelopes. The Sports Bra, a women's sports bar, hosted a Lunar New Year celebration with food and drink specials; the event benefited the Asian Pacific American Network of Oregon. The bakery Twisted Croissant has sold cha siu bao (barbecued pork) croissants for Lunar New Year. The defunct Vietnamese restaurant Mama Đút offered specials celebrating Tết in 2023.

In 2024, Delicious Donuts partnered with artist Mike Bennett on special Tét boxes for the Year of the Dragon. The restaurant Friendship Kitchen served bánh tét for Tết, and the doughnut shop HeyDay sold both bánh tét and bánh tét chuối at Kolectivo's Lunar New Year event. In 2025, Delicious Donuts special box of doughnuts includes red envelopes and snake stickers by Bennett. The Tết event at Kolectivo in 2025 was organized by the teams behind HeyDay, Matta, Mémoire Cà Phê, and Portland Cà Phê, as well as the Vietnamese restaurant Annam VL. Separately, Portland Cà Phê offered Lunar New Year specials, including Earl Grey matcha, an iced lychee–rose matcha drink, an iced rose cold foam vanilla bean latte, and an iced salted einspänner latte. The Vietnamese restaurant The Paper Bridge offered a special five-course meal. SF Supermarket on 82nd Avenue hosted the Lunar New Year Food Fest in 2025. Departure Restaurant and Lounge, Hale Pele, and Jade Rabbit were among restaurants with special menus in 2026.

== Lion dancing ==
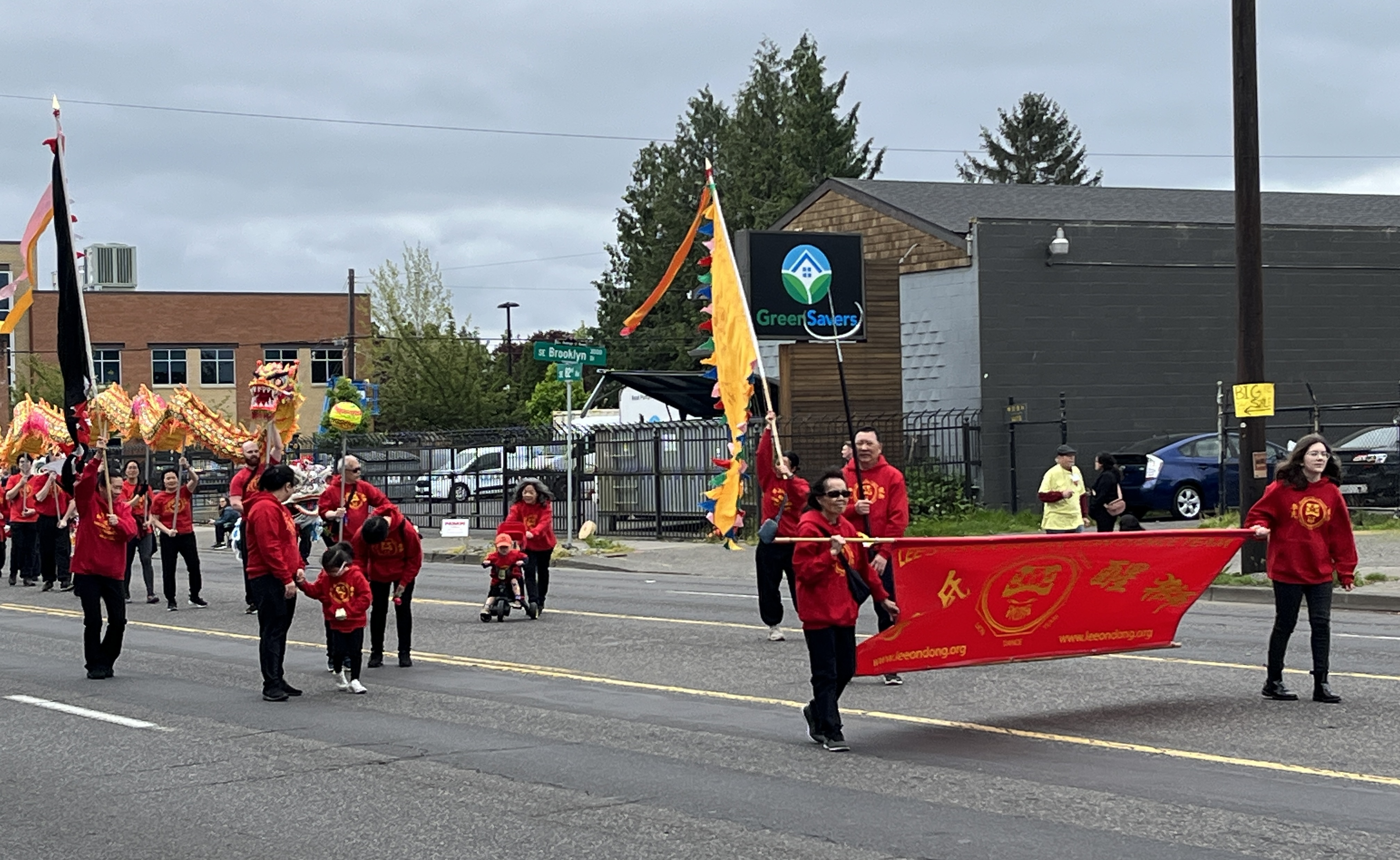
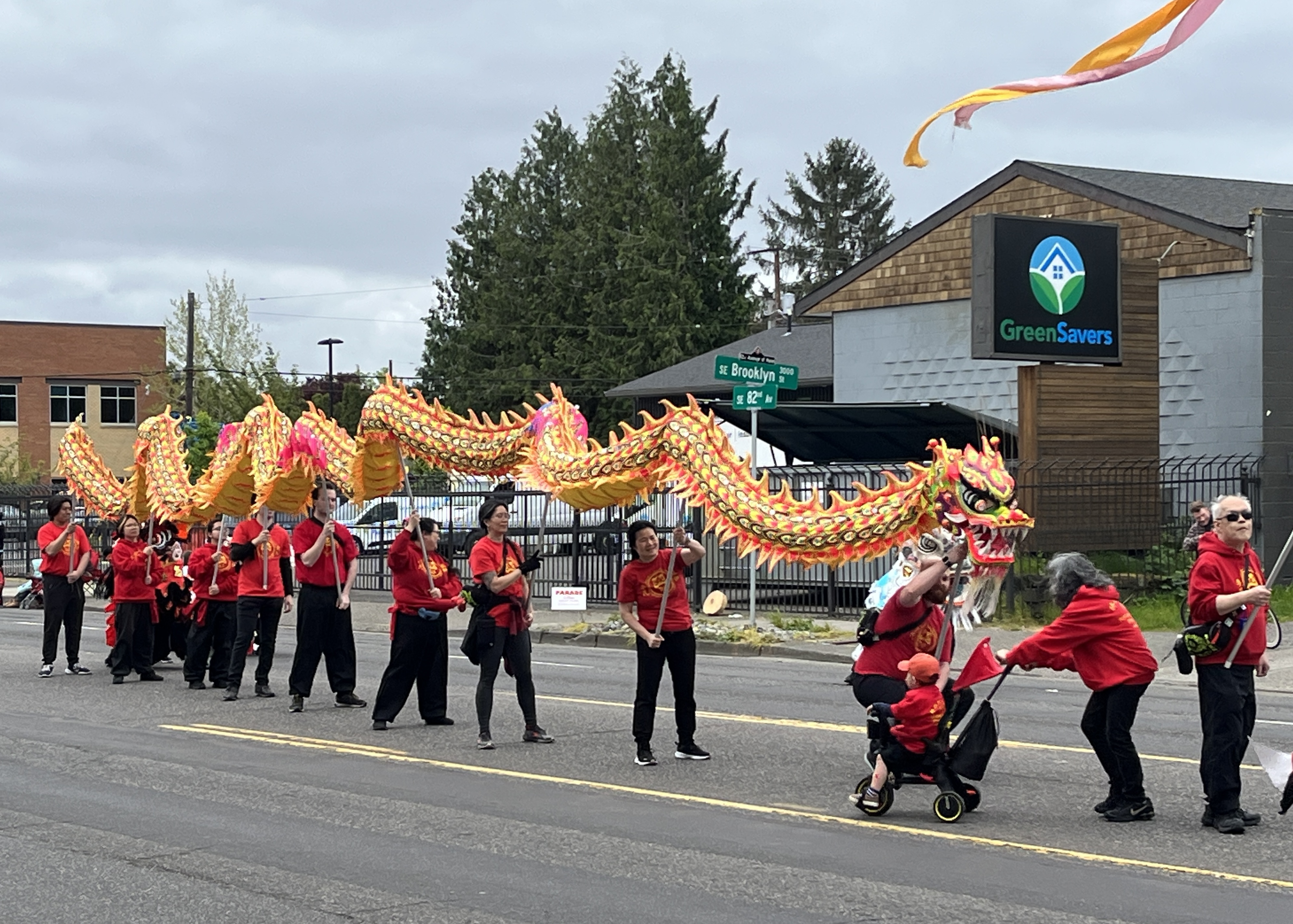
Dragon dance at the 82nd Avenue of Roses Parade in 2025; the city of Portland, Oregon often sees dragon and lion dances during annual Lunar New Year celebrations.

Lunar New Year celebrations often feature lion dancing. Portland is home to many lion dance teams. As of 2022, Nhan Danh and Nick Lee coached White Lotus Dragon and Lion Dance and Portland Lee's Association Dragon & Lion Dance, respectively. The groups perform at businesses and cultural centers across Oregon and Washington. Portland Lee's Association has performed at Lan Su Chinese Garden for approximately 20 years.

In 2024, KGW said the Portland Chinatown History Foundation's eighth annual Lunar New Year Dragon Dance and Parade featured the White Lotus Dragon and Lion Dance team, the International Lion Dance team, and the Portland Lee's Association Dragon and Lion Dance team."

=== White Lotus Dragon and Lion Dance ===
Danh founded White Lotus Dragon and Lion Dance in 2015. In 2021, he founded the White Lotus Foundation as an umbrella organization for the team and to expand activities. The team started with 11 members and expanded to 53 members by 2023. In 2023, Samantha Swindler of The Oregonian said of the team, "Over four weeks, throughout the Lunar New Year season, they'll perform close to 80 shows, ranging from small, two-lion affairs to full productions that involve drums, firecrackers and a 10-person dragon... Clients hire the team to perform at events such as business openings and Lunar New Year celebrations, including Chinese New Year events and the Vietnamese celebration of Tết. Last year, the team even performed at a gender reveal."

The owner of the Chinese restaurant Mama Chow's Kitchen has invited lion dancers, including the White Lotus team, "to perform in front of the cart every year to bless it for Chinese New Year", according to KOIN. In 2023, the team's performance schedule included the Chinese restaurant HK Cafe, the Vietnamese restaurant Lúc Lắc Vietnamese Kitchen, Portland International Airport, and The Sports Bra, among other Portland locations.

== See also ==
- Culture of Portland, Oregon
- History of Chinese Americans in Portland, Oregon
- New Year in the Park
