= Thomas Mann Building =

Historic building in Portland, Oregon, U.S.

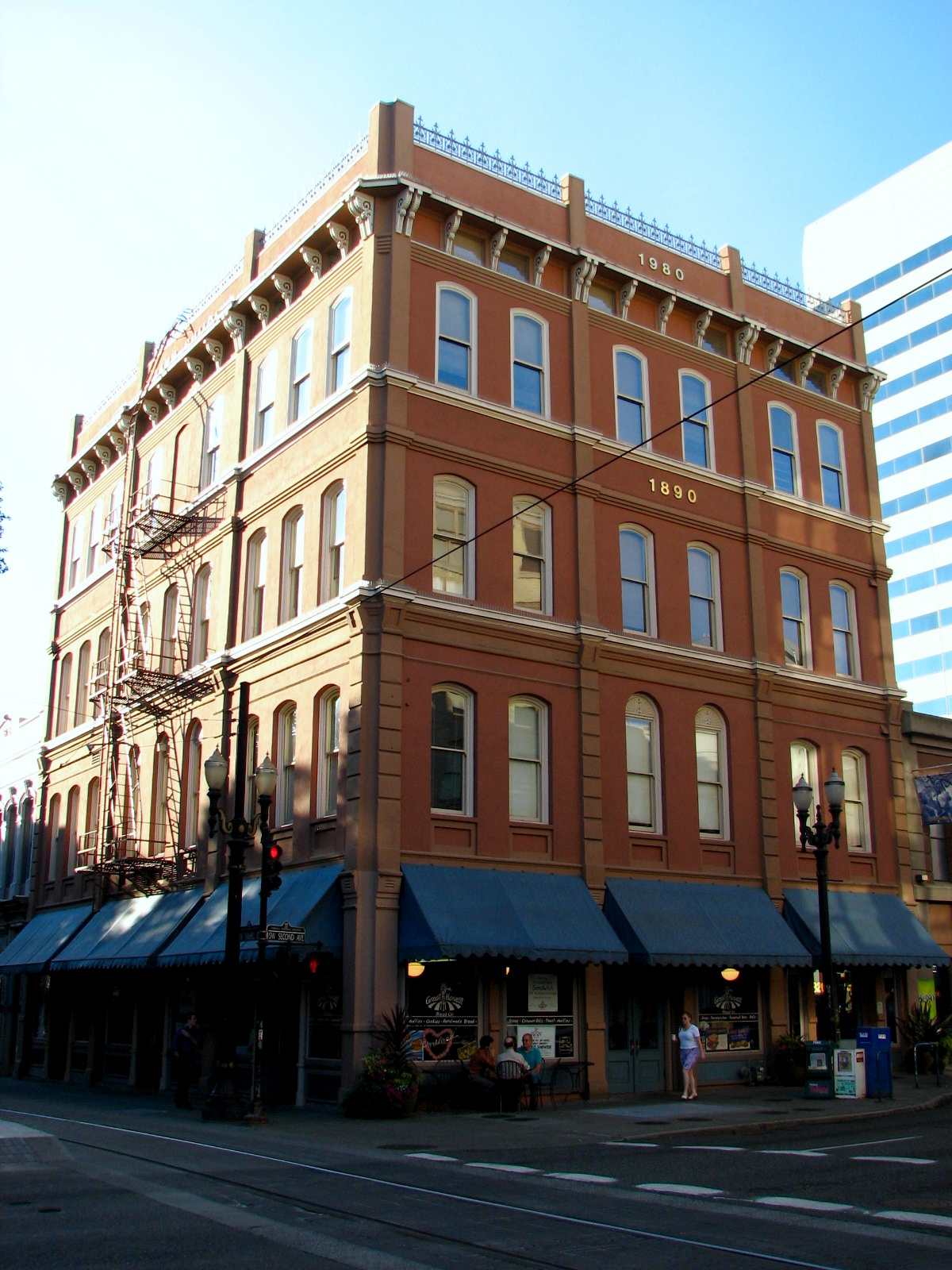
- The building's exterior in 2008
- Interactive map of the Thomas Mann Building area

General information
- Location: Portland, Oregon, United States
- Coordinates: 45°31′1.8″N 122°40′29.1″W

The Thomas Mann Building, completed in 1890, is located in Portland, Oregon's Yamhill Historic District.
