= Franz Building =

Historic building in Portland, Oregon, U.S.

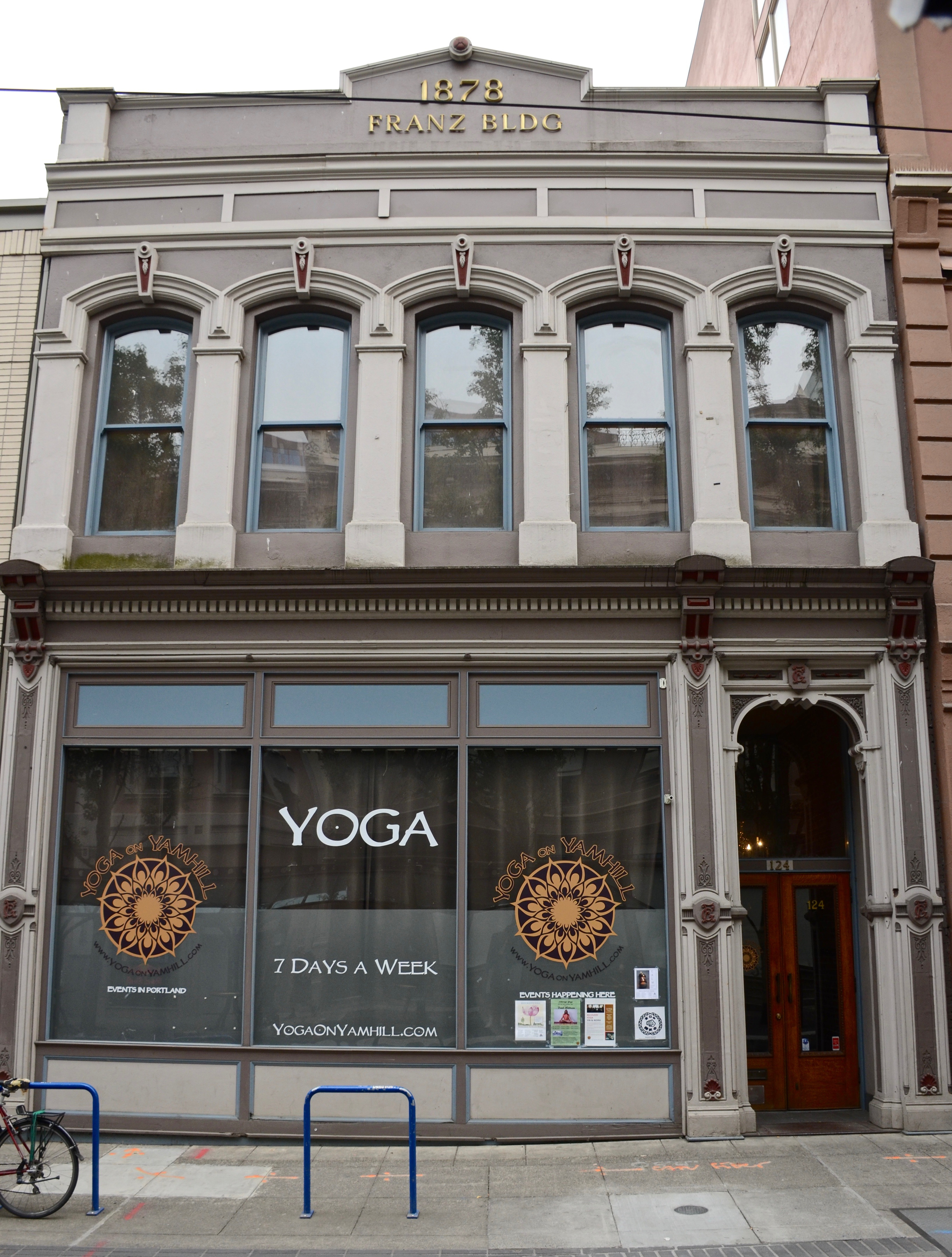
- The building's exterior in 2017
- Interactive map of the Franz Building area

General information
- Location: Portland, Oregon, United States
- Coordinates: 45°31′1.6″N 122°40′28.4″W

The Franz Building is an historic building in Portland, Oregon's Yamhill Historic District. The structure was completed in 1878.
