= Mikado Block =

Historic building in Portland, Oregon, U.S.

- U.S. Historic district – Contributing property
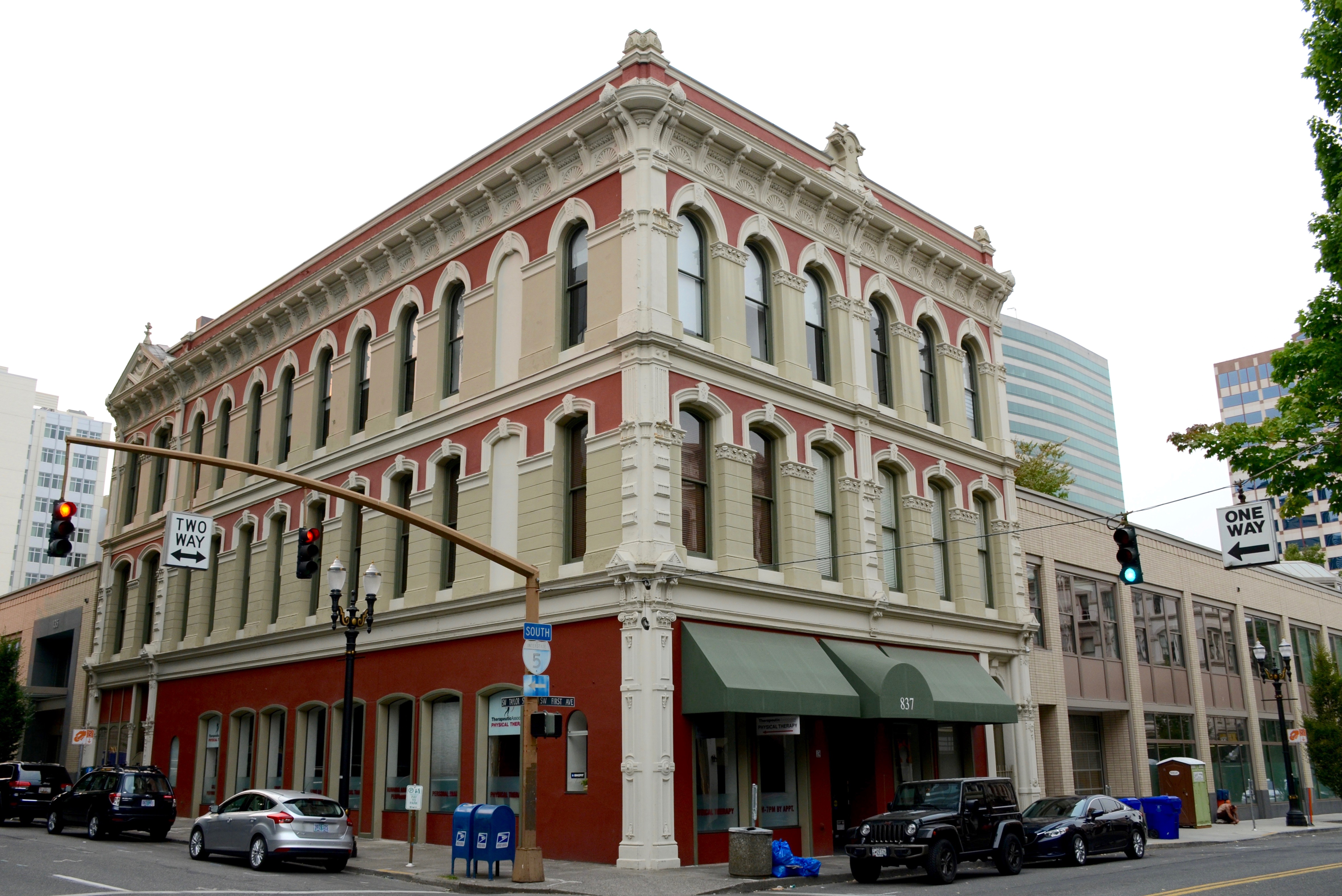
- The building's exterior in 2017

- Location within Portland, Oregon
- Location: Portland, Oregon, U.S.
- Coordinates: 45°30′59.9″N 122°40′28.4″W
- Built: 1880
- Architectural style: High Victorian Italianate
- Part of: Portland Yamhill Historic District (ID76001587)
- Designated CP: July 30, 1976

The Mikado Block, also known as the Mikado Building, is an historic building in Portland, Oregon. The 1880 structure is part of the Portland Yamhill Historic District, which is listed on the National Register of Historic Places. The first floor, which has been heavily remodeled, was originally occupied by an Olds & King department store.
