= Lúc Lắc Vietnamese Kitchen =

Vietnamese restaurant in Portland, Oregon, U.S.

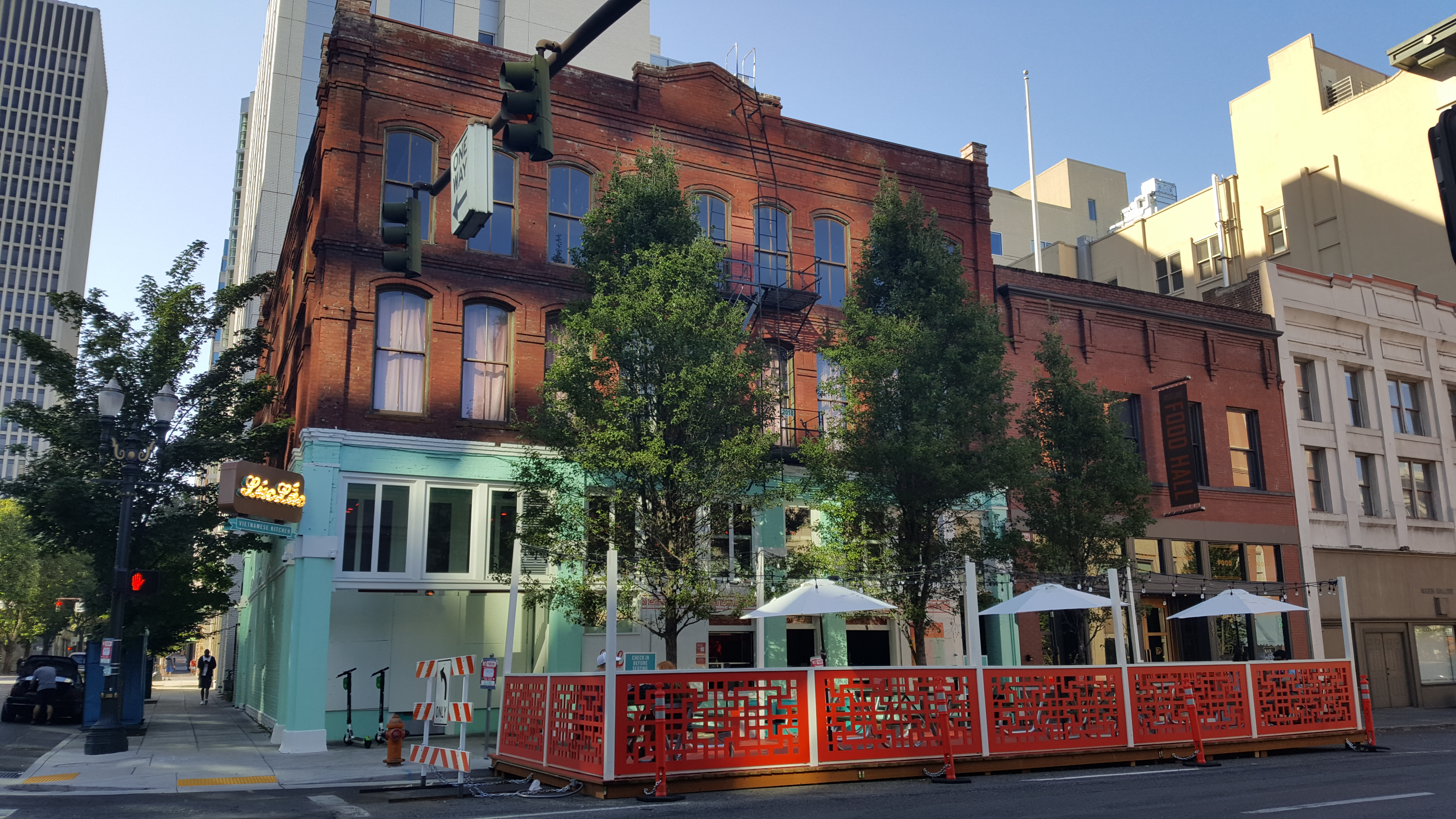
- The restaurant's exterior in August 2020
- Interactive map of Lúc Lắc Vietnamese Kitchen

Restaurant information
- Established: November 2011
- Owners: Adam Ho; Alan "VĐ" Ho
- Food type: Vietnamese
- Location: 835 Southwest 2nd Avenue, Portland, Multnomah, Oregon, 97204, United States
- Coordinates: 45.5169°N 122.6754°W
- Website: luclackitchen.com

Lúc Lắc Vietnamese Kitchen, or simply Lúc Lắc, is a Vietnamese restaurant in Portland, Oregon's Leon Chung Company Building, in the United States. It opened in 2011 and has garnered a positive reception, especially for its pho and cocktails. Known as one of the city's best options for late night dining, Lúc Lắc was named one of the best Vietnamese restaurants in the United States by Thrillist in 2018.

== Description ==
Lúc Lắc is a counter service style Vietnamese restaurant co-owned by Adam and Alan Ho. It has been described as a "cozy Vietnamese sandwich shop/cocktail bar". In 2012, Willamette Week's Kelly Clarke said of the restaurant's interior: "The decor ... is as delightfully baroque as its drink ingredients. A horseshoe of tall-backed, red-leather banquettes surround a huge oval-shaped wood bar painted bright teal. One entire wall is devoted to a stunning, graffiti-ish mural of capering Chinese dragon heads while a flock of pink parasols hang from the high ceiling. It's a fun, fabulous place to eat and drink, like a long lost Asian set piece from The Umbrellas of Cherbourg." According to Michael Russell of The Oregonian, "Happy hour is more relaxed, with inexpensive Vietnamese appetizers and inventive cocktails served under the pink parasols hanging from the ceiling."

=== Menu ===
Menu options include bánh mì, bo tai chanh, crispy rolls, mussels, pho, steak rolls, and sugarcane shrimp. The restaurant has also served coconut prawns and garlic string beans. The five-spice beef broth is attributed to "our grandmother's secret recipe". The "Sassy Sour" is the restaurant's best selling drink. The "Single Knight" has Four Roses bourbon and pho syrup, and the "Hello & Goodbye" is a rum soda with carbonated coconut water. The "LucLac Lush" has jackfruit, coconut cream, mung bean, and lychee jellies. Ca Phe Cola, beer, and wine are also on the drink menu.

== History ==
The restaurant opened in November 2011, following Pho PDX's rebranding and relocation. Imbibe has described Adam Ho as the restaurant's director of operations.

Lúc Lắc began participating in Amazon's Prime Now service in 2015. During the COVID-19 pandemic, the restaurant had an earlier closing time of 11pm at times. The restaurant was among performance locations for the White Lotus Dragon and Lion Dance team's Lunar New Year celebrations in 2023.

In 2026, Luc Lac Mikado LLC (managed by Alan Ho) purchased the nearby Mikado Building. The business has not reveals plans for the acquisition.

== Reception ==
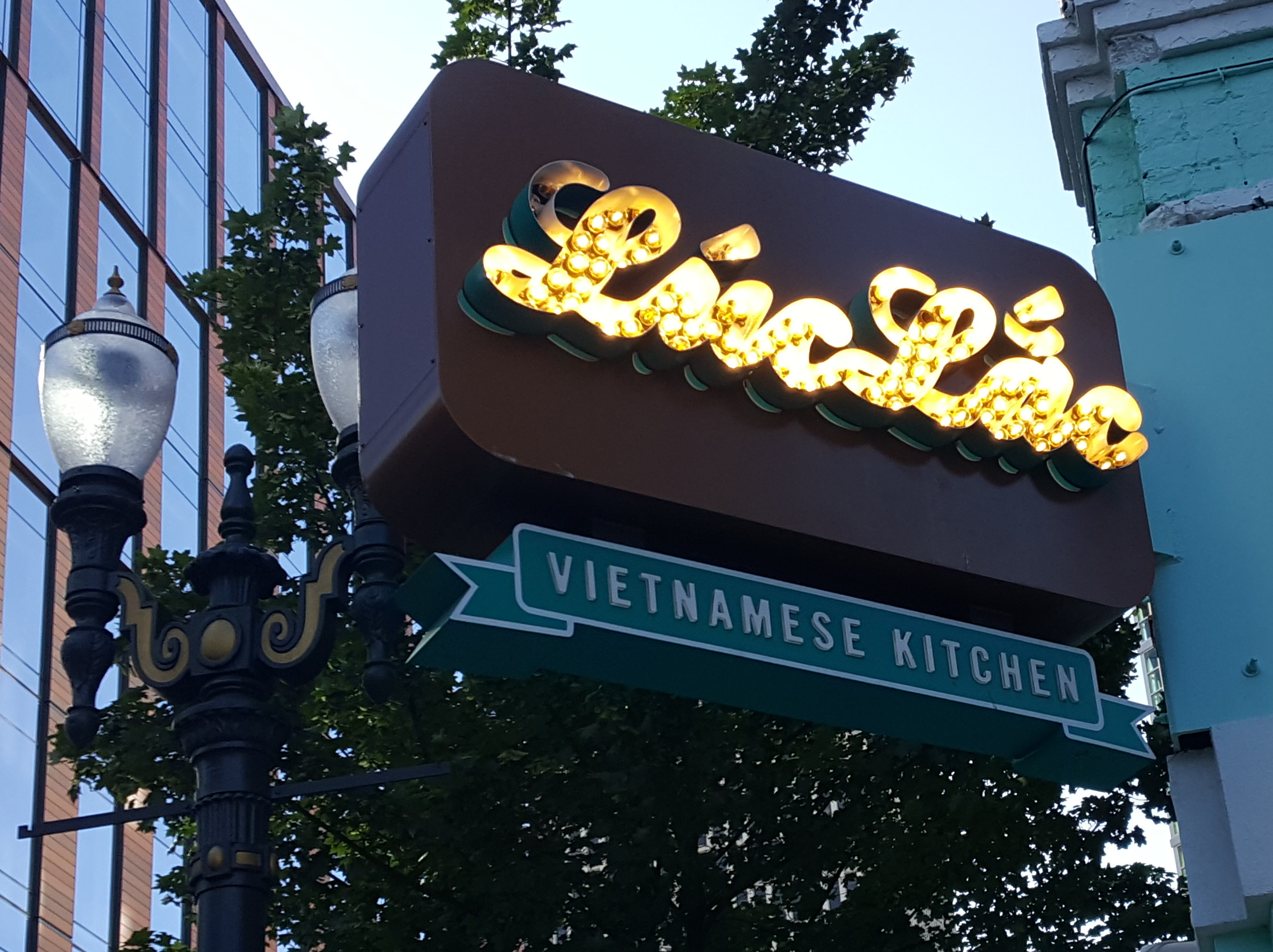
Exterior sign, 2020

Lúc Lắc was included in Bon Appétit's 2012 overview of recommended eateries in Portland. Guide books by Moon Publications recommended the pho and "creative" cocktails", also calling the bánh mì, curries, and vermicelli bowls "excellent". Fodor's guides have described Lúc Lắc as "always-hopping" with "well-executed" cocktails. Readers of The Oregonian ranked Lúc Lắc third for the best pho in the Portland metropolitan area in 2014 and voted the business a "fan favorite" in a 2016 poll of the city's best restaurants for Asian noodle soups. The newspaper's Michael Russell ranked the business number 26 on his 2016 list of "Portland's best late-night eats". Samantha Bakall included the restaurant in a 2016 "ultimate guide" to the best happy hours in downtown Portland. In 2017, readers ranked Lúc Lắc number five in The Oregonian's list of the city's best inexpensive restaurants.

Marjorie Skinner of the Portland Mercury said the restaurant had "what's probably the tastiest pho in town, for carnivores and vegans alike" in 2012. Benjamin Tepler of Portland Monthly said Lúc Lắc "remains the gold standard for seriously late-night eating" in 2013. In 2014, the magazine's Rachel Ritchie said Ho "has grown Luc Lac's bar program into one of the city's most wildly creative cocktail galleries". Portland Monthly's Alex Keith included the business in a 2016 overview of the city's "best bars for late-night eating". Alex Frane recommended the vermicelli bowl in The Daily Meal's 2016 overview of the best of each noodle type in Portland. Frane opined, "The banh mi and pho bowls are solid, but we prefer the vermicelli bowls, especially after we've been out to the downtown bars. The honey glazed chicken and the BBQ fried pork sausage are our two favorite toppings, though vegetarians will be happy with the tofu salad."

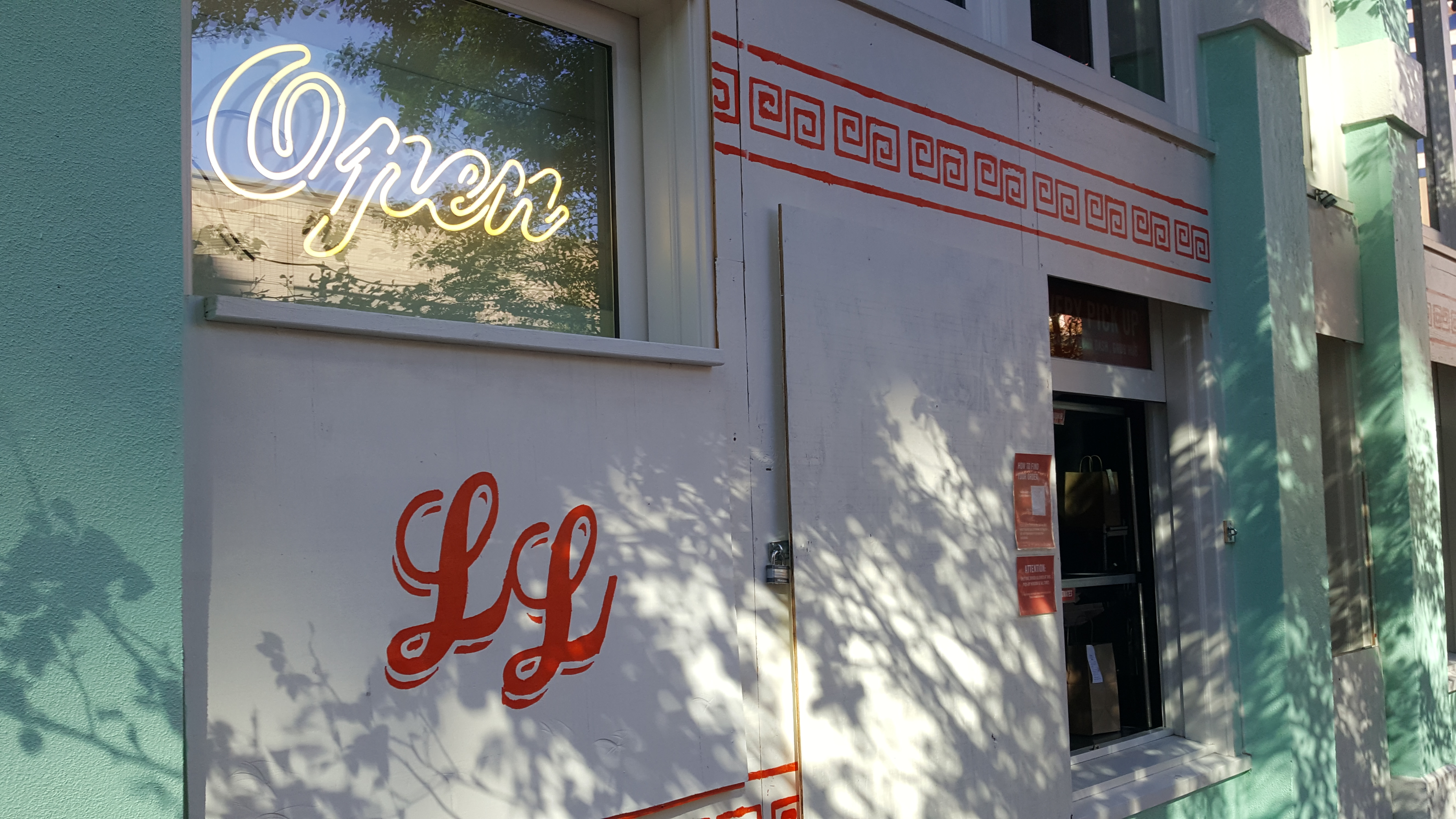
Exterior during the COVID-19 pandemic (2020)

Adam Ho was nominated in the Bartender of the Year category of Eater's annual Eater Awards in 2012. He was also nominated in the Bartender of the Year category of Eater Portland's annual Eater Awards in 2012. In 2018, the website's Nick Woo described Lúc Lắc as "hip and loud", and included the restaurant in a list of fourteen "soul-soothing" noodle soups in the city. The business was included in Eater Portland's 2022 overview of recommended restaurants in downtown Portland, 2023 list of the city's best pho, 2024 overview of the city's best Vietnamese restaurants, and 2025 list of the city's best non-alcoholic drinks. Thrillist has called the restaurant a "late-night pho oasis". The website's Mai Pham included Lúc Lắc in the website's 2018 list of the 28 best Vietnamese restaurants in the U.S. Meira Gebel included the business in Axios Portland's 2025 list of ten restaurants "worth going out of your way for when the midnight munchies hit".

In 2014, Willamette Week said Lúc Lắc "is actually a much better cocktail bar than it is a Vietnamese restaurant". The restaurant won in the "Best Pho" category in the newspaper's annual "Best of Portland" readers' poll in 2015; Lúc Lắc also received "honorable mention" in the "Best Baguette" category. The business won in the same poll's "Best Vietnamese Restaurant" and "Best Late-Night Menu" categories in 2018, 2022, 2024, and 2025. In 2019, Willamette Week included the restaurant in its list of five "places to eat cheap after hours", saying: "Luc Lac is one of the very few spots where you can stuff your drunken craw with delightful, heaping takes on Vietnamese classics in the wee hours of the morn." Singer Storm Large considered the restaurant a favorite in 2024.

== See also ==
- List of Vietnamese restaurants
