= Leon Chung Company Building =

Historic building in Portland, Oregon, U.S.

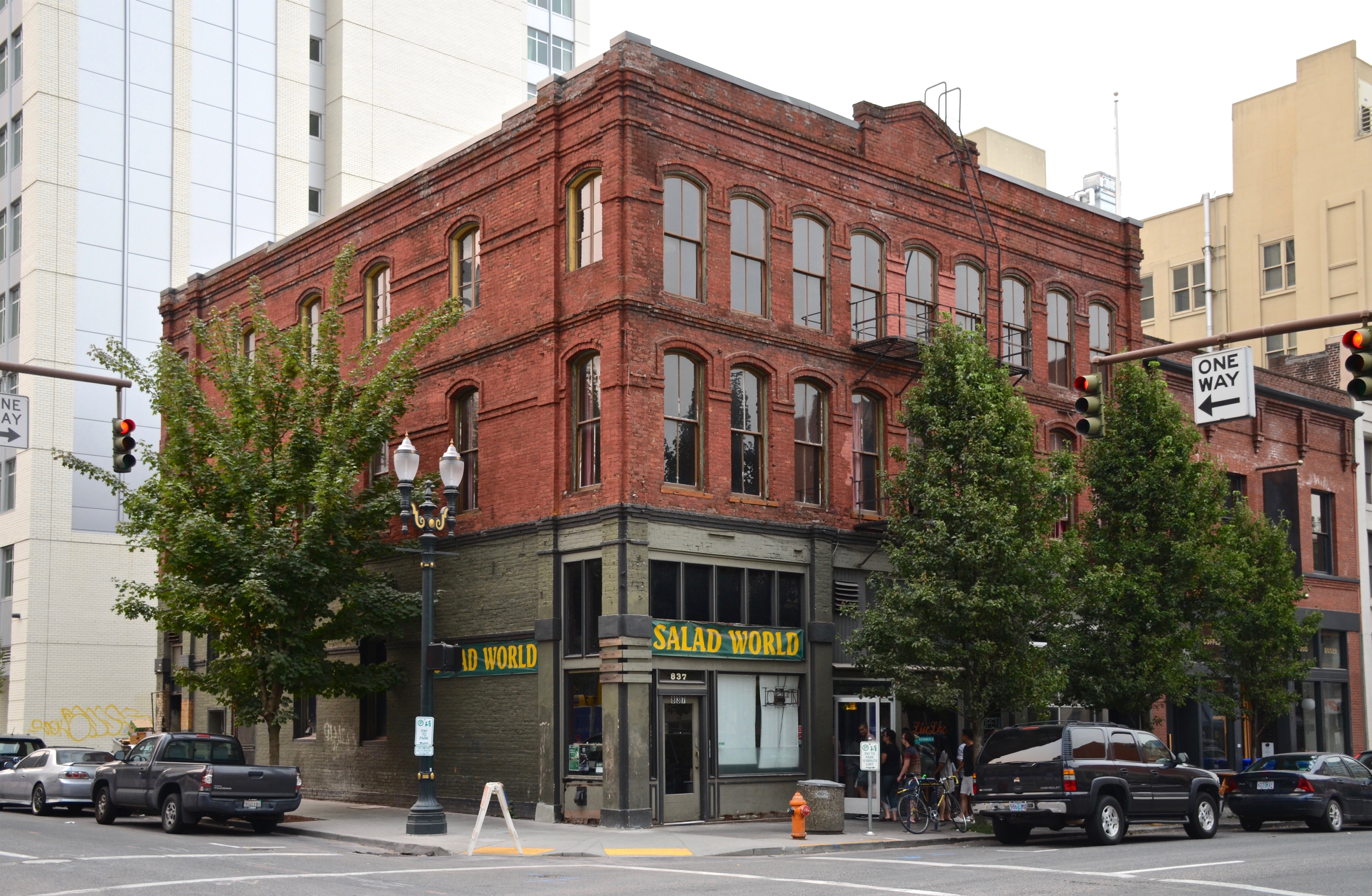
- The building's exterior in 2017
- Interactive map of the Leon Chung Company Building area

General information
- Location: Portland, Oregon, United States
- Coordinates: 45°31′0.8″N 122°40′31.6″W

The Leon Chung Company Building, also known as the Caye's Building, is an historic building in southwest Portland, Oregon's Yamhill Historic District, in the United States. The structure currently houses Lúc Lác Vietnamese Kitchen.

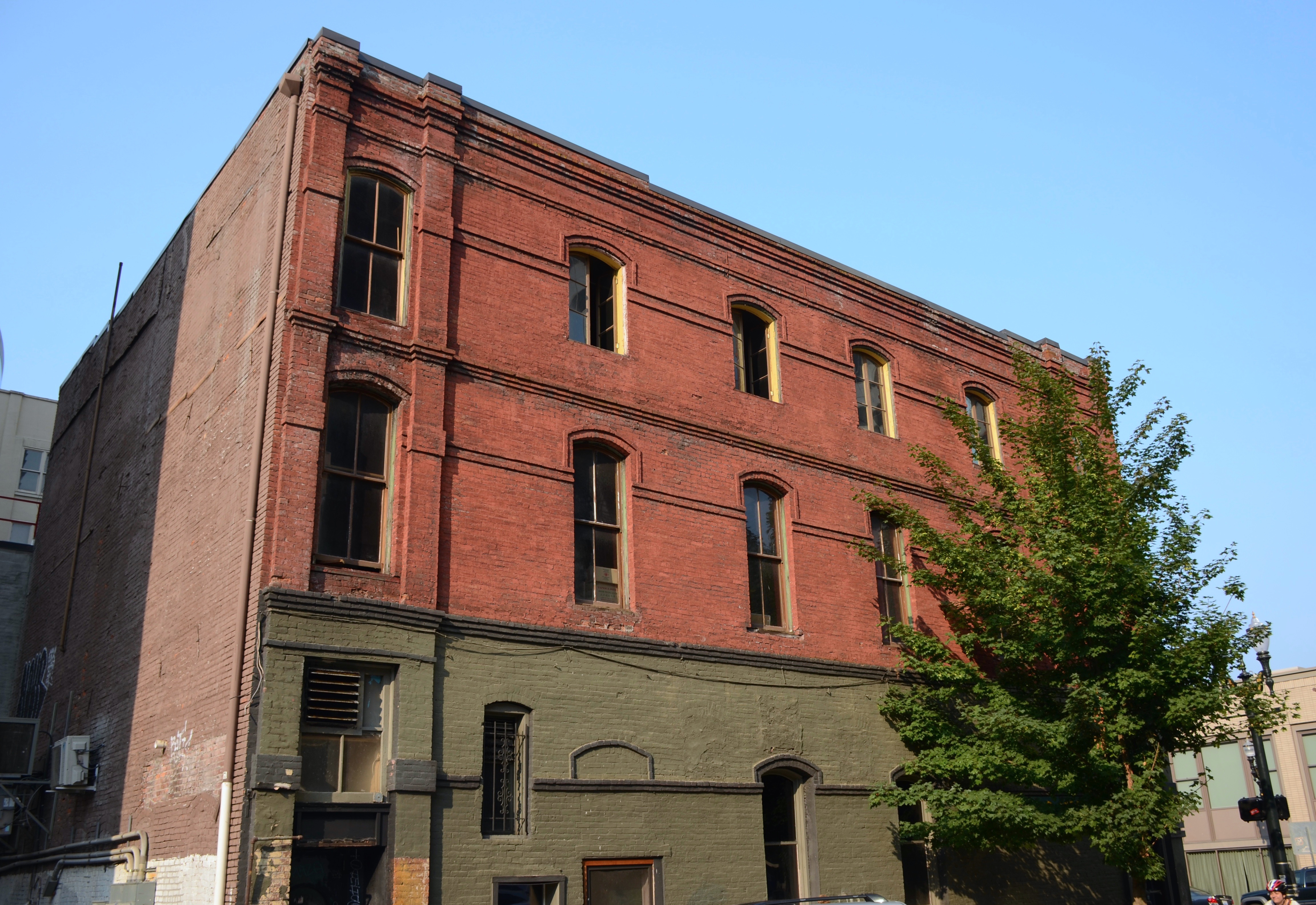
Side view, 2017
