= Great Fire of 1873 =

Large fire in Portland, Oregon, United States

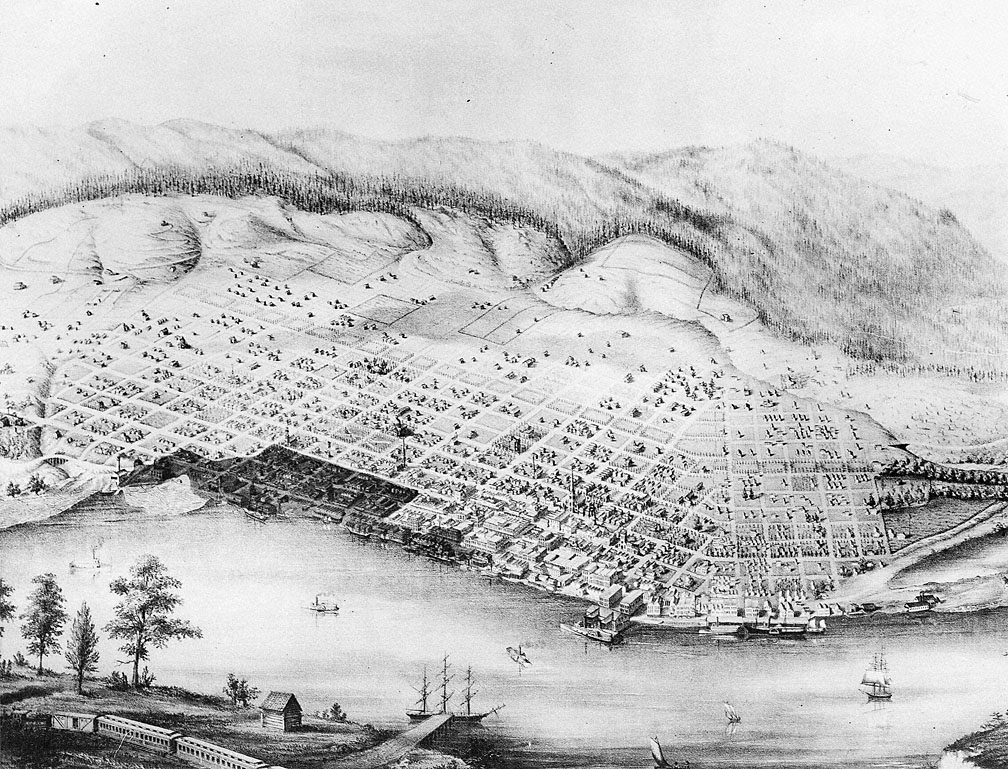
Aftermath of the Great Fire of 1873, Portland, Oregon

The Great Fire of 1873 was a major fire which swept through the downtown of Portland, Oregon on August 2, 1873, destroying twenty-two blocks on the west side of the Willamette River, including along Yamhill and Morrison Streets. A mix of mansions, tenements, and commercial property was destroyed. Many businesses were not insured, and many others were only partially insured.

== Timeline ==
At 4:20 am on the morning of August 2, 1873, a fire started on First Street near Taylor, at the Hurgren & Shindler furniture store. Fueled by the oils and varnishes in the store, the fire burned hot and spread rapidly. By 4:40 am, just twenty minutes after its start, the fire had spread a block and the nearby Metropolitan Hotel was a complete loss. The Portland volunteer fire department responded along with fire companies from Salem, Vancouver, and Oregon City. Salem's fire company came 52 miles by train within 57 minutes. When the Salem department arrived seven blocks had been consumed but they were able to stop the northern progress of the fire. The wind, however, spread the fire in all other directions and soon twelve blocks were engulfed in flames and the city water supply was failing. As the other departments arrived there were only a total of 7 engines to contend with a fire half a mile long and a quarter of a mile wide. As fast as the fire could be suppressed in one direction, it would break it in another. The fire finally stopped on its own due to lack of material to burn.

== Aftermath ==
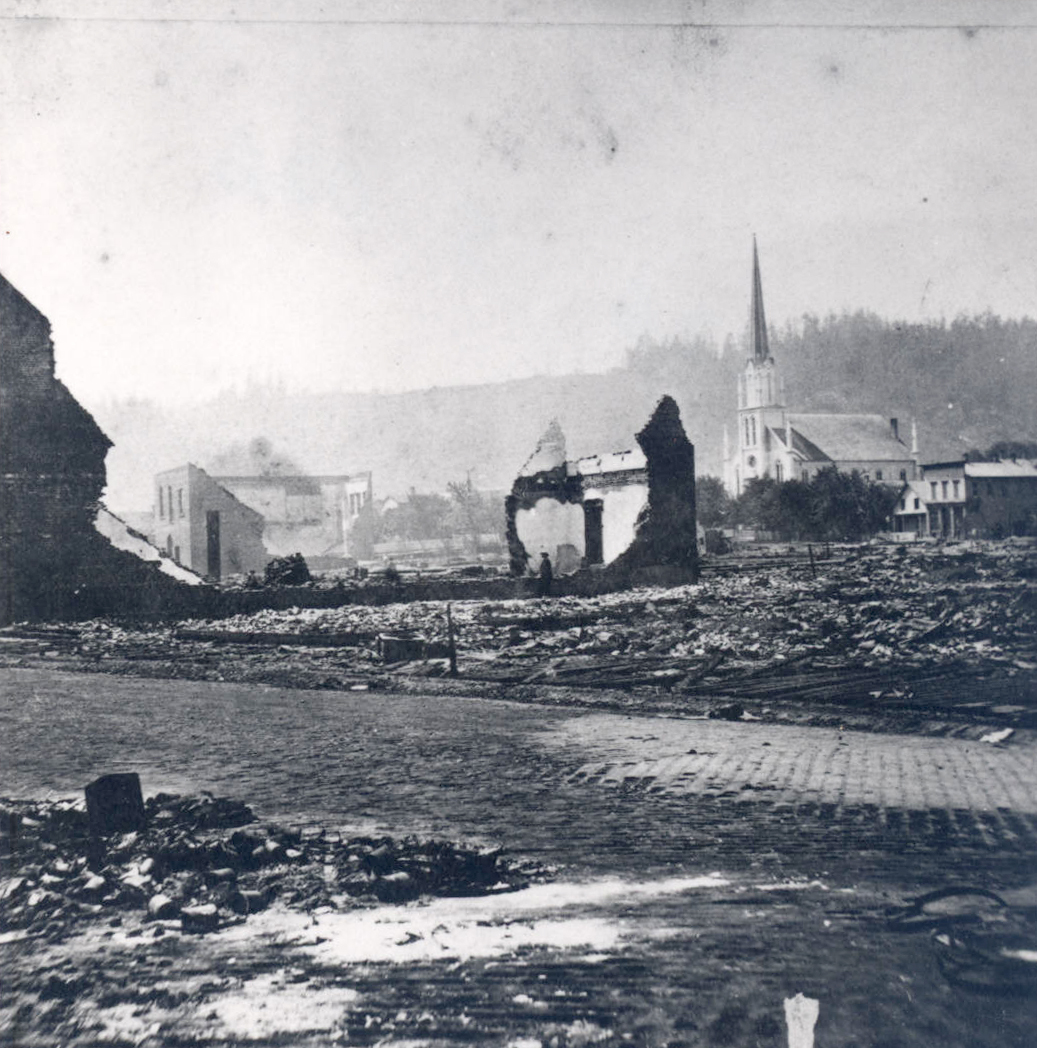
Great Fire of 1873, Portland, Oregon

Among the losses were 2 Engine Houses, 2 Sash Factories, 3 Foundries, 4 Mills, 5 Hotels, 100 retail stores, and 250 dwellings. 150 families were homeless and encamped on the city park. One estimate for the economic impact of the fire is that the fire caused $1.3 million in damage. Mayor Henry Failing chaired a relief committee and put in $10,000 himself.

The city "shunned" financial aid offered from San Francisco and the East Coast, and instead used local resources. Rebuilding was delayed by the Panic of 1873, then was in "full swing" by 1878.

The downtown area shifted to the west after the fire. The present-day Portland Yamhill Historic District, listed on the National Register of Historic Places in 1975, includes the northern part of the 22-block area. One surviving building is the Northrup and Blossom-Fitch Building (1858) from before the fire. The district includes 17 Italianate-style buildings built between 1878 and 1887.

== Controversy ==
In December 1872, 8 months prior, there had been another fire which started in a Chinese laundry facility on the waterfront along Front Street. This fire destroyed several blocks in the areas of Front and Morrison streets. The official cause of the 1873 fire is undetermined, however many people of the time believed it was started by anti-Chinese arsonists. The areas of the 1872 fire had yet to be rebuilt and acted as a buffer for the fire of 1873.
