= New Year in the Park =

Annual event in Portland, Oregon, U.S.

- Logo
- Status: Active
- Begins: 2015
- Frequency: Annually
- Venue: Glenhaven Park
- Location: Portland, Oregon
- Country: United States
- Website: newyearinthepark.com

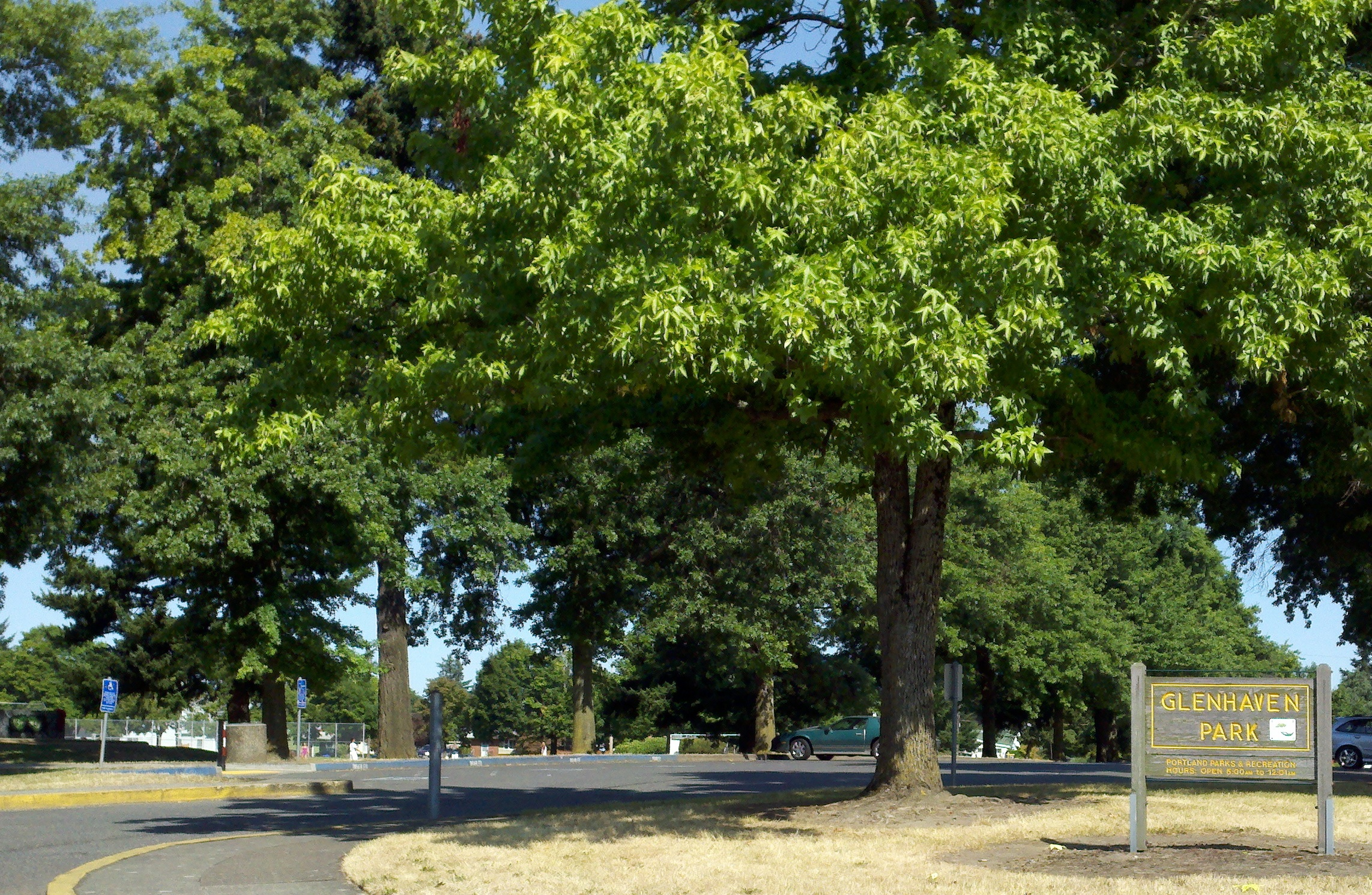
The event is held at Glenhaven Park (pictured in 2011).

New Year in the Park is an annual event in Portland, Oregon, United States. The multicultural event is held at Glenhaven Park, in northeast Portland's Madison South neighborhood, and celebrates several Asian (particularly Burmese, Cambodian, Lao, and Thai) communities. It features crafts, dancing, games, music, and vendors. Hundreds of people attended the fifth event in 2019.

Saron Khut is the founder. The event was first held in 2015. The 2023 event saw a record attendance.

== See also ==
- Culture of Portland, Oregon
- Ethnic groups in Portland, Oregon
- List of festivals in the United States
- Lunar New Year in Portland, Oregon
