= Willamette Block =

Historic building in Portland, Oregon, U.S.

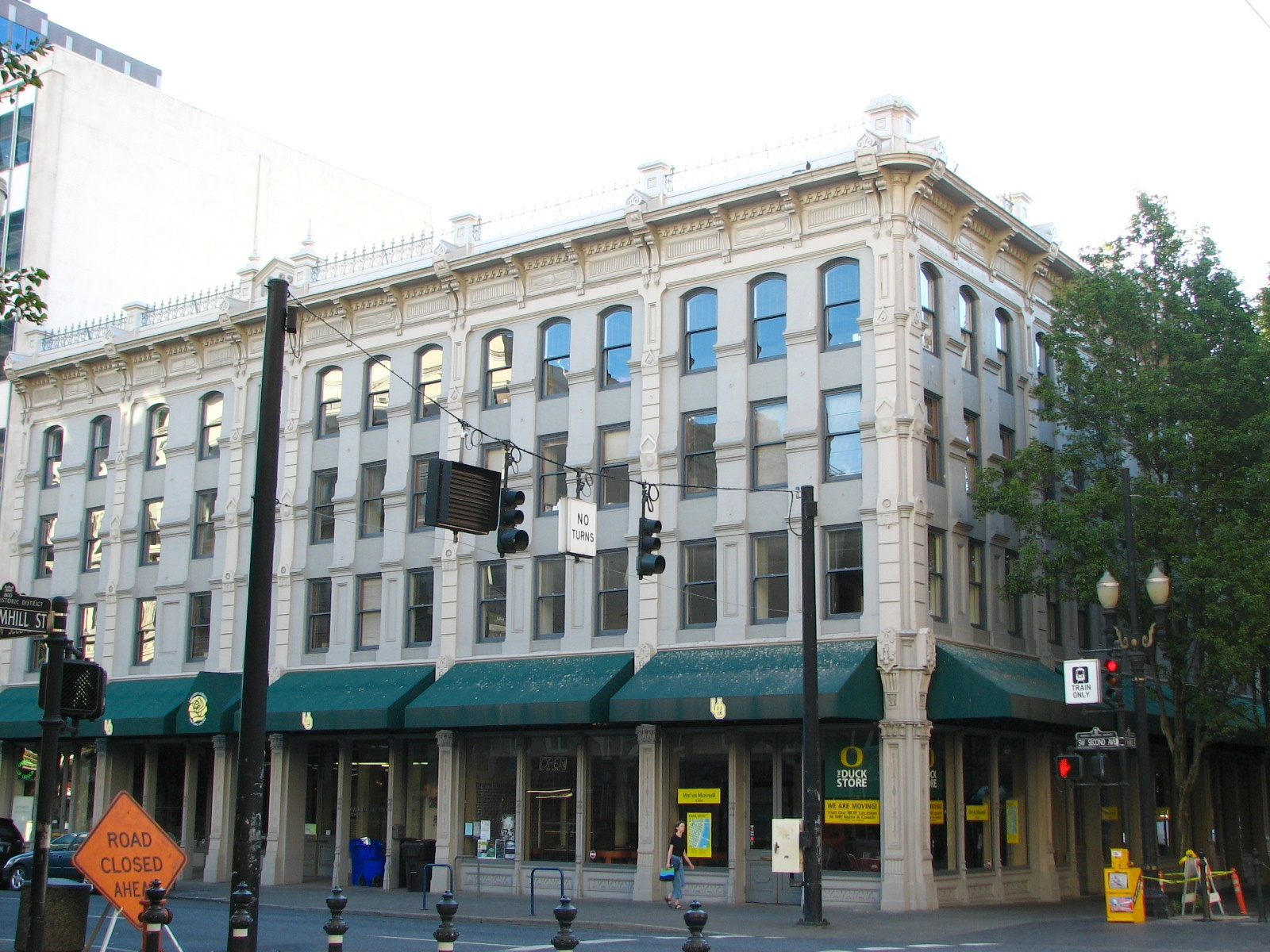
- The building's exterior in 2008
- Interactive map of the Willamette Block area

General information
- Location: Portland, Oregon, United States
- Coordinates: 45°31′3″N 122°40′28″W

Willamette Block is an historic building in Portland, Oregon. The 1882 structures is part of the Portland Yamhill Historic District, which is listed on the National Register of Historic Places.
