= Delicious Donuts =

Doughnut shop in Portland, Oregon, U.S.

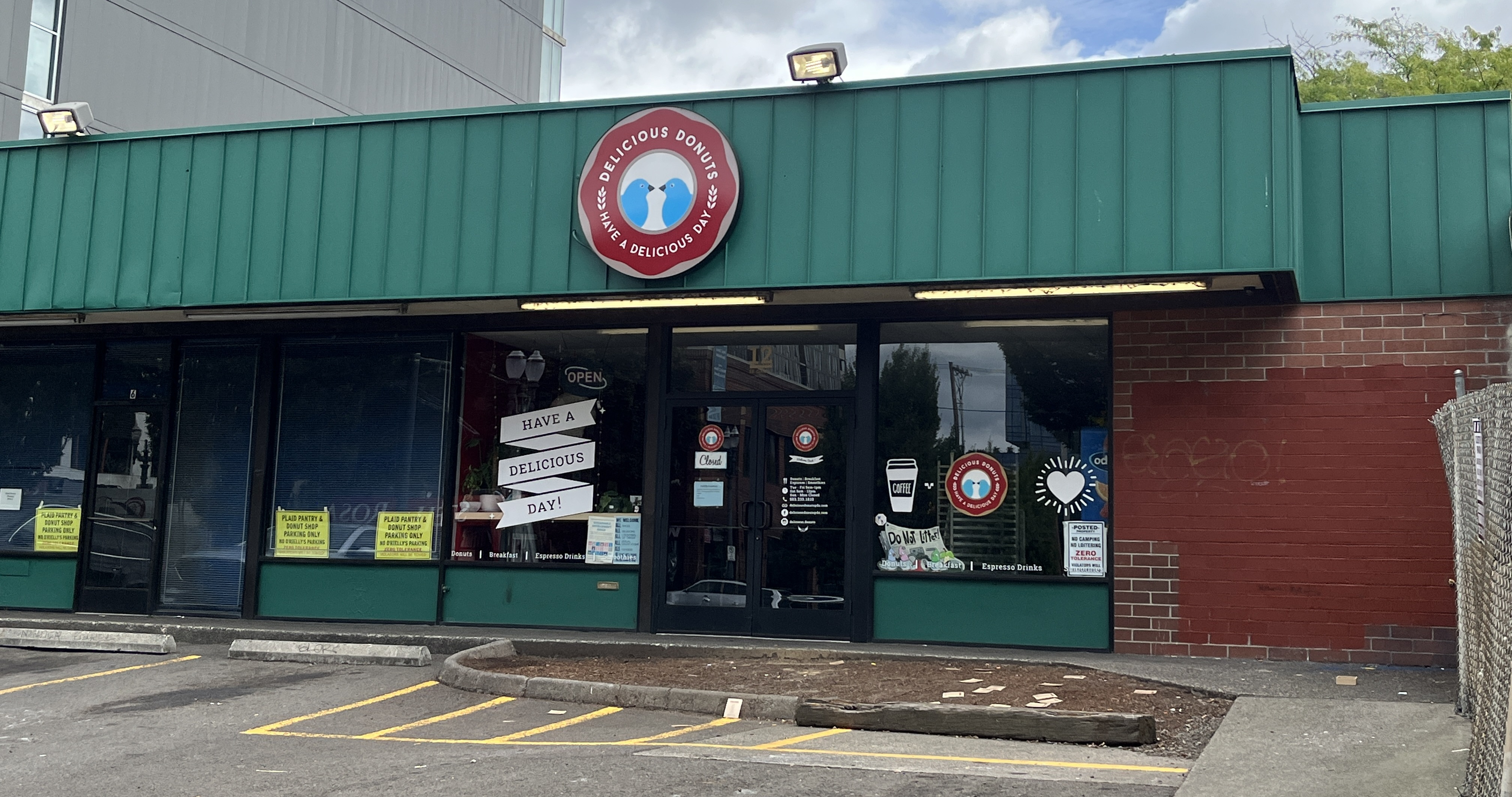
- The shop's exterior in 2022
- Interactive map of Delicious Donuts

Restaurant information
- Established: 2005
- Owners: Boun Saribout; Penny Nguyen
- Location: 12 Southeast Grand Avenue, Portland, Multnomah, Oregon, 97214, United States
- Coordinates: 45.5225°N 122.6603°W
- Website: deliciousdonutspdx.com

Delicious Donuts is a doughnut shop in Portland, Oregon. Operating in southeast Portland's Buckman neighborhood, just south of Burnside Street, the business is owned by spouses Boun Saribout and Penny Nguyen. In addition to doughnuts, the menu includes breakfast burritos, cakes, cakes, cinnamon rolls, sandwiches, smoothies, and espresso drinks.

Established in 2005, Delicious Donuts has garnered a positive reception. The business ranked first in The Oregonian's 2018 overview of Portland's best doughnut shops, and was selected to represent Oregon in Food & Wine's 2021 list of the best doughnuts in each U.S. state.

== Description ==
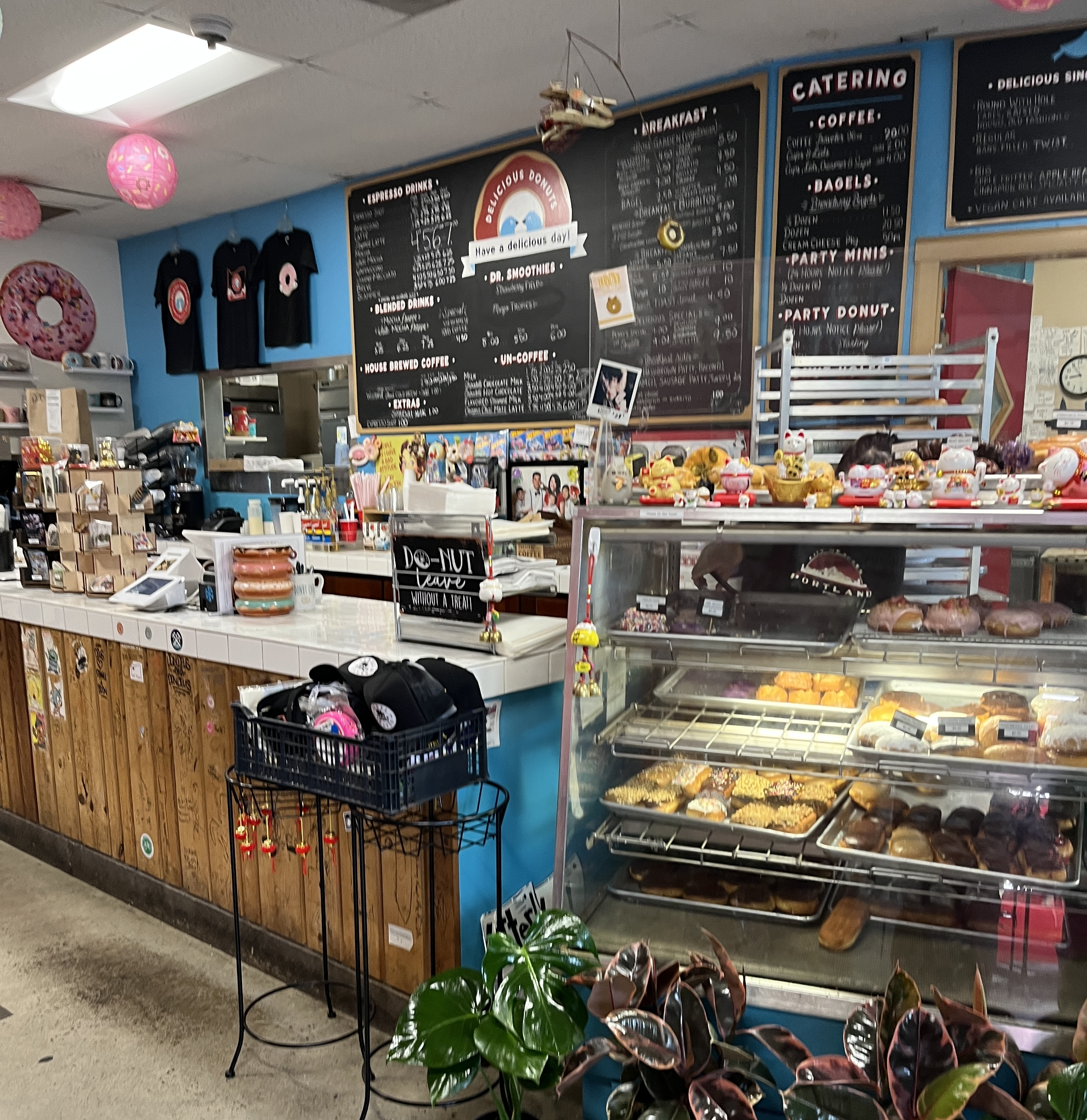
The shop's interior, 2025

Delicious Donuts operates on Grand Avenue at the intersection of Burnside Street in southeast Portland's Buckman neighborhood. According to Eater Portland, the shop has a "cheerfully" blue interior and serves doughnuts with ingredients like peanut butter and jelly, as well as maple bars and a breakfast sandwich made from a glazed doughnut.

In addition to other pastries like bear claws, crullers, and cinnamon rolls, the shop serves breakfast burritos, cakes, smoothies, and espresso drinks. The Aiden's Sandwich has eggs American cheese, and a choice of bread (or doughnut) and meat.

== History ==
The business is owned by married couple Boun Saribout and Penny Nguyen, who opened the shop in 2005. Delicious Donuts made approximately 1,000 doughnuts per day in 2009. In 2023, the business partnered with Vietnamese restaurant Matta to offer a doughnut box for Lunar New Year. Delicious Donuts partnered with artist Mike Bennett to offer a box to commemorate the Year of the Dragon in 2024 and 2025.

== Reception ==
In 2016, Matthew Korfhage of Willamette Week wrote, "If they're warm, the cake doughnuts here destroy all others in the city." Michael Russell ranked Delicious Donuts first in The Oregonian's 2018 overview of Portland's best doughnut shops. Ann Smith and Allison Symonds included the business in an overview of the city's best doughnuts in the book 100 Things to Do in Portland, Oregon Before You Die. Time Out Portland included Delicious Donuts in a 2019 list of the city's twelve best doughnuts. David Landsel selected Delicious Donuts for Oregon in Food & Wine's 2021 list of the best doughnuts in each U.S. state. He wrote:

Their cinnamon roll doughnuts, crunchy fritters, and apple-filled bear claws are famously good, the blueberry cake is like some gorgeous, deep-fried muffin, but don't get too comfortable, because unless you time it right, you'll typically take what you can get. Good news, however — you'll be totally fine with this because it's all good.

The shop was included in Eater Portland's 2021 list of seventeen restaurants for "amazing" breakfast sandwiches, 2023 list of recommended eateries near the Moda Center and Oregon Convention Center, and 2024 list of the city's "most delicious" doughnuts. The Travel Channel has also included the business in an overview of five "delicious" doughnut shops in Portland.

== See also ==
- List of doughnut shops
