= Hale Pele =

Tiki bar in Portland, Oregon, U.S.

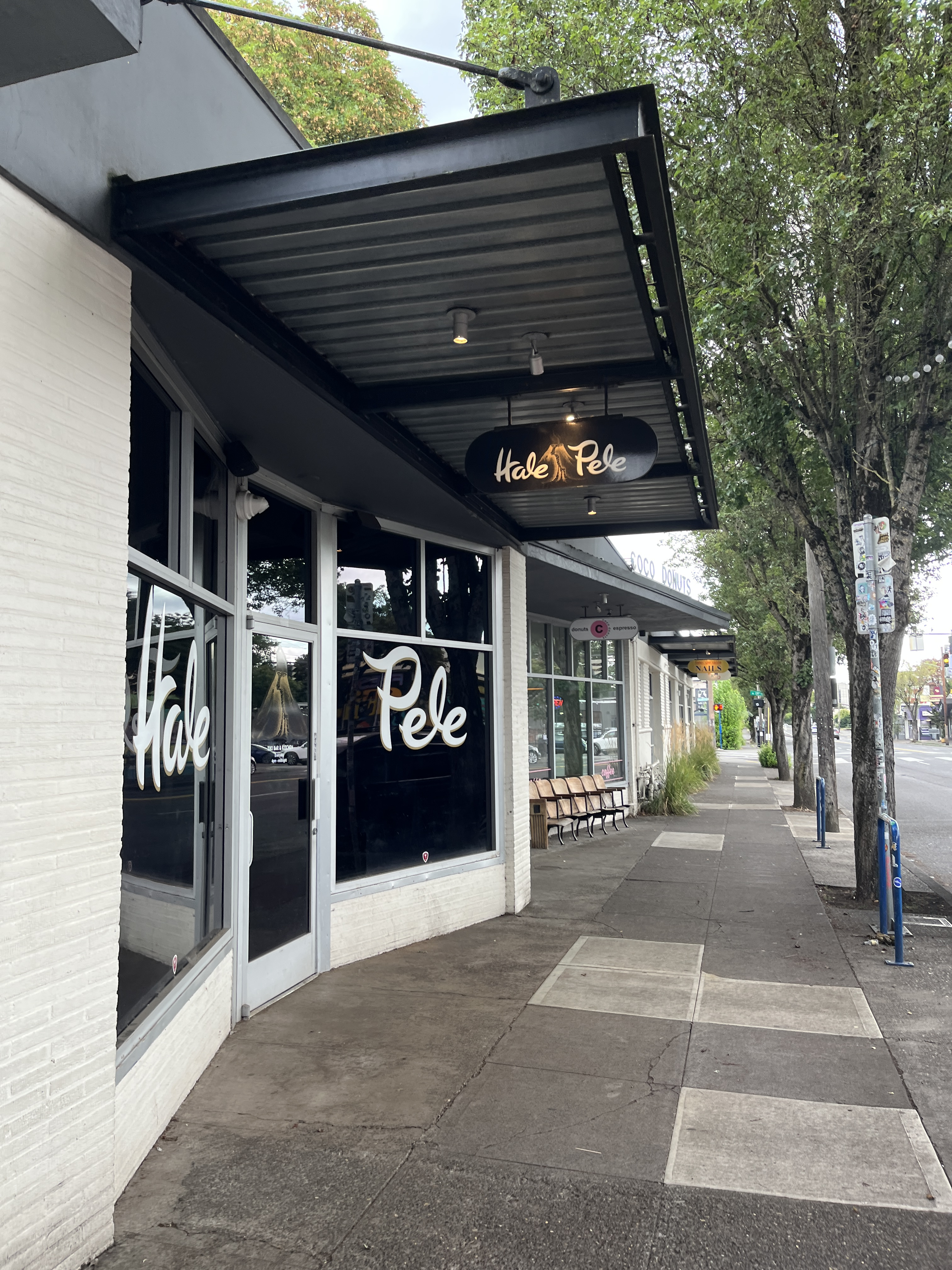
- The bar's exterior in 2025
- Interactive map of Hale Pele

Restaurant information
- Owners: Martin Cate; Blair Reynolds
- Location: 2733 Northeast Broadway, Portland, Multnomah, Oregon, 97232, United States
- Coordinates: 45.5353°N 122.6374°W
- Website: halepele.com

Hale Pele is a tiki bar and restaurant in Portland, Oregon, United States. It has garnered a positive reception. It is owned by Martin Cate and Blair Reynolds.

== Description ==
The tiki bar Hale Pele operates in northeast Portland's Grant Park neighborhood. In addition to cocktails, the bar serves non-alcoholic drinks. Food options include small plates such as Hawaiian bread, poke, and weebimbap.

== Reception ==
Alex Frane included the business in Portland Monthly's 2025 list of the city's best bars.
