= Portland Yamhill Historic District =

Historic district in Portland, Oregon, U.S.

- U.S. National Register of Historic Places
- U.S. Historic district
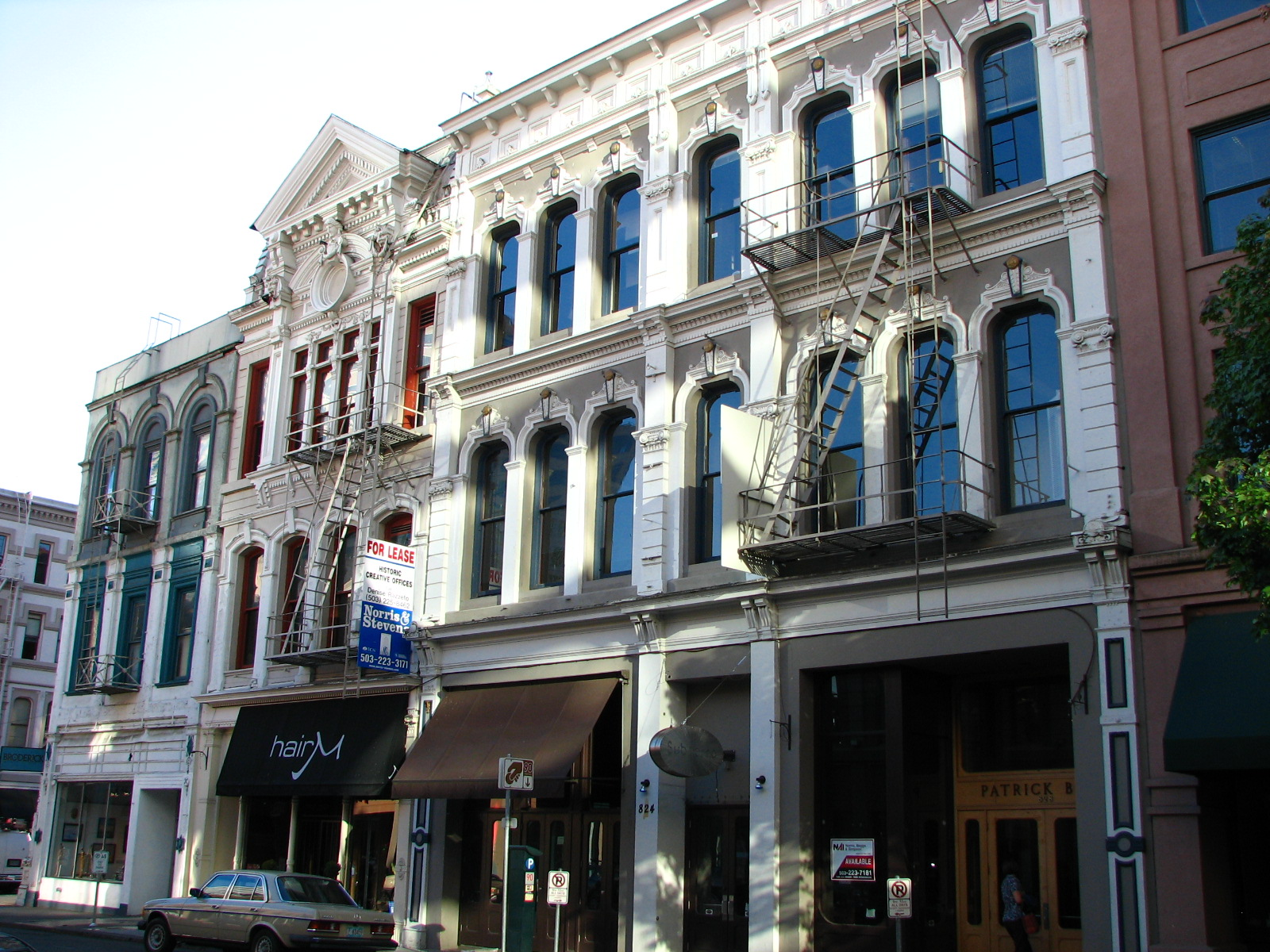

- Location within Portland, Oregon Location within Oregon Location within the United States

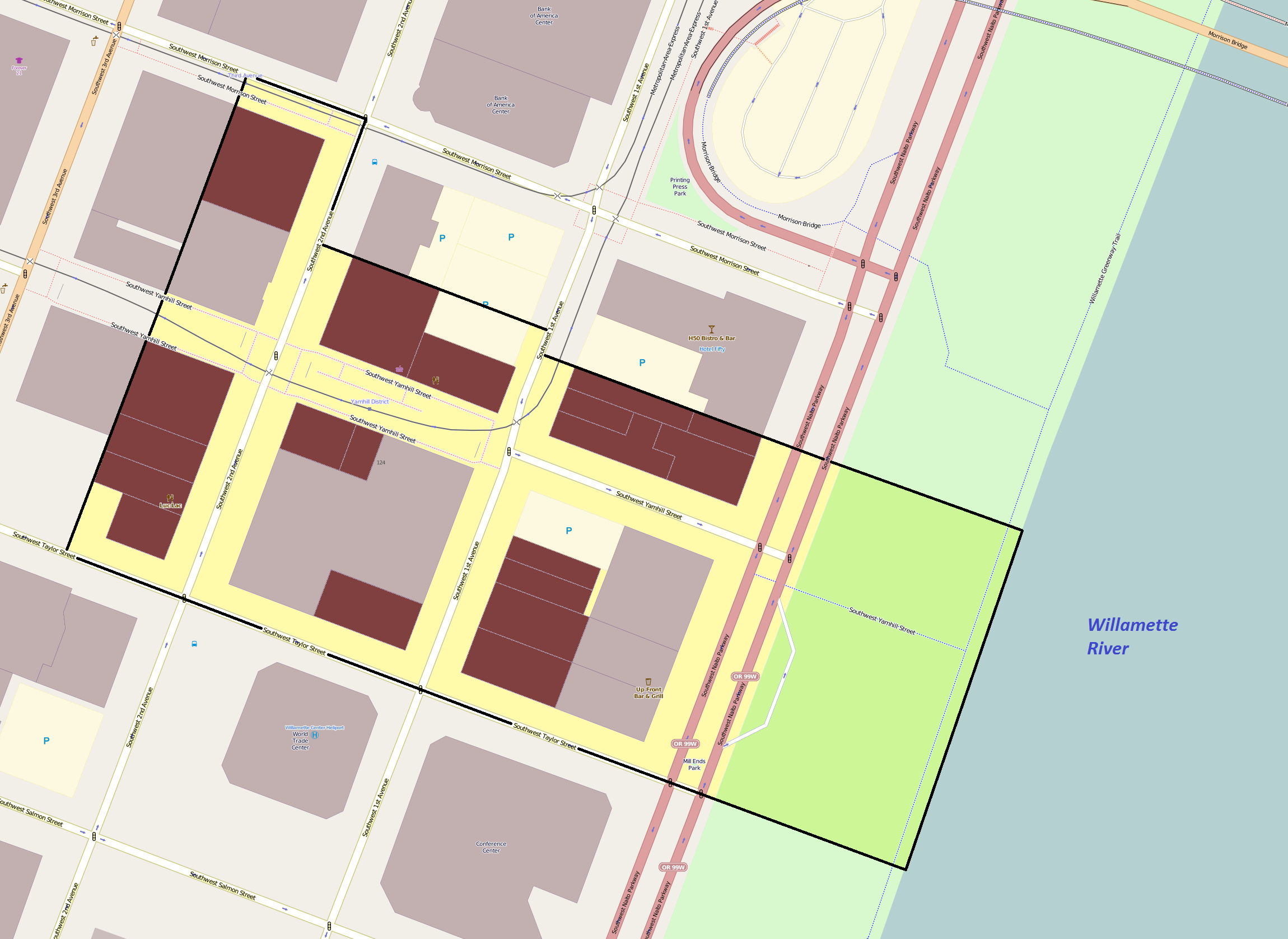
- Location: Portland, Oregon, roughly bounded by SW Taylor and Morrison Streets, both sides of SW 2nd Avenue, and the Willamette River
- Coordinates: 45°31′01″N 122°40′26″W
- Area: 11.5 acres (4.7 ha)
- Architectural style: Italianate
- NRHP reference No.: 76001587
- Added to NRHP: July 30, 1976

The Portland Yamhill Historic District, located in downtown Portland, Oregon, is listed on the National Register of Historic Places.

From 1914 to 1934, the area included part of the Carroll Public Market.

The area covered, between the commercial center of Portland and the Willamette River, is within a 22-block section destroyed in the Great Fire of 1873; it includes the Northrup and Blossom-Fitch Building (1858) from before the fire. Rebuilding after the fire got into "full swing" in 1878; the district includes 17 Italianate-style buildings built between 1878 and 1887.

Selected buildings in the district include:

- Leon Chung Company Building
- Rensselaer Block, built by W.S. Ham
- Strowbridge Building, an Italianate masonry building
- Mikado Block
- Moy Building (1910). the six-story Chicago School-style, also known as the Bellevue Hotel.
- H.W. Corbett Building, 124 SW Yamhill
- Willamette Block

== See also ==
- National Register of Historic Places listings in Southwest Portland, Oregon
